= Suzuki Swift =

Supermini car produced by Suzuki

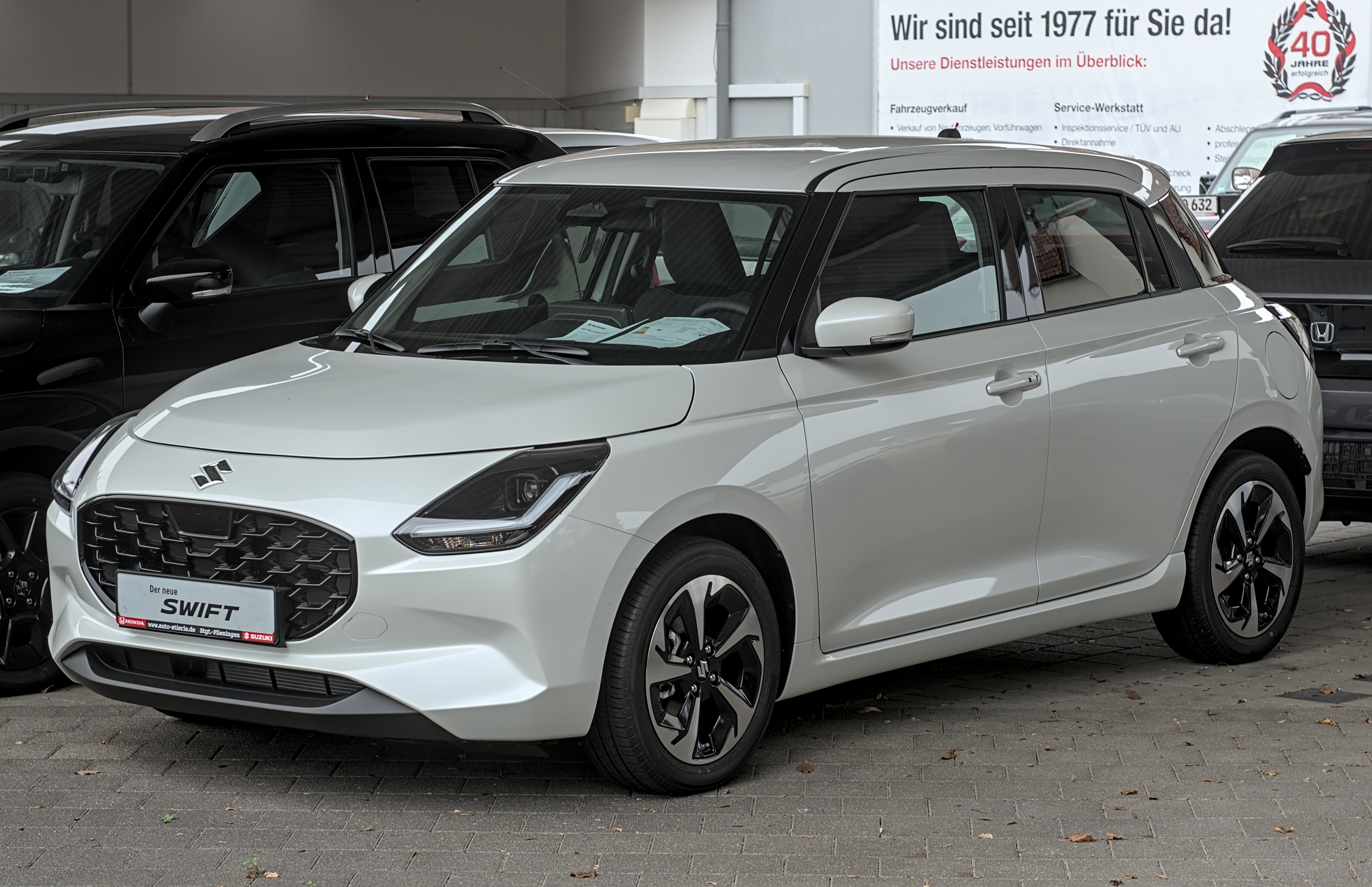
- Fourth generation Suzuki Swift

Overview
- Manufacturer: Suzuki
- Production: September 2004 – present Nameplate first used in 1984

Body and chassis
- Class: Supermini (B); Subcompact; Hot hatch/warm hatch (Swift Sport)
- Body style: 3-door hatchback (2004–2017); 5-door hatchback (2004–present)
- Layout: Front-engine, front-wheel-drive; Four-wheel-drive

Chronology
- Predecessor: Suzuki Cultus/Swift hatchback; Suzuki Baleno hatchback (integrated)

The Suzuki Swift (Japanese: スズキ・スイフト, Hepburn: Suzuki Suifuto) is a supermini car (B-segment) produced by Suzuki. The vehicle is classified as a B-segment marque in the European single market, a segment referred to as a supermini in the British Isles. Prior to this, the "Swift" nameplate had been applied to the rebadged Suzuki Cultus in numerous export markets since 1984. The Swift became its own model in 2004. Currently, the Swift is positioned between Ignis and Baleno in Suzuki's global hatchback lineup.

Since its introduction as a global model in 2004, the Swift has sold 10 million units as of September 2025.

== Predecessors ==
=== International (1983–2003) ===
The Suzuki Swift nameplate began in 1984 as an export name for the Suzuki Cultus, a supermini/subcompact car manufactured and marketed worldwide since 1983 across two generations and three body configurations—three/five-door hatchback, four-door sedan and two-door convertible—and using the Suzuki G engine family.

The Swift was marketed in the Japanese domestic market (JDM) as the Cultus and elsewhere as the Suzuki SA310, Suzuki Swift, Suzuki Forsa, Chevrolet Swift, Chevrolet Sprint/Sprint Metro, Geo Metro, Pontiac Firefly, Maruti 1000, Holden Barina and Subaru Justy. The Swift-badged Cultus ended its production in Hungary in 2003.

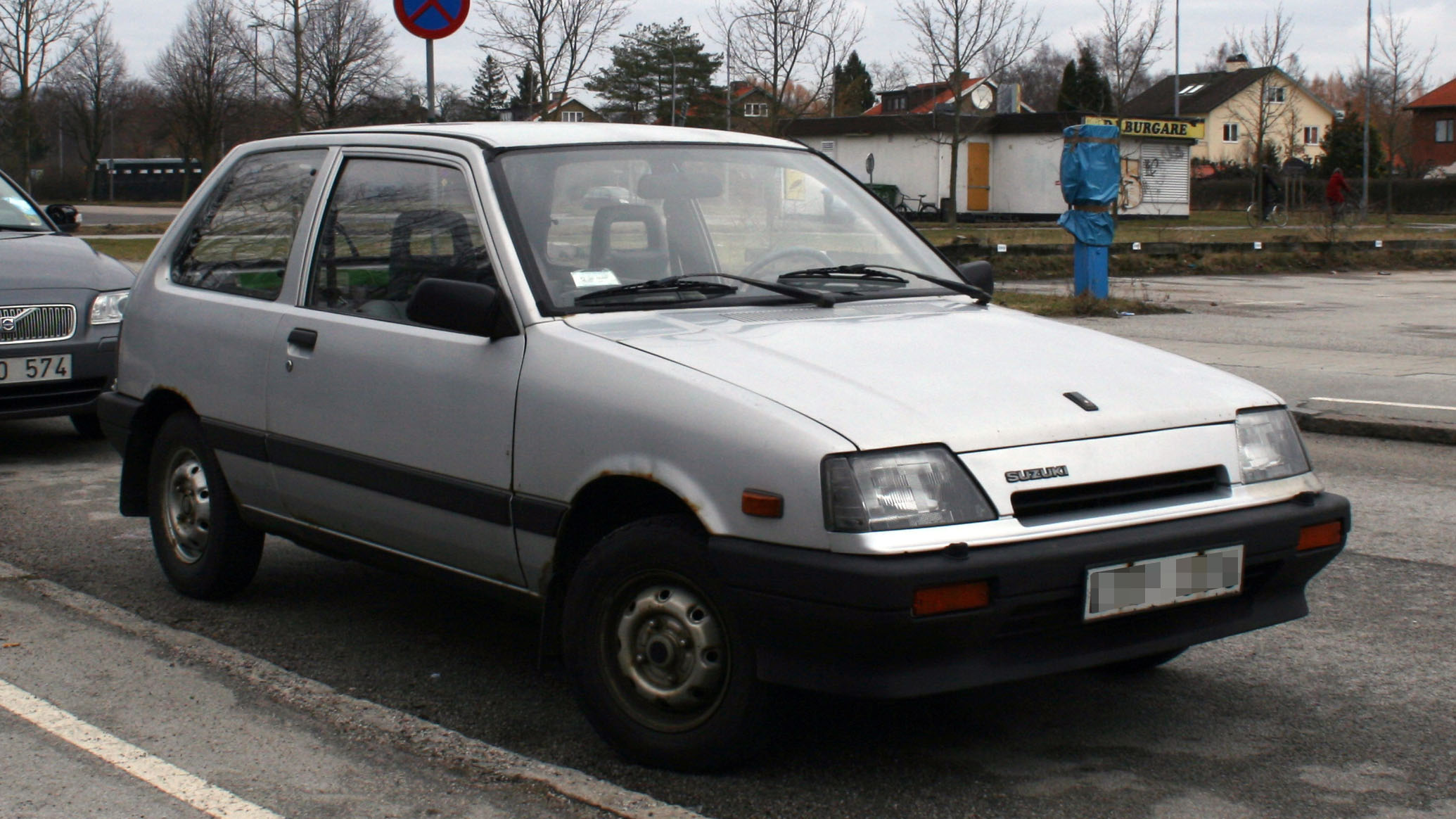
First generation (1984–1988)

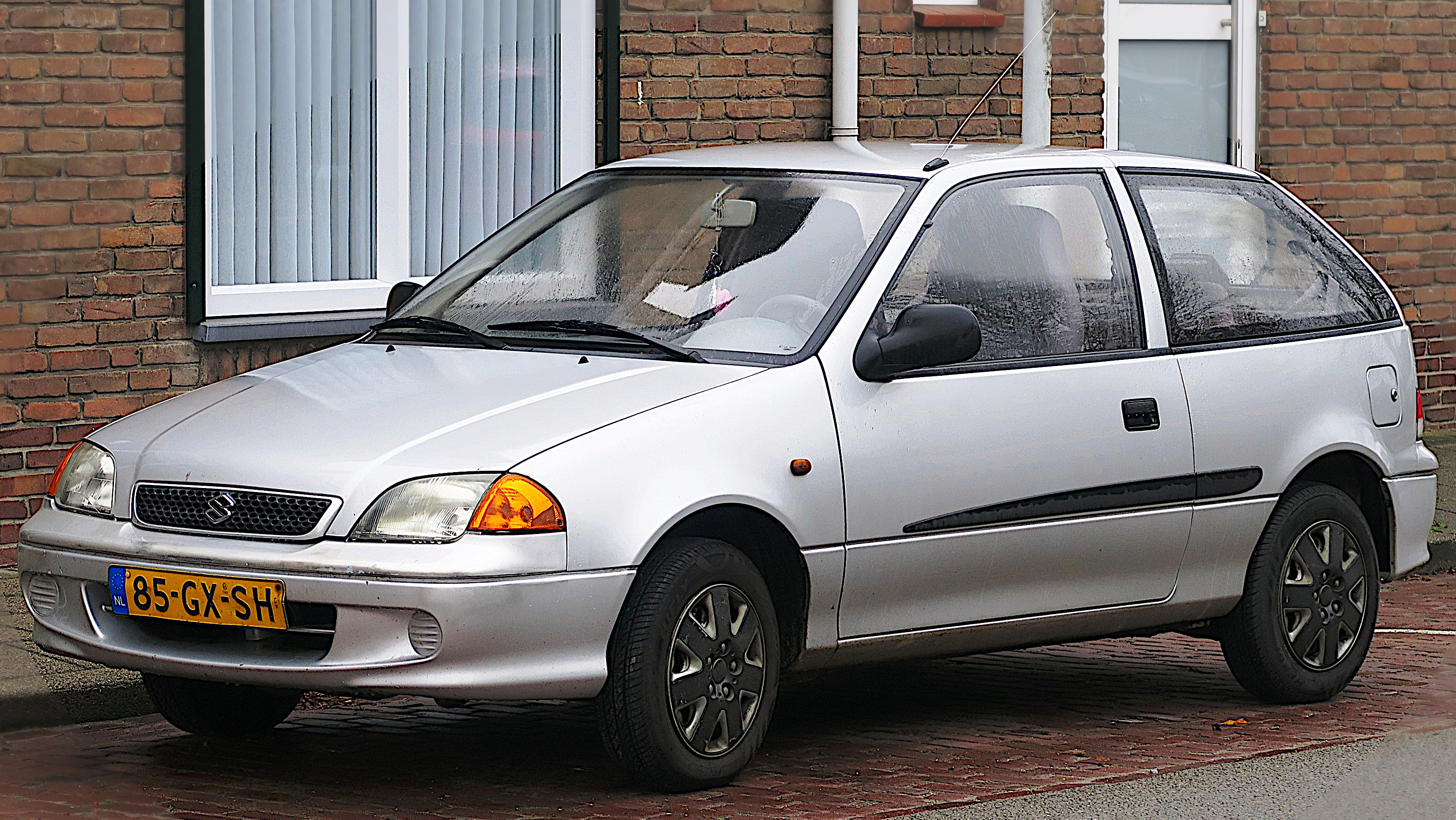
Second generation (1988–2003)

=== Japan (2000–2006) ===
In Japan, the Swift nameplate was introduced in 2000 as a replacement for the Suzuki Cultus. Outside Japan, the "Suzuki Ignis" name was used. Both three- and five-door hatchback body styles were offered, although the three-door was not offered as part of the regular lineup in Japan.

The Swift was powered by a new generation of Suzuki inline-four gasoline engines, the M family. Engine displacements of 1.3- and 1.5-liters were offered, both with a five-speed manual transmission or optional four-speed automatic. The vehicle was available with either front- or four-wheel drive. Vehicles fitted with the 1.3-liter engine were designated HT51S, with the 1.5-liter version assigned HT81S.

The three-door body variant formed the basis of the Swift Sport in Japan, or Ignis Sport in export markets. Introduced in 2003, it featured redesigned bumpers and was fitted with a higher-output version of the 1.5-liter engine, producing 85 kW; 113 hp (115 PS). The Sport ceased production in 2005, with the regular Swift (1.3-liter SE-Z trim) remaining until 2006 and sold side by side with the first generation global version Swift since November 2004.

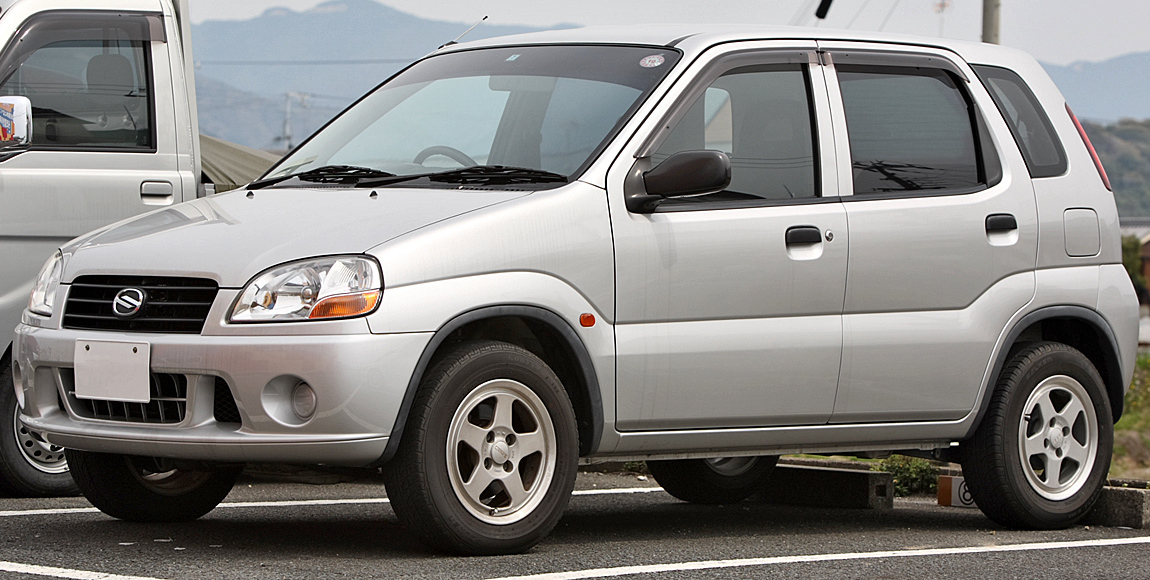
2000–2003 Suzuki Swift

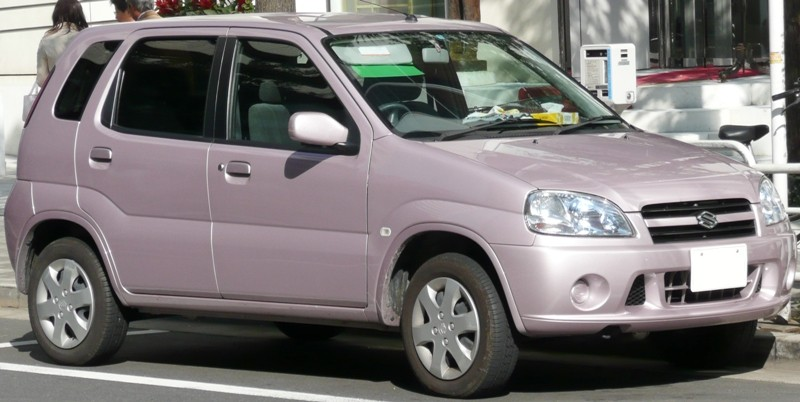
2003-2006 Suzuki Swift

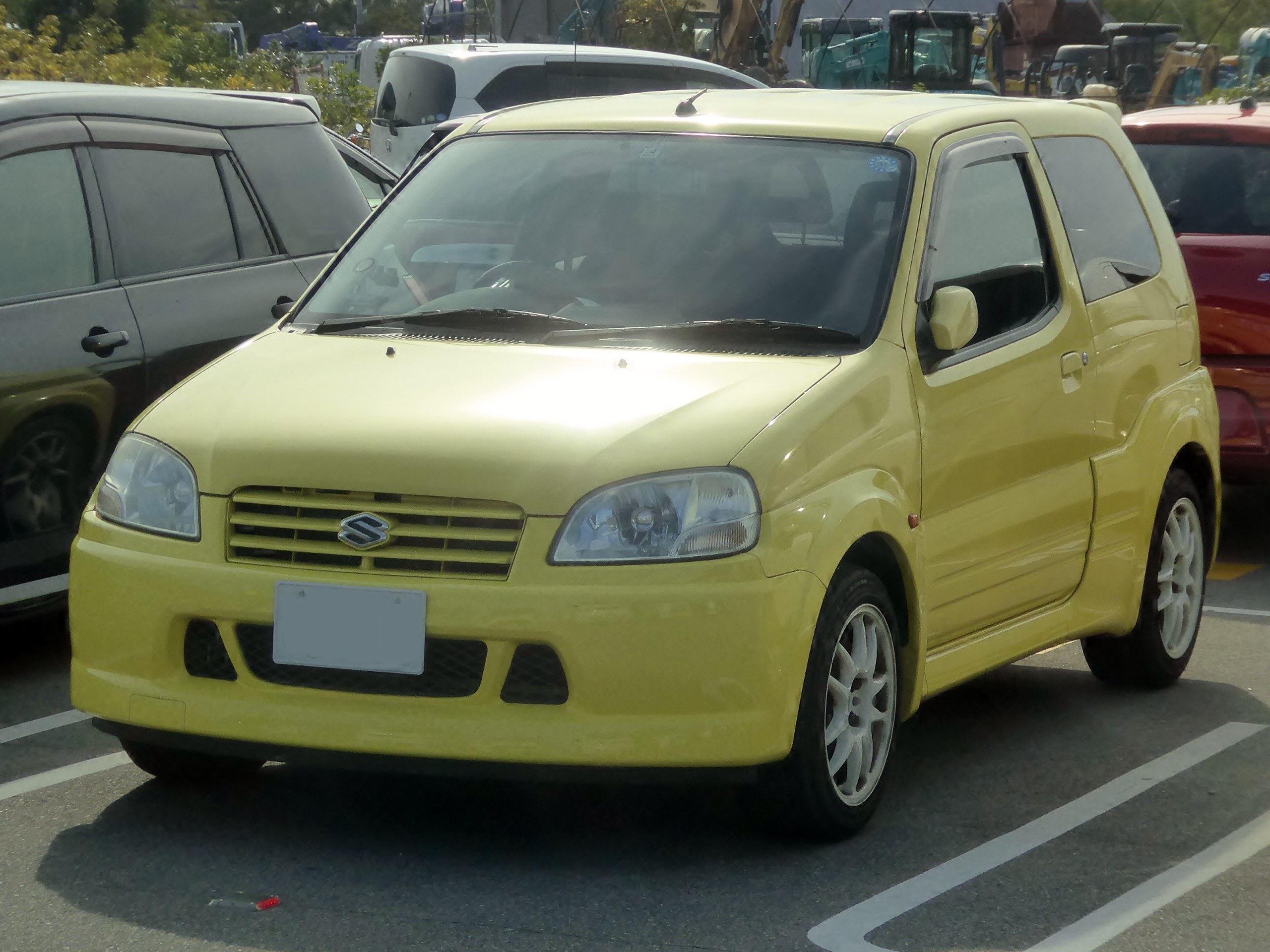
Suzuki Swift Sport

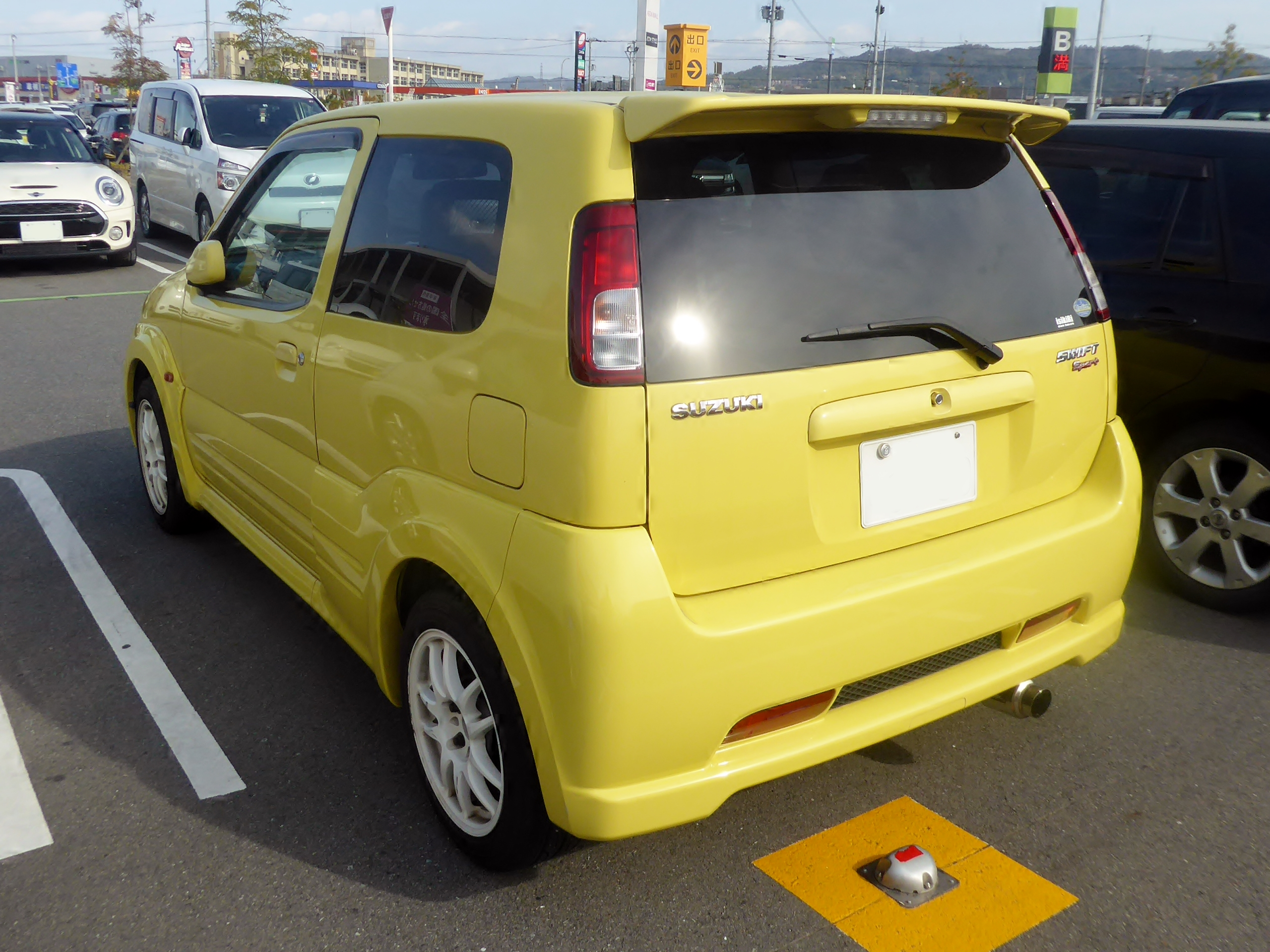
Suzuki Swift Sport (rear)

== First generation (RS; 2004) ==
First generation
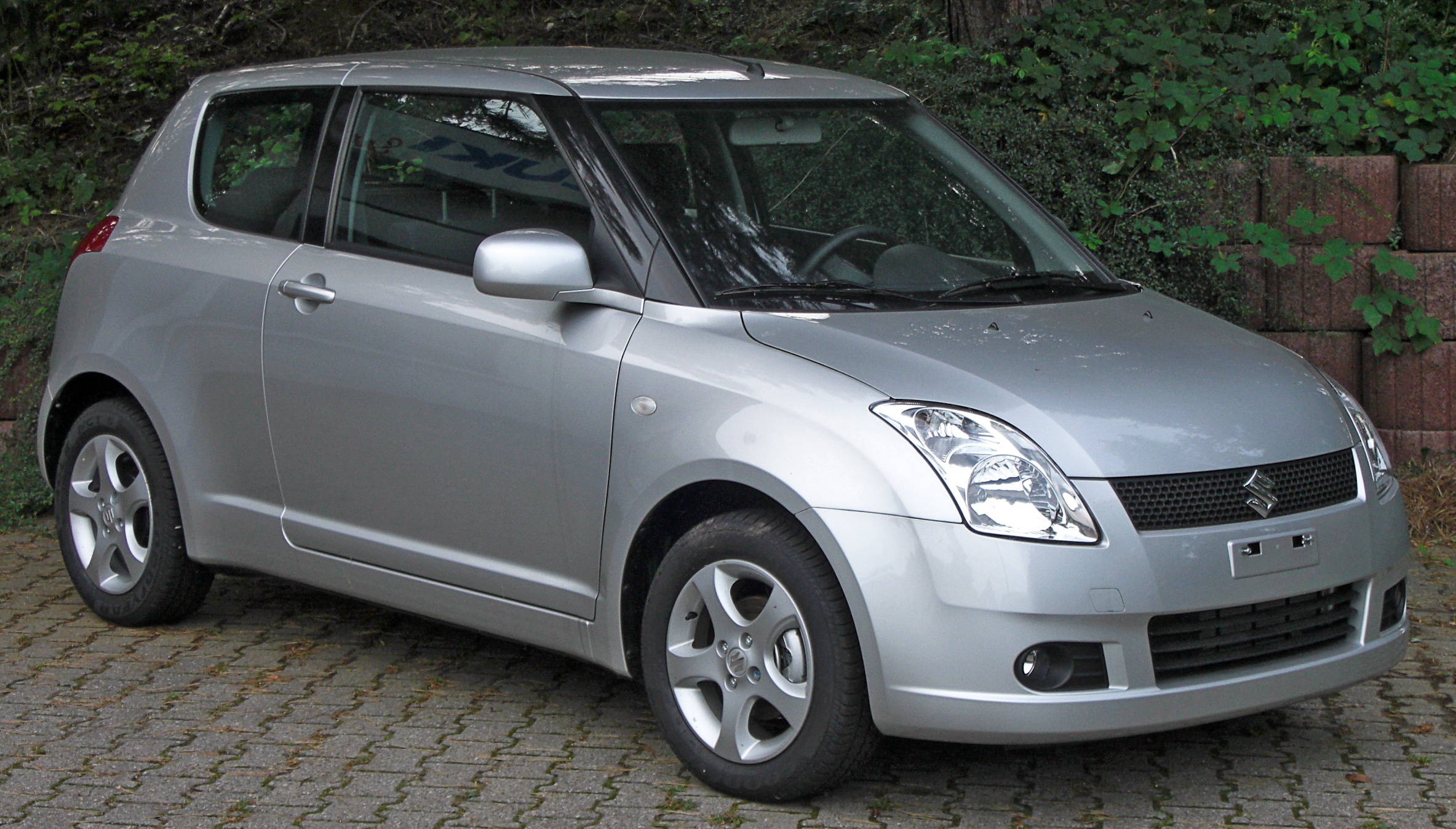
- 3-door hatchback (pre-facelift; Germany)

Overview
- Model code: RS
- Production: September 2004 – 2010 (Japan); February 2005 – 2010 (Hungary); May 2005 – August 2011 (India); November 2005–2011 (Indonesia); June 2005 – September 2018 (China); September 2005 – 2009 (Taiwan); May 2007 – 2010 (Malaysia); November 2009 – August 2021 (Pakistan)
- Assembly: Japan: Kosai (Kosai Plant); China: Chongqing (Changan Suzuki); Egypt: Cairo (AAV); Hungary: Esztergom (Magyar Suzuki); India: Manesar (Maruti Suzuki); Indonesia: Bekasi (Suzuki Indomobil Motor); Malaysia: Pekan (DRB-HICOM); Pakistan: Karachi (Pak Suzuki); Taiwan: New Taipei City (Prince Motors)
- Designer: Yasukazu Yuki and Hirohito Matsumoto

Body and chassis
- Related: Suzuki Swift Dzire; Suzuki Splash; Opel/Vauxhall Agila

Powertrain
- Engine: Gasoline: 1.2 L K12M I4 (India); 1.25 L K12B I4 (ZC71S); 1.3 L G13BB I4 (China/India); 1.3 L M13A I4 (ZC/ZD11S); 1.5 L M15A I4 (ZC/ZD21S); 1.6 L M16A I4 (ZC31S); Diesel: 1.3 L D13A DDiS TD I4
- Transmission: 5-speed Aisin manual; 4-speed Aisin automatic; Jatco CVT

Dimensions
- Wheelbase: 2,390 mm (94.1 in)
- Length: 3,695 mm (145.5 in) (pre-facelift); 3,755 mm (147.8 in) (facelift); 3,765 mm (148.2 in) (Swift Sport)
- Width: 1,690 mm (66.5 in)
- Height: 1,510 mm (59.4 in) (FWD); 1,535 mm (60.4 in) (AWD)
- Curb weight: 1,000–1,100 kg (2,205–2,425 lb)

=== RS413/413D/415 ===
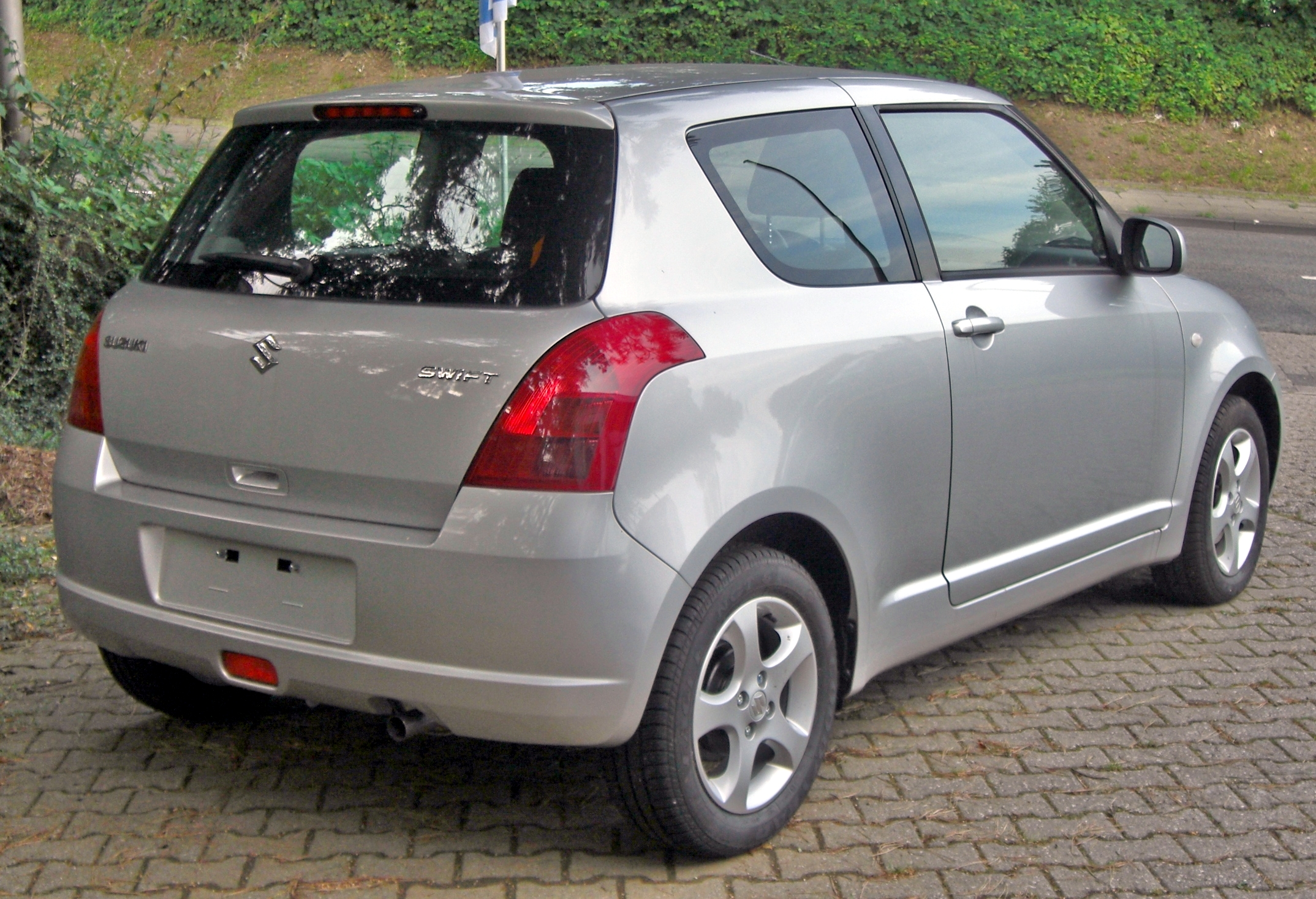
3-door hatchback (pre-facelift; Germany)

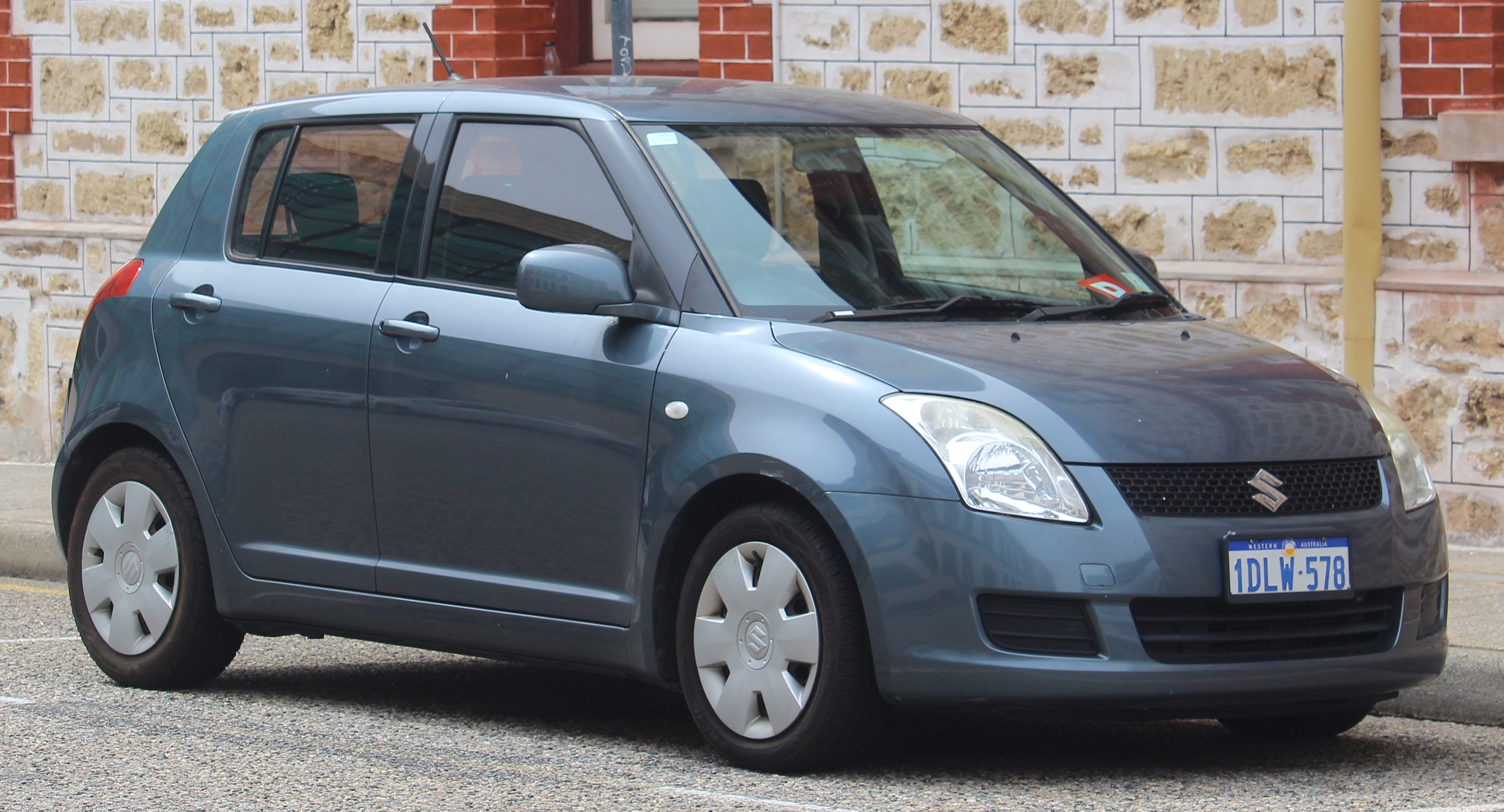

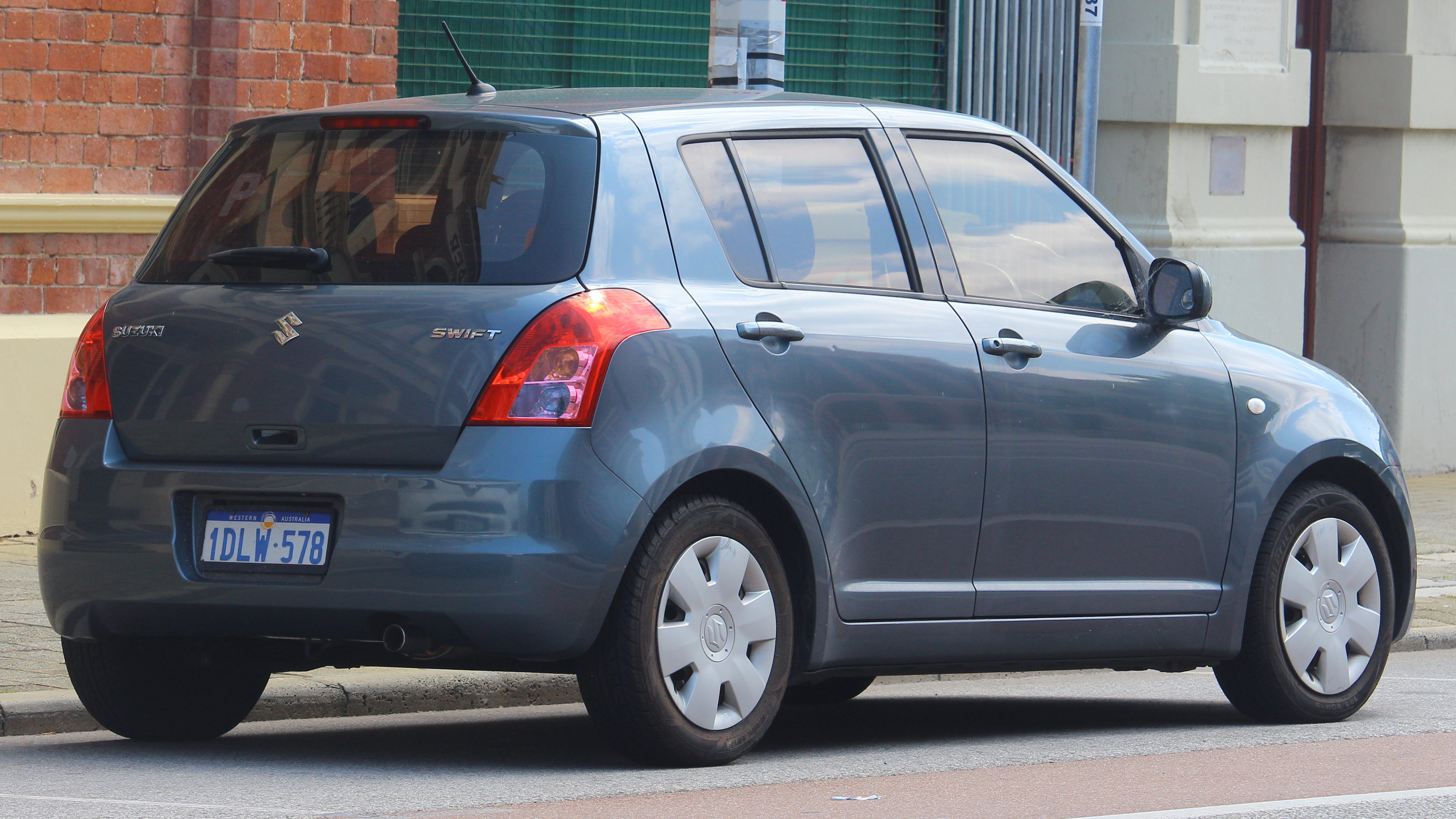
5-door hatchback (facelift; Australia)

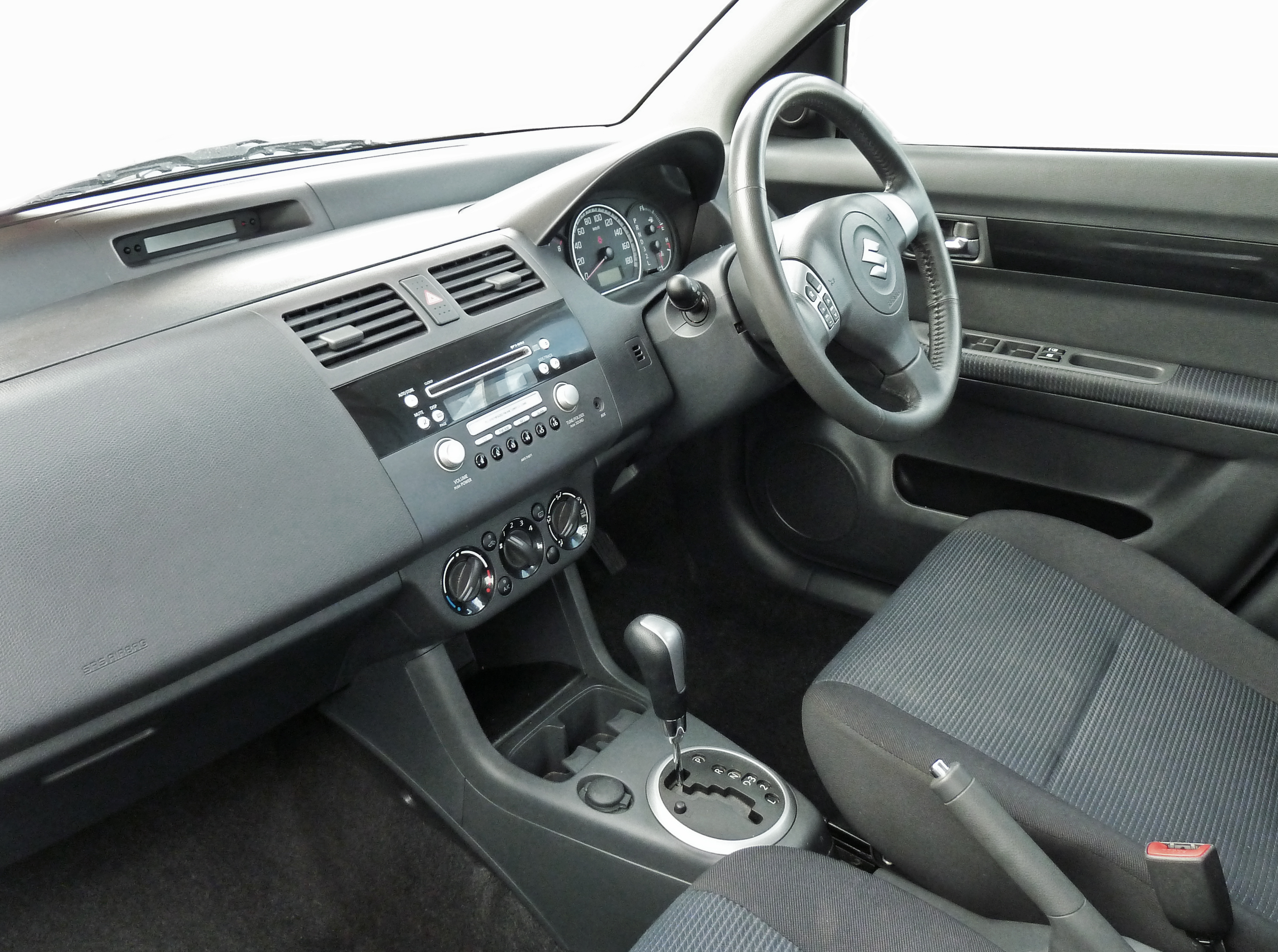
Interior

The global version of the first generation Swift was debuted at the Paris Motor Show in September 2004. The design of the Swift was previewed on the Concept S and Concept S2 concept cars at auto shows, in the years leading up to its launch. This generation of the Swift marked a significant departure with the previous Cultus-based models, with Suzuki redesigning the vehicle as less of a "low price alternative" subcompact and more of a "sporty" subcompact. The Swift's design and driving characteristics focused on the European market with its chassis refined through a road-testing program across Europe.

The first generation Swift has received four stars out of five ratings in the Euro NCAP crash tests. It also was awarded 2006 Semperit Irish Car of the Year in Ireland.

Since its global launch in 2005, which was kicked off with a marketing campaign fronted by the footballer Cristiano Ronaldo in many European countries, the Swift has recorded above forecast sales in most markets. In Japan, sales figures reached twice the numbers forecast.

The Swift was available with 1.3- and 1.5-liter gasoline engines, rated at 91 PS (67 kW; 90 bhp) and 102–110 PS (75–81 kW; 101–108 hp) respectively. It was produced in Hungary, India, Indonesia, Japan, Pakistan and by Chang'an Motors in China. In most markets, only the five-door body is available, and a four-wheel drive is an option for the 1.3- and 1.5-liter gasoline engines. A 92 PS (68 kW; 91 bhp) 1.25-liter engine fitted with an automatic continuously variable transmission (CVT) was offered in front-wheel drive only. In Europe, the Swift was launched in three- and five-door hatchback forms, with 1.3- and 1.5-liter gasoline engines, and a 1.25-liter (marketed as 1.3-liter) DDiS turbodiesel engine supplied by Fiat. Both the 1.3-liter and 1.5-liter gasoline models are available with four-wheel drive; these models receive the ZD11S and ZD21S chassis numbers.

In Taiwan, Suzuki's local partner Prince Motors began building the Swift in September 2005. Only offered with five-door bodywork, it was available in 1.5 GL or GLX trim; the 1.5-liter engine develops 74 kW ECE (100 PS), equivalent to 81 kW JIS (110 PS). After a falling out over Prince assembling Chinese cars, local assembly of Suzukis by Prince was halted in 2009. Pak Suzuki Motor Company Limited started producing the first generation Swift in November 2009 and only available with 1.3-liter M13A gasoline engine and paired with either 5-speed manual or 4-speed automatic transmissions. The first generation Swift was discontinued in Pakistan in August 2021.

In Indonesia, the earlier Swift was imported from Japan and from 2007 to 2011, it was assembled locally at Suzuki Indomobil Motor's production plant in Bekasi, West Java. It was only offered with a 1.5-liter M15A gasoline engine, mates with either 5-speed manual or 4-speed automatic transmissions. There were several special editions with Swift Sport bumpers, sold as GT (2007), GT2 (2009) and GT3 (2010), respectively. There was also a special edition called GTS with body kits launched in July 2009.

The Maruti Suzuki Swift was launched in India on 25 May 2005 with the familiar 1.3-liter SOHC 16-valve G13BB gasoline engine seen in Maruti Esteem. Later, in early 2007, Maruti introduced the Swift with a Fiat-sourced 1.25-liter D13A DDiS turbodiesel engine. In 2010, due to the new BS-IV emission norms, Maruti replaced the 1.3-liter gasoline engine with the more modern 1.2-liter DOHC (later model has VVT) K12M engine.

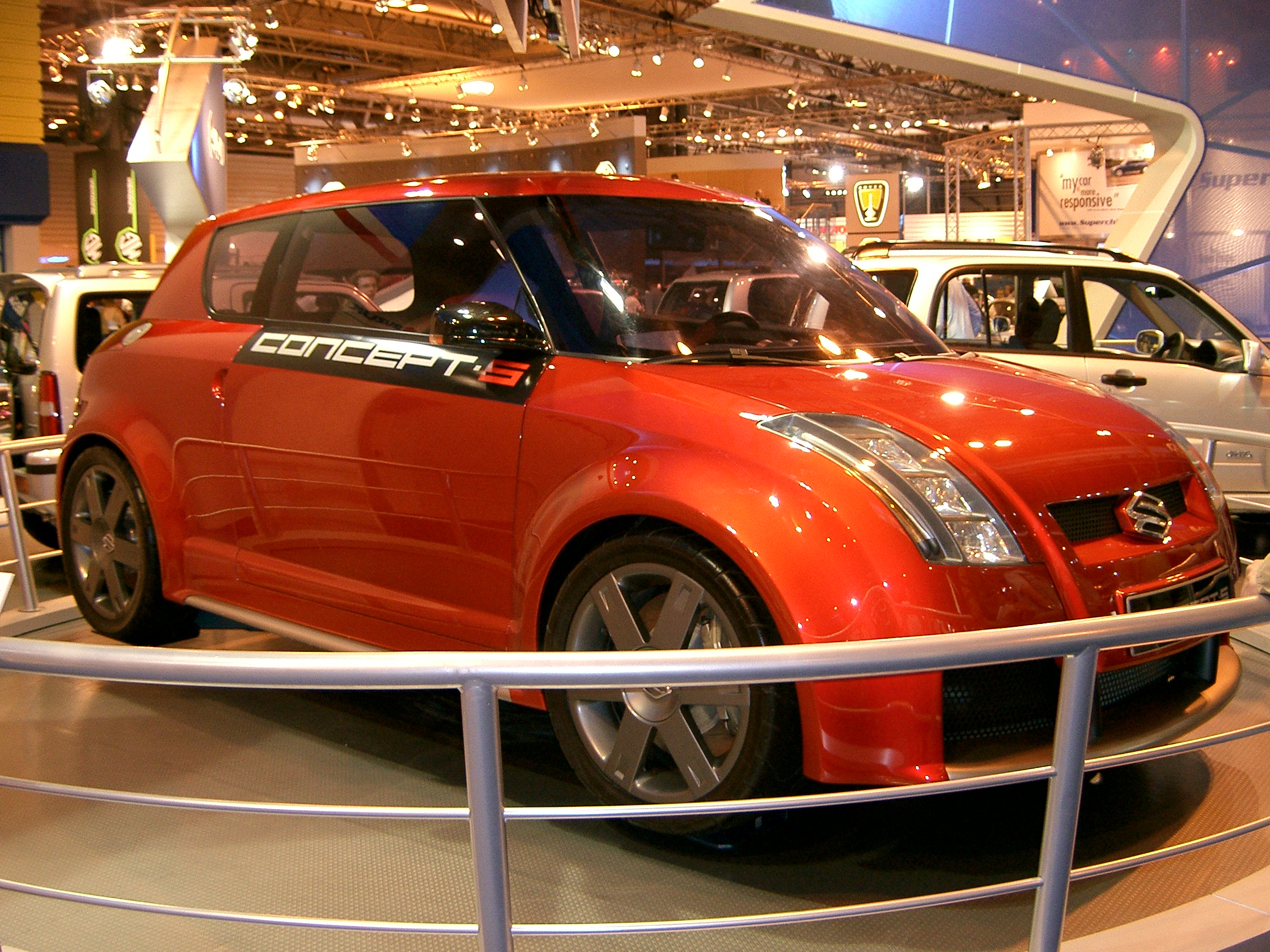
Suzuki Concept S (2002)

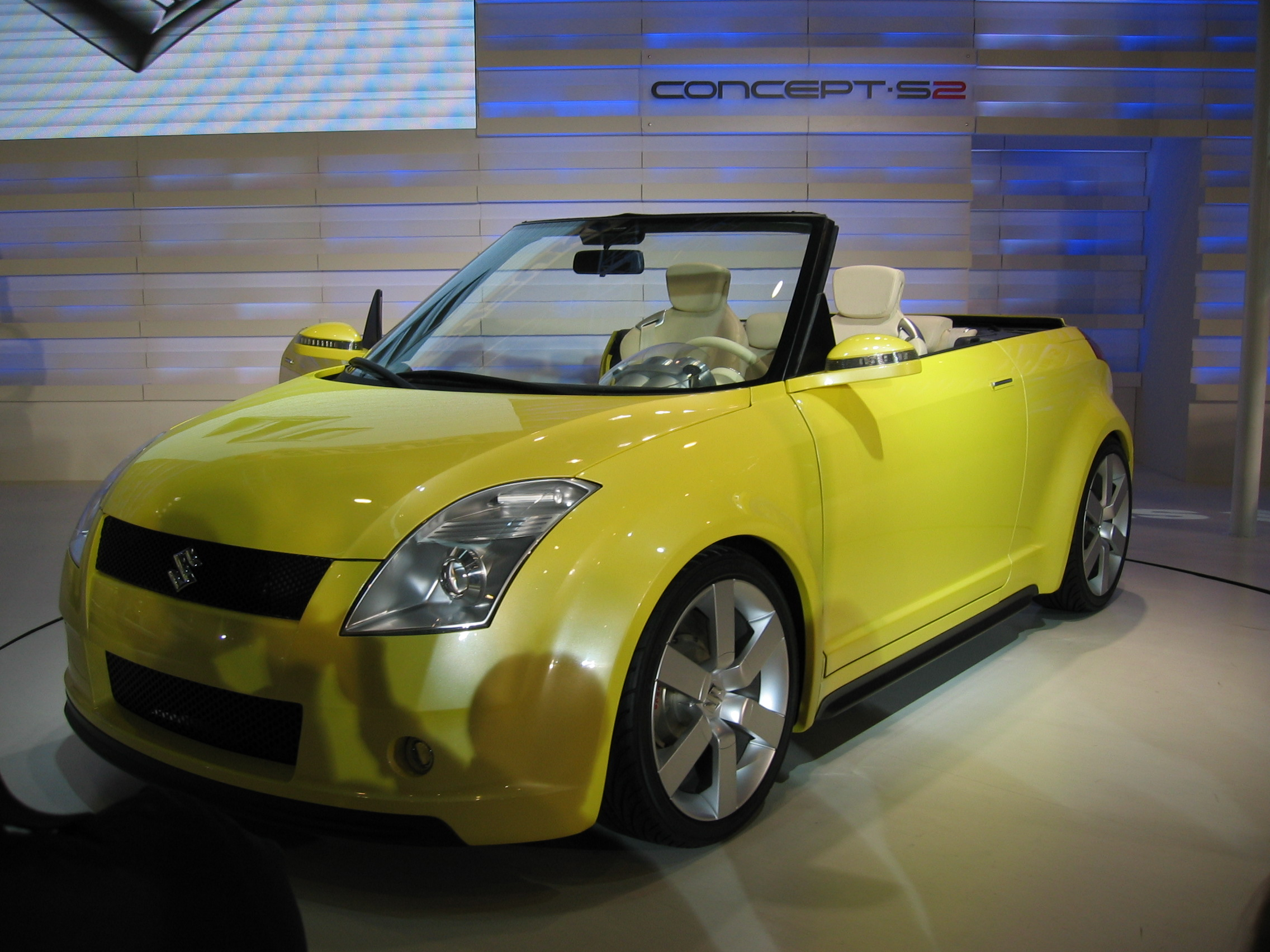
Suzuki Concept S2 (2003)

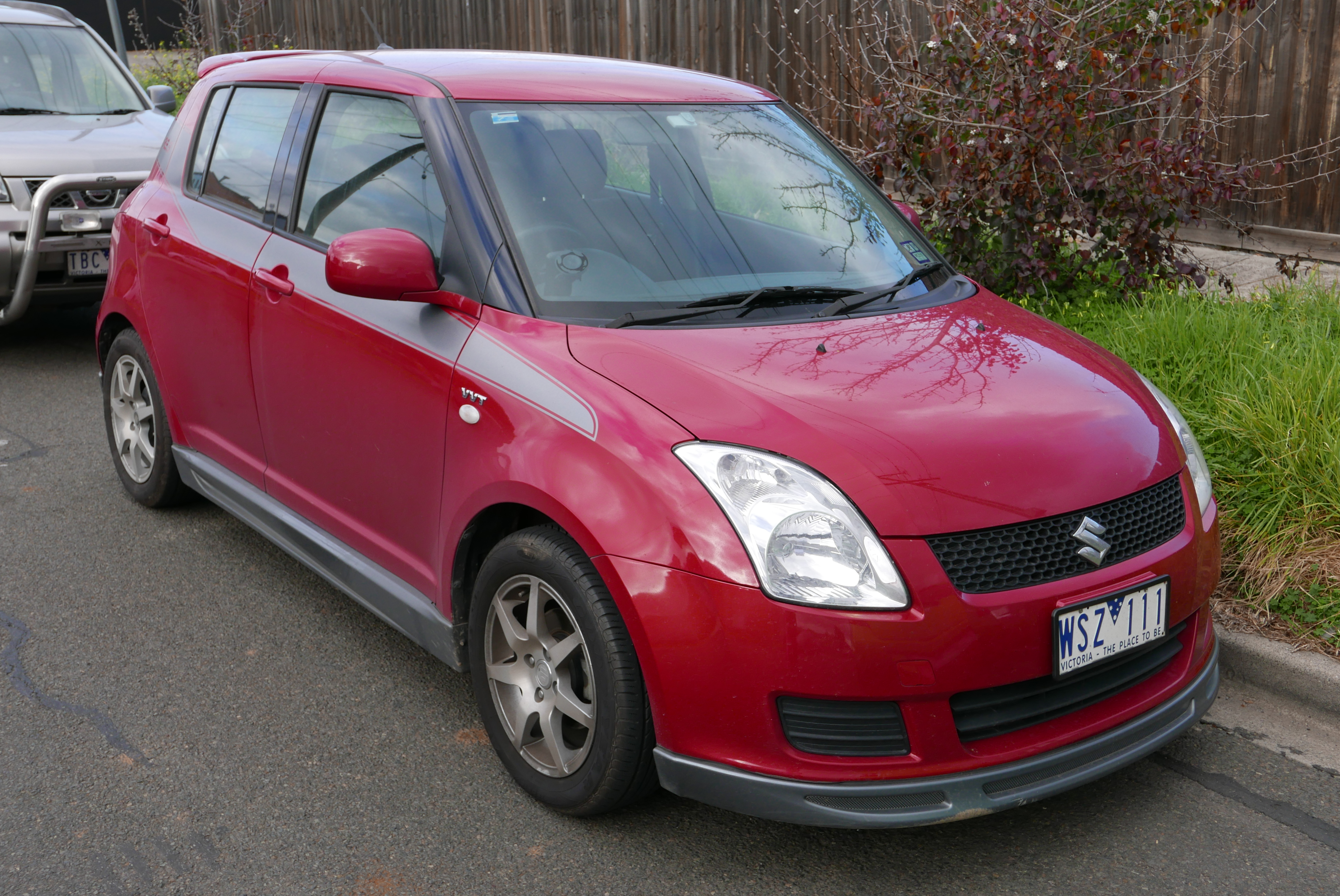
Suzuki Swift RE.3 Edition (Australia)

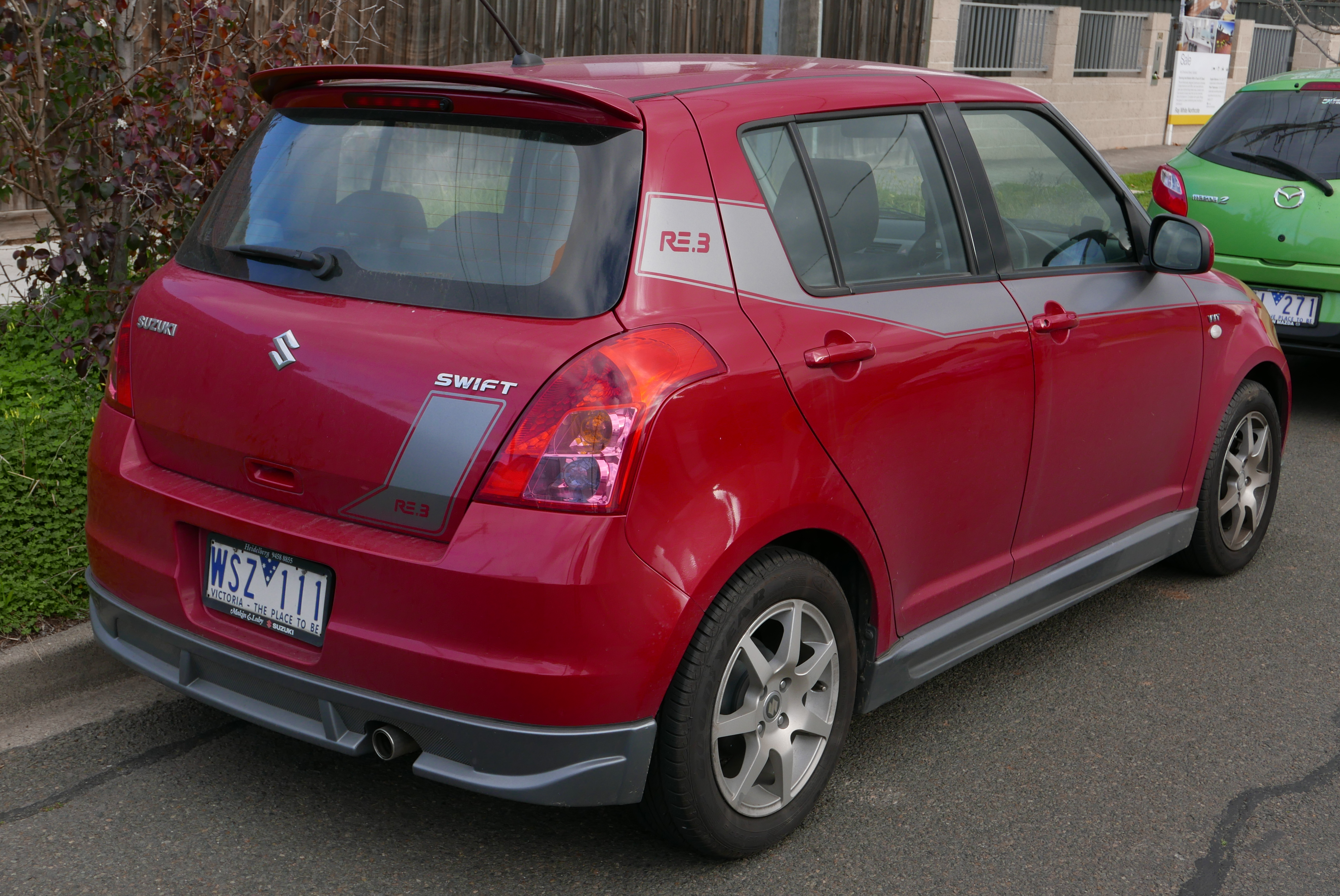
Suzuki Swift RE.3 Edition (Australia)

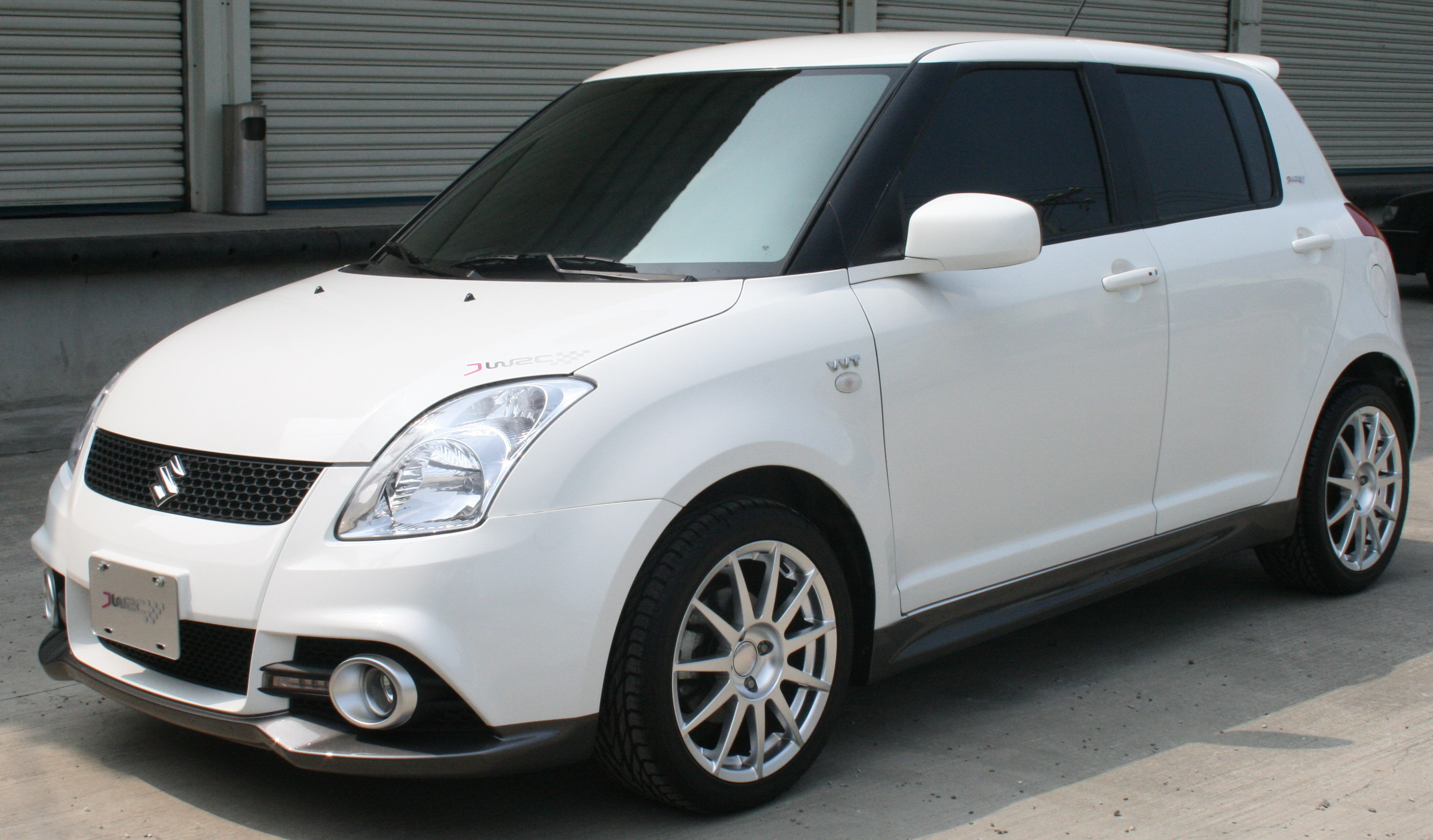
Suzuki Swift GT3 Edition (Indonesia)

=== Changan Suzuki Swift ===
Suzuki's joint venture in China, Changan Suzuki, started producing the Swift for the Chinese domestic market in Chongqing from July 2005. Two gasoline engines were available; 1.3-liter SOHC G13BB engine producing 63 kW; 84 hp (85 PS) and 1.5-liter DOHC VVT M15A engine producing 74 kW; 99 hp (100 PS). Both engines are mated with a 5-speed manual transmission, while the latter was available with a 4-speed automatic transmission option. A limited edition Swift with new sporty bumpers called Champion Edition was introduced in June 2010.

While the new generation Swift was prepared for the global market, Changan Suzuki continued producing this generation by giving its first facelift by using Swift Sport bumpers and rear lights in October 2010, skipped the 2007 facelift for the global market model. Suzuki did testing the new generation Swift in China but decided only offered the Japanese imported high performance Swift Sport instead.

The second facelift occurred in January 2013 and it has similar front bumper styling as the refreshed second generation Swift.

Sales ended when Suzuki decided to withdraw from Chinese market to focus in India in September 2018. Over 350,000 units Swift were sold in China from 2005 to 2019.

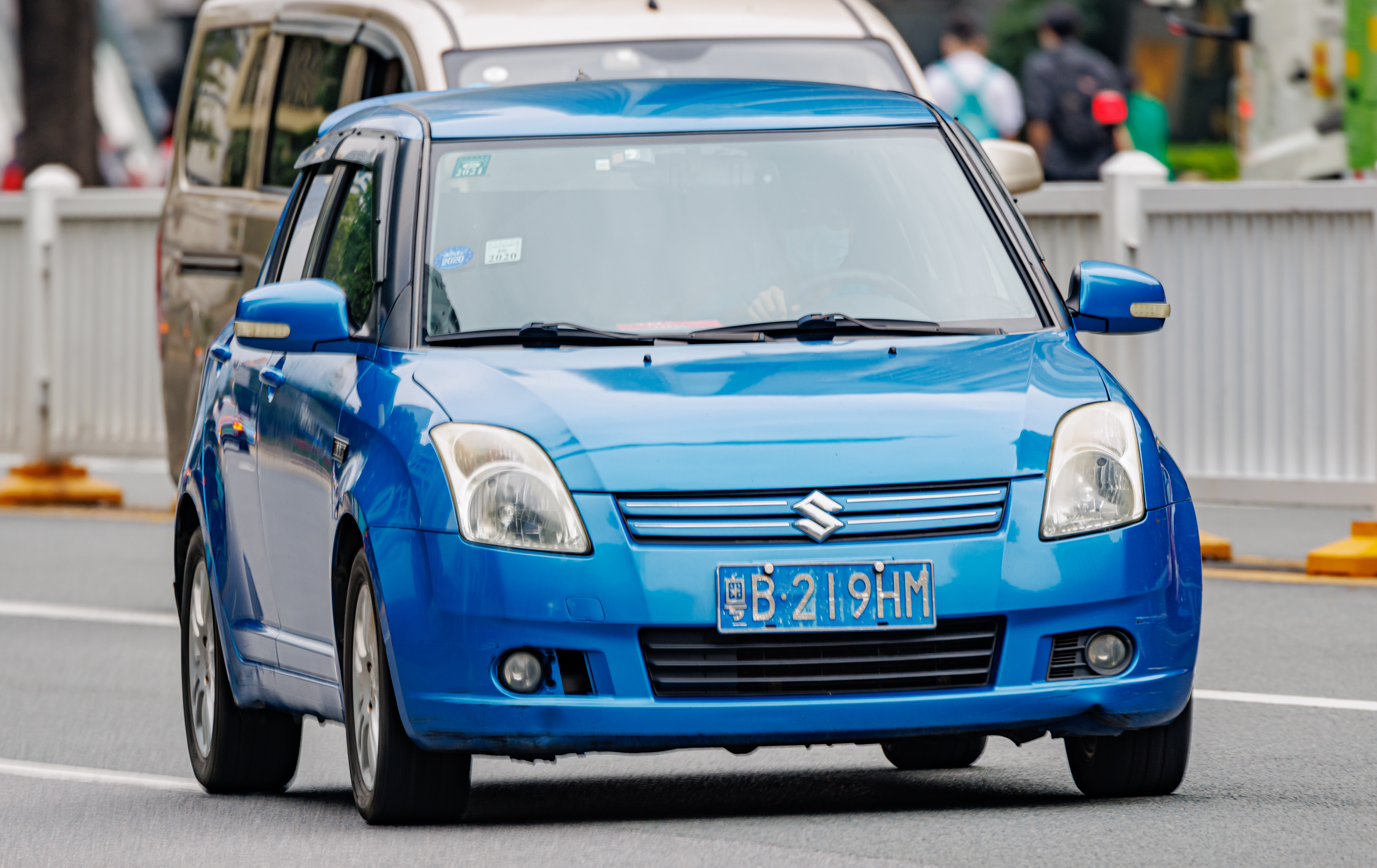
Pre-facelift (China)

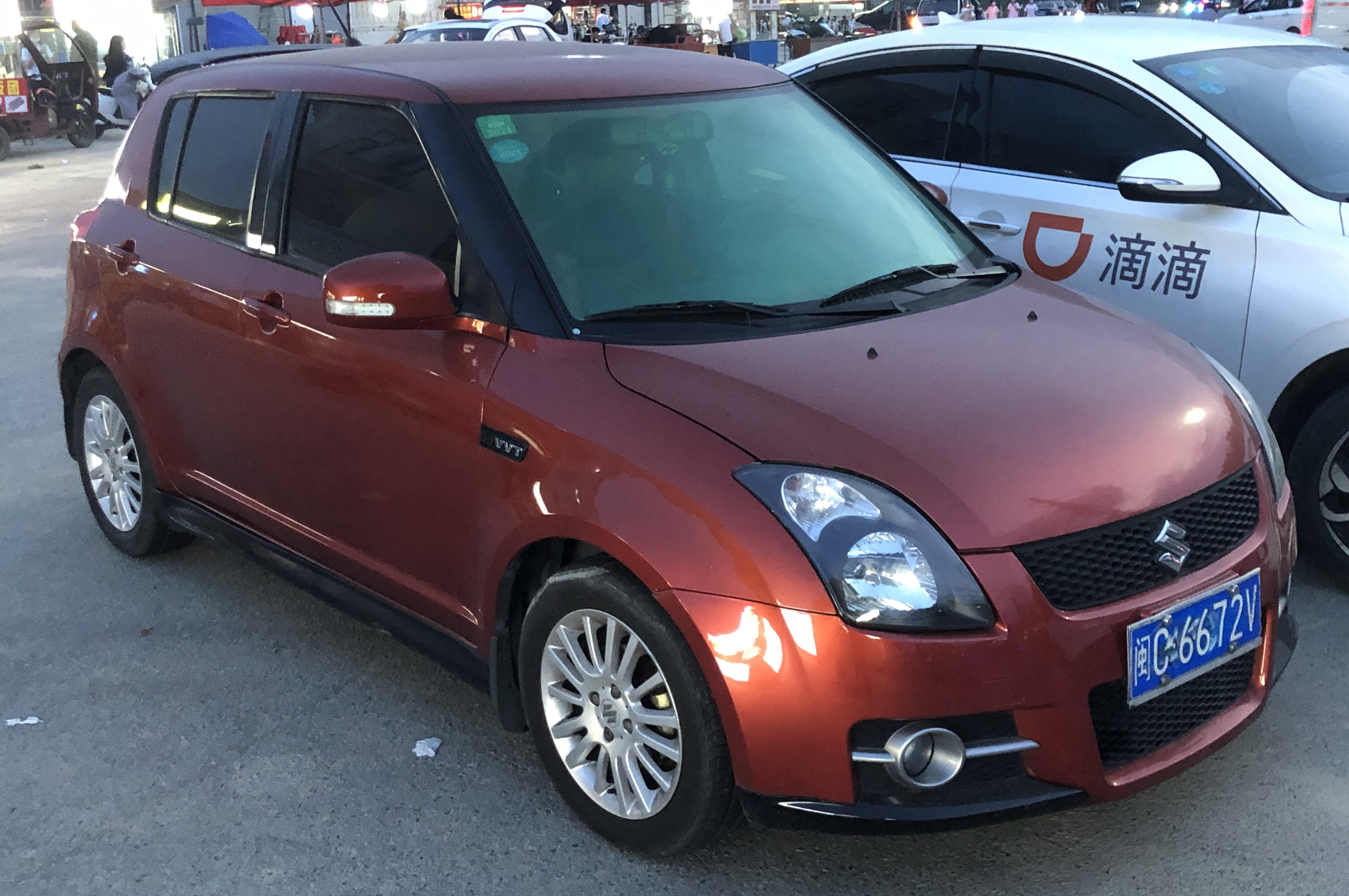
First facelift with Swift Sport bumpers (China)

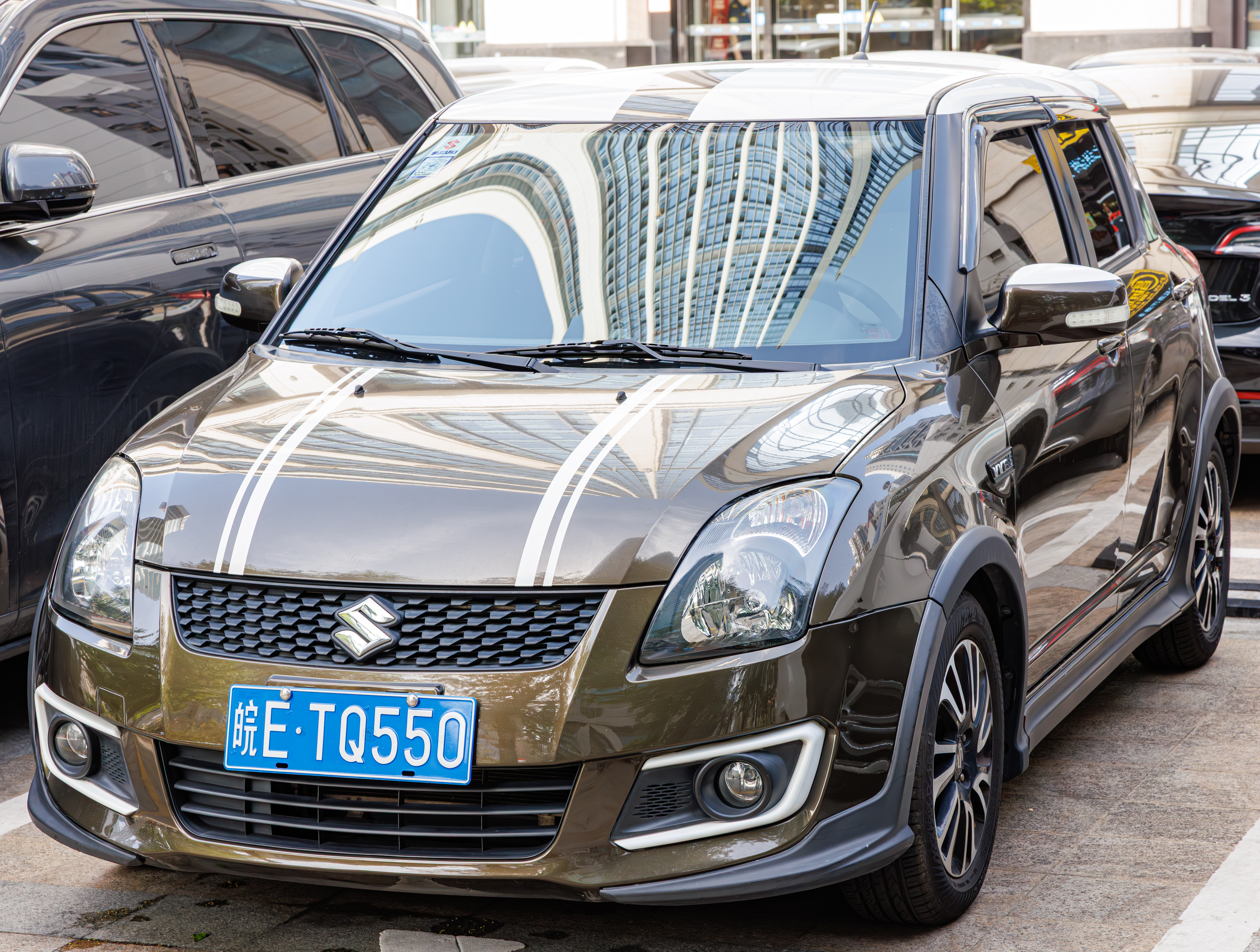
Second facelift with second generation 2013 facelift styling (China)

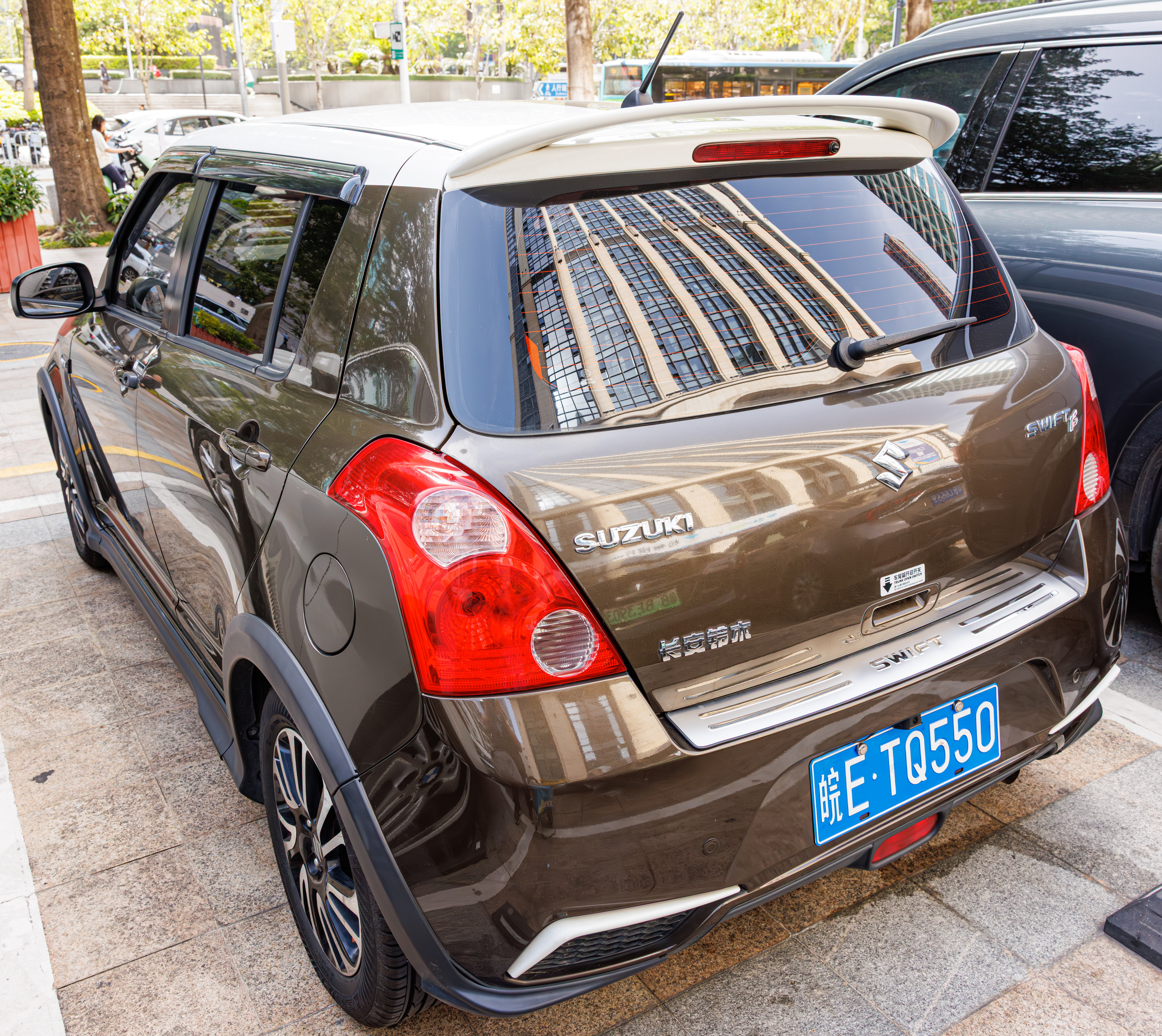
Rear view of second facelift (China)

=== Swift Sport (RS416/ZC31S) ===
In September 2005, Suzuki launched the Sport version of the new Swift in Japan, and in September 2006 the model was introduced in most European markets. Named "Swift Sport", it is powered by an enhanced M16A unit, a high-revving 1.6-liter, naturally aspirated DOHC VVT four-cylinder engine with an 11.1:1 compression ratio, four-bolt mains, chain-driven high-lift cams with solid lifters, forged pistons cooled by oil squirters, an internally polished intake manifold and strengthened valve springs. The 1.6-liter engine produces 92 kW; 123 bhp (125 PS) and 148 newton-metres (109 lb⋅ft) torque. At 3,765 mm (148.2 in), the car is 70 mm (2.8 in) longer than the standard Swift. The Swift Sport features sportier bumpers and spoilers, a stiffer suspension, twin exhaust pipes, red sport seats (with Recaro seats optional) and four-wheel disc brakes on 16-inch wheels. The European Swift Sport features five-speed manual transmission, the three-door body variant, 17-inch wheels (16-inch also available) and electronic stability control (ESC).

In July 2008, Suzuki Germany launched a limited edition of Swift Sport called N'Style Rally to pay tribute to the Suzuki's Group N Junior World Rally Championship car and only limited to 500 units. It was offered exclusively in black and is covered with Suzuki Motorsport's logos and decals.

In 2007, Suzuki Arena Kyoto Rakunan, a Suzuki dealership located in Kyoto prefecture collaborated with Japanese tuner Tommykaira to modify the Swift Sport; the resulting model was sold as Tommykaira S-Ss (Super Swift Sports).

In 2008, the Swift Sport underwent a minor restyling which mostly changed the interior and gear ratios. The final drive ratio was shortened from 4.235 to 4.388 for better acceleration, while the redline was raised to 7200 rpm from the earlier 6800, which is reflected on the changed rev counter.

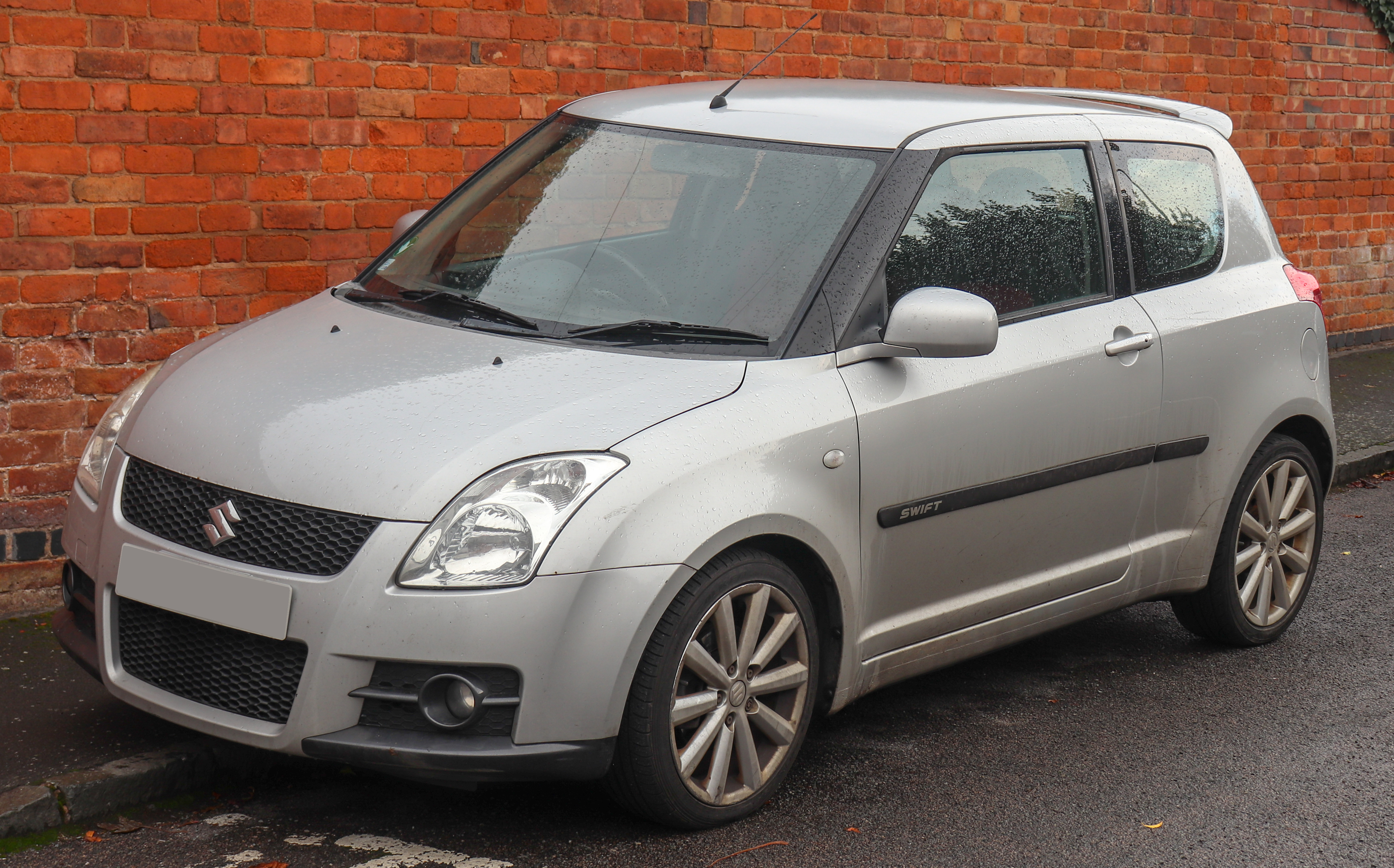
Suzuki Swift Sport 3-door (UK)

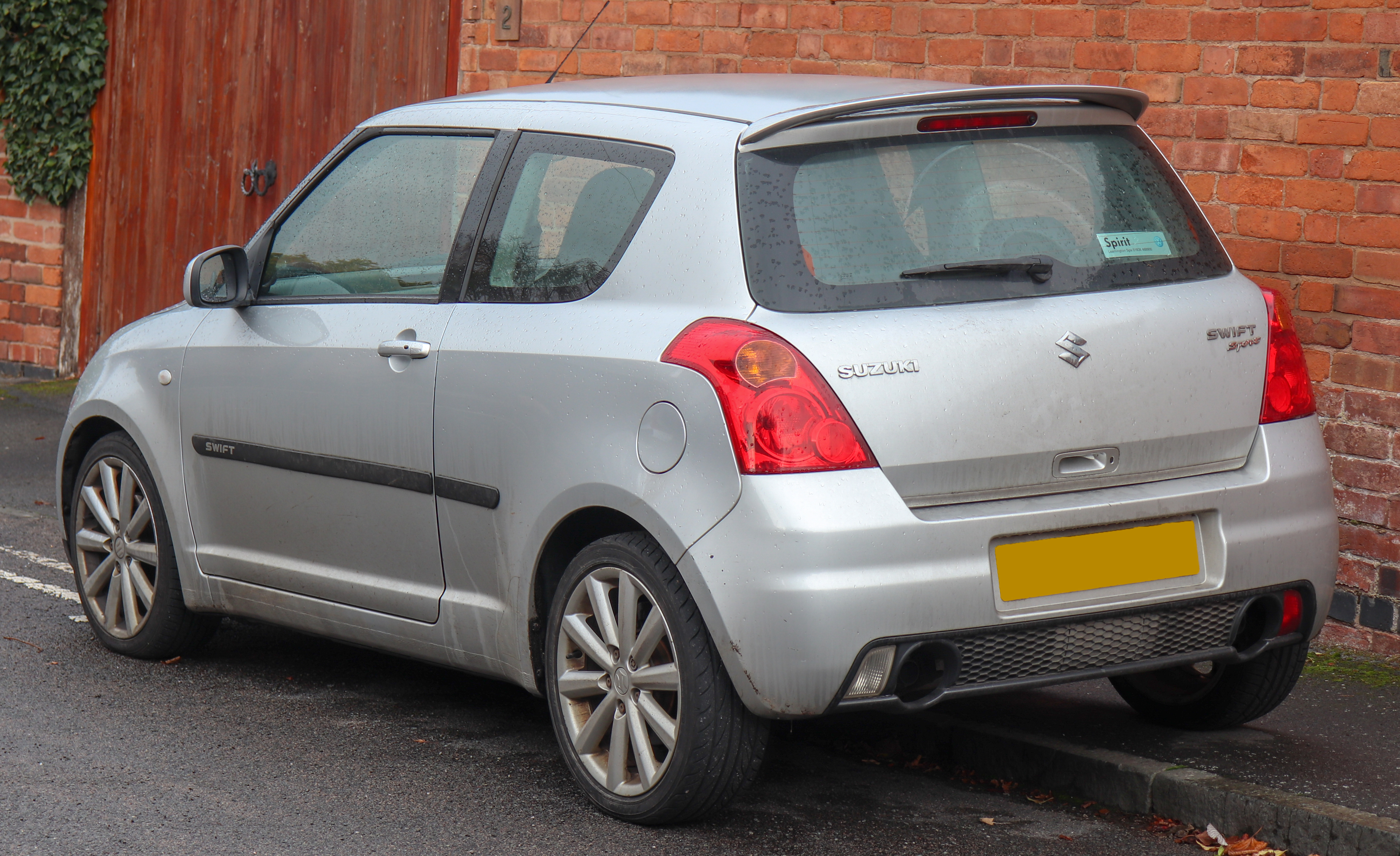
Suzuki Swift Sport 3-door (UK)

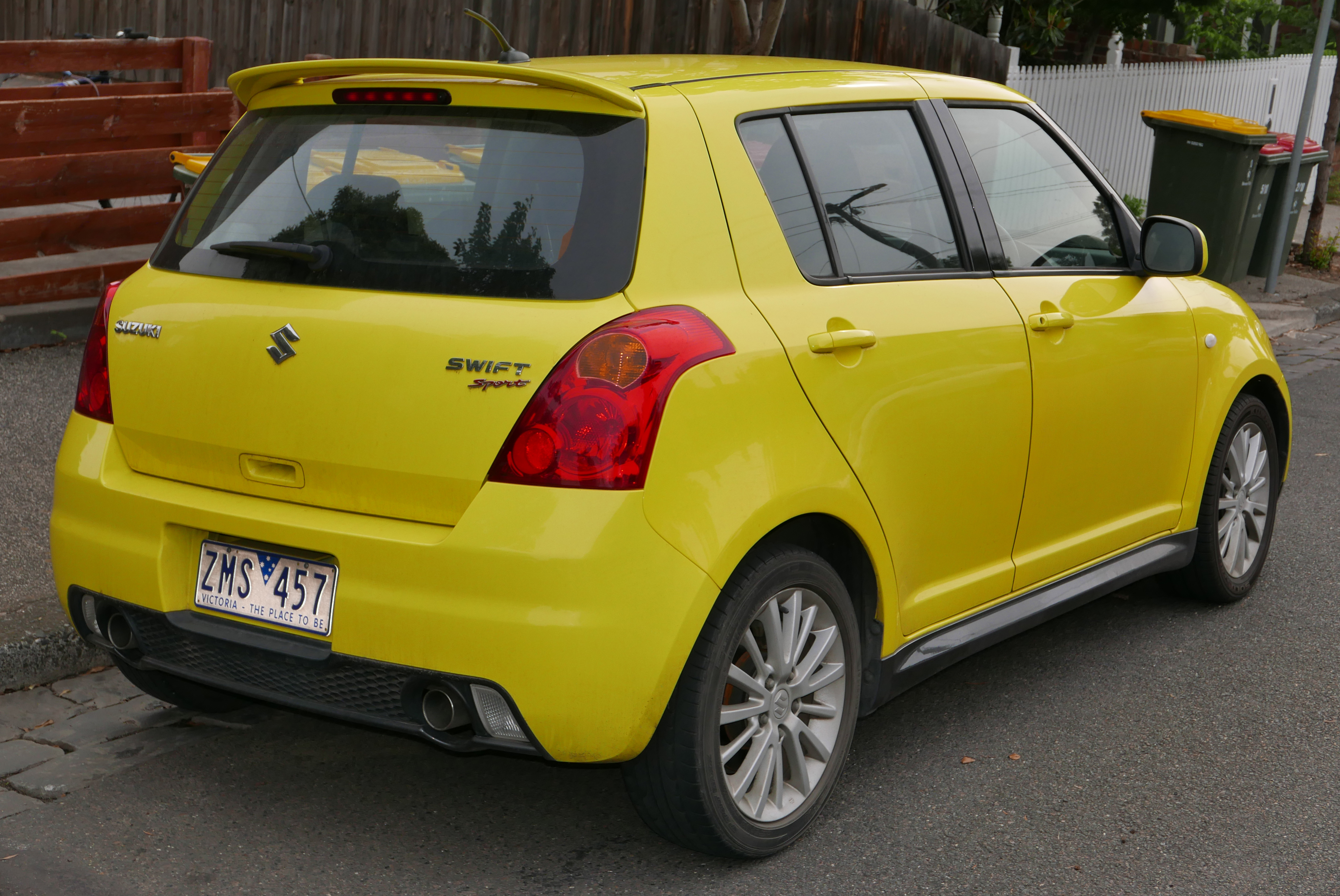
Suzuki Swift Sport 5-door (Australia)

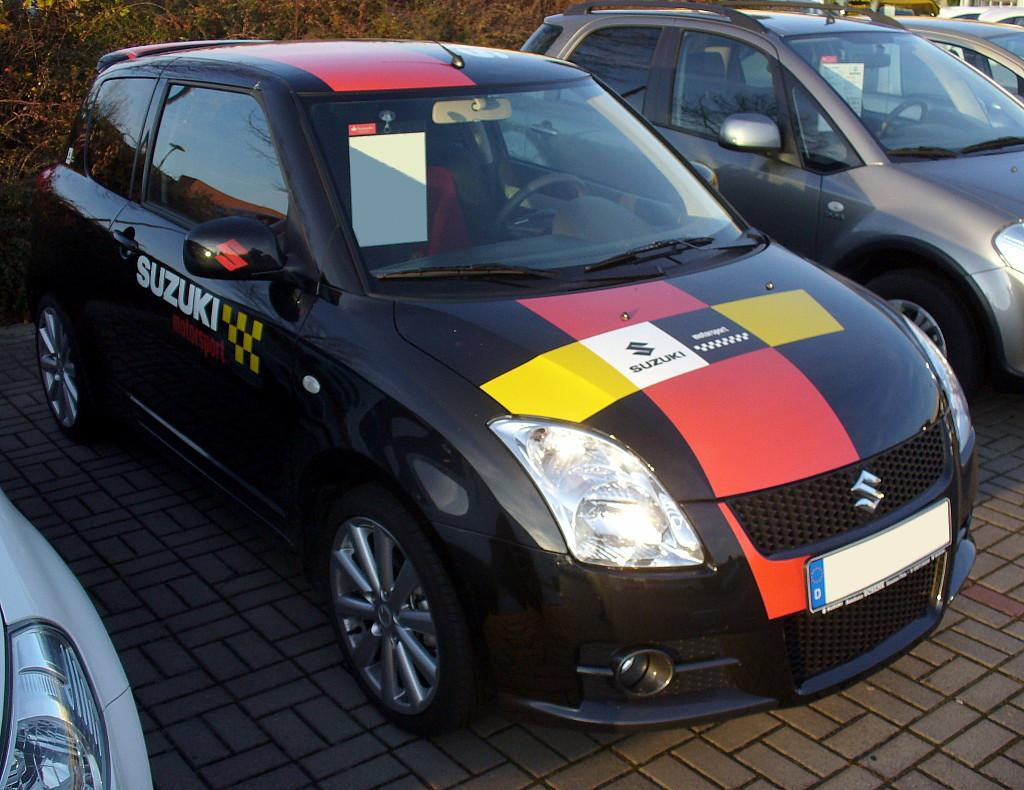
Suzuki Swift Sport N'Style Rally Edition (Germany)

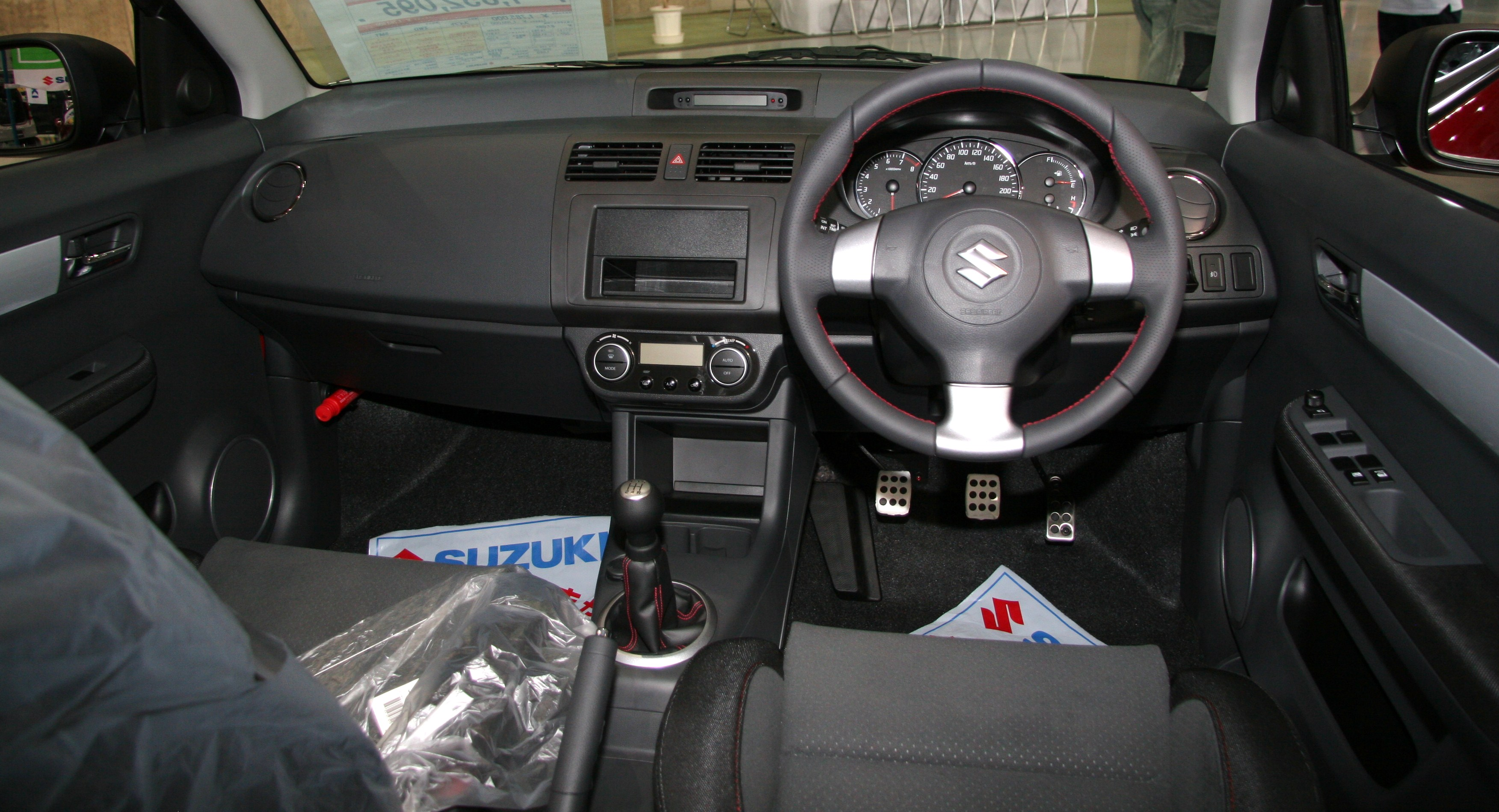
interior

=== Engines ===
	1.3	1.5	1.6	1.3 DDiS
Engine:	inline-4 gasoline			inline-4 diesel
Displacement:	1328 cc	1490 cc	1586 cc	1248 cc
Power/rpm:	68 kW (92 PS)/5800	75 kW (102 PS)/5900	92 kW (125 PS)/6800	51 kW (69 PS)/4000
Torque:	116 Nm/4200	133 Nm/4100	148 Nm/4800	190 Nm/1750–2250
Gearbox, standard:	5-speed manual			
Gearbox, optional:	5-speed automatic	4-speed automatic	—	
Weight:	1045–1135 kg	1095 kg	1105 kg	1140 kg
Top speed:	167–175 km/h	180–185 km/h	200 km/h	165 km/h
Acceleration, 0–100 km/h:	11.0–12.5 s	10.0–11.7 s	8.9 s	13.7 s
Fuel consumption on 100 km (combined):	5.8–6.2 L super	6.5 L super	7.0 L super	4.5 L diesel

=== Safety ===
ANCAP test results* Suzuki Swift variants with side curtain airbags (2005)
Test	Score
Overall	4 /5 stars
Frontal offset	10.79/16
Side impact	15.73/16
Pole	2/2
Seat belt reminders	0/3
Whiplash protection	Not Assessed
Pedestrian protection	Adequate
Electronic stability control	Not Assessed

- Euro NCAP (2005) –

== Second generation (AZG; 2010) ==
Second generation
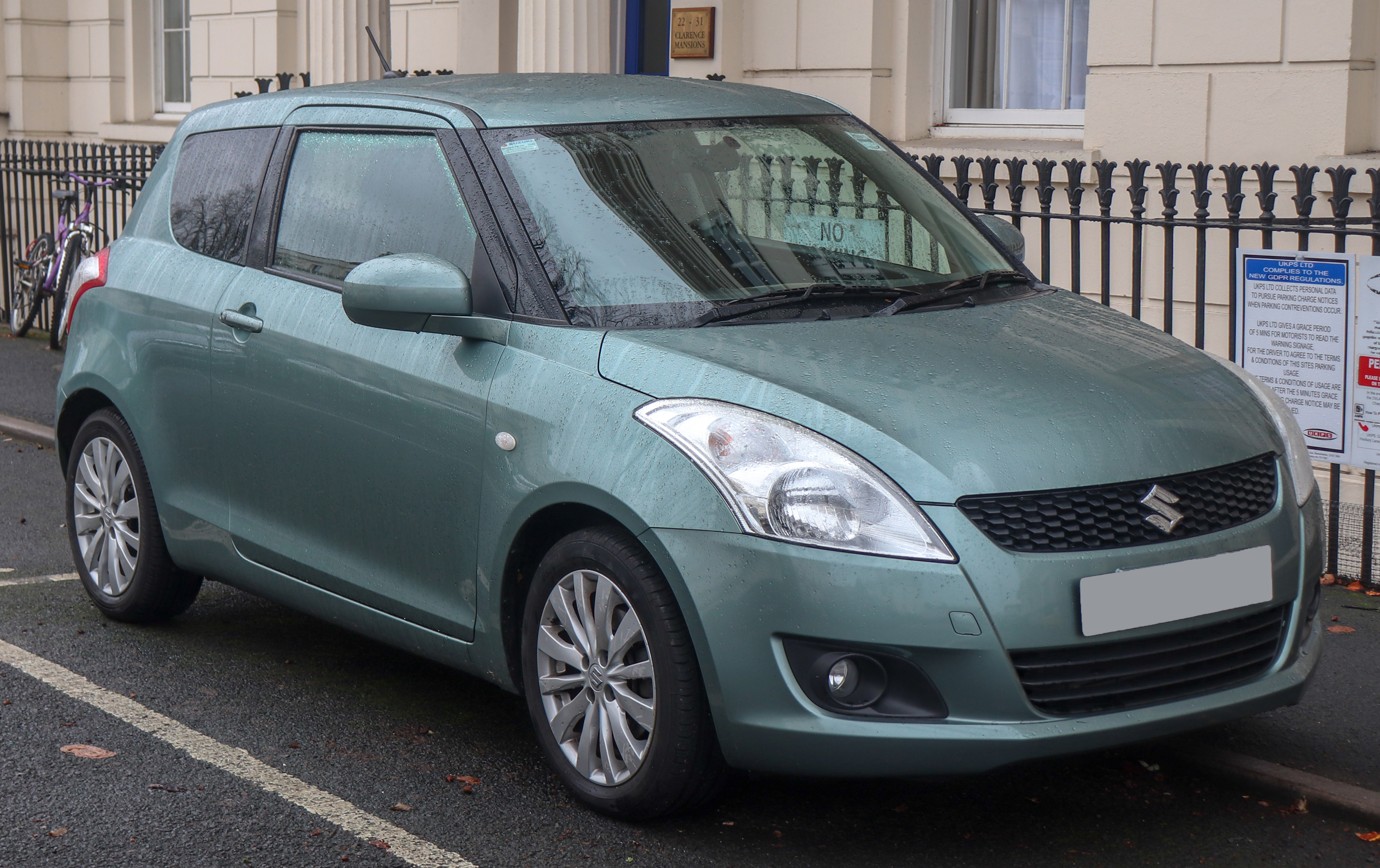
- 3-door hatchback (pre-facelift; UK)

Overview
- Model code: AZG
- Production: June 2010 – April 2017
- Assembly: Japan: Makinohara (Sagara Plant); Hungary: Esztergom (Magyar Suzuki; from June 2010); India: Manesar (Maruti Suzuki); Thailand: Rayong (Suzuki Motor Thailand; from March 2012); Malaysia: Pekan (HICOM; 2013–2015); Vietnam: Biên Hòa (Vietnam Suzuki Corp.; from January 2014)
- Designer: Hisanori Matsushima, Hirohito Matsumoto, Tetsuya Ozasa, Akihito Igarashi, Takashi Maeda and Hiroyuki Tokuda

Body and chassis
- Related: Suzuki Swift Dzire; Suzuki Ertiga (ZE)

Powertrain
- Engine: Gasoline: 1.2 L K12M I4 (ZC62S); 1.25 L K12B I4 (ZC/ZD72S); 1.4 L K14B I4 (ZC82S); 1.6 L M16A I4 (ZC32S); Diesel: 1.3 L D13A DDiS I4-TD
- Transmission: 5-speed Aisin manual; 6-speed Aisin manual; 4-speed Aisin automatic; Jatco CVT

Dimensions
- Wheelbase: 2,430 mm (95.7 in)
- Length: 3,850 mm (151.6 in); 3,875 mm (152.6 in) (RS facelift); 3,890 mm (153.1 in) (Swift Sport)
- Width: 1,695 mm (66.7 in)
- Height: 1,510 mm (59.4 in) (FWD); 1,535 mm (60.4 in) (AWD)
- Curb weight: 960–1,090 kg (2,120–2,400 lb)

=== AZG412/413D/414 ===
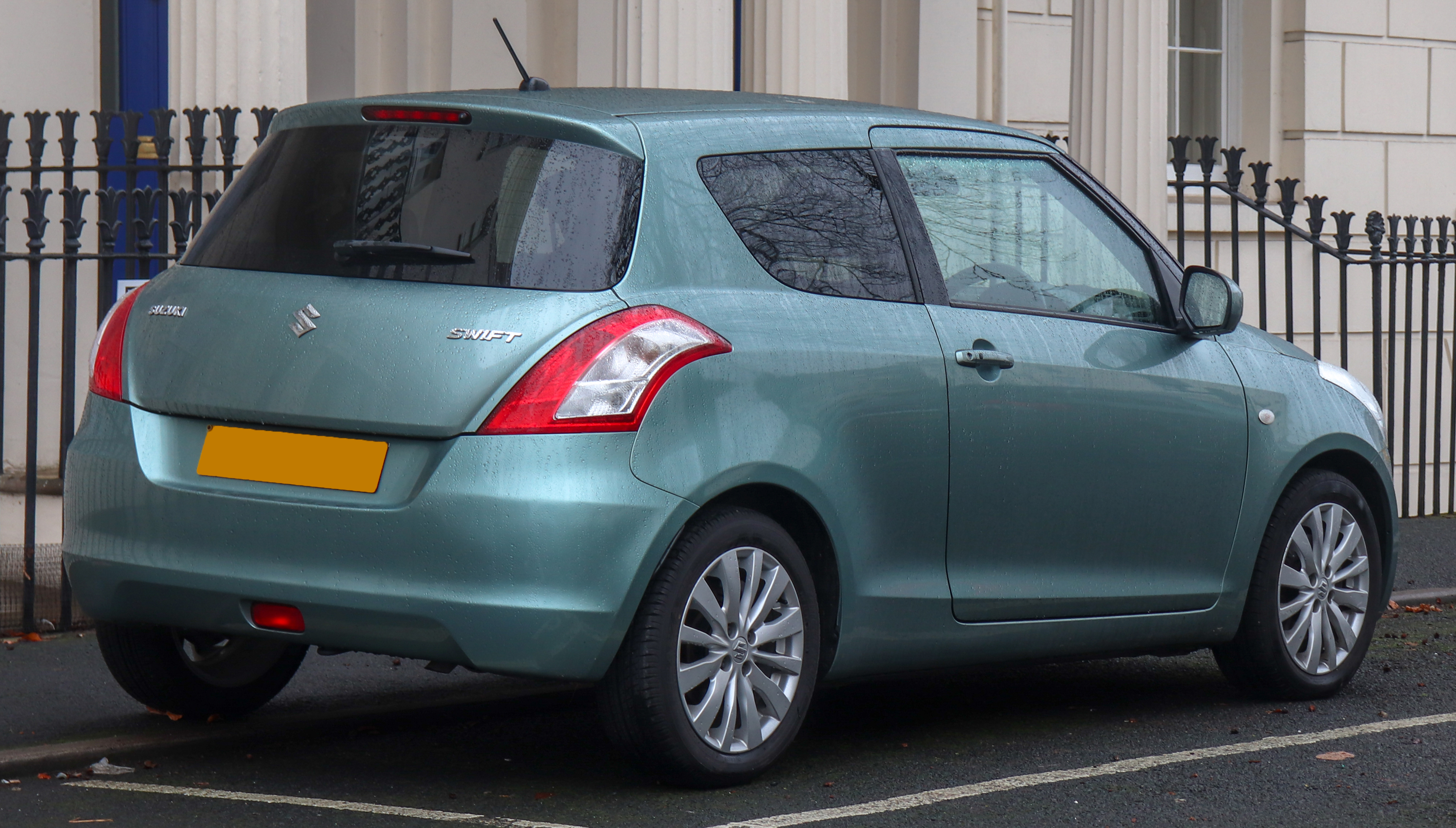
3-door hatchback (pre-facelift, UK)

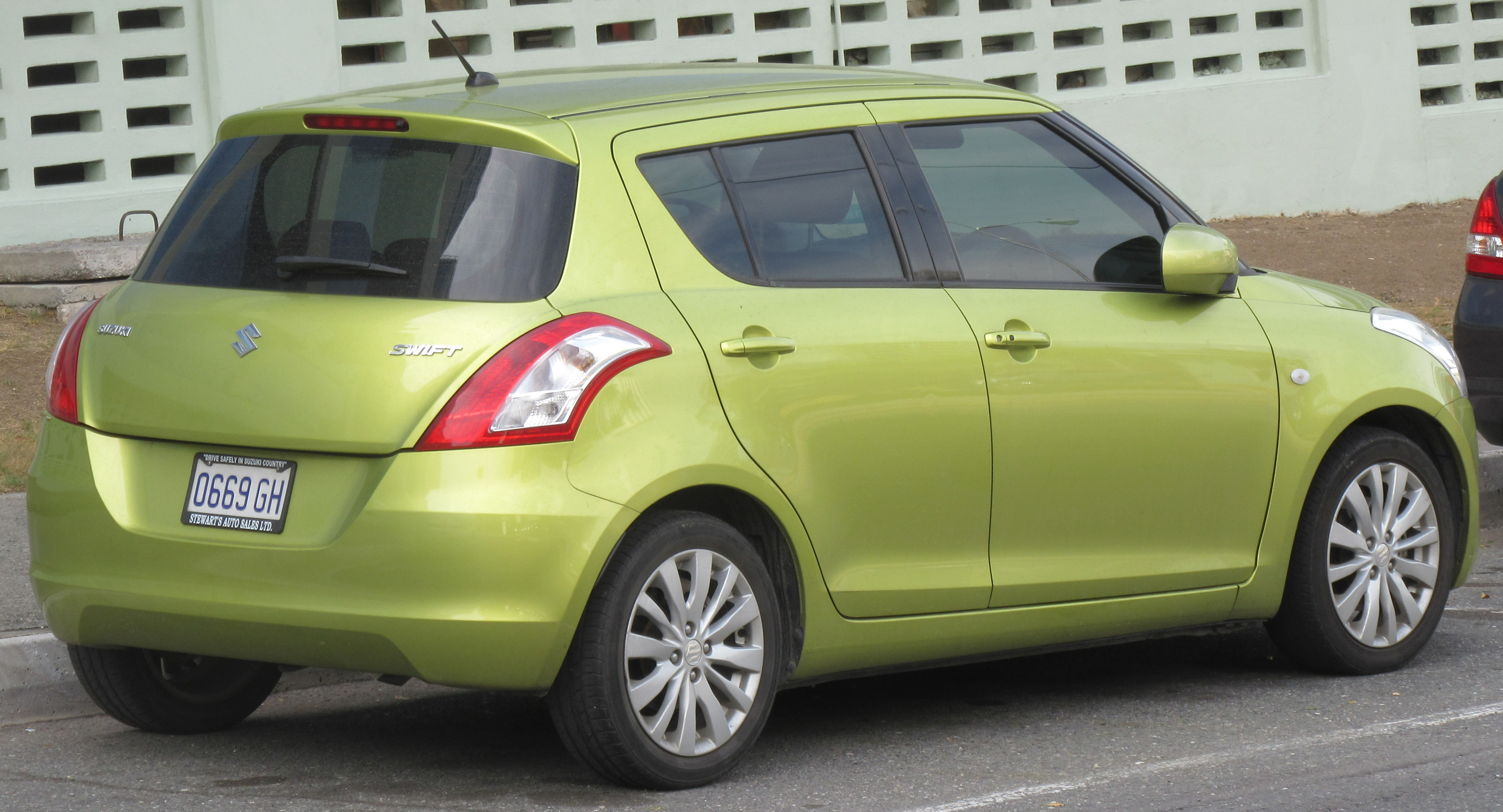
5-door hatchback (pre-facelift; Jamaica)

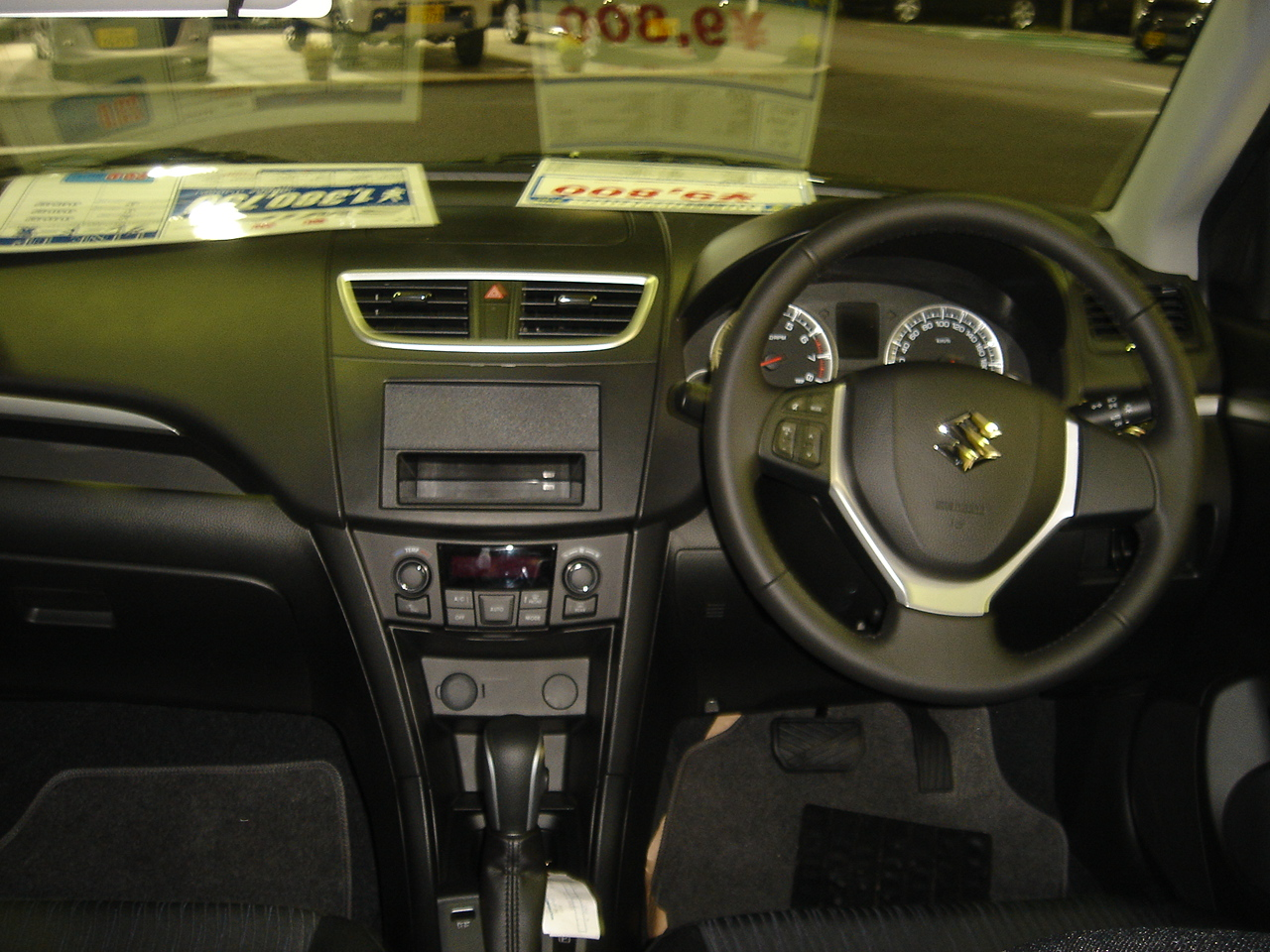
Interior

The second generation Swift was unveiled on 25 March 2010. It went on sale in Japan on 18 September 2010. The second generation Swift production at Suzuki's plant in Hungary started on 11 June 2010 to be supplied across Europe. The new car has its wheelbase extended by 50 mm (2.0 in) over the previous generation and has many visual updates. While the new car looks different from the old one, its design is an evolution of the radical first generation styling with a longer and more rounded appearance. During September 2010, Suzuki in the United Kingdom released the second generation Swift onto British roads. It was launched into the Indian market in 2011.

The new generation is expected to feature a 1.25-liter VVT gasoline engine (K12B) developing 68 kW; 91 bhp (92 PS). In some countries, the second generation of Suzuki Swift uses a 1.4-liter VVT gasoline engine (K14B) which produces 70 kW; 94 bhp (95 PS).

In Thailand, the Swift was built locally since March 2012 and is part of the Thai government's eco-car program. The car was sold there with a CVT automatic transmission on GA, GL and GLX variants; GA and GL variants are also offered with a five-speed manual transmission, without anti-lock brakes. Another variant with the Japanese market RS body kit was later added, as the RX trim.

For the Indonesian market, the Swift was launched on 20 September 2012 at the 20th Indonesia International Motor Show and sold in two trim levels: GL and GX, both available with manual or automatic transmission. The GS trim level was added on 6 June 2015, which was launched at the 2015 Jakarta Fair. The GS trim added HID projector headlights equipped with auto-levelling. Sales of the Swift in that market ended in April 2017. It was replaced by the Baleno hatchback in August 2017, which is slightly bigger and positioned in the same class as the second generation Swift, as the third generation Swift was not released in that market.

For the Malaysian market, the Swift was released in January 2013, imported from Thailand. It is available with three trim levels; GL, GLX and GLX-S. The CKD version was later launched in May 2013. A limited edition called RS based on GLX trim with GLX-S' body kit, decals and red accents interior was launched later in June 2014. The facelifted model launched in July 2015 and followed by RR2 special edition based on GL trim in September.

=== 2013 update ===
In July 2013, Suzuki updated the Swift with some minor cosmetic changes such as a revised front bumper, L-shaped LED daytime running lights on the foglamp housings, fresh 16-inch wheels, LED-type high-level brake lamp and new seat fabric design.

For the Japanese market, it features Suzuki's newly developed Dualjet engine as well as Suzuki's ENE-CHARGE system and ECO-COOL, implemented from the Suzuki Wagon R. The new Dualjet engine uses the dual-injection system on its 1.25-liter gasoline engine and it works by increasing vaporisation, making combustion more efficient. It channels fuel to two intake ports instead of only one per cylinder. With the Dualjet technology and the ENE-CHARGE, fuel economy is now up to 26.4 km/L, calculated based on JC08 mode.

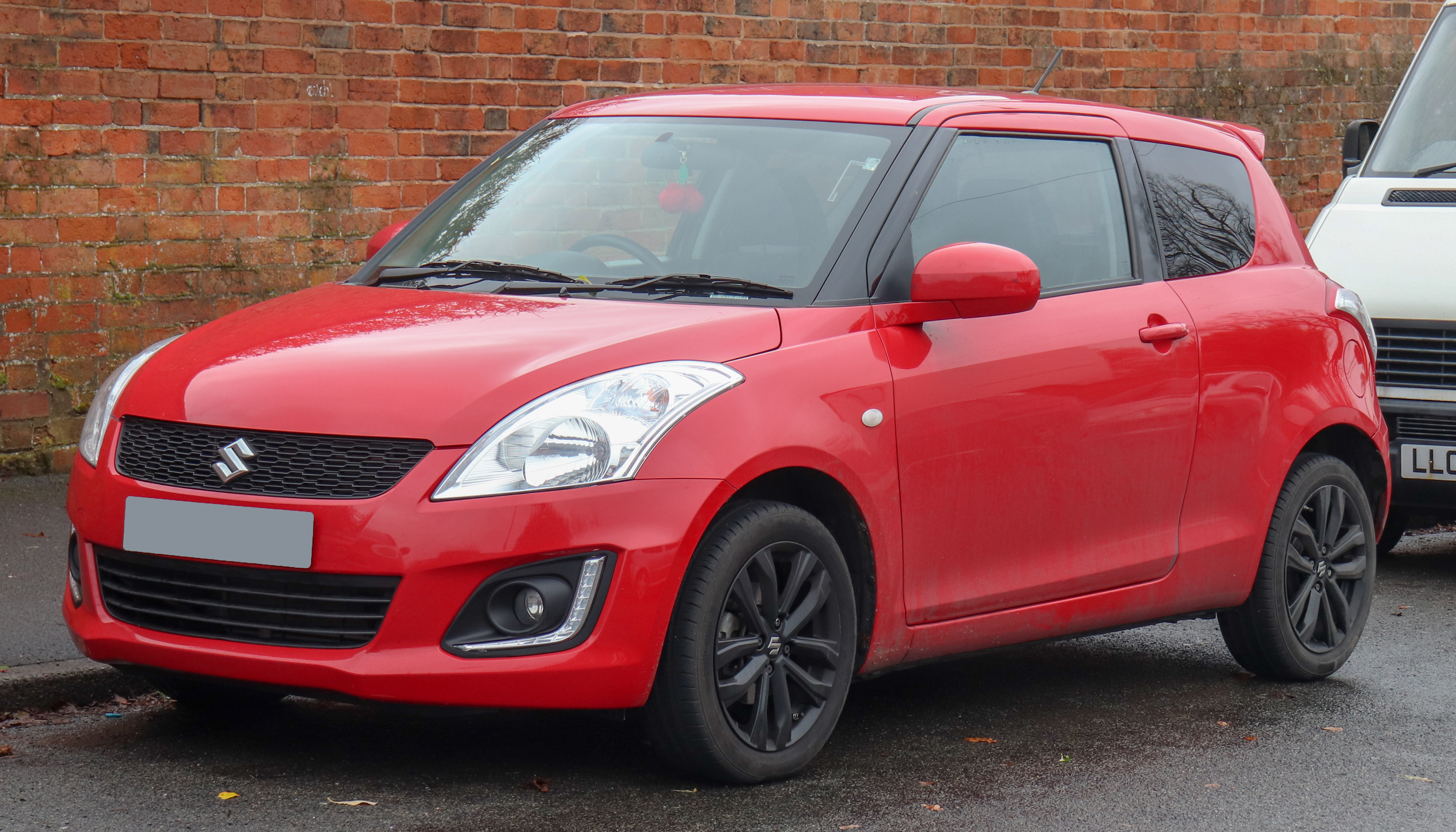
2013 facelift model (UK)

=== Swift Sport (AZG416/ZC32S) ===
The Swift Sport was previewed by the Swift S-Concept which was showcased first at the 2011 Australian International Motor Show. The production model of Swift Sport is powered by a revised 1.6-liter four-cylinder (M16A) from previous generation Swift Sport's engine and producing 100 kW; 134 bhp (136 PS) and 160 N⋅m (118 lb⋅ft). The 2012 model comes with the option of a six-speed manual transmission or a high performance CVT transmission with seven-speed manual mode and paddle shifters.

Riding on lightweight 17-inch alloys, the car now features a rear spoiler, a large front grille, body kit, new HID headlights and rear lighting clusters. The ground clearance is also lower than the normal version. Inside, designers included leather bucket seats with sporty red stitching and a "Sport" mark, a new steering wheel, and different instrumentation.

In January 2014, The Swift Sport was updated to include a 6.1 inch combined satnav/dab radio infotainment touchscreen as standard.

In the United Kingdom, Suzuki has released another special edition of the Swift, the SZ-R, limited to just 100 units. In August 2014, Suzuki launched this vehicle for Brazilian market simply as Swift Sport R. It has higher engine output, producing a claimed output of 104 kW; 140 bhp (142 PS).

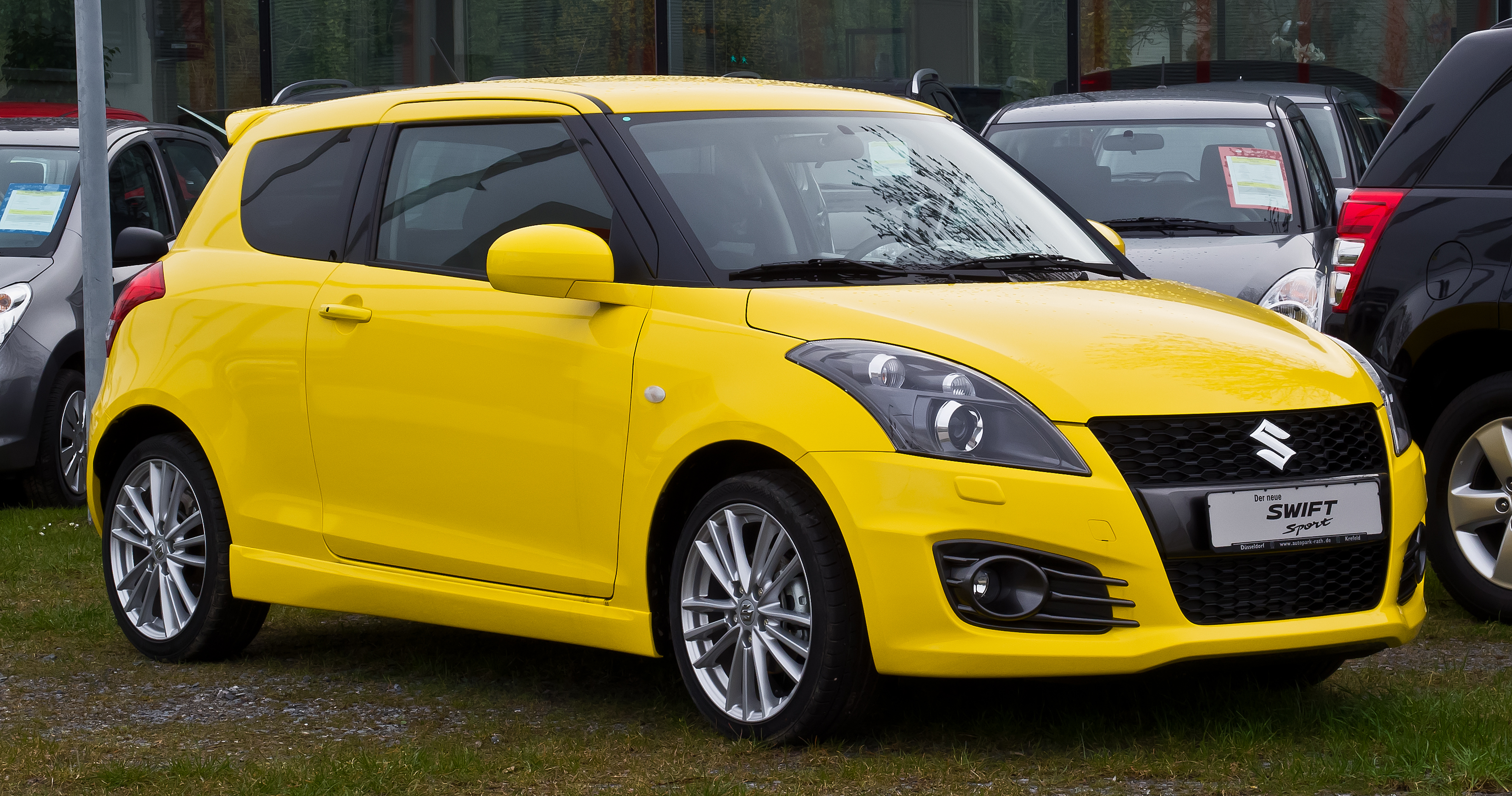
Suzuki Swift Sport 3-door (Germany)

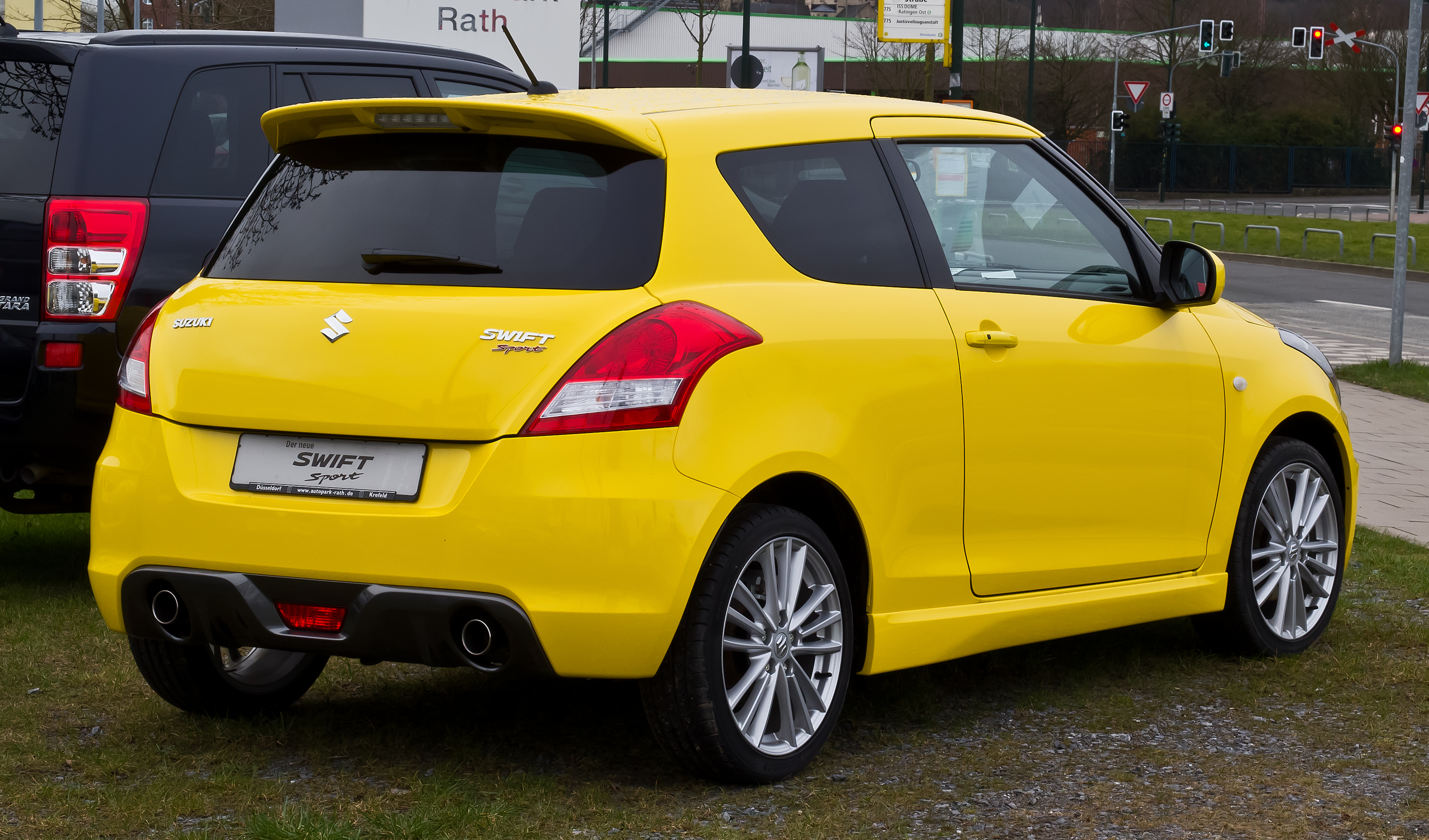
Suzuki Swift Sport 3-door (Germany)

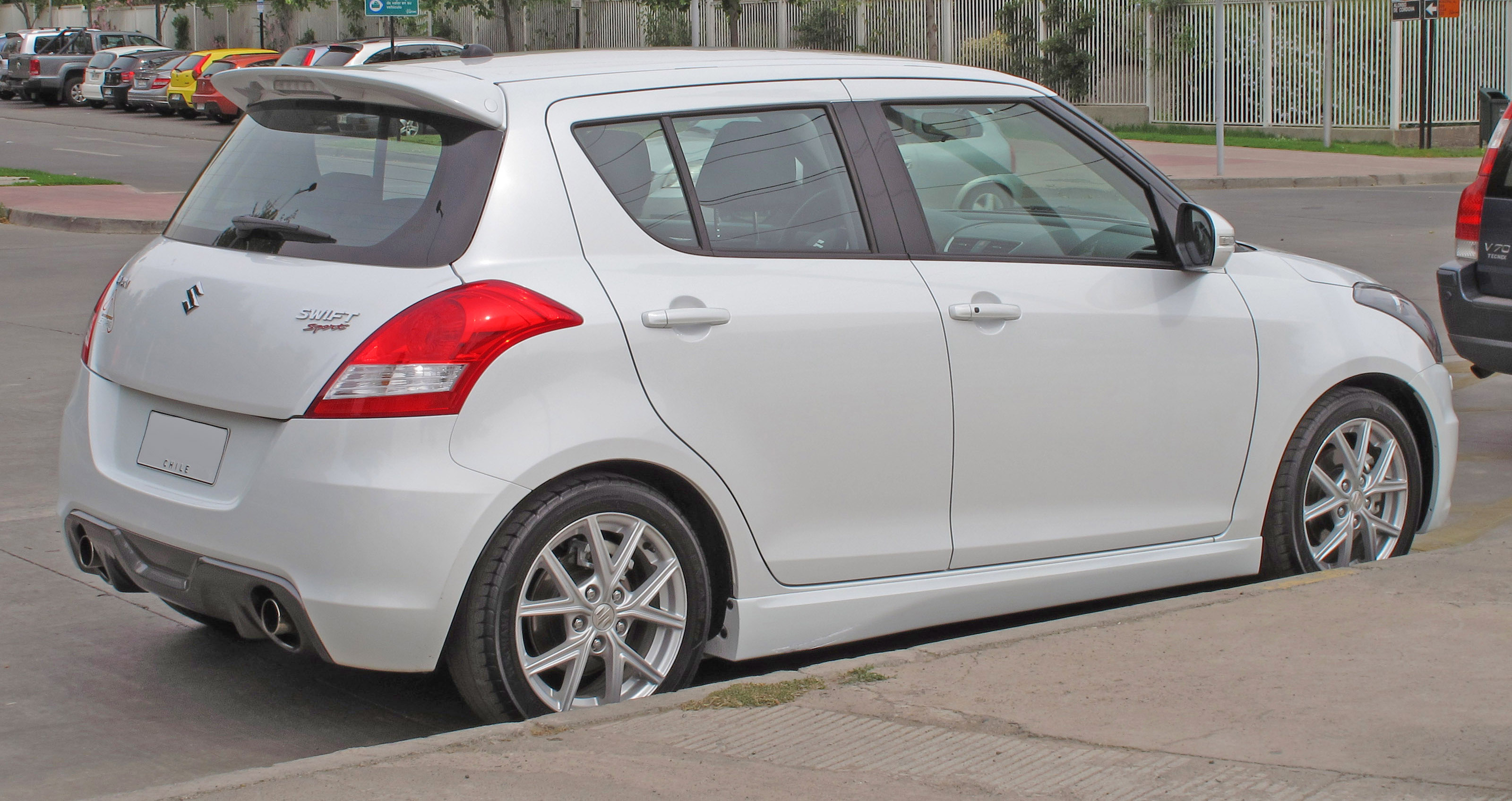
Suzuki Swift Sport 5-door (Chile)

=== Safety ===
- Euro NCAP (2010) –

ANCAP test results* Suzuki Swift (2011)
Test	Score
Overall	5 /5 stars
Frontal offset	15.68/16
Side impact	15.88/16
Pole	2/2
Seat belt reminders	2/3
Whiplash protection	Good
Pedestrian protection	Adequate
Electronic stability control	Standard

ASEAN NCAP test results Suzuki Swift (2013)
Test	Points	Stars
Adult occupant:	13.32	4 /5 stars
Child occupant:	77%	0 /5 stars
Safety assist:	NA	

Global NCAP 1.0 test results (India) Maruti Suzuki Swift – No Airbags (2014, similar to Latin NCAP 2013)
Test	Score	Stars
Adult occupant protection	0.00/17.00	0 /5 stars
Child occupant protection	7.94/49.00	1 /5 stars

Latin NCAP 1.5 test results Suzuki Swift - 2 Airbags (2014, similar to Euro NCAP 2002)
Test	Points	Stars
Adult occupant:	10.12/17.0	3 /5 stars
Child occupant:	3.41/49.00	1 /5 stars

== Third generation (A2L; 2016) ==
Third generation
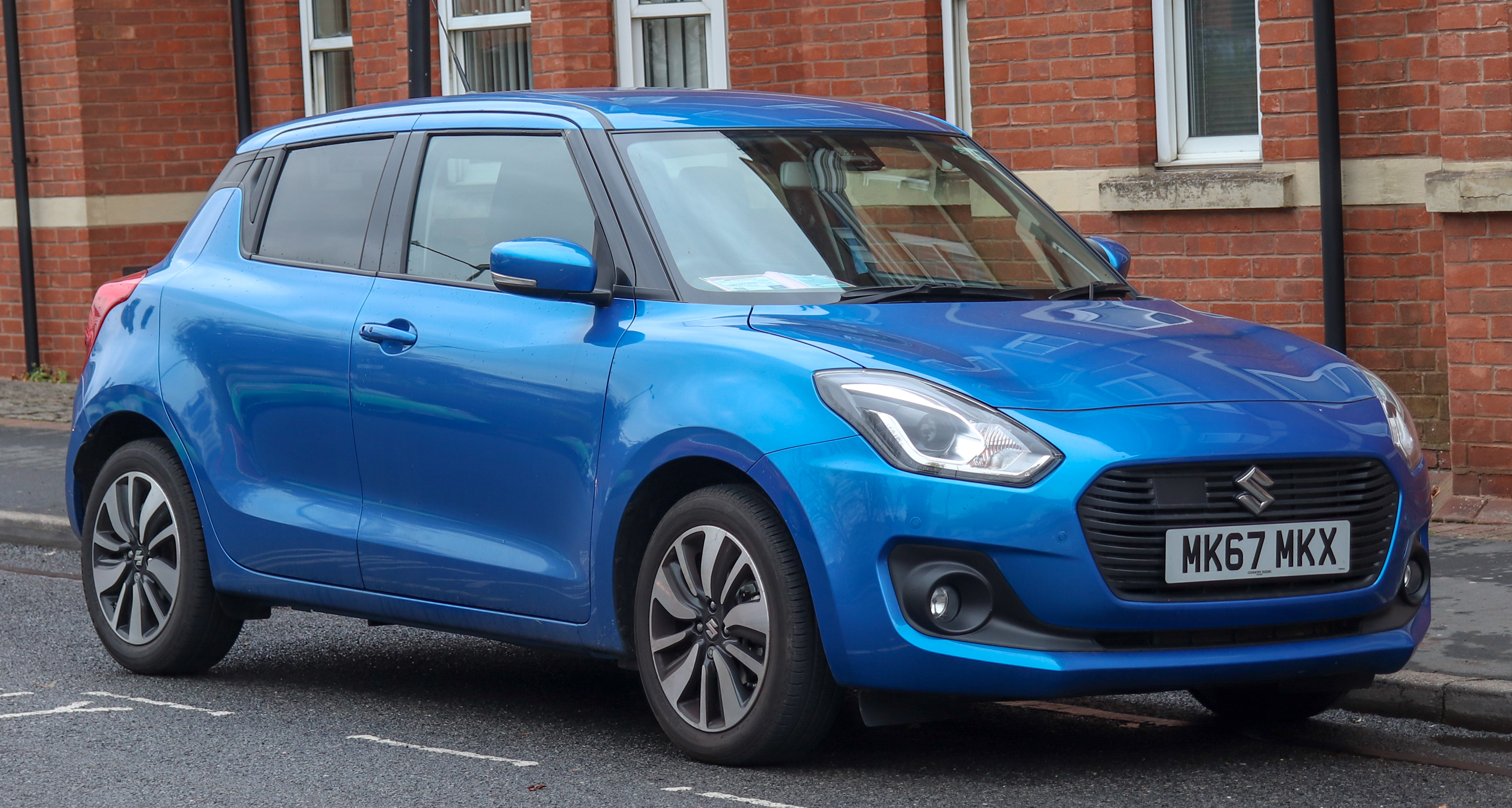
- Pre-facelift Suzuki Swift with slant grille (UK)

Overview
- Model code: A2L
- Production: December 2016 – November 2023 (Japan); 2017–2024 (India/Thailand); 2018–present (Myanmar/Vietnam); 2022–present (Pakistan); 2023–present (Ghana)
- Model years: 2017–2024
- Assembly: Japan: Makinohara (Sagara Assembly Plant); India: Ahmedabad (Suzuki Motor Gujarat); Thailand: Rayong (Suzuki Motor Thailand); Myanmar: Thilawa (Suzuki Thilawa Motor); Pakistan: Karachi (Pak Suzuki Motors); Ghana: Accra (Toyota Tsusho Manufacturing Ghana); Vietnam: Biên Hòa (Vietnam Suzuki Corp.)
- Designer: Kimitoshi Sato and Toshiyuki Koike

Body and chassis
- Platform: Heartect B platform
- Related: Suzuki Dzire; Suzuki Baleno; Suzuki Ignis; Suzuki Xbee; Suzuki Solio

Powertrain
- Engine: Gasoline: 1.0 L K10C Boosterjet I3-T (ZC13S); 1.2 L K12M I4 (ZC63S); 1.2 L K12N Dualjet I4; 1.25 L K12C Dualjet I4 (ZC/ZD83S); 1.4 L K14C Boosterjet I4-T (ZC33S); Gasoline hybrid: 1.0 L K10C Boosterjet I3-T MHEV (ZC23S); 1.2 L K12D Dualjet I4 MHEV; 1.25 L K12C Dualjet I4-MHEV (ZC/ZD53S); 1.25 L K12C Dualjet I4-FHEV (ZC43S); 1.4 L K14D Boosterjet I4-T MHEV; Diesel: 1.3 L D13A DDiS I4-TD
- Electric motor: MHEV: DC synchronous Integrated Starter Generator (ISG): WA05A; WA05B; WA06B; FHEV: AC synchronous Motor Generator Unit (MGU): PB05A
- Transmission: 5-speed Aisin manual; 5-speed Aisin-Magneti Marelli AMT "AGS"; 6-speed Aisin manual; 6-speed Aisin automatic; Jatco CVT
- Hybrid drivetrain: 12 or 48-volt mild hybrid (Boosterjet SHVS, Boostergreen, Dualjet SHVS); 48-volt Parallel Hybrid (Dualjet Hybrid)
- Battery: 3 or 10 Ah lithium-ion (MHEV); 4.4 Ah lithium-ion (FHEV)

Dimensions
- Wheelbase: 2,450 mm (96 in)
- Length: 3,840–3,855 mm (151.2–151.8 in); 3,890 mm (153.1 in) (Sport)
- Width: 1,695 mm (66.7 in) (Japan); 1,735 mm (68.3 in)
- Height: 1,495–1,500 mm (58.9–59.1 in) (FWD/Sport); 1,520–1,525 mm (59.8–60.0 in) (AWD)
- Curb weight: 840–1,000 kg (1,851.9–2,204.6 lb) (FWD); 975–1,025 kg (2,149.5–2,259.7 lb) (AWD); 965–1,025 kg (2,127.5–2,259.7 lb) (Sport)

The third generation Swift debuted in Japan on 27 December 2016. The hatchback is built on the HEARTECT platform which made its debut in 2015 and is the same lightweight platform used for the production of the hatchbacks Baleno and Ignis. This new lightweight platform made the third generation Swift roughly 10% lighter than the previous generation. Only 5-door body style is available, even though the car looks like a 3-door because the rear door handles are moved to the C-pillar. Despite having similar size as the previous generation (10 mm shorter, 10 mm lower, 40 mm wider and 20 mm longer wheelbase), the boot space is also roughly 20% more spacious (now 246 liters, up to 579 liters when the rear seats are folded), but still smaller than its competitors.

This generation is also the first that uses the newly developed Boosterjet direct injection turbocharged gasoline engines and Smart Hybrid Vehicle by Suzuki (SHVS) mild hybrid technologies. The compact and lightweight 12 or 48-volt mild hybrid system features a belt-driven Integrated Starter Generator (ISG), which assists the engine during acceleration and helps recoup energy via regenerative braking. In Japan, a 48-volt full hybrid model is available for the 1.25-liter four-cylinder gasoline engine, it is connected to a Motor Generator Unit (MGU) and 5-speed clutchless automated manual transmission (AGS).

Additional safety kits are also updated, such as; a forward-facing camera and laser sensors that deliver lane departure warning and high-beam assist, along with autonomous emergency braking.

The European market Swift is no longer built by Magyar Suzuki in Hungary, it is now supplied from Japan and also exported to areas including Asia, Oceania and Latin America. It is also manufactured in India, Thailand and Myanmar. The Indian-built Swift is exported to Africa, parts of Asia, and some Latin American and Middle Eastern markets. The third generation Swift is also manufactured in Pakistan and Ghana since 2022 and 2023, respectively.

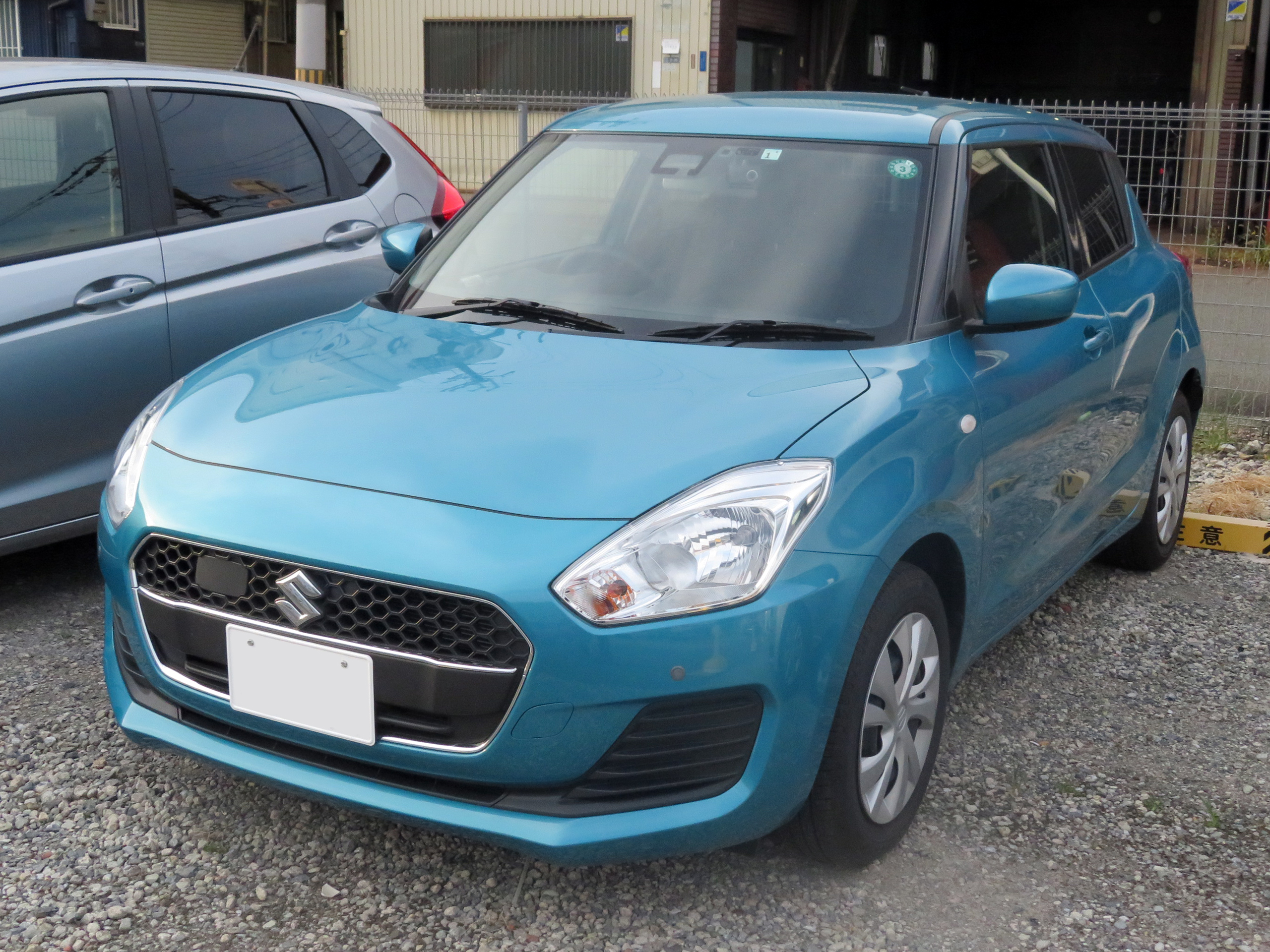
Pre-facelift Suzuki Swift with mesh grille (Japan)

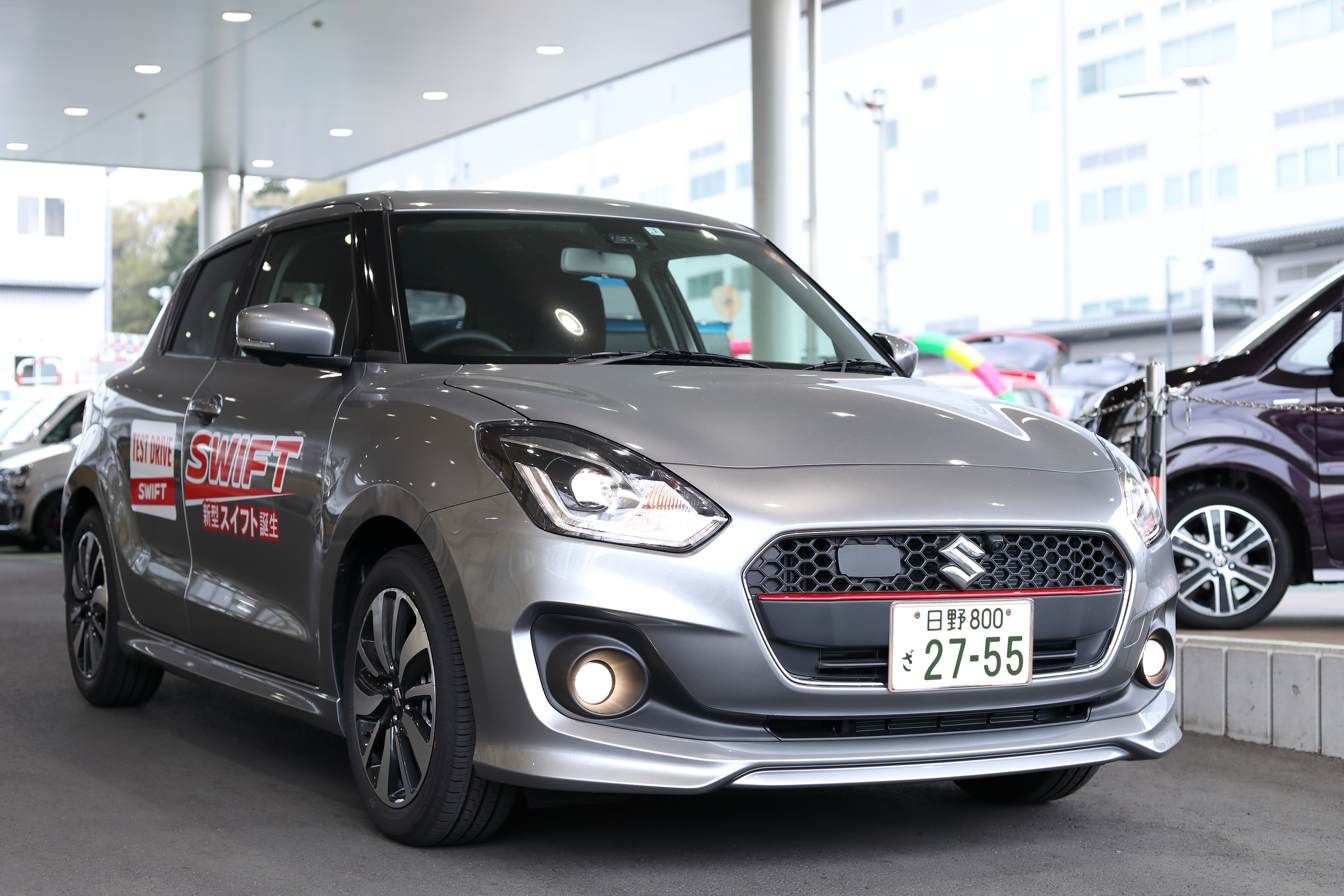
Pre-facelift Suzuki Swift RS (Japan)

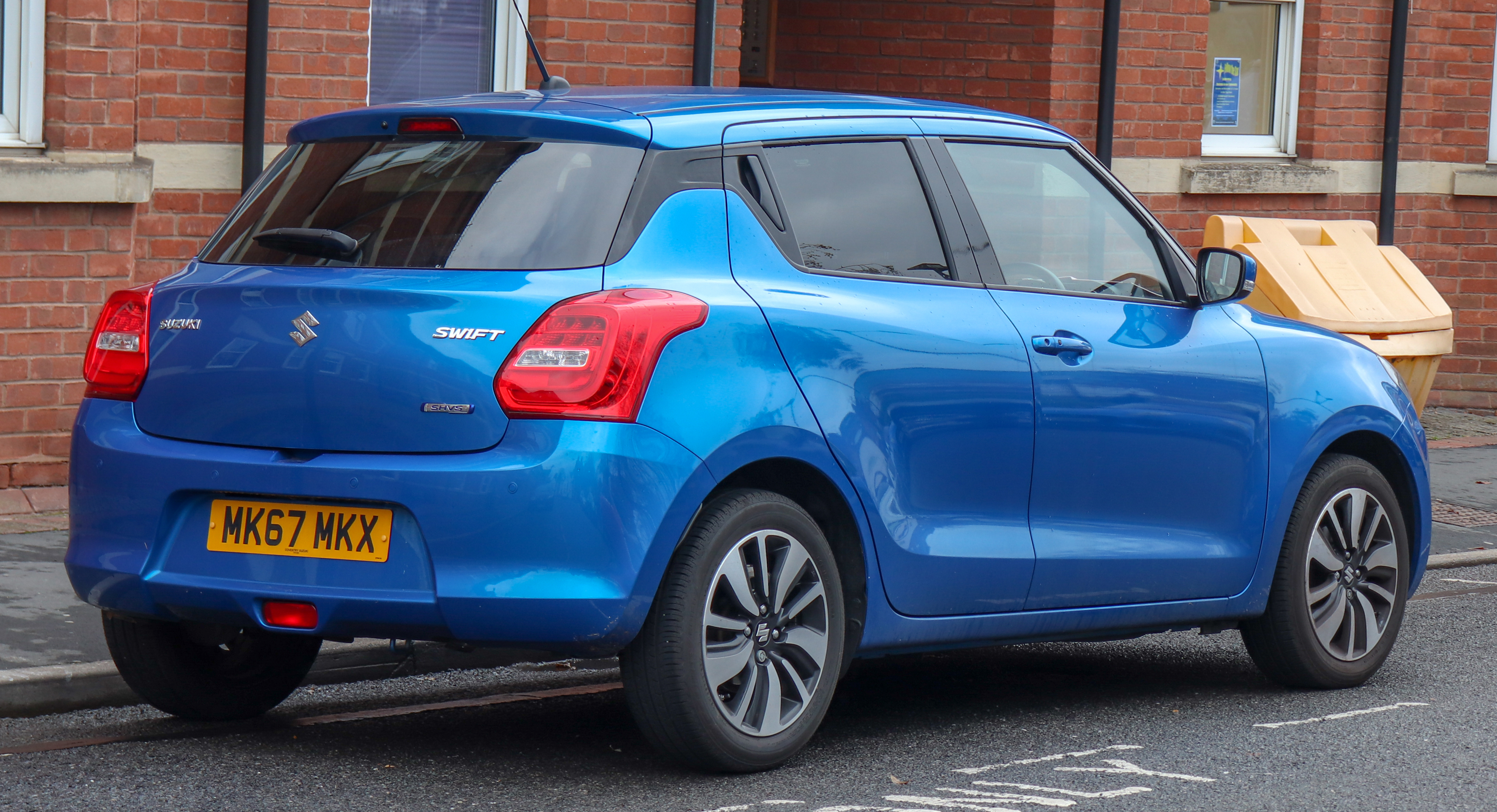
Rear view of Suzuki Swift (UK)

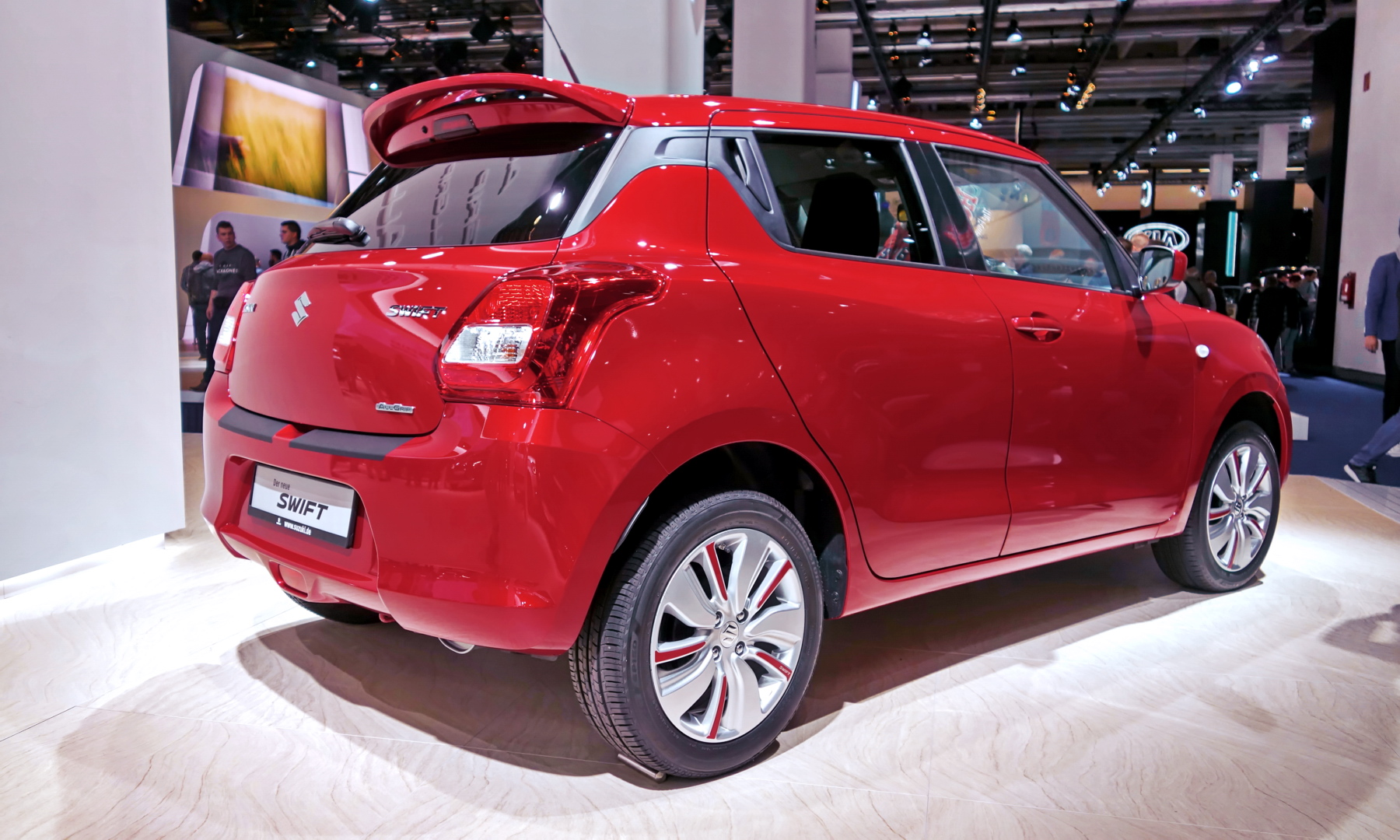
Rear view of Suzuki Swift (base model, Germany)

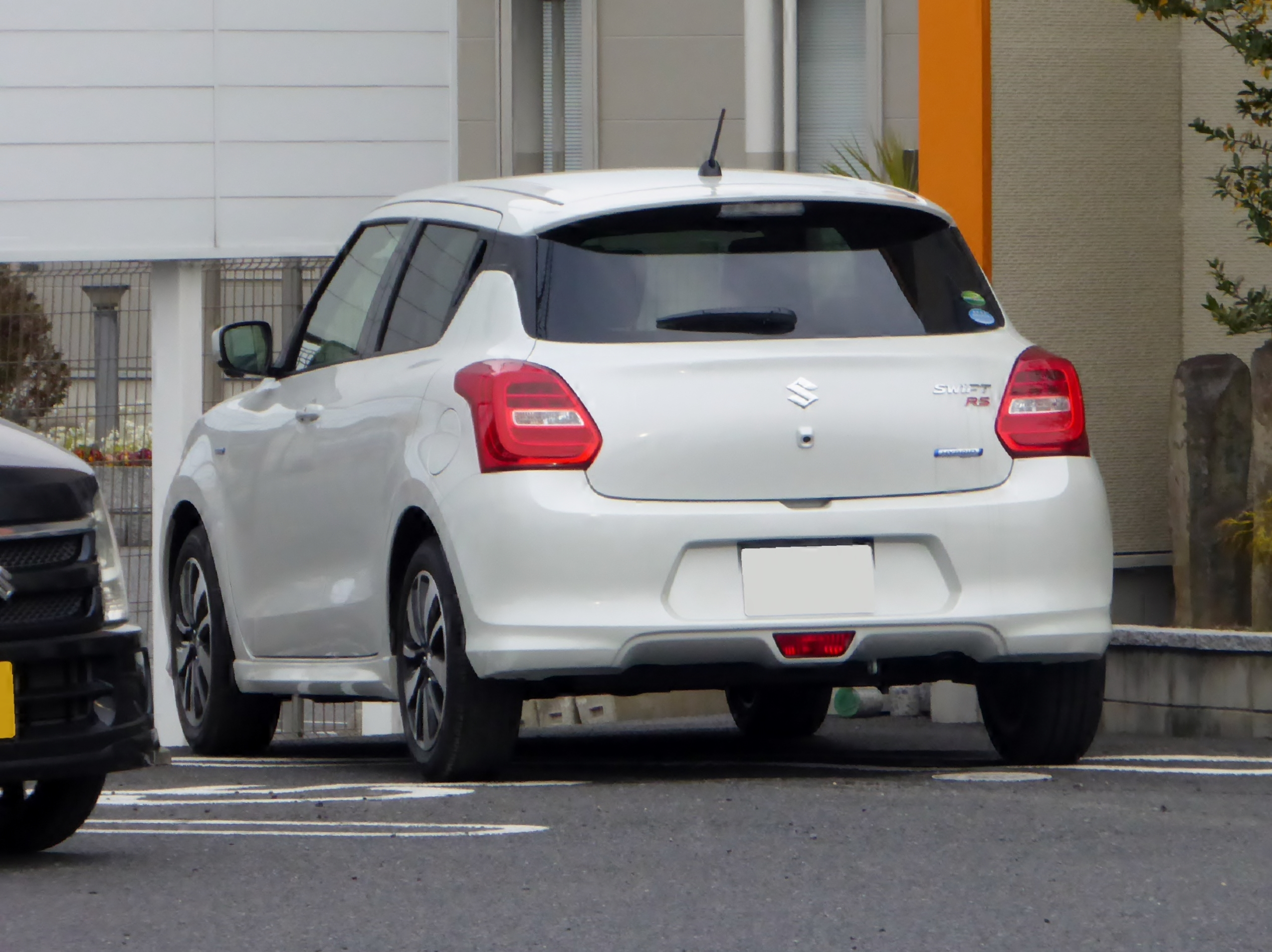
Rear view of Suzuki Swift RS (Japan)

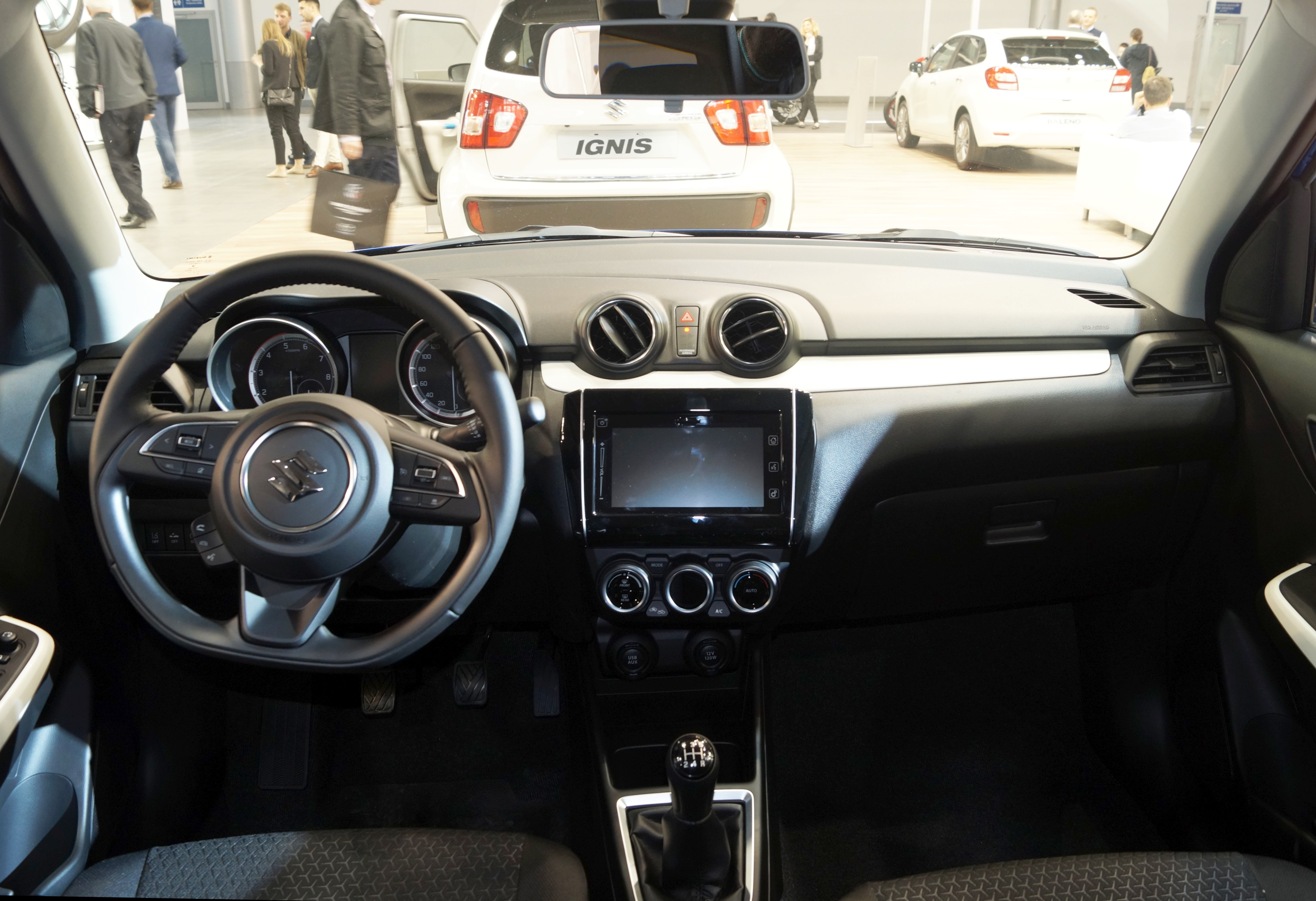
Interior

=== Facelift ===
The Suzuki Swift received a minor facelift in May 2020 for the Japanese market. European market received the facelifted model in September 2020. It was also released in November 2020 for the Mexican market, in February 2021 for the Thai and Indian market, and in the Philippine market in March 2022.

The hatchback received new radiator grille, alloy wheels and dual-tone color option. Some features from the higher trim now become available for lower trims, some markets also received new features from other markets which was standard in the pre-facelift model. The engine is also revised for markets with stricter emission standards (see below). The 12-volt mild hybrid system has also been upgraded with a bigger 10Ah battery, replacing the old 3Ah unit to boost energy recovery.

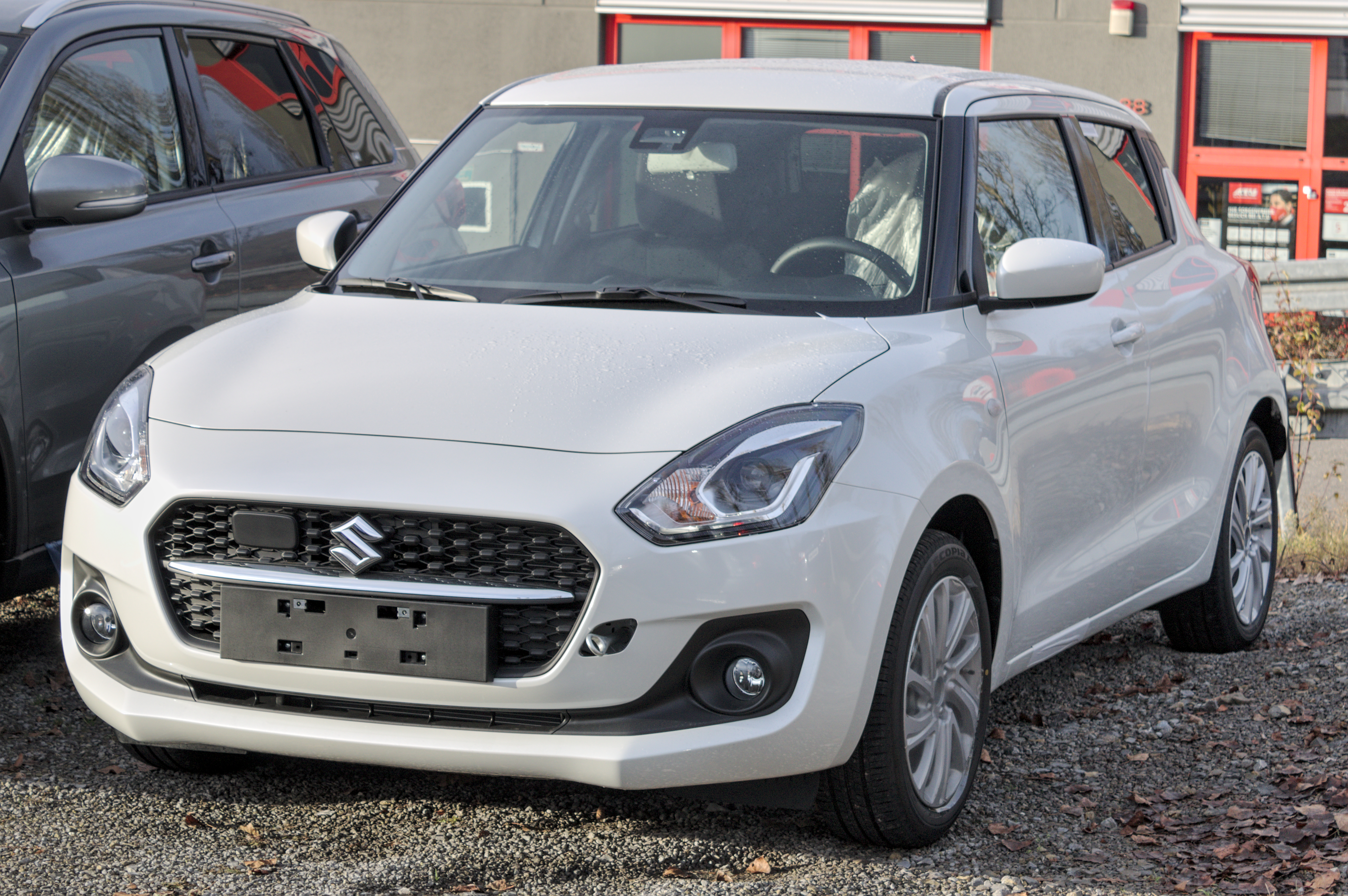
Facelifted regular Suzuki Swift (Germany)

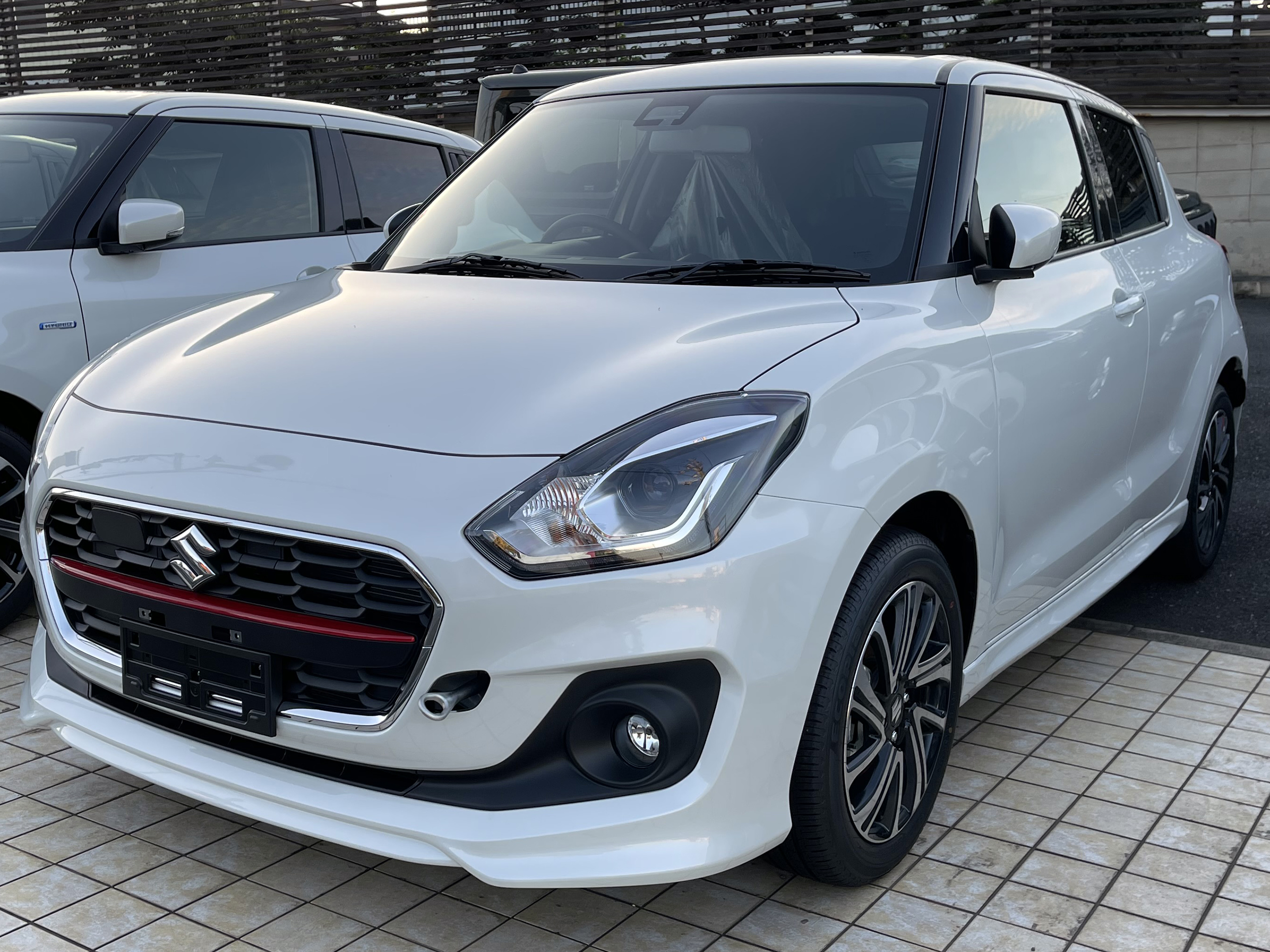
Facelifted Suzuki Swift RS (Japan)

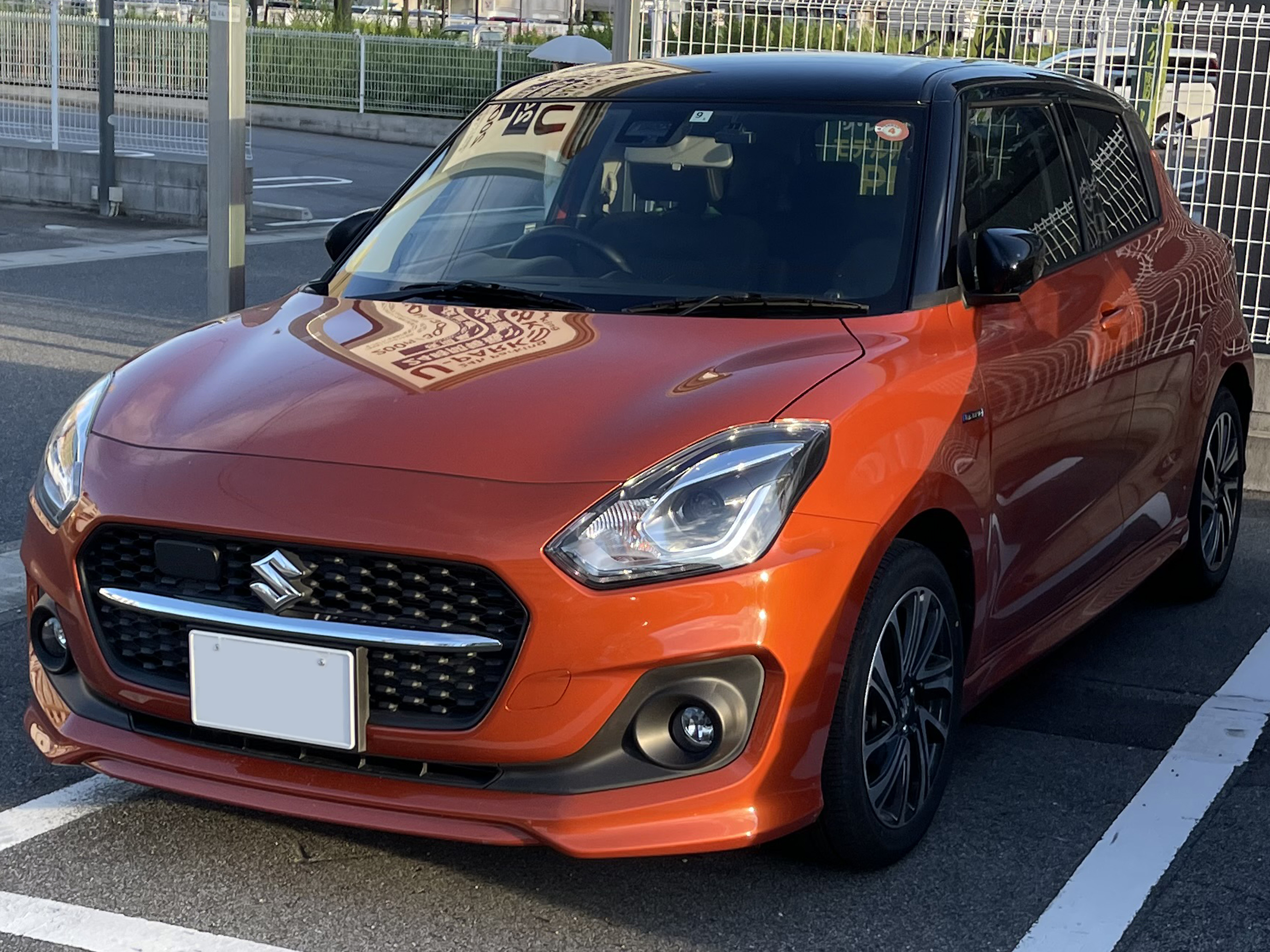
Facelifted Suzuki Swift Hybrid received RS bumpers (Japan)

=== Swift Sport (ZC33S / A2L414) ===
Suzuki officially unveiled the ZC33S Swift Sport at the 2017 Frankfurt Motor Show. The car comes with a 1.4-liter turbocharged K14C Boosterjet engine shared with the Vitara S. The engine makes 103 kW; 138 bhp (140 PS) DIN at 5,500 rpm and 230 N⋅m (170 lb⋅ft) of torque at 2,500–3,000 rpm. It comes equipped with either a 6-speed manual or a 6-speed automatic transmission. Aesthetically, the Swift Sport has a completely new front and rear bumpers, a rear spoiler, 16 or 17-inch alloy wheels, dual exhaust, wider tyres, a front chin spoiler and a red accented interior.

In June 2020, Suzuki launched the A2L414 Swift Sport with Suzuki's SHVS 48-volt mild hybrid technology for European market to meet Euro 6d emission standard. Still with the 1.4-liter turbocharged engine (now called K14D Boosterjet), revised with dual VVT and a smaller turbocharger. It now makes 95 kW; 127 bhp (129 PS) at 5,500 rpm and 235 N⋅m (173 lbf⋅ft) of torque at 2,000–3,000 rpm and also 55 kg heavier than the old 6-speed manual non-hybrid model. This version is also available in Singapore, Taiwan, Hong Kong, Macau and Malaysia. The Sport version did not receive any facelift like the regular Swift, except the additional dual tone color option.

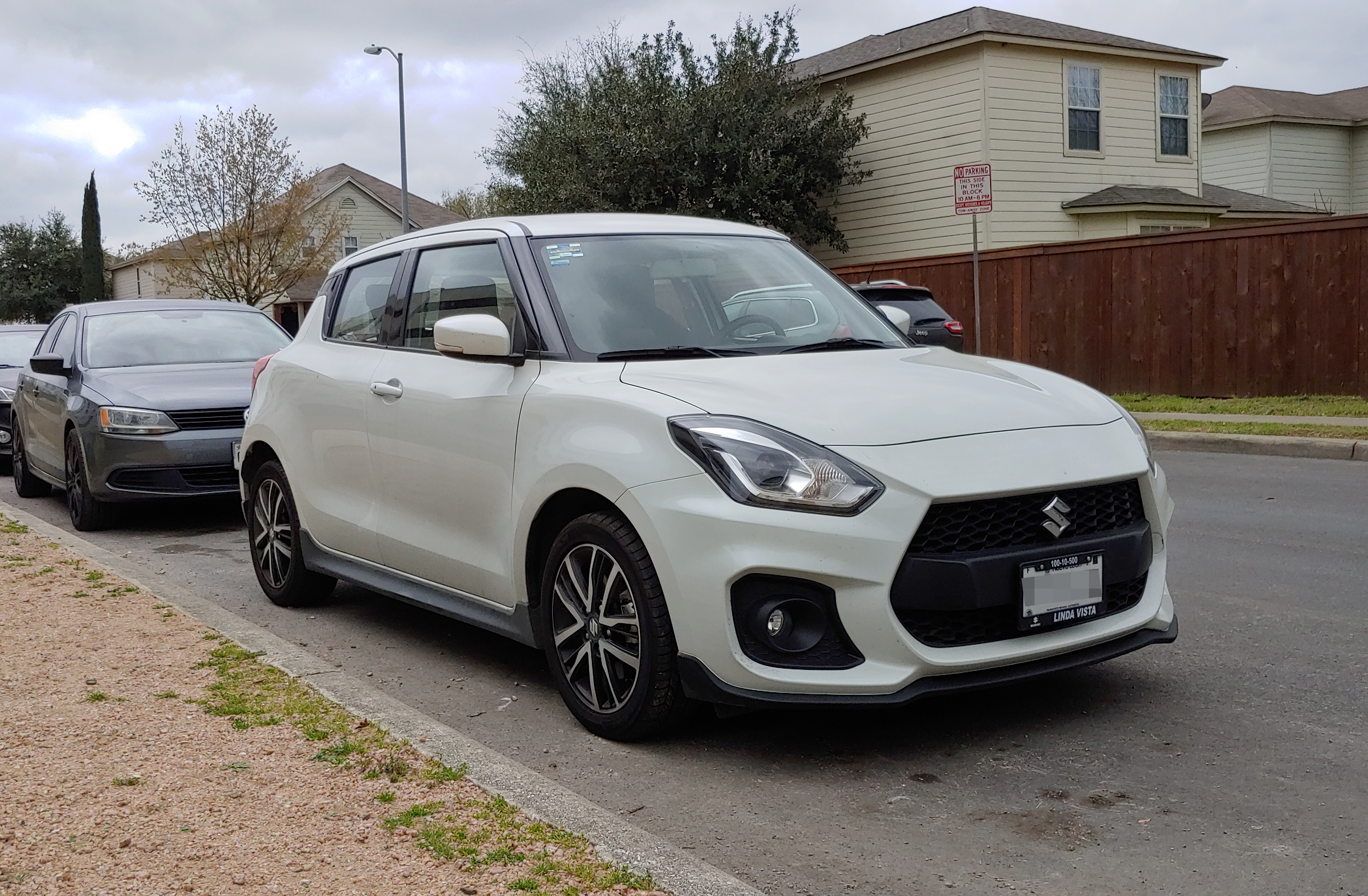
Suzuki Swift Sport (Mexico)

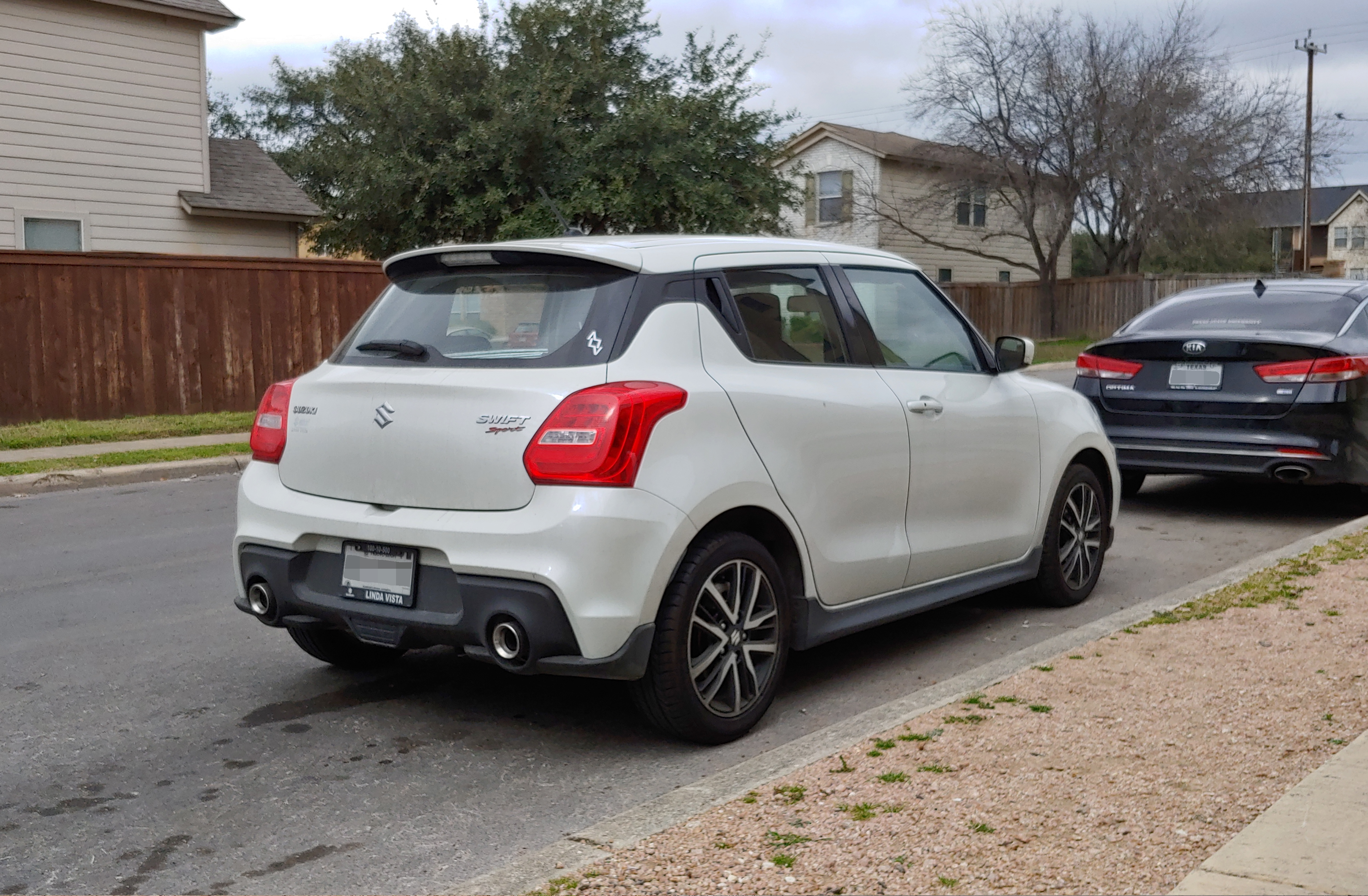
Suzuki Swift Sport Rear (Mexico)

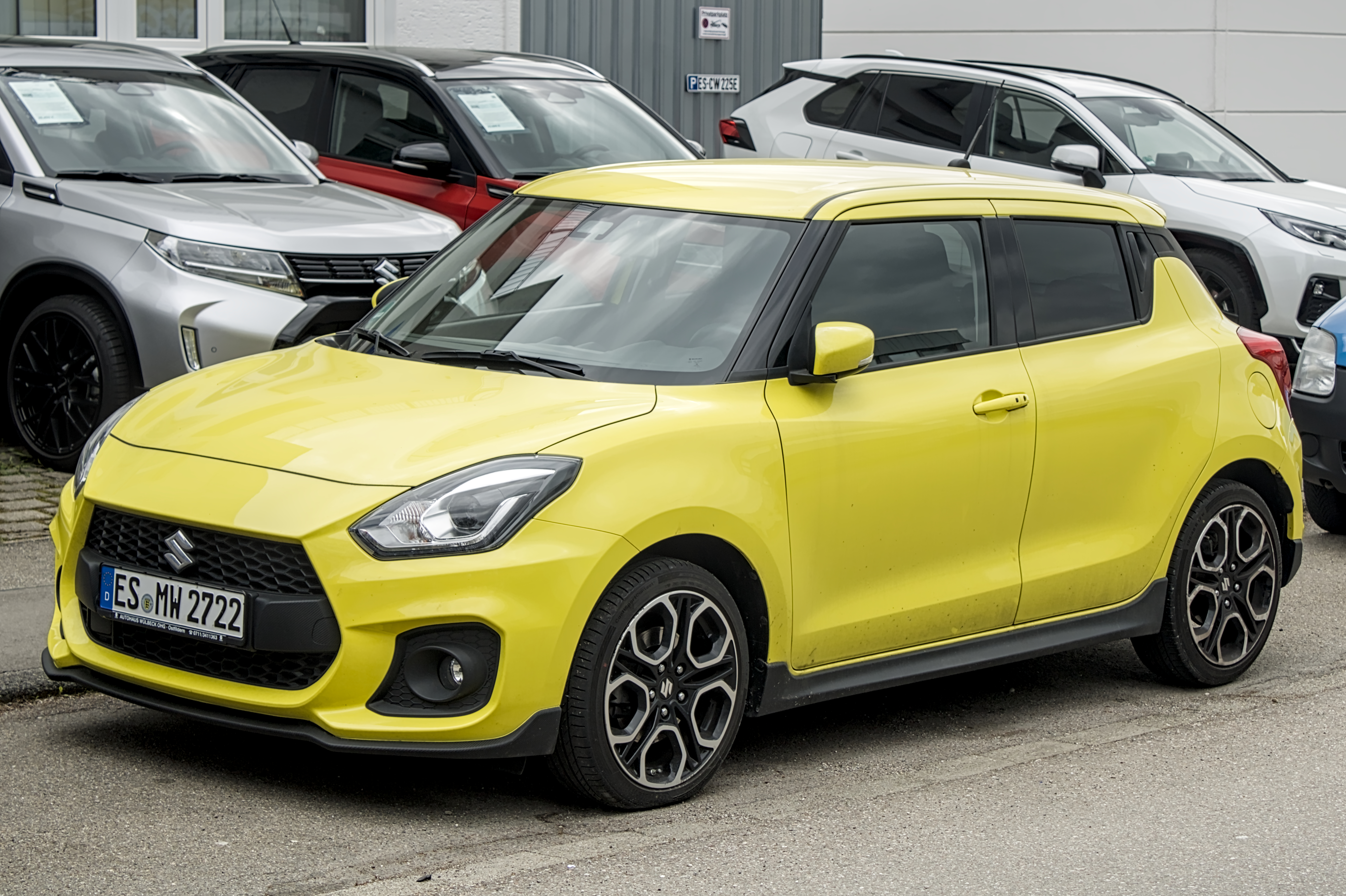
Suzuki Swift Sport Hybrid (Germany)

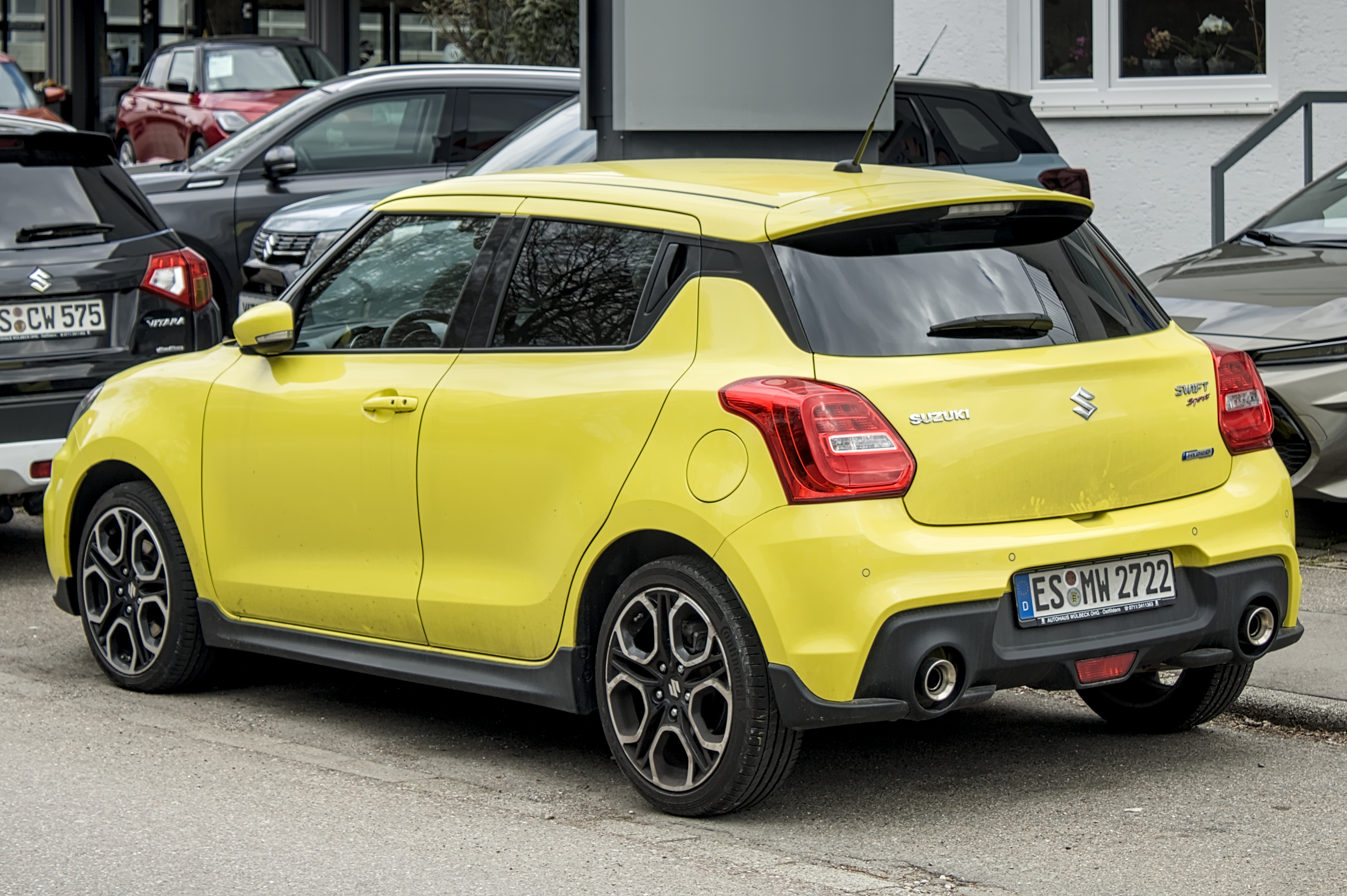
Suzuki Swift Sport Hybrid Rear (Germany)

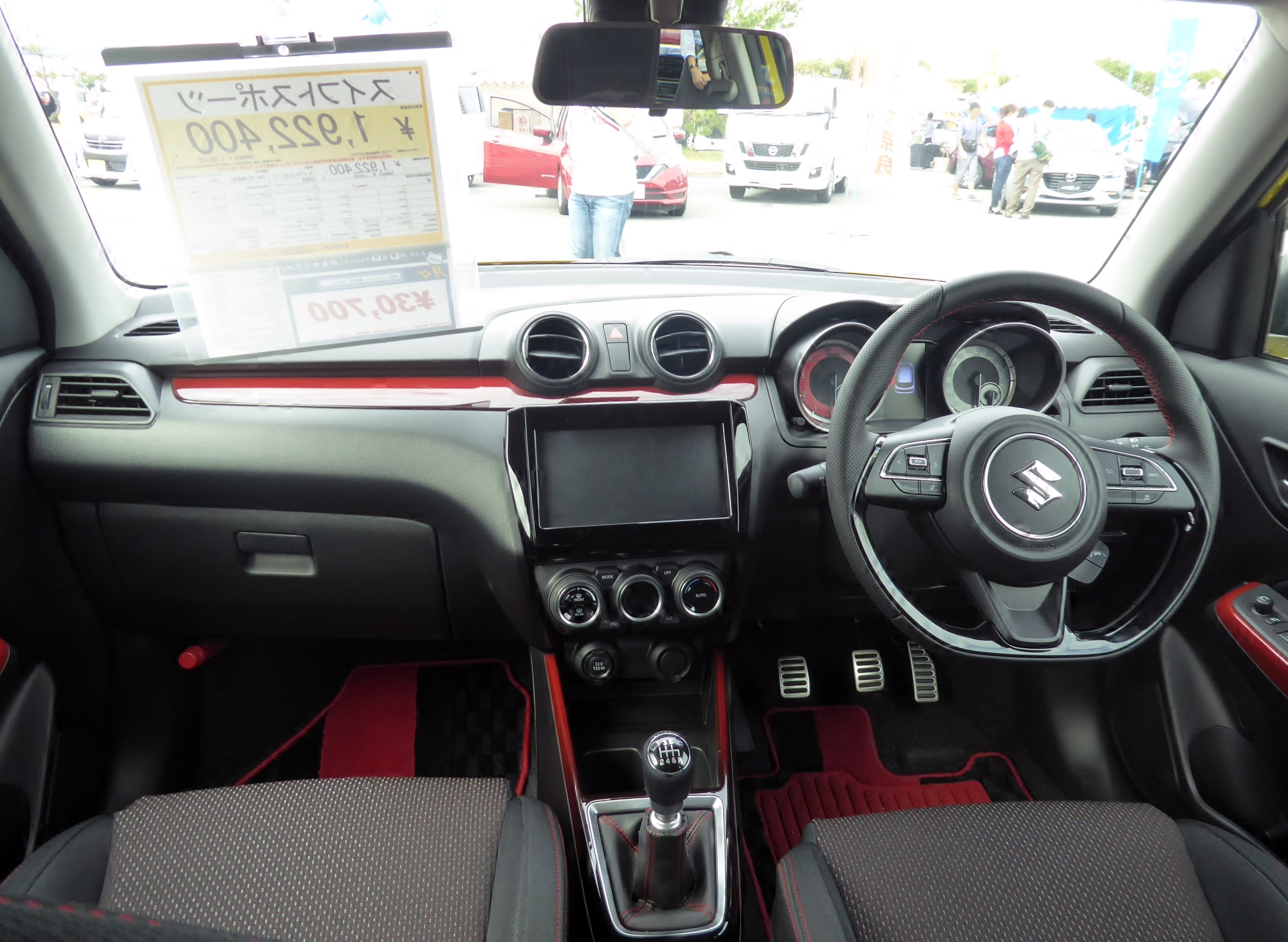
Interior (Japan)

==== Limited editions ====
For the Italian market, a limited edition Swift Sport BeeRacing was launched in March 2018. In June of the same year, 100 units limited edition Swift Sport, called the Red Devil was announced for the Australian market.

In May 2019, a limited edition Swift Sport Katana was launched for Dutch market only. The limited edition hot hatch pays tribute to the new Suzuki Katana 1000 bike. Built in a limited run of only 30 units, it comes in two colors, 15 units Premium Silver Metallic and 15 units Super Black Pearl paints.

Another limited edition for Italian market was launched in February 2021 to celebrate Suzuki MotoGP's 7th world championship title after Joan Mir won the 2020 MotoGP season. Dubbed as the World Champion Edition and only 7 units were available for sale.

Malaysian market received a limited edition called Silver Edition in October 2023. Compared to regular Swift Sport, the hatchback received additional styling upgrades such as exclusive metallic silver body color, red accents, carbon fiber finish and bigger 250 mm (10 in) LCD screen.

In 2019, Japanese tuner Tommykaira launched a tuned car based on the ZC33S Swift Sport called the Tommykaira m14, 12 years after the ZC31S Swift Sport-based S-Ss had been introduced in 2007. It was available in three packages; Stage I, Stage II and Stage III.

=== Special and limited editions ===
Similar special or limited editions of Swift with Japanese market honeycomb grille, front and rear spoiler, sidekirts, decals (depending on the markets) and additional accessories were launched in India, Philippines, South Africa, Australia, United Kingdom and several other markets.

A special edition based on XG trim called XR Limited was launched for Japanese market in October 2018. The car received sporty exterior package from RS trim, additional "Suzuki Safety Support" safety kits and several comfort features from higher trim. Another limited edition based on the updated XG trim was launched in November 2019, called the Hybrid MG Limited. Basically the car has similar package as the previous limited edition but without sporty RS trim bumpers and additional mild hybrid system as standard.

In Thailand, a special edition called Swift GL Max Edition was launched in November 2020. Equipped with black colored body kit, crossover-like flare fenders, shark fin antenna and decorated quad exhaust pipes. Another special edition with different body kit called GL Plus was launched in August 2021, and limited edition with upgraded body kit called GL Plus Limitless Edition was launched in June 2022.

In New Zealand, limited editions called SR, SR2 and SR3 with similar concept as the previous generations Swift were available from 2018 to 2021. The most notable changes were the wider 205/45 sport tires and 17-inch black alloy wheels.

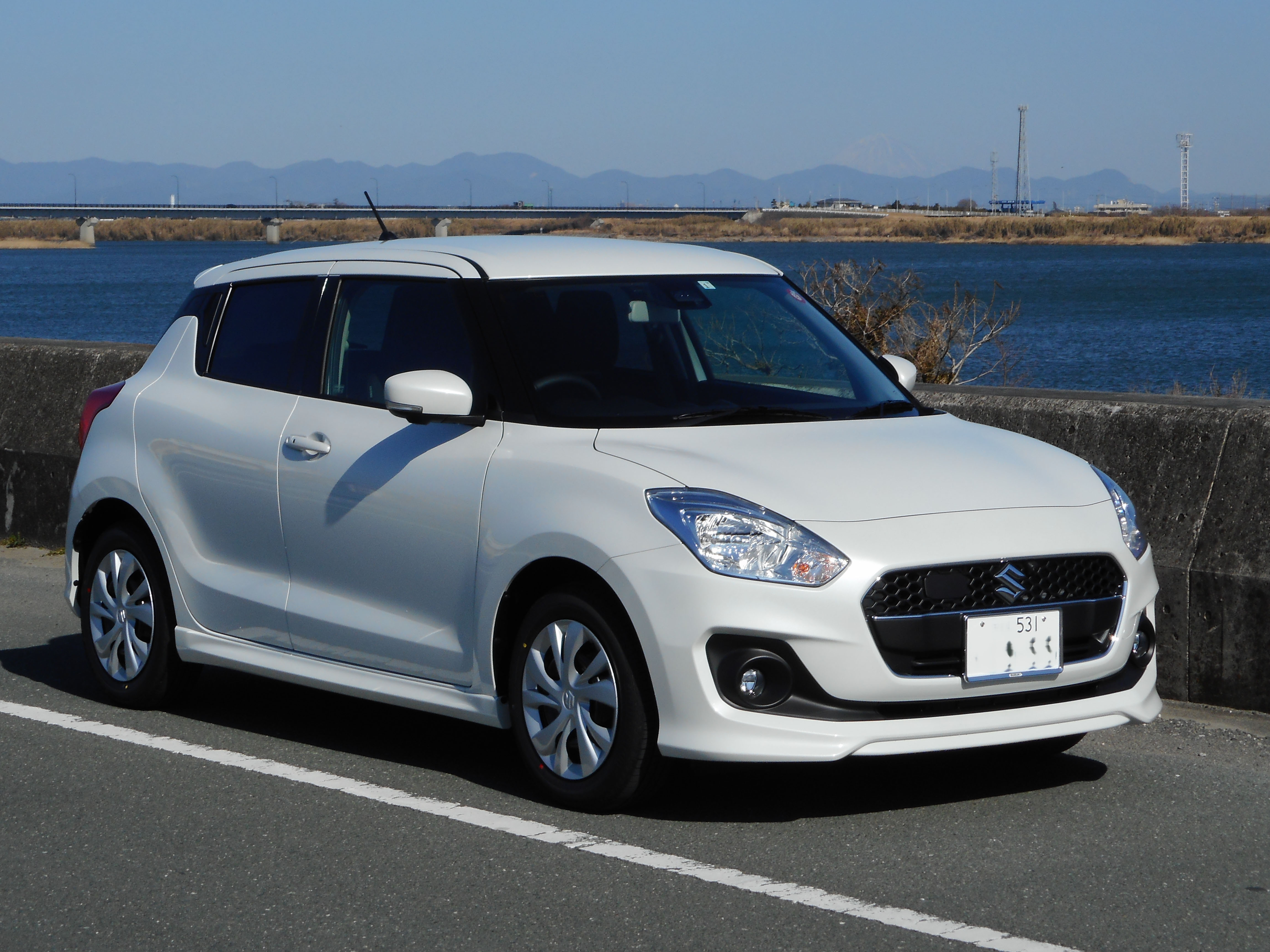
2018 Suzuki Swift XR-Limited (Japan)

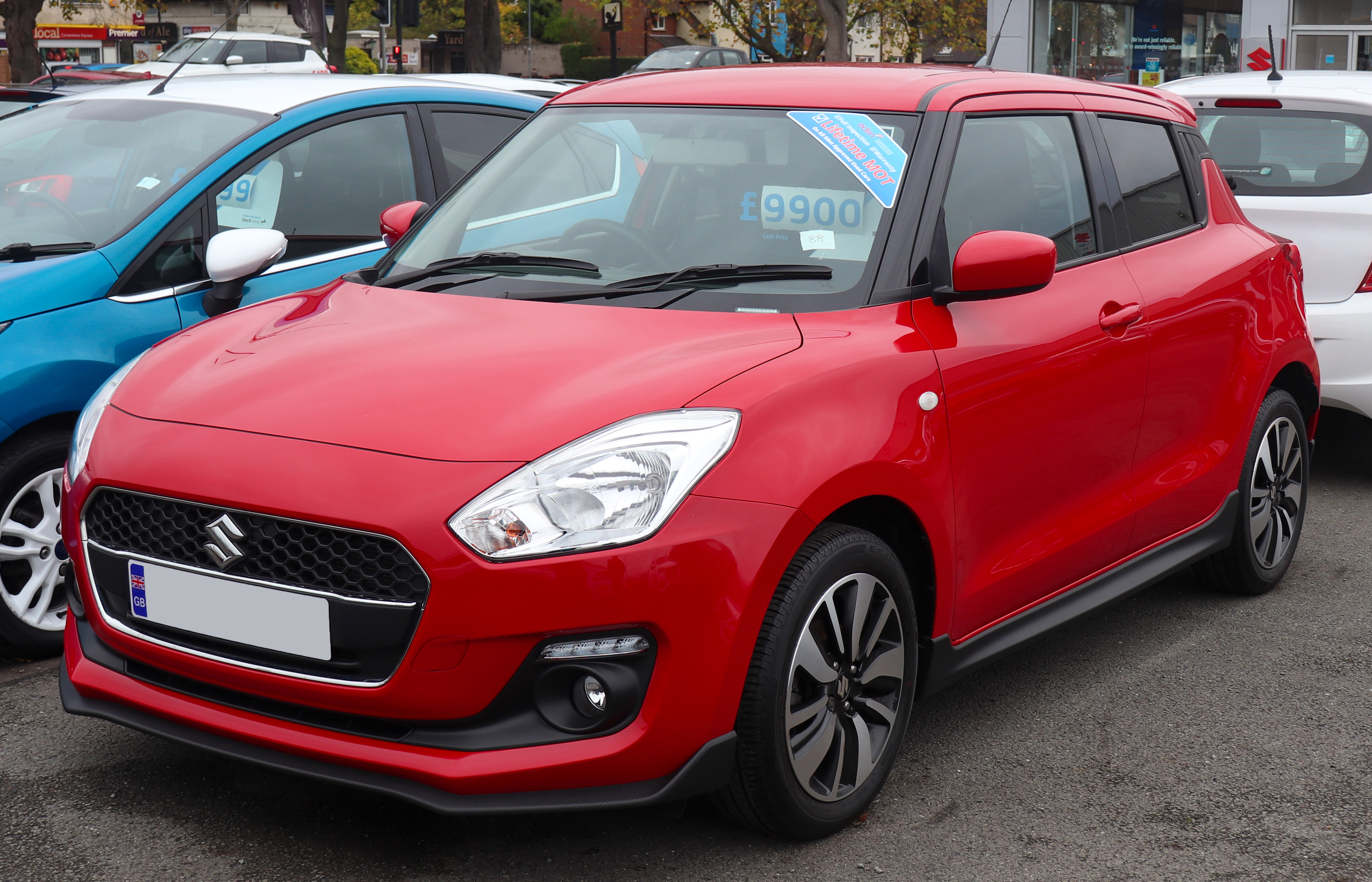
Suzuki Swift Attitude (UK)

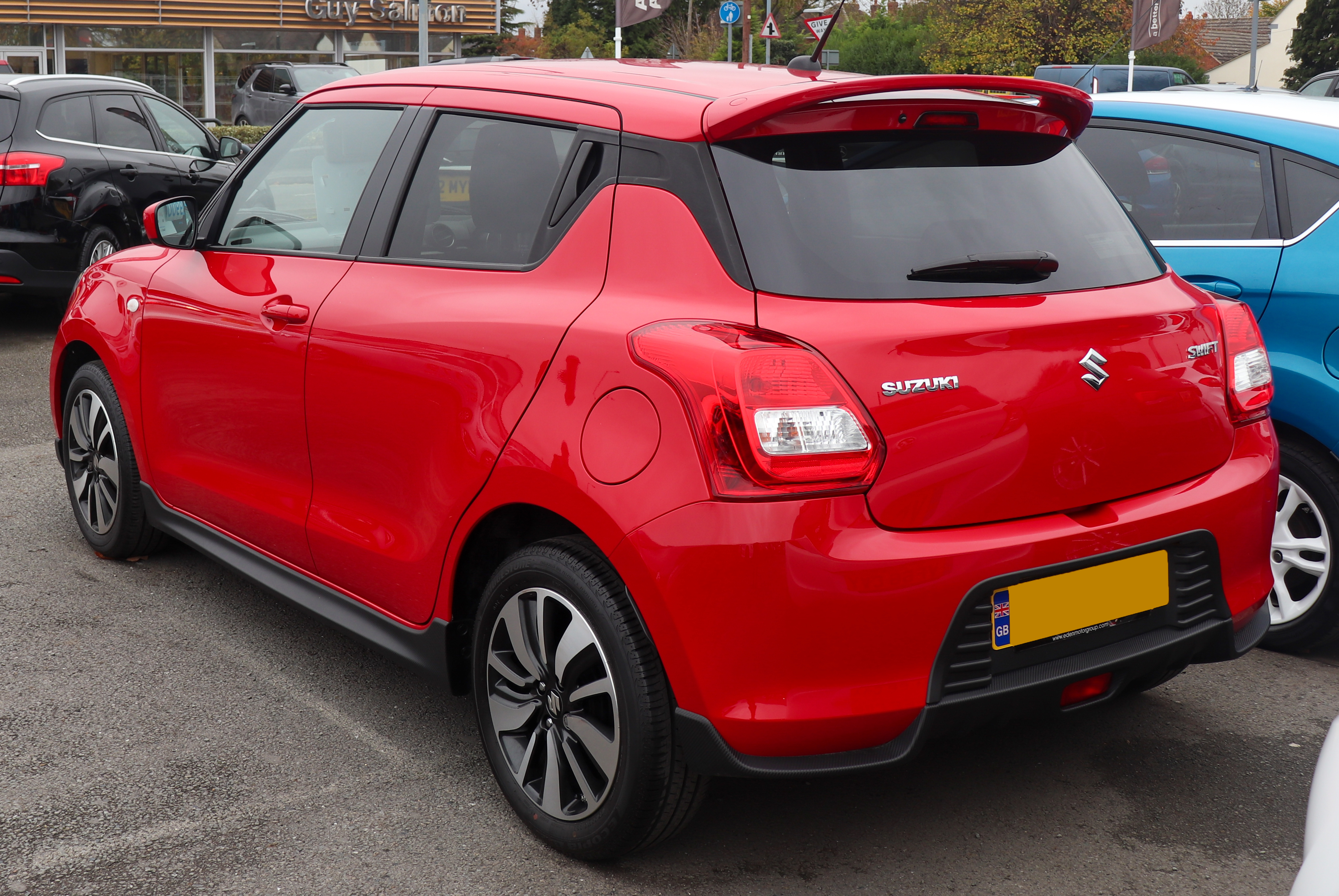
Rear view of Suzuki Swift Attitude (UK)

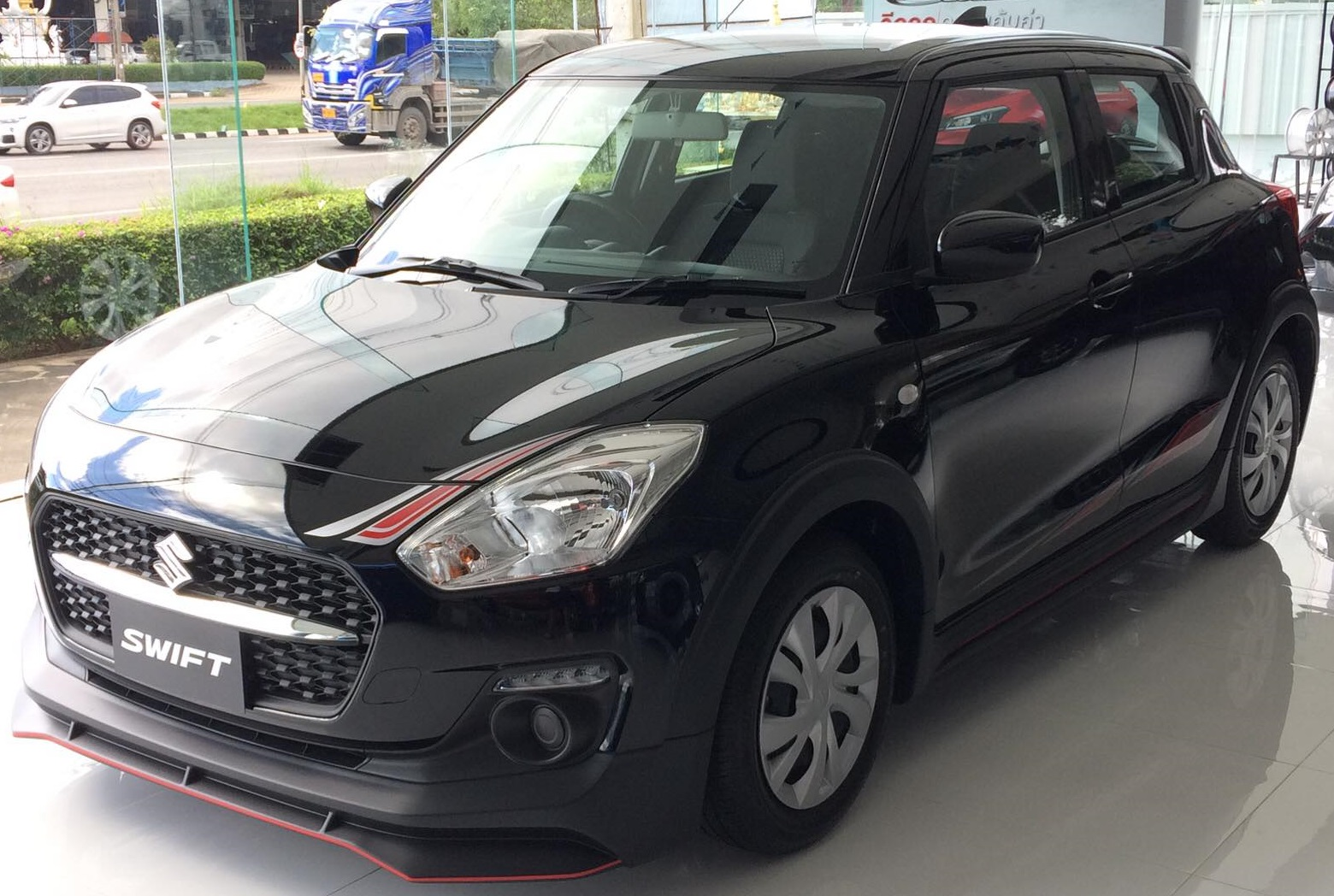
Suzuki Swift GL Plus (Thailand)

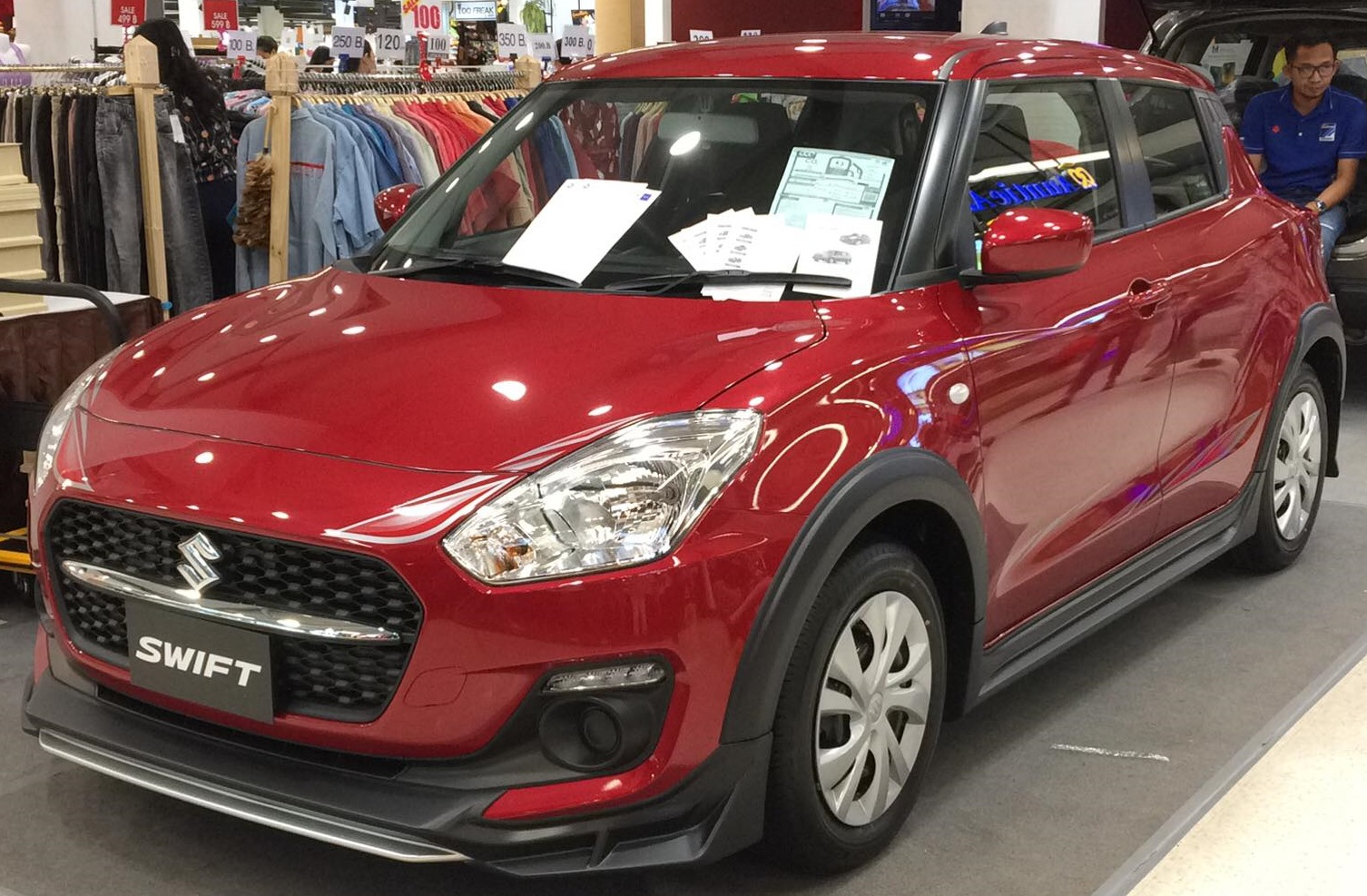
Suzuki Swift GL Plus Limitless Edition (Thailand)

=== Powertrain ===
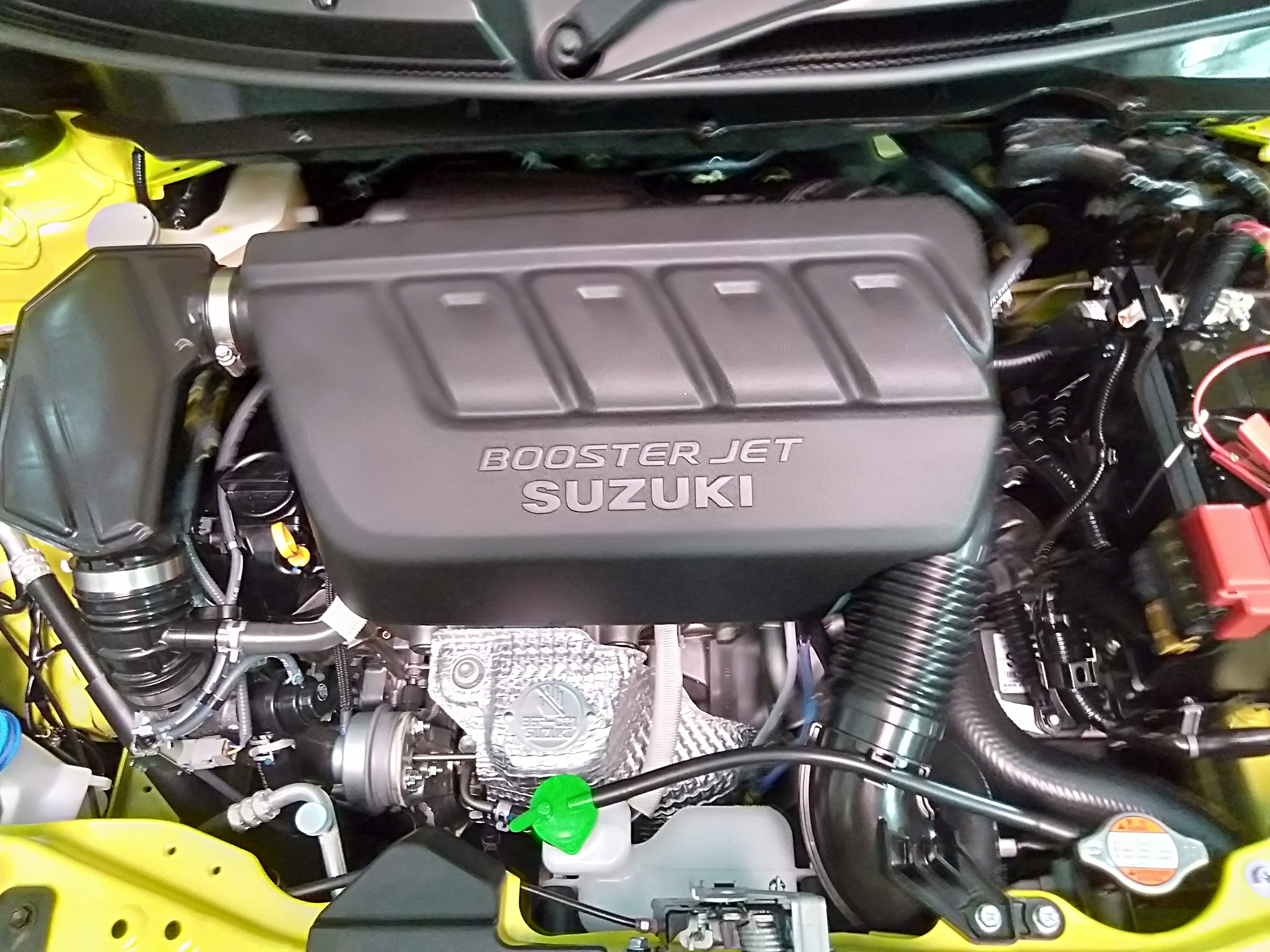
The K14C Boosterjet turbocharged engine used in the Swift Sport

It is equipped with either a 1.25-liter 4-cylinder K12C Dualjet dual injectors gasoline engine developing 66 kW; 89 hp (90 PS) and 120 N⋅m (89 lbf⋅ft) of torque or a 1.0-liter 3-cylinder K10C Boosterjet direct injection turbocharged gasoline engine for the global market developing 82 kW; 109 hp (111 PS) and 160–170 N⋅m (118–125 lbf⋅ft) of torque, both engines are available for regular and mild hybrid forms depending on the market. As standard, all engines are mated with a 5-speed manual transmission (6-speed for Swift Sport), this transmission is also standard for mild hybrid (pre-facelift) and AWD (1.25-liter only) models in Europe. The 1.25-liter engine can be selected with CVT transmission option and the 6-speed automatic transmission option is available exclusively for the turbocharged engines.

For the Japanese market, the 1.25-liter K12C Dualjet engine is offered in three variants; regular gasoline engine, mild hybrid and full hybrid, depending on the trim levels. Unlike in Europe, the AWD model can be ordered with CVT transmission option and the full hybrid model is only available with a 5-speed clutchless automated manual transmission (AGS). The 1.0-liter turbocharged engine was also offered in RSt trim until May 2020 and only available with automatic transmission. The engine is tuned to run with regular octane gasoline (90–95 RON) which is only producing 75 kW; 101 hp (102 PS) and 150 N⋅m (111 lbf⋅ft) of torque.

In India though, it is expected to come equipped the familiar 61 kW; 82 hp (83 PS) 1.2-liter 4-cylinder K12M gasoline engine and a 55 kW; 74 hp (75 PS) 1.25-liter Fiat-sourced (D13A) turbodiesel engine variant from the previous generations. The former is also available in Latin America, Caribbean, Africa, Middle East and several Asian countries; while the latter was only available for Indian market and discontinued in April 2020.

The Thai-market third generation Swift received the reworked 1.2-liter K12M engine with Dualjet technology in February 2018.

For the 2021 European model, due the implementation of Euro 6d emission standard, both 1.0-liter turbocharged and 1.25-liter engines were replaced by a brand new 1.2-liter K12D Dualjet dual VVT engine with 12-volt mild hybrid system and become standard engine in Europe. This engine is also available for the facelifted Swift in New Zealand, Singapore, Taiwan, Hong Kong and Macau. In February 2021, the facelifted Indian market Swift received a brand new BS6 compliant 1.2-liter K12N Dualjet dual VVT engine.

Several countries in Latin America received K12C Dualjet mild hybrid engine option in November 2021, the engine is only available with a 5-speed manual transmission.

In August 2022, Maruti Suzuki launched CNG version of K12N Dualjet engine in India.

Gasoline engines
Engine/motor	Displacement	Power	Torque	Acceleration 0–100 km/h (0–62 mph)	Top speed	Transmission
K10C Boosterjet; I3-T	996 cc (61 cu in)	75 kW; 101 hp (102 PS) at 5,500 rpm (Japan); 82 kW; 109 hp (111 PS) at 5,500 rpm	150 N⋅m (15 kg⋅m; 111 lb⋅ft) at 1,700–4,500 rpm (Japan; automatic); 160 N⋅m (16 kg⋅m; 118 lb⋅ft) at 2,000–3,500 rpm (automatic) 170 N⋅m (17 kg⋅m; 125 lb⋅ft) at 1,700–4,000 rpm (manual)	10.0 s (manual) 10.6 s (automatic)	190 km/h (118 mph) (automatic); 195 km/h (121 mph) (manual)	5-speed manual 6-speed automatic
K10C Boosterjet SHVS I3-T + WA05A ISG	996 cc (61 cu in)	82 kW; 109 hp (111 PS) at 5,500 rpm + 2.3 kW; 3.1 hp (3.1 PS) at 1,000 rpm	170 N⋅m (17 kg⋅m; 125 lb⋅ft) at 1,700–4,000 rpm + 50 N⋅m (5 kg⋅m; 37 lb⋅ft) at 100 rpm	10.0 s (manual) 10.6 s (automatic)	190 km/h (118 mph) (automatic); 195 km/h (121 mph) (manual)	5-speed manual
K12C; Dualjet I4	1,242 cc (76 cu in)	66–67 kW; 89–90 hp (90–91 PS) at 6,000 rpm	120 N⋅m (89 lb⋅ft) at 4,400 rpm	11.0 s (CVT); 11.9 s (manual); 12.6 s (AWD)	170 km/h (106 mph) (AWD); 175 km/h (109 mph) (CVT); 180 km/h (112 mph) (manual)	5-speed manual CVT
K12C Dualjet SHVS I4+WA05A ISG	1,242 cc (76 cu in)	66–67 kW; 89–90 hp (90–91 PS) at 6,000 rpm + 2.3 kW; 3.1 hp (3.1 PS) at 1,000 rpm	120 N⋅m (12 kg⋅m; 89 lb⋅ft) at 4,400 rpm + 50 N⋅m (5 kg⋅m; 37 lb⋅ft) at 100 rpm	11.0 s (CVT); 11.9 s (manual); 12.6 s (AWD)	170 km/h (106 mph) (AWD); 175 km/h (109 mph) (CVT); 180 km/h (112 mph) (manual)	5-speed manual CVT
K12C Dualjet Hybrid I4+PB05A MGU	1,242 cc (76 cu in)	67 kW; 90 hp (91 PS) at 6,000 rpm + 10.0 kW; 13.4 hp (13.6 PS) at 3,185–8,000 rpm	120 N⋅m (12 kg⋅m; 89 lb⋅ft) at 4,400 rpm + 30 N⋅m (3 kg⋅m; 22 lb⋅ft) at 1,000–3,185 rpm	-	-	5-speed AGS
K12D Dualjet SHVS I4+WA05B ISG	1,197 cc (73 cu in)	61 kW; 82 hp (83 PS) at 6,000 rpm + 1.9 kW; 2.6 hp (2.6 PS) at 8,00 rpm	107 N⋅m (11 kg⋅m; 79 lb⋅ft) at 2,800 rpm + 35.4 N⋅m (4 kg⋅m; 26 lb⋅ft) at 499 rpm	12.2 s (CVT); 13.1 s (manual); 13.8 s (AWD)	170 km/h (106 mph) (AWD); 175 km/h (109 mph) (CVT); 180 km/h (112 mph) (manual)	5-speed manual CVT
K12M I4	1,197 cc (73 cu in)	61 kW; 82 hp (83 PS) at 6,000 rpm	113 N⋅m (12 kg⋅m; 83 lb⋅ft) at 4,200 rpm	12.0 s (manual); 12.9 s (CVT) (Note: Independently tested by journalist); 13.5 s (AGS)	165 km/h (103 mph) (AGS); 170 km/h (106 mph) (manual)	5-speed manual 5-speed AGS (India/Africa); CVT
K12M Dualjet; I4	1,197 cc (73 cu in)	61 kW; 82 hp (83 PS) at 6,000 rpm	108 N⋅m (11 kg⋅m; 80 lb⋅ft) at 4,400 rpm	12.0 s (manual); 12.9 s (CVT); 13.5 s (AGS)	165 km/h (103 mph) (AGS); 170 km/h (106 mph) (manual)	5-speed manual CVT
K12N Dualjet I4	1,197 cc (73 cu in)	66 kW; 89 hp (90 PS) at 6,000 rpm	113 N⋅m (12 kg⋅m; 83 lb⋅ft) at 4,200 rpm	13.2 s (AGS)	-	5-speed manual 5-speed AGS
K14C Boosterjet I4-T	1,373 cc (84 cu in)	103 kW; 138 hp (140 PS) at 5,500 rpm	230 N⋅m (23 kg⋅m; 170 lb⋅ft) at 2,500–3,500 rpm	8.1 s 7.4 s (manual); 7.0 s (automatic)	210 km/h (130 mph)	6-speed manual 6-speed automatic (not available in Europe)
K14D Boosterjet SHVS I4-T+WA06B ISG	1,373 cc (84 cu in)	95 kW; 127 hp (129 PS) at 5,500 rpm + 10.0 kW; 13.4 hp (13.6 PS) at 3,000 rpm	235 N⋅m (24 kg⋅m; 173 lb⋅ft) at 2,000–3,000 rpm + 53 N⋅m (5 kg⋅m; 39 lb⋅ft) at 500 rpm	9.1 s 8.2 s	210 km/h (130 mph)	6-speed manual
CNG engine (India)				9.1 s 8.2 s	210 km/h (130 mph)	
Engine	Displacement	Power	Torque	Acceleration 0–100 km/h (0–62 mph)	Top speed	Transmission
K12N Dualjet I4	1,197 cc (73 cu in)	57.0 kW; 76.4 hp (77.5 PS) at 6,000 rpm	98.5 N⋅m (10 kg⋅m; 73 lb⋅ft) at 4,300 rpm	–	–	5-speed manual
Diesel engine (India)
Engine	Displacement	Power	Torque	Acceleration 0–100 km/h (0–62 mph)	Top speed	Transmission
D13A DDiS; I4-TD	1,248 cc (76 cu in)	55 kW; 74 hp (75 PS) at 4,000 rpm	190 N⋅m (140 lb⋅ft) at 2,000 rpm	13.6 s (manual)	160 km/h (99 mph)	5-speed manual 5-speed AGS

=== Safety ===
- Euro NCAP (2017, Japanese-made)
  - With safety pack –
  - Standard –
- JNCAP (in Japanese) –

Global NCAP 1.0 test results (India) Maruti Suzuki Swift – 2 Airbags (2018, similar to Latin NCAP 2013)
Test	Score	Stars
Adult occupant protection	7.08/17.00	2 /5 stars
Child occupant protection	16.23/49.00	2 /5 stars

Global NCAP 2.0 test results (India) Maruti Suzuki Swift (H2 2022, similar to Latin NCAP 2016)
Test	Score	Stars
Adult occupant protection	19.19/34.00	1 /5 stars
Child occupant protection	16.68/49.00	1 /5 stars

Latin NCAP 3.0 test results Suzuki Swift + 2 Airbags (2021, similar to Euro NCAP 2014)
Test	Points	%
Overall:	0 /5 stars	
Adult occupant:	6.21	16%
Child occupant:	0.00	0%
Pedestrian:	31.71	66%
Safety assist:	3.00	7%

ANCAP test results* Suzuki Swift GL (base) variants only (2017)
Test	Score
Overall	4 /5 stars
Frontal offset	14.39/16
Side impact	15.74/16
Pole	2/2
Seat belt reminders	3/3
Whiplash protection	Good
Pedestrian protection	Good
Electronic stability control	Standard

ANCAP test results* Suzuki Swift all variants except GL (base) variants (2017)
Test	Score
Overall	4 /5 stars
Frontal offset	14.39/16
Side impact	15.74/16
Pole	2/2
Seat belt reminders	3/3
Whiplash protection	Good
Pedestrian protection	Good
Electronic stability control	Standard

ASEAN NCAP test results Suzuki Swift (2018)
Test	Points
Overall:	4 /5 stars
Adult occupant:	38.46
Child occupant:	19.95
Safety assist:	12.64

== Fourth generation (AOL; 2023) ==
Fourth generation
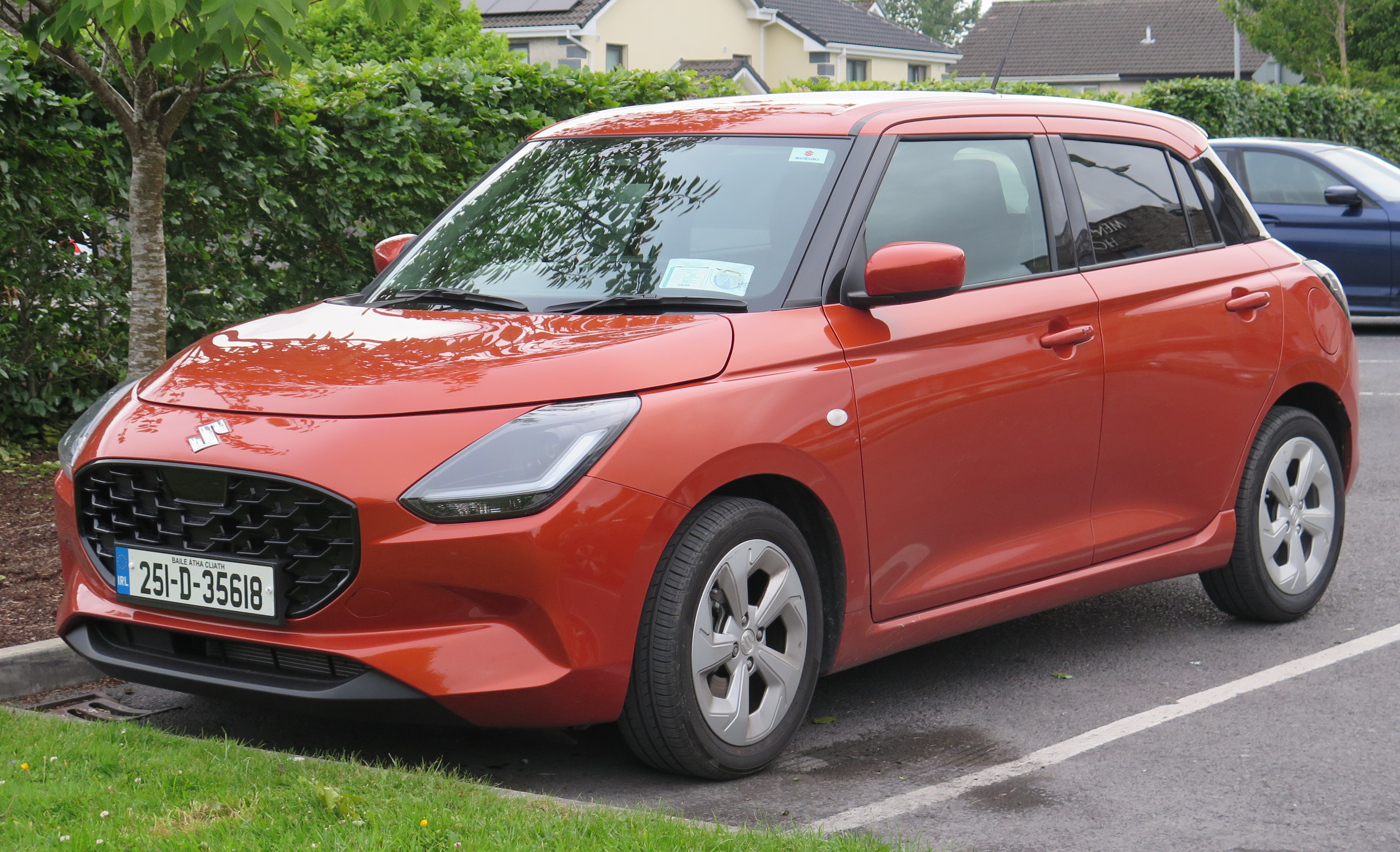
- Suzuki Swift Hybrid (Europe)

Overview
- Model code: AOL
- Production: December 2023–present
- Assembly: Japan: Makinohara (Sagara Assembly Plant); India: Manesar (Maruti Suzuki, May 2024–present)

Body and chassis
- Platform: HEARTECT
- Related: Suzuki Baleno; Suzuki Fronx; Suzuki Dzire

Powertrain
- Engine: Gasoline: 1.2 L Z12E I3 (ZC/ZDDDS); Gasoline MHEV: 1.2 L Z12E I3 (ZC/ZDEDS); CNG: 1.2 L Z12E I3
- Electric motor: DC synchronous WA06D Integrated Starter Generator (ISG)
- Transmission: 5-speed manual; 5-speed AMT; CVT
- Hybrid drivetrain: 12-volt mild hybrid
- Battery: 3 Ah lithium-ion

Dimensions
- Wheelbase: 2,450 mm (96.5 in)
- Length: 3,860 mm (152.0 in)
- Width: 1,695 mm (66.7 in) (Japan); 1,735 mm (68.3 in)
- Height: 1,485–1,520 mm (58.5–59.8 in) (FWD); 1,510–1,525 mm (59.4–60.0 in) (AWD)
- Curb weight: 910–1,032 kg (2,006.2–2,275.2 lb) (FWD); 990–1,070 kg (2,182.6–2,358.9 lb) (AWD)

The fourth generation Swift was previewed as the Swift Concept on 25 October 2023. The production model was officially introduced first in Japan and Europe on 6 December 2023. Swift's biggest market, India, received the fourth generation model on 9 May 2024.

The hatchback is still underpinned by the same Heartect platform, but redesigned to appeal to Generation Z. Despite having a similar exterior design as the prior generation, the refreshed design is claimed to be 4.6% more aerodynamic by adopting back door side spoilers, optimizing the front strake, front bumper and wheel shape. The hidden door handle on the rear door frame is also reverted to the original position to blend with the side body lines and bringing back the older Swift's design identity. The Japanese market Swift received slightly different exterior details such as a different grille mesh design with chrome garnish and an additional rear bumper cover for the top two models. The NVH are also improved with several modifications.

For the interior, it sported a new multi-layered dashboard design similar to SX4 S-Cross or Baleno, redesigned door panels and a bigger 230 mm (9 in) LCD screen for the top model. The safety and convenience features were also revamped with additional front parking sensors, electronic parking brake, driver monitoring system and an advanced collision avoidance system Dual Sensor Brake Support II (DSBS II) which added wider detection range for bicycles and motorcycles.

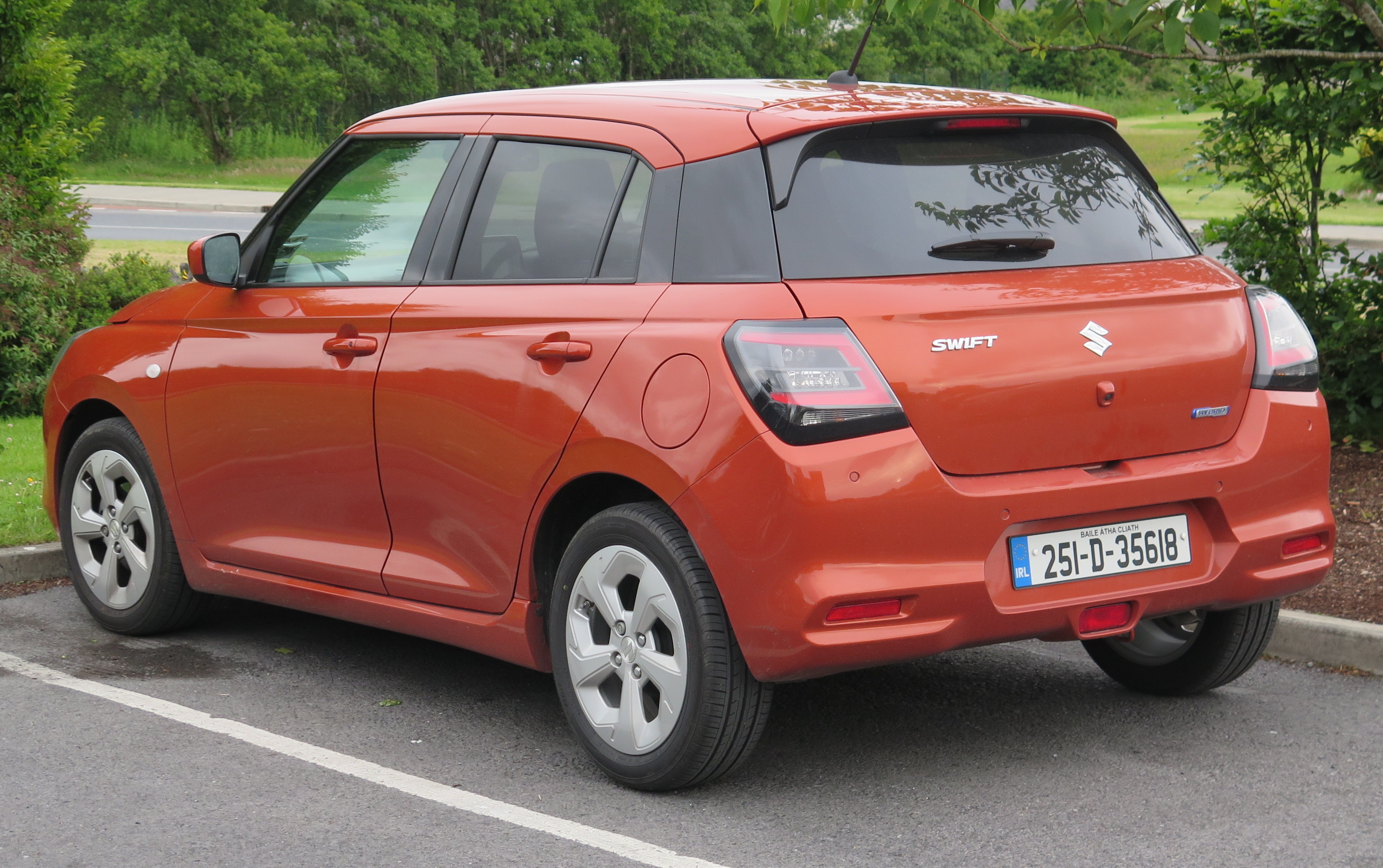
Rear view

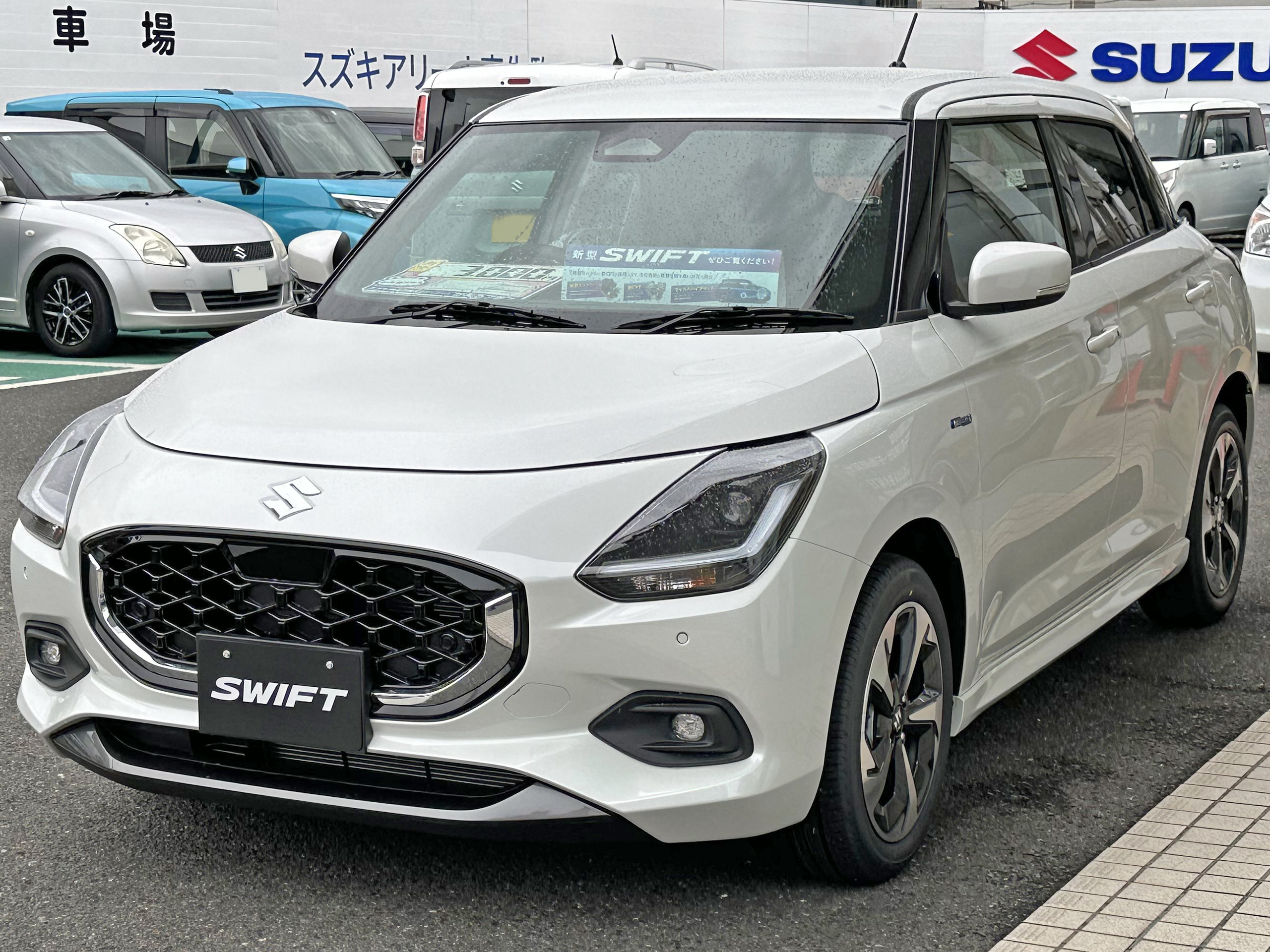
Swift Hybrid MZ (Japan)

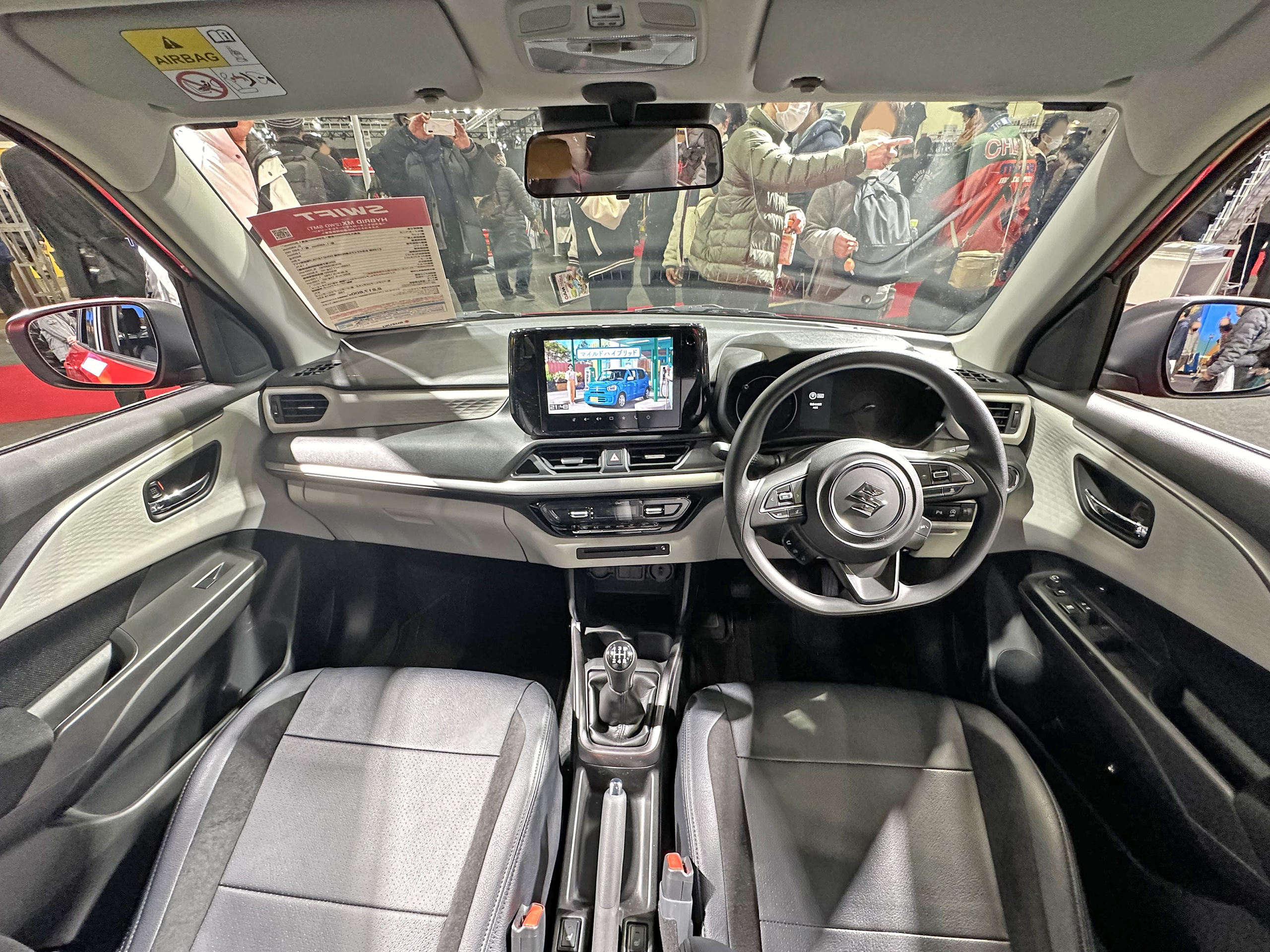
Interior

=== Asia ===
==== India ====
The fourth-generation Swift made its Indian debut on 9 May 2024, with five trim levels: LXi, VXi, VXi (O), ZXi and ZXi+ with either a 5-speed manual gearbox or a 5-speed AMT "AGS", it is powered by the 1.2-liter gasoline engine. A CNG option with manual transmission only was launched on 12 September 2024.

Test mules of the performance-oriented Swift Sport based on the fourth-generation Swift have been spotted undergoing road testing in 2025–2026, indicating that a new model could be introduced in the near future.

==== Japan ====
The fourth-generation Swift was released in Japan on 13 December 2023, with three variants: XG, Hybrid MX and Hybrid MZ. For engines, the XG is powered by the 1.2-liter gasoline, while the MX and MZ variants powered by the 1.2-liter gasoline mild-hybrid. All three variants have the option between front-wheel drive and all-wheel drive configurations.

==== Taiwan ====
The fourth-generation Swift was launched in Taiwan on 10 July 2024, in the sole variant powered by a 1.2-liter gasoline MHEV engine.

==== Vietnam ====
The fourth-generation Swift was launched in Vietnam on 26 June 2025, in the sole variant powered by a 1.2-liter gasoline MHEV engine.

===== Singapore =====
The fourth-generation Swift was launched in Singapore on 8 August 2025, in 2 variants, the DualJet standard variant, and the DualJet Standard (Two-tone) variant.

Both variants are powered by a 1.2-litre three-cylinder engine putting out 82 bhp and 112Nm of torque, paired with a 12-volt mild hybrid system, featuring a combined fuel consumption of 20.4 km/L, and equipped with Suzuki Safety Support.

==== Europe ====
The fourth-generation Swift for the European debut in the first quarter of 2024. The Swift for the European market is identical to the Japanese-specification with a few differences such as a simplified front bumper design and the omission of both the front lip and front foglights. For the European market, it is only available with the 1.2-liter gasoline mild-hybrid engine.

==== Mexico ====
The fourth-generation Swift was launched in Mexico on 31 May 2024, in two trim levels: GLS and GLX, it is powered by a 1.2-liter gasoline mild-hybrid engine.

==== Middle East ====
The fourth-generation Swift was launched in the GCC countries on 25 November 2024, in three trim levels; GL, GL Plus and GLX, it is powered by the 1.2-liter gasoline mild-hybrid engine.

==== Oceania ====
===== Australia =====
The fourth-generation Swift was launched in Australia on 14 June 2024, with four variants: Hybrid (M/T), Hybrid (CVT), Hybrid Plus and Hybrid GLX, it is powered by the 1.2-liter gasoline mild-hybrid engine.

===== New Zealand =====
The fourth-generation Swift was launched in New Zealand on 7 June 2024, in two trim levels: GLS and RSC, it is powered by a 1.2-liter gasoline engine.

==== South Africa ====
The fourth-generation Swift was launched in South Africa on 27 September 2024, in three trim levels: GL, GL+ and GLX, it is powered by the 1.2-liter gasoline engine.

=== Powertrain ===
A brand new 1.2-liter three-cylinder engine called Z12E was also introduced, replacing the older K12D/N Dualjet four-cylinder engines and available in conventional or mild hybrid versions. It is mated to a 5-speed manual transmission or a newly developed lightweight CVT, available for both front or all-wheel drive configurations. A 5-speed automated manual transmission Auto Gear Shift (AGS) is also available mainly for Indian market. A CNG variant of the Z12E engine was introduced in India in September 2024.

Gasoline engine
Engine	Displacement	Power	Torque	Transmission
Z12E; I3	1,197 cc (73 cu in)	60–61 kW; 81–82 hp (82–83 PS) at 5,700 rpm	108–112 N⋅m (11–11 kg⋅m; 80–83 lb⋅ft) at 4,500 rpm	5-speed manual 5-speed AMT; CVT
Hybrid engine
Engine/motor	Displacement/type	Power	Torque	Transmission
Z12E; I3 + WA06D ISG	1,197 cc (73 cu in) + 12-volt MHEV	60–61 kW; 81–82 hp (82–83 PS) at 5,700 rpm + 2.3 kW; 3.1 hp (3.1 PS) at 1,100 rpm	108–112 N⋅m (11–11 kg⋅m; 80–83 lb⋅ft) at 4,500 rpm + 60 N⋅m (6 kg⋅m; 44 lb⋅ft) at 100 rpm	5-speed manual CVT
CNG engine
Engine	Displacement	Power	Torque	Transmission
Z12E; I3	1,197 cc (73 cu in)	51 kW; 69 hp (70 PS) at 5,700 rpm	102 N⋅m (10 kg⋅m; 75 lb⋅ft) at 2,900 rpm	5-speed manual

=== Safety ===
==== ANCAP ====
The Japanese-made, ADAS-equipped Suzuki Swift for the Australasian market received 1 star from ANCAP in 2024 (aligned with Euro NCAP).

ANCAP test results Suzuki Swift (2024, aligned with Euro NCAP)
Test	Points	%
Overall:	1 /5 stars	
Adult occupant:	18.88	47%
Child occupant:	29.24	59%
Pedestrian:	48.40	76%
Safety assist:	9.48	54%

ANCAP test results Suzuki Swift (2024, aligned with Euro NCAP)
Test	Points	%
Overall:	3 /5 stars	
Adult occupant:	26.87	67%
Child occupant:	32.28	65%
Pedestrian:	48	76%
Safety assist:	10.03	55%

==== Euro NCAP ====
Euro NCAP test results Suzuki Swift 1.2 GL+ (LHD) (2024)
Test	Points	%
Overall:	3 /5 stars	
Adult occupant:	26.9	67%
Child occupant:	32.1	65%
Pedestrian:	48.0	76%
Safety assist:	11.3	62%

==== JNCAP ====
JNCAP (自動車アセスメント (日本))

Overall evaluation	4/5 stars
Overall evaluation	90% (177.80/197)
Preventive safety performance	99% (88.70/89)
Collision safety performance	81% (81.10/100)
Automatic accident emergency call system	100% (8/8)

== Sedan version ==
A sub 4-meter notchback sedan version of Swift developed by Maruti Suzuki was introduced in March 2008 in India and marketed as Dzire (Swift DZire for the first two generations) or Swift Sedan depending on the market. The car is positioned below the SX4 sedan and later Ciaz subcompact sedans and also the successor of Cultus-based Swift sedan. Despite designed to suit Indian sub 4-meter car tax bracket (the first generation was above 4 meters), it is also exported to developing markets in Asia, Africa, Latin America and the Middle East.

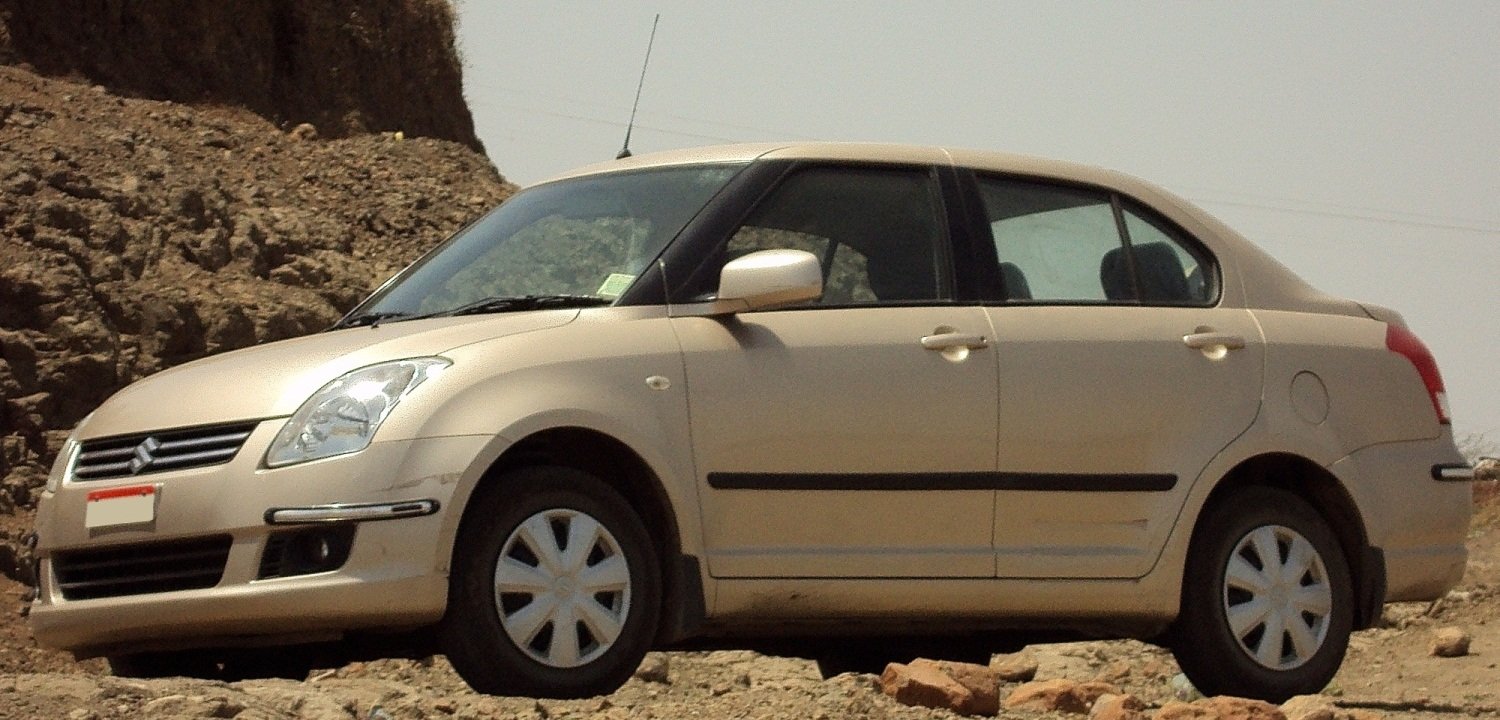
First generation Suzuki Swift Dzire

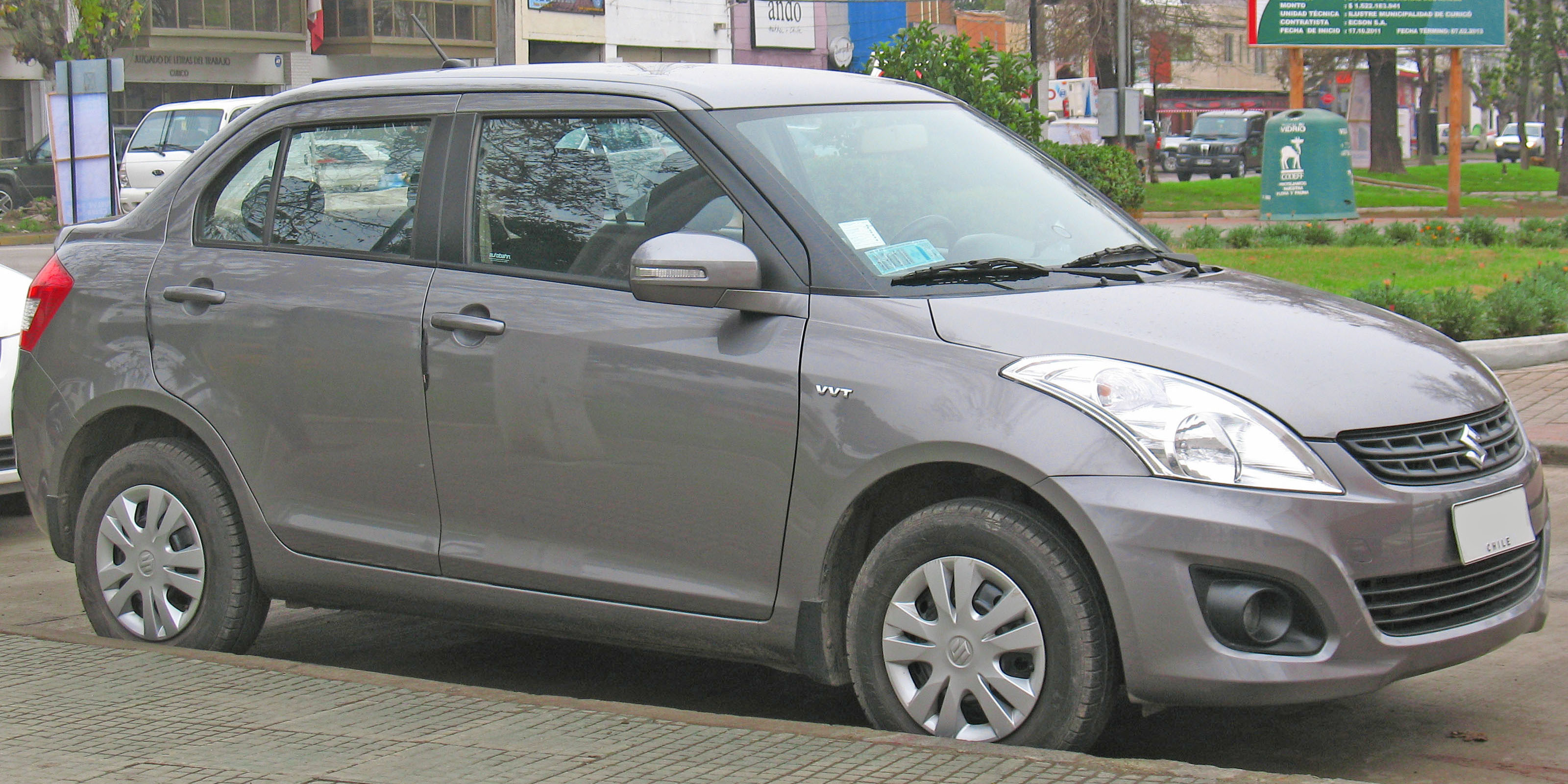
Second generation Suzuki Swift Dzire

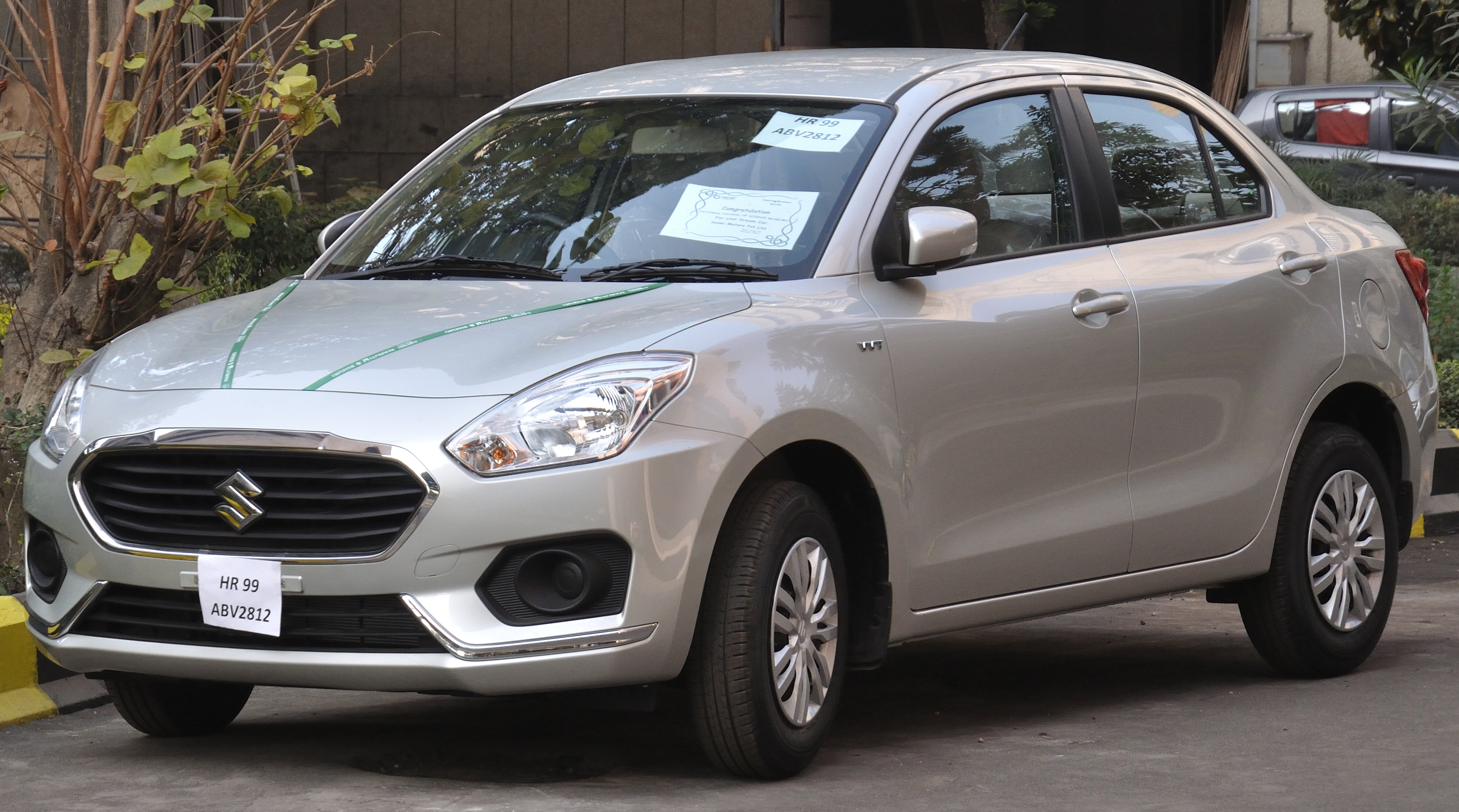
Third generation Suzuki Dzire

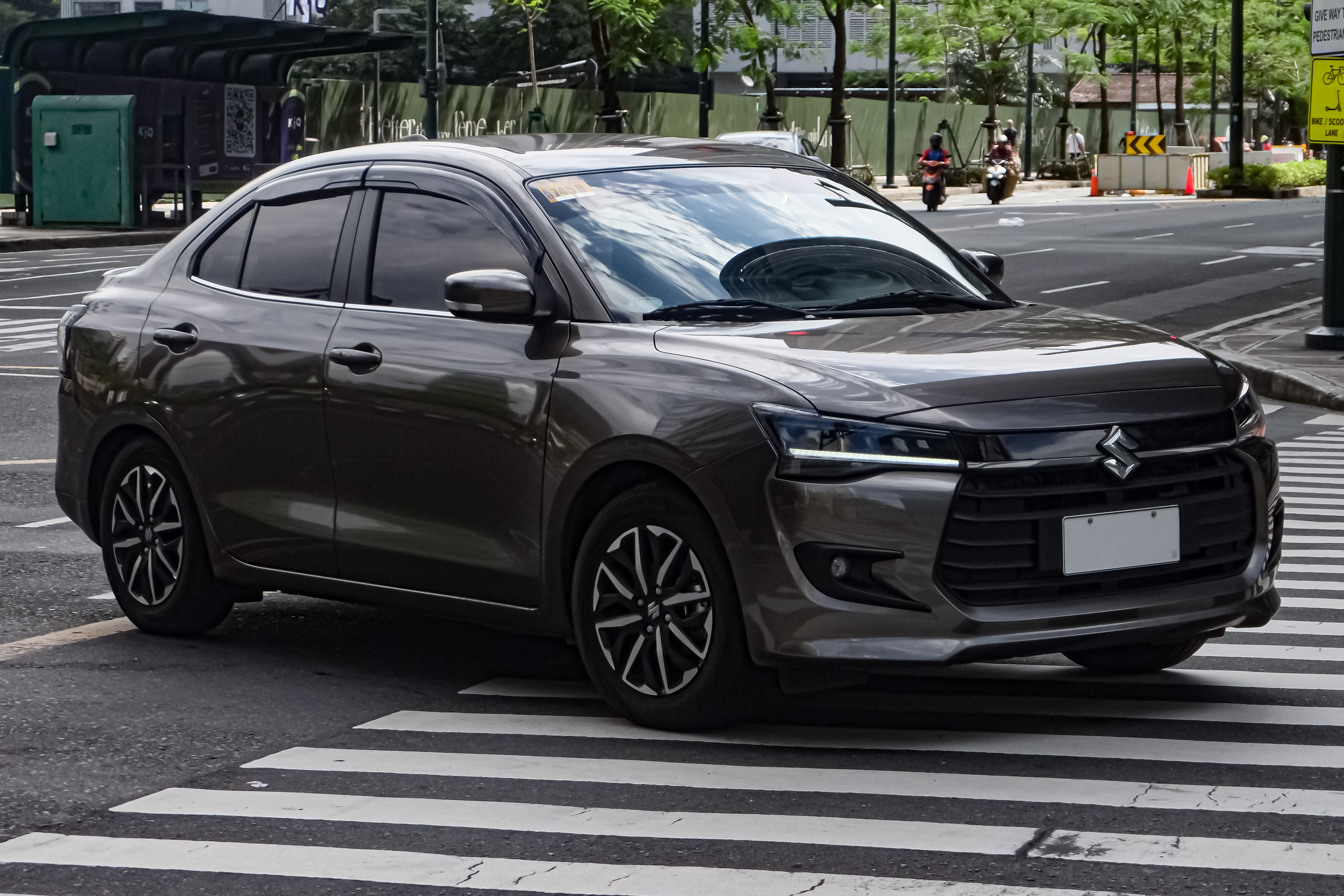
Fourth generation Suzuki Dzire

== Swift EV concepts ==
The Suzuki Swift Plug-in hybrid concept car was unveiled at the 2009 Tokyo Motor Show. The Swift Plug-in concept has an all-electric range of about 30 km (19 mi) drawing on a lithium-ion battery pack. When the battery is running low a small 0.66 L engine kicks in to power a generator that charges the battery.

In May 2010, Suzuki announced a demonstration program with 60 Swift Plug-in hybrids in Japan scheduled to start by late 2010. Initially sales of the Suzuki Swift plug-in hybrid electric vehicle were scheduled to begin by 2013.

The plug-in car is powered by a 55 kW; 74 bhp (75 PS) and 180 N⋅m (130 lb⋅ft) AC synchronous motor and a 2.66 kWh Li-ion battery pack. Average fuel consumption, calculated by combining fuel consumption during operation on electric power from grid charge and fuel consumption during hybrid operation after depletion of the battery pack is 37.6 km/L on the JC08 cycle (88.4 mpg US, or 2.7 L/100 km). Grid charge time for the battery is approximately 1.5 hours at 100 V and one hour at 200 V.

In March 2014, Maruti Suzuki announced that it will provide several copies of the production version, renamed "Swift Range Extender" as part of a pilot project to be conducted in partnership with the Indian government during 2014 to 2015. According to Maruti's tests, the Swift Range Extender delivers a combined fuel efficiency of up to 48.2 km/L (136 mpg_{‑imp}; 113 mpg_{‑US}), with an all-electric range of 25.5 km (15.8 mi). The battery takes nearly 90 minutes to get fully charged. Maruti was awaiting for the implementation of India's National Electric Mobility Mission Plan 2020, which will define the government's purchase incentives for plug-in electric cars.

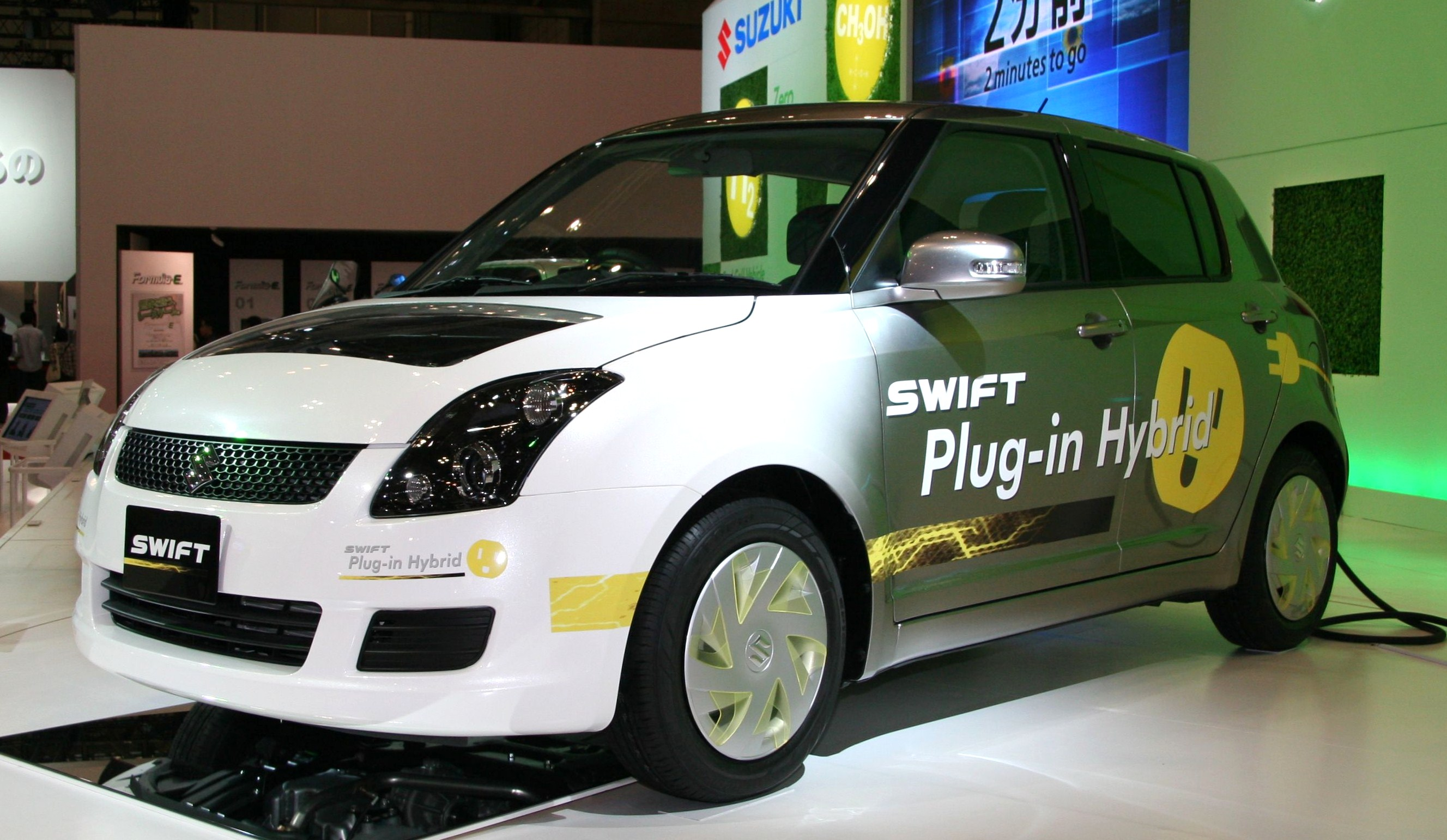
Suzuki Swift Plug-in Hybrid concept (2009)

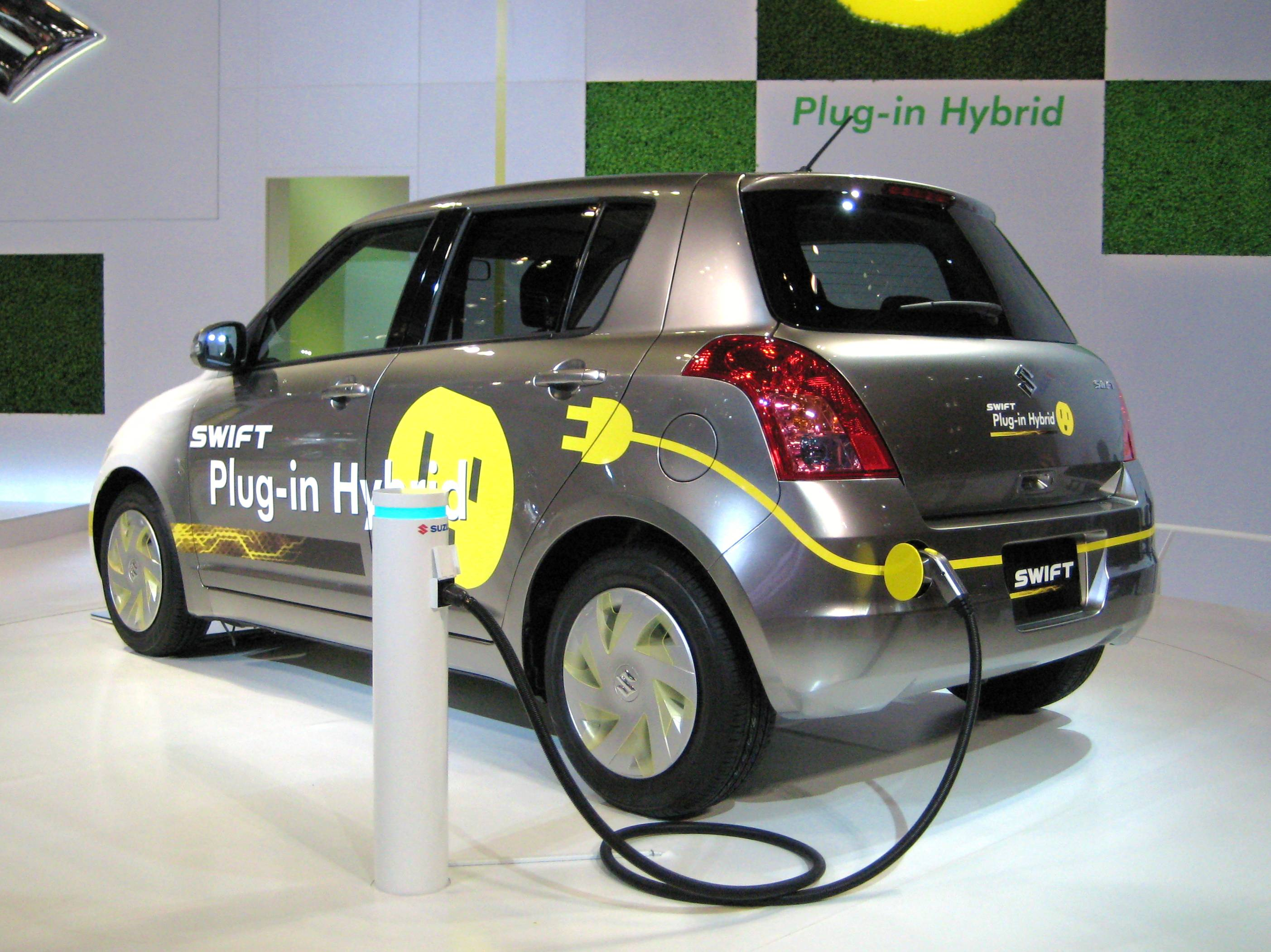
Suzuki Swift Plug-in Hybrid concept (2009)

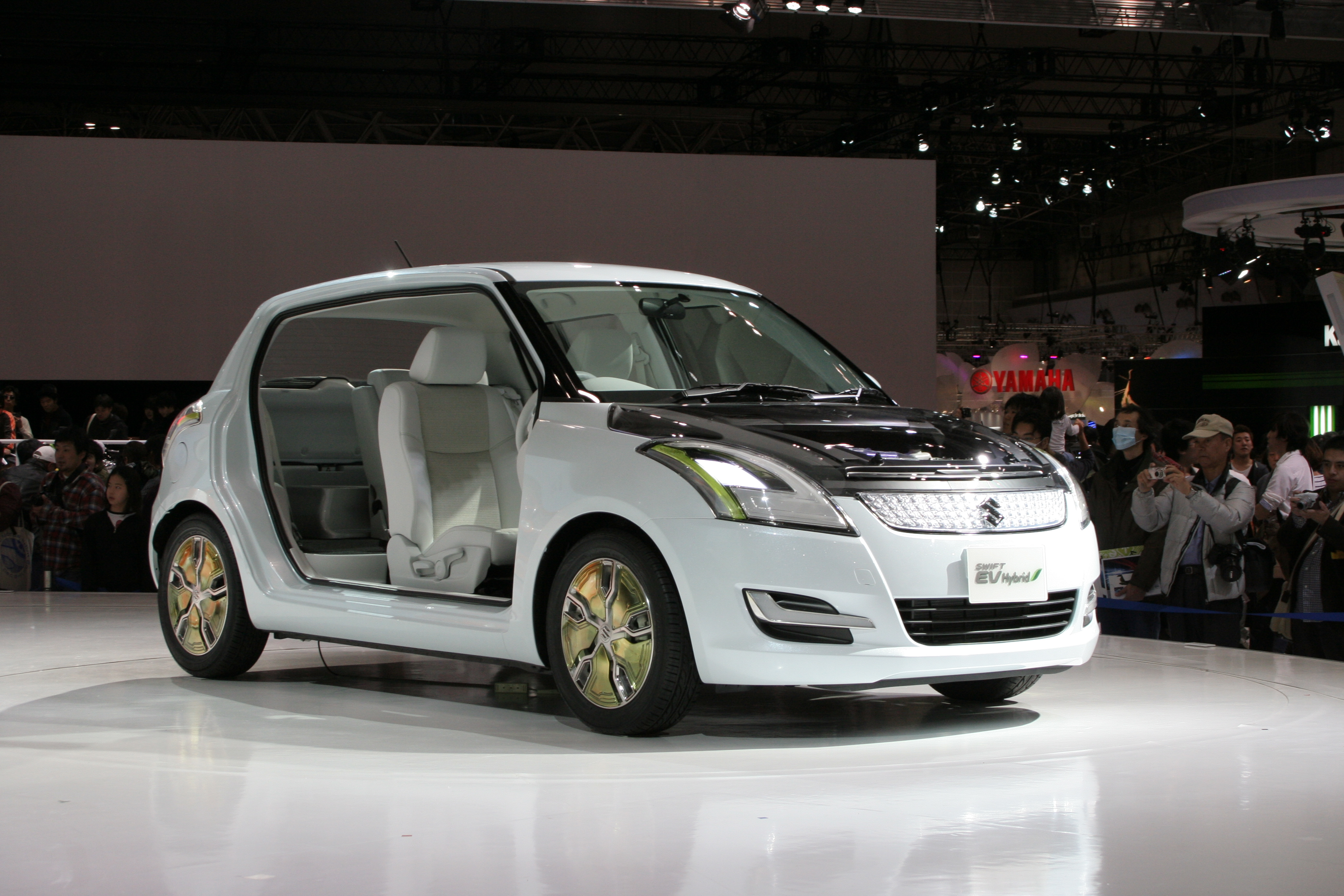
Suzuki Swift EV Hybrid concept (2011)

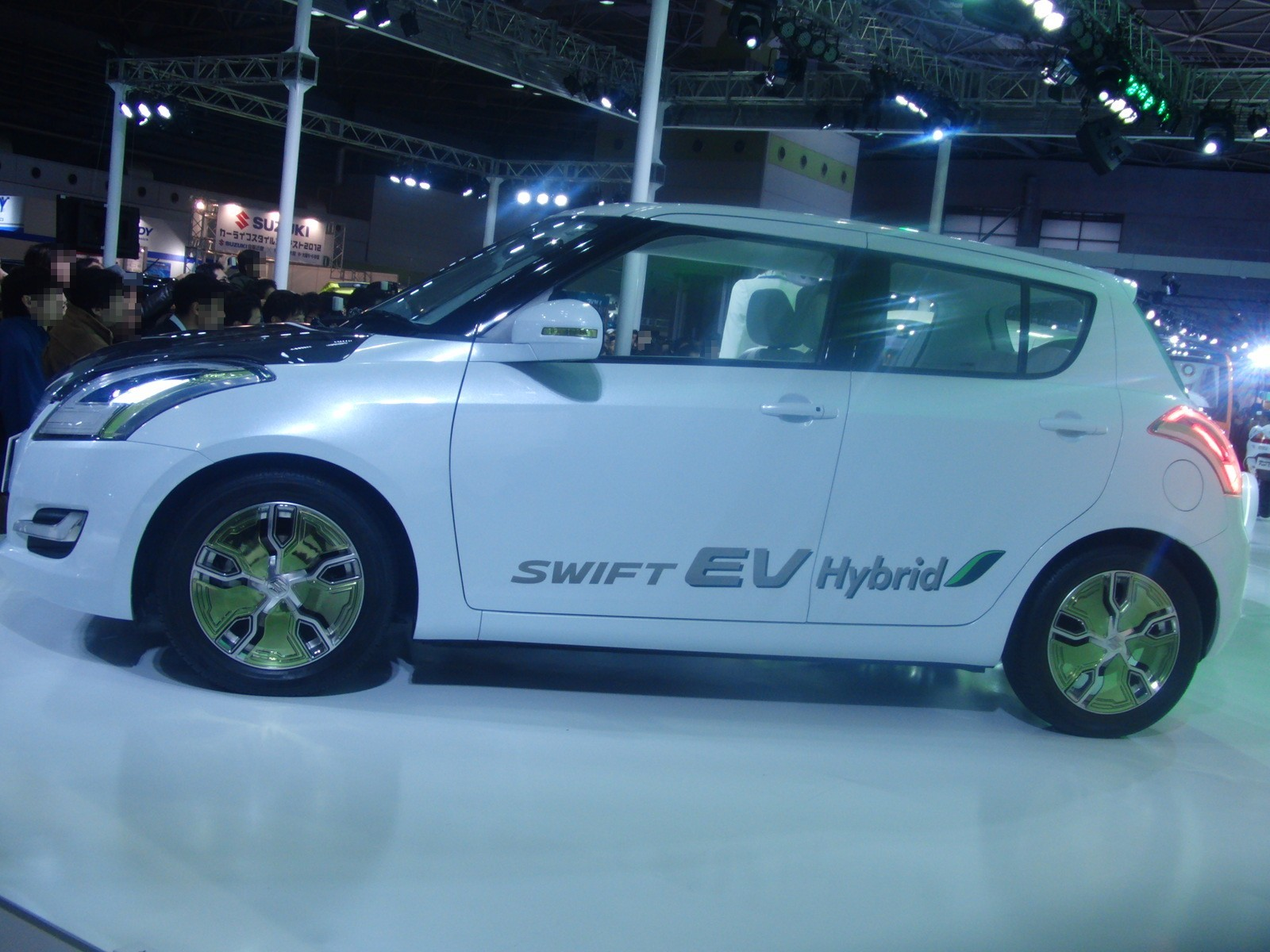
Suzuki Swift EV Hybrid concept (2011)

== Nameplate use with other vehicles ==
=== United States and Canada (1995–2001) ===
From 1995 to 2001, the Suzuki Swift nameplate was reused for the second generation Geo Metro in the United States and Canada. It was still based on the previous generation Cultus/Swift's platform and only available as a 3-door hatchback.

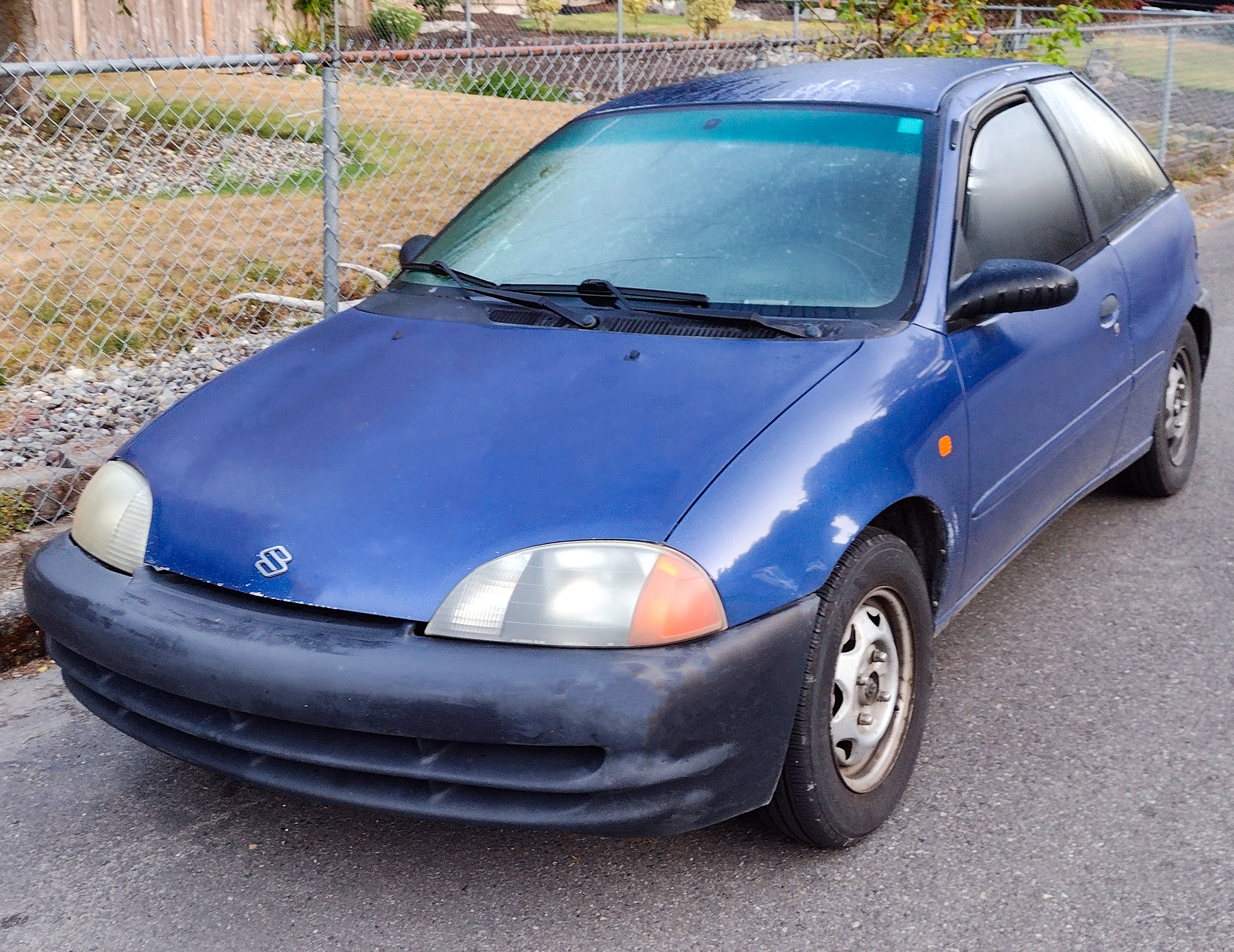
Suzuki Swift (United States and Canada)

=== Canada (2003–2010) ===
In 2003, the first generation 5-door hatchback Chevrolet Aveo was marketed in Canada as Suzuki Swift+, as the replacement of the second generation Second generation Geo Metro-based Swift.

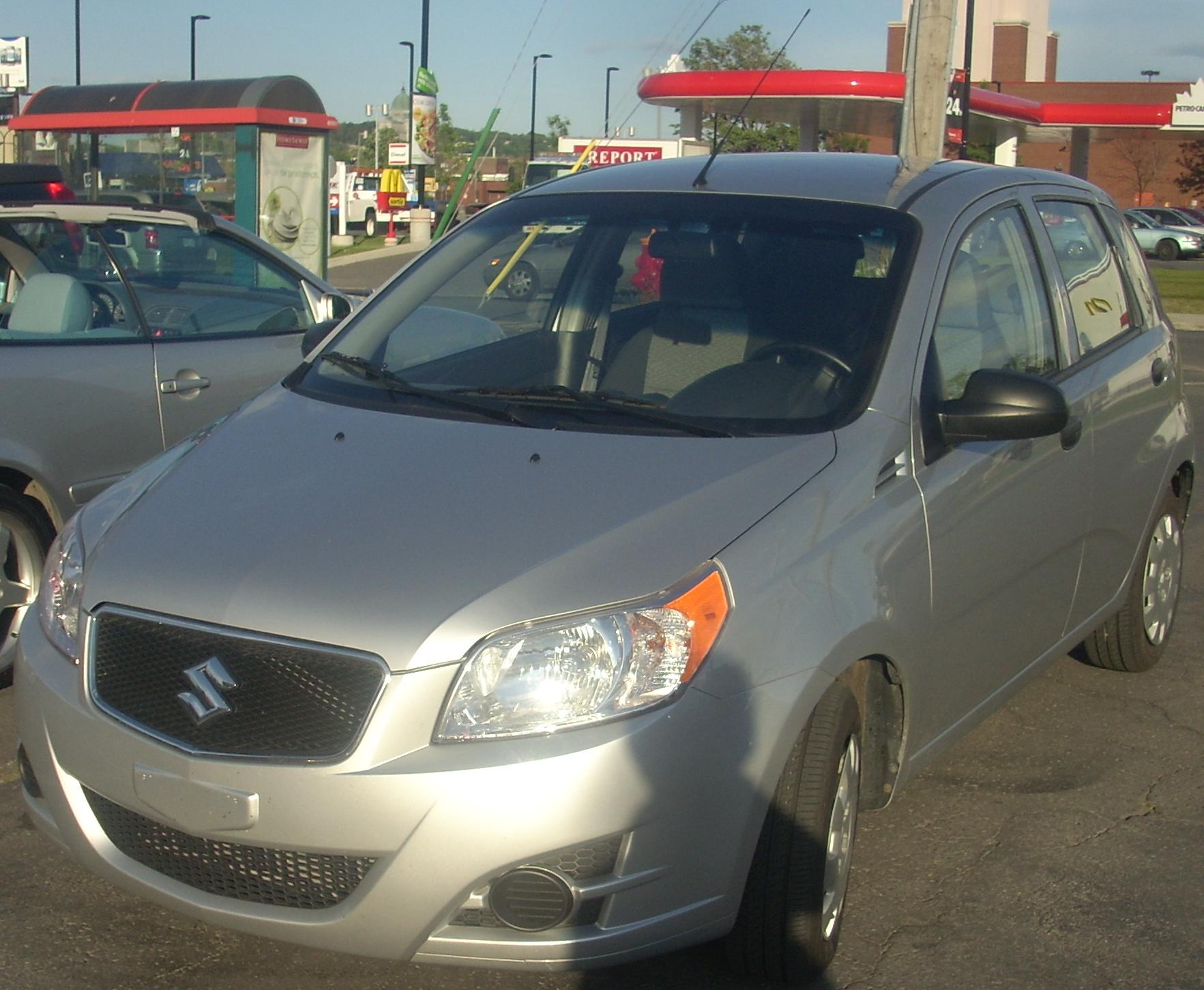
Suzuki Swift+ (Canada)

== Motorsport ==
The Suzuki Swift Sport is well known for being competitive in rallying, especially under 2.0-liter class. In 2007 and 2010, Per-Gunnar Andersson and Aaron Burkart won the JWRC S1600 rally class and also dominating the top three from 2006 to 2010. In 2009, Luke Pinder won the British Rally Championship R1 class. The Swift Sport also successfully won the All-Japan Rally Championship (全日本ラリー選手権), winning in JN1 class from 2016 to 2018 and later in the JN4 class from 2019 to 2023. In Italy, the Swift has been used for Suzuki Rally Cup since 2007 and followed by Rally Italia Talent since 2019.

In Australian from 1995 to 2014, the Australian Suzuki Swift Series was run with firstly the Suzuki Swift GTi and then later on years with the Suzuki Swift Sport EZ (RS416 / ZC31S).Refer to Australian Suzuki Swift Series for more information.

SORTHARE Suzuki Racing Team began racing the Suzuki Swift Sport EZ (RS416 / ZC31S) in 2018 at the Production Car Bathurst 6hr. With a long history of success, details of the results include:

2018 Hi-Tec Oils Bathurst 6 Hour

Class E, Car #55, Michael Hopp, Peter Sortwell & Steve Pittman finished 2nd in Class E and 34th Outright completing 95 laps

2019 Hi-Tec Oils Bathurst 6 Hour

Class E, Car #5, Michael Hopp & Steve Pittman won Class E and 21st Outright completing 113 laps

2021 Hi-Tec Oils Bathurst 6 Hour Racing as Team Engineering Suzuki Racing Team

Class E, Car #46, Matthew Thewlis, Ian Cowley & Daniel Natoli finished 2nd in Class E and 32nd Outright completing 109 laps
Class E, Car #43, Michael Hopp, Steve McHugh & Michael Rice finished 3rd in Class E and 40th Outright completing 77 laps

Securing SORTHARE Suzuki Racing Team's first double podium

2022 Hi-Tec Oils Bathurst 6 Hour Racing as Champ Suzuki Racing Team

Class E, Car #255, Matthew Thewlis, Ian Cowley & David Bailey finished 2nd in Class E and 38th Outright completing 111 laps
Class E, Car #355, Amar Sharma, Ian Applin & Karly Buccini finished 3rd in Class E and 41st Outright completing 109 laps
Class E, Car #155, Michael Hopp & Daniel Natoli finished 5th in Class E and 49th Outright completing 48 laps

Securing back to back double podiums for SORTHARE Suzuki Racing Team

The 2020 edition of the Bathurst 6 Hour was cancelled due to COVID-19

They are also used in the British RallyCross, where they form both their own category, and the car, all drivers in the 14 to 17 year old Junior category must use. As of 2022, there are 12 Juniors and 8 Senior Swifts.

Javier Pardo and co-driver Adrián Pérez from Suzuki Motor Ibérica won the 2021 European Rally Championship in the ERC-2 category by winning all the six rally events in which they were participated.

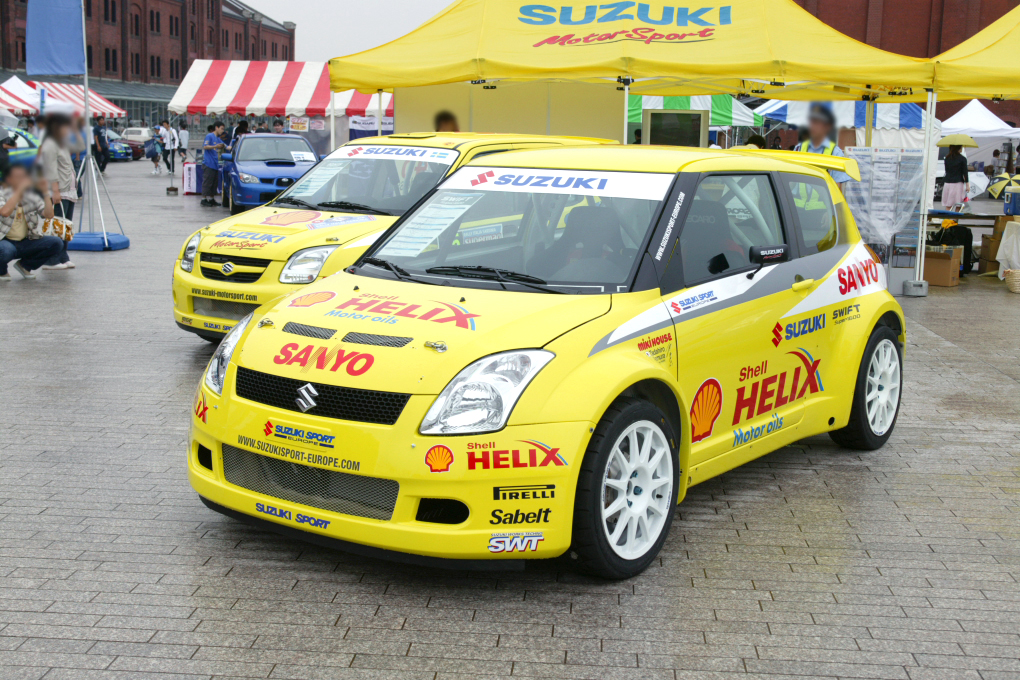
2005 Suzuki Swift JWRC rally car

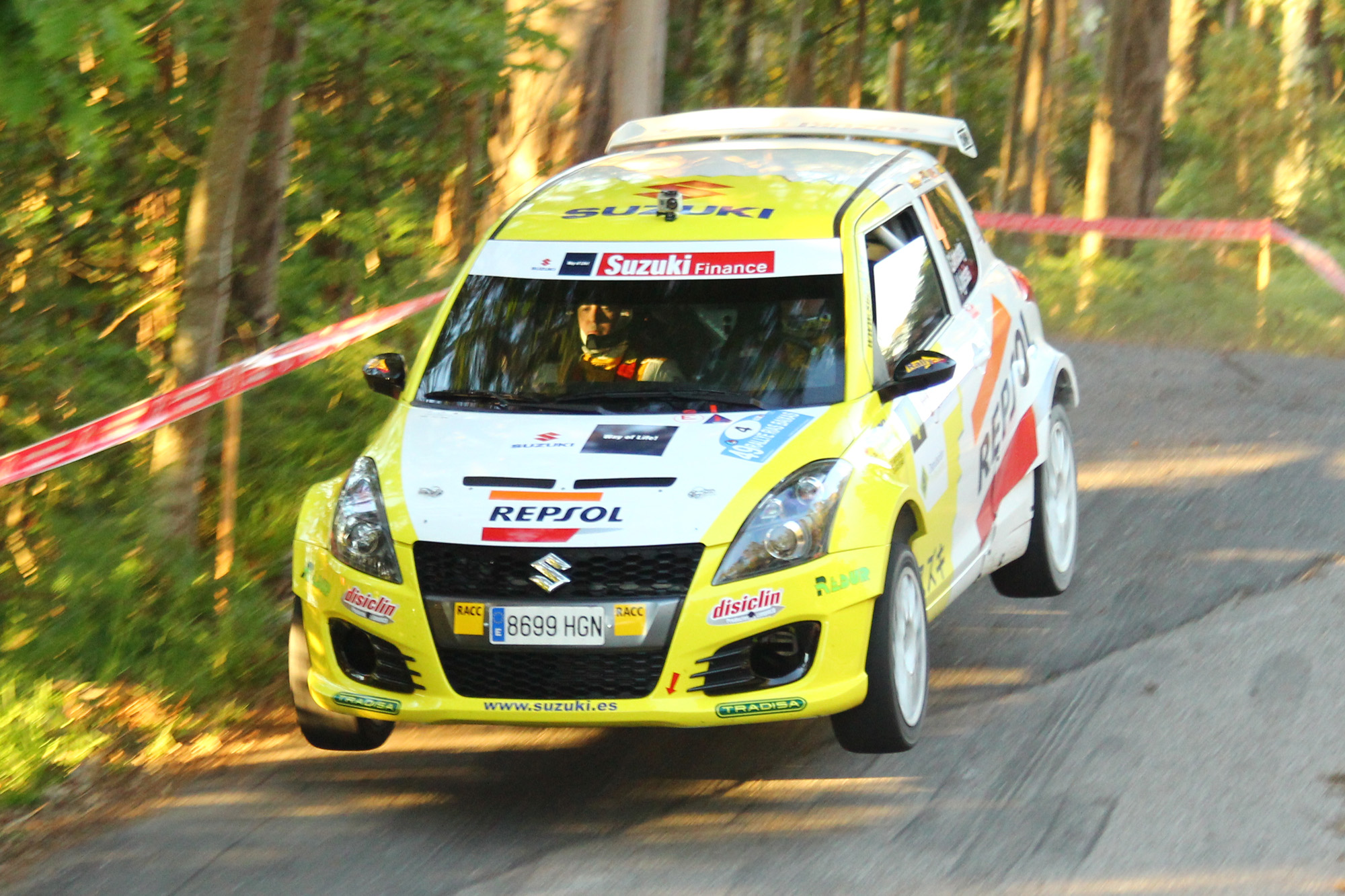
Second generation Suzuki Swift rally car

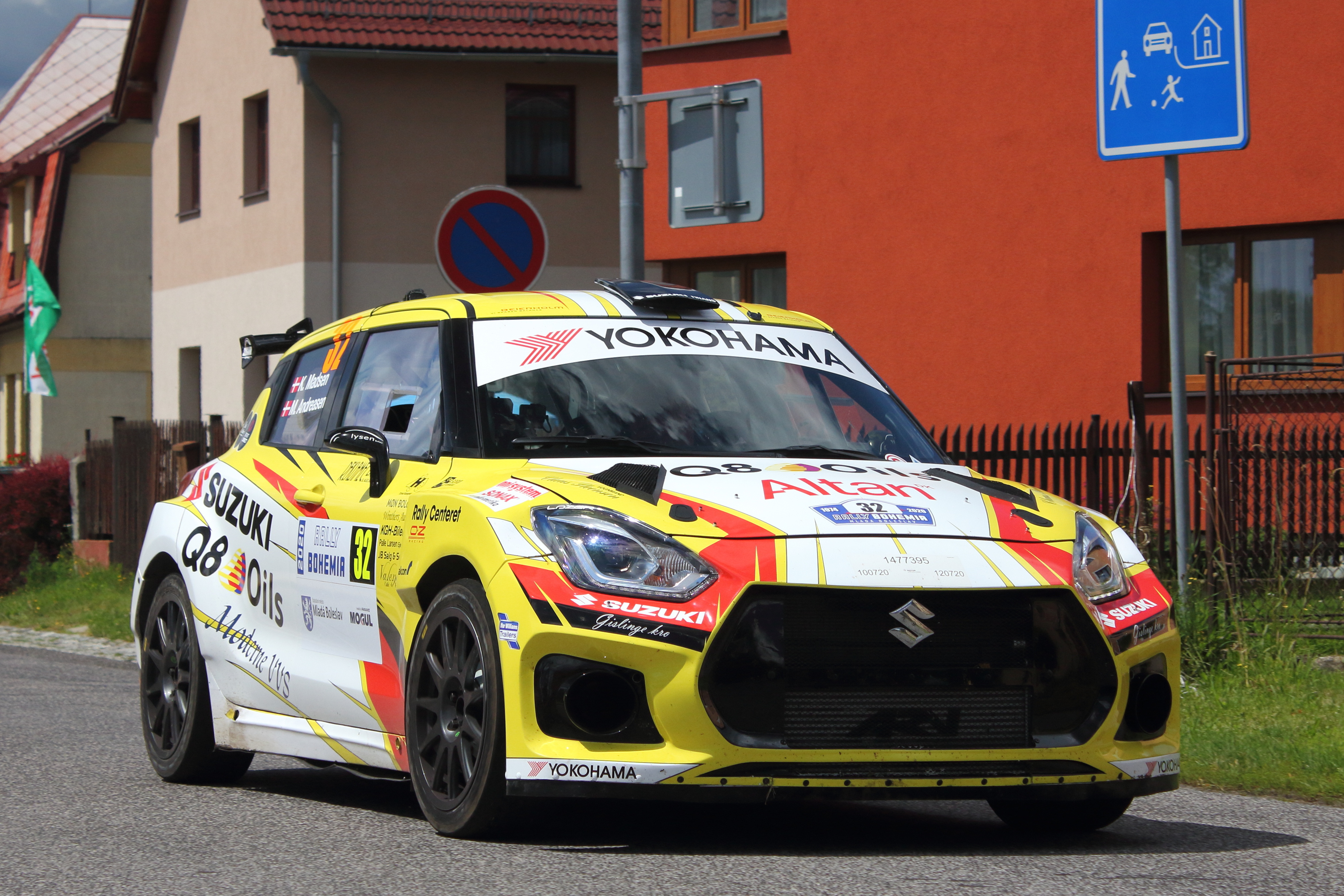
Third generation Suzuki Swift rally car

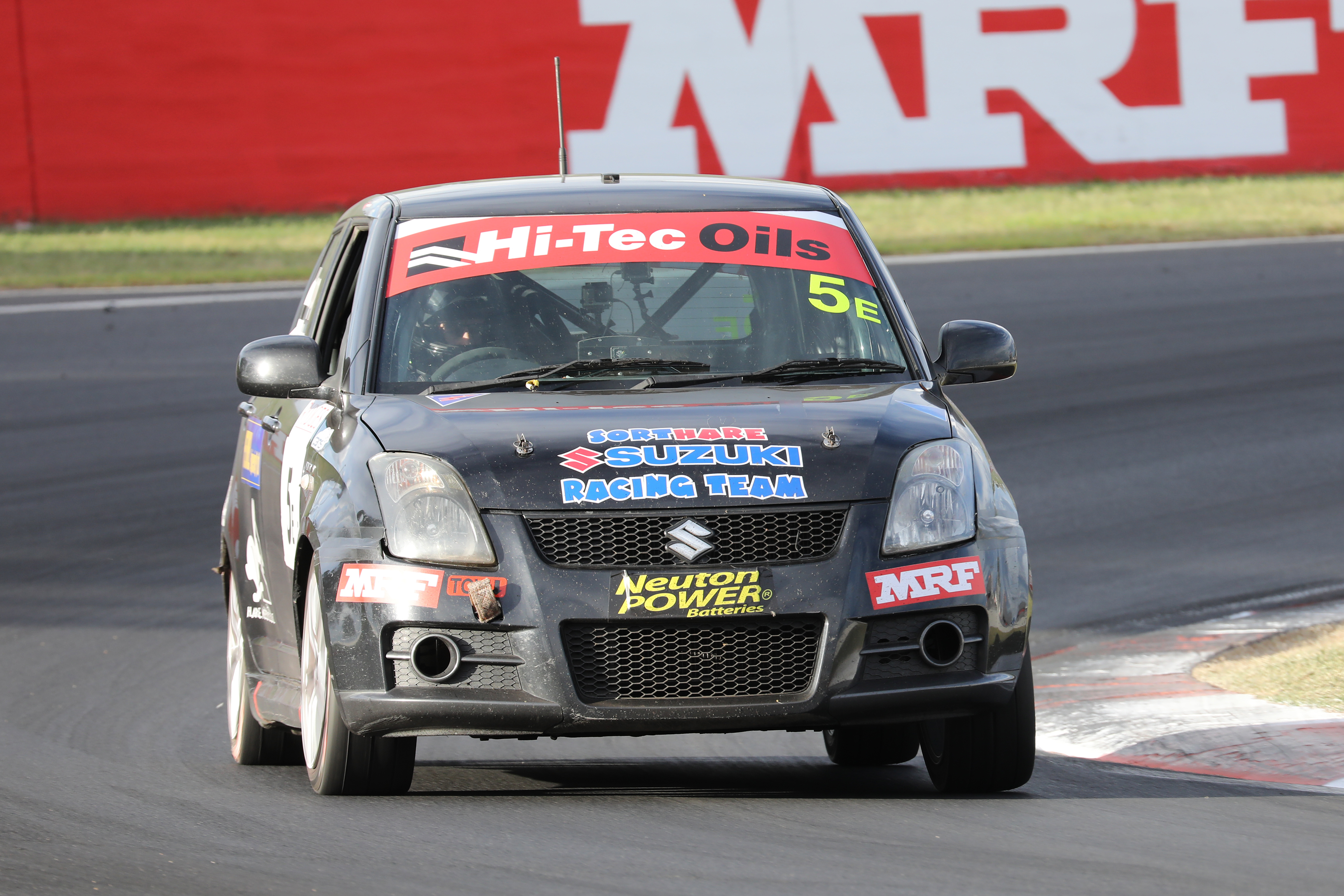
The Class E-winning Suzuki Swift Sport of Michael Hopp and Steve Pittman at the 2019 Hi-Tec Oils Bathurst 6 Hour

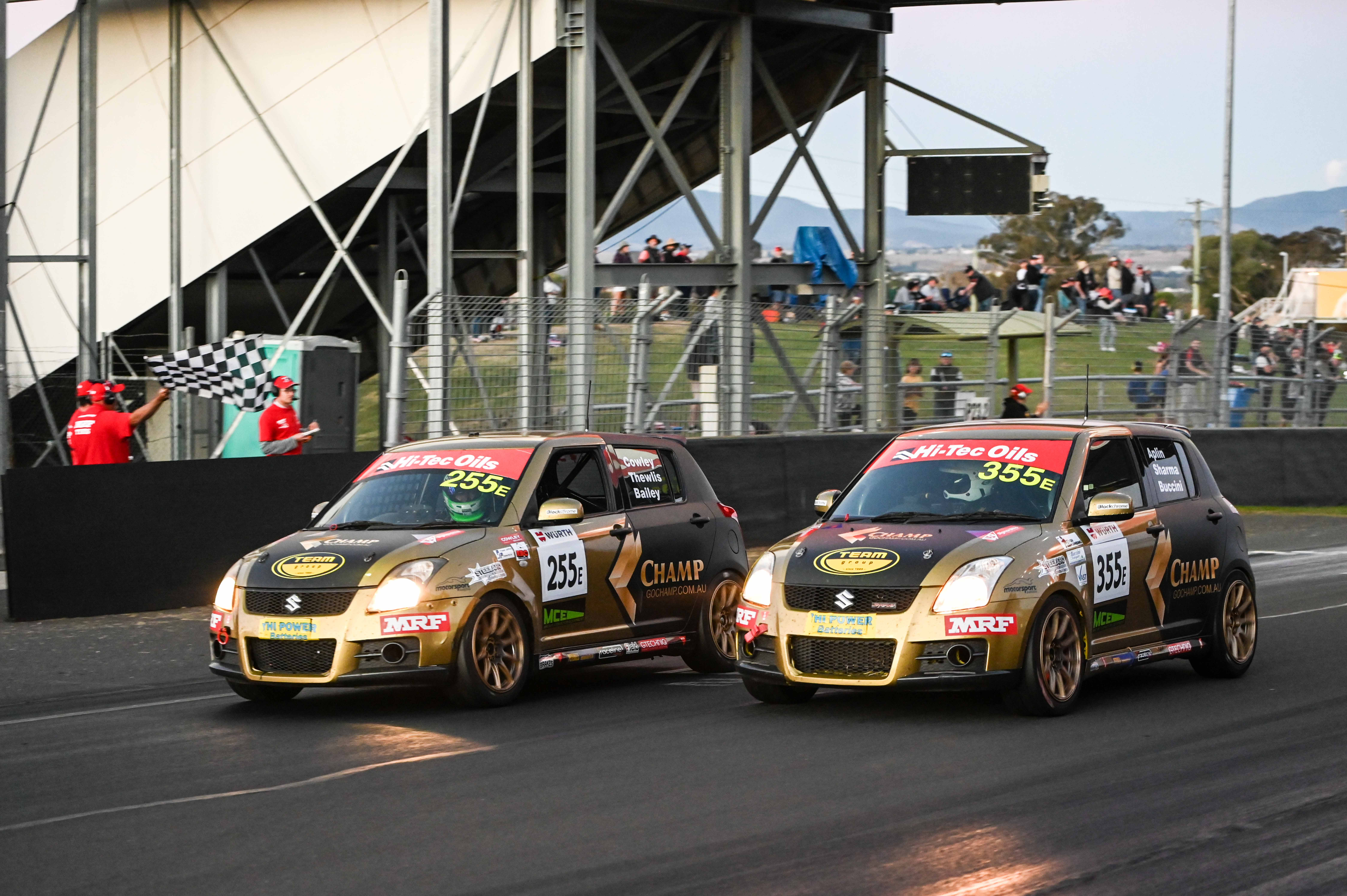
2022 Hi-Tec Oils Bathurst 6 Hour Double Podium Form Finish (2nd & 3rd Class E)

== Sales ==
Since its debut in November 2004, the Swift has been sold in 170 countries. As of July 2025, sales of the Swift had reached cumulative worldwide sales of 10 million units (includes the Swift sedan). Of the 10 million units sold worldwide, 60% were in India, 14% in Europe, 8% in Japan, and 18% in other countries.

The Swift was the best selling car in India in 2012 (combined with the Dzire sedan variant), 2020 and 2023.

Year	Japan	Europe (Note: Car sales statistics are from the following countries: Austria, Belgium, Cyprus, Czech Republic, Denmark, Estonia, Finland, France, Germany, Great Britain, Greece, Hungary, Iceland, Ireland, Italy, Latvia, Lithuania, Luxembourg, Netherlands, Norway, Poland, Portugal, Romania, Slovakia, Slovenia, Spain, Sweden and Switzerland.)	India	Thailand	China	Pakistan	Mexico	Colombia	Chile	Vietnam
2004	34,578 (Note: Mixed with Ignis-based Swift.)									
2005	50,403	56,034								
2006	53,702	92,902			23,709		220			
2007	52,937	121,038			15,584		1,272			
2008	58,950	98,715			16,328		2,016			
2009	46,159	80,616			31,994	2	2,573			
2010	44,589	58,431	142,549		50,589	3,823	2,870			
2011	31,339	64,340	127,916		42,469	5,815	4,232			
2012	43,108	59,423	186,797		33,591	6,913	6,203			
2013	40,926	51,878	199,257		30,533	5,387	7,116			
2014	39,382	49,854	202,831	13,340	35,068	4,375	7,542			623
2015	31,473	54,442	206,924	10,908	21,680	3,803	6,901			865
2016	17,803	44,378	168,555	8,032	19,324	4,282	6,150			
2017	38,442	38,576	167,371	8,080	13,714	4,273	7,344	1,636		559
2018	36,628	55,654	223,630	13,393	6,516	5,284	11,015	1,691		168
2019	33,238	59,875	191,900		18	3,677	10,011	2,060		1690
2020	28,108	51,134	160,765	10,320		1,690	8,765	1,567		648
2021	23,415	59,217	175,052	8,017		1,845	8,212	4,018		553
2022	25,113	29,873	176,424	8,641		12,829	14,774	12,033		636
2023	26,589		203,469	5,570		4,432	12,057	5,694	5,211	401
2024	33,131		172,808	1,979		6,921	11,940	3,164	4,980	225

== Awards ==
The Suzuki Swift has won more than 60 Awards including car of the year awards since its introduction as a global model.

- Most fun to drive car in Japan car of the year awards 2006
- Irish Car of the Year 2006.
- RJC Japan car of the year 2006, 2011 and 2018
- Indian car of the year 2012
- 2011 small car of the year by BBC Top Gear India
- Goldstar award by Wheels magazine Australia
- Best buy hot hatchback by Whatcar magazine UK for Swift Sport
- Best model in city cars by L'argus magazine France
- 2011 Small car of the year by AMI insurance autocar magazine New Zealand
- Best Small Hatchback award by Otomotif magazine Indonesia 2013, 2014 and 2015
- Best Small Car' by the Association of Scottish Motoring Writers in Scottish Car of the Year Awards 2010
- Indian Car of the year 2019
- 2019 The Budget Car of the Year award by Cars.co.za South Africa
