= Nainwal =

- Village
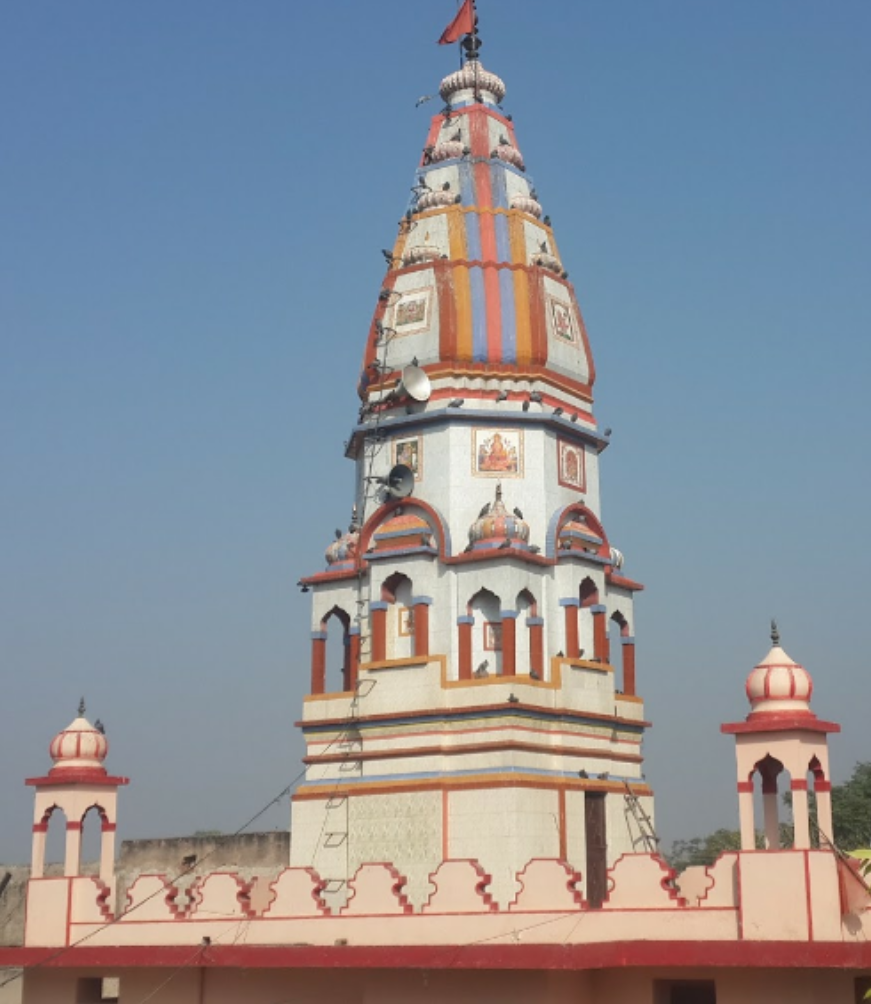
- Mohan Ram Nainwal Temple

- Location in Haryana, India Nainwal (India)
- Coordinates: 28.3351987°N 76.9453133°E
- Country: India
- State: Haryana
- District: Gurgaon
- Tehsil: Manesar
- Municipal Corporation: Manesar

Languages
  - Official: Hindi
  - Spoken: Ahirwati अहीर्वती
- Time zone: UTC+5:30 (IST)
- PIN: 122 051
- ISO 3166 code: IN-HR
- Vehicle registration: HR-26,55
- Website: haryana.gov.in

Nainwal is a village located in Manesar Tehsil of Gurgaon district in Haryana, India. Its Pincode is 122051. It is situated 2 km away from the sub-district headquarter, Manesar and 19 km away from the district headquarter Gurgaon.

The total geographical area of village is 410 hectares. Nainwal has a total population of 987 people. There are about 179 houses in Nainwal.

== Schools ==
- Government Primary School, Nainwal
- R.N. Public School, Nainwal
