= Suzuki Dzire =

Subcompact car produced by Suzuki

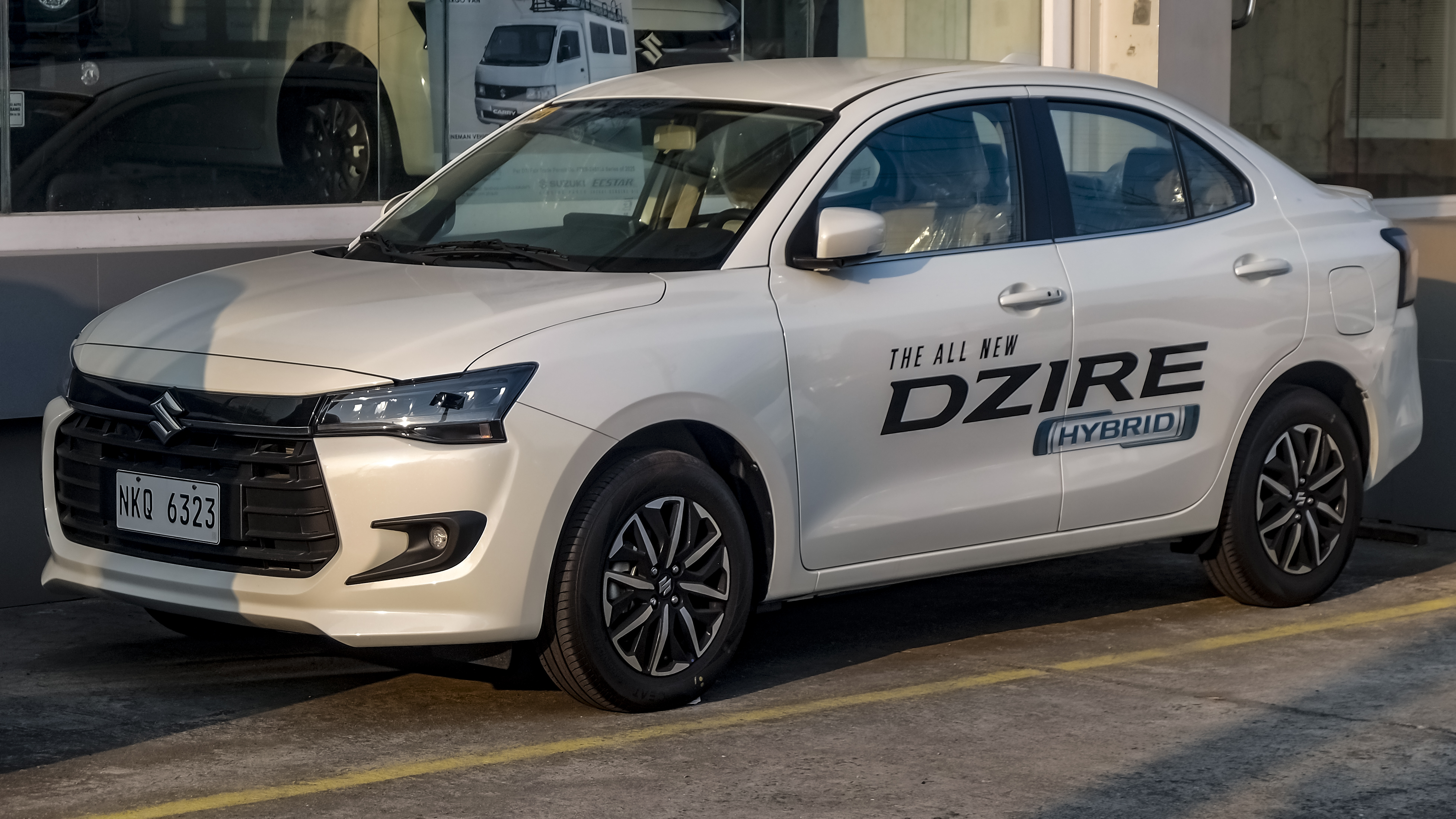
- Suzuki Dzire 1.2 GLX Hybrid

Overview
- Manufacturer: Suzuki
- Also called: Suzuki Swift Dzire (2008–2017); Suzuki Swift Sedan
- Production: 2008–present

Body and chassis
- Class: Subcompact car
- Body style: 4-door sedan (2008–2016); 4-door notchback sedan (2012–present)
- Layout: Front-engine, front-wheel-drive

Chronology
- Predecessor: Maruti Suzuki Esteem

The Suzuki Dzire (stylized DZire) is a subcompact notchback sedan manufactured and marketed by Suzuki since 2008, primarily for India — as a sedan variant of the Swift hatchback over three generations.

Marketed currently as the Suzuki Swift Sedan in Colombia and Guatemala, the Dzire's overall size was reduced to qualify for India's sub-4 meter tax class.

== First generation (2008) ==
First generation
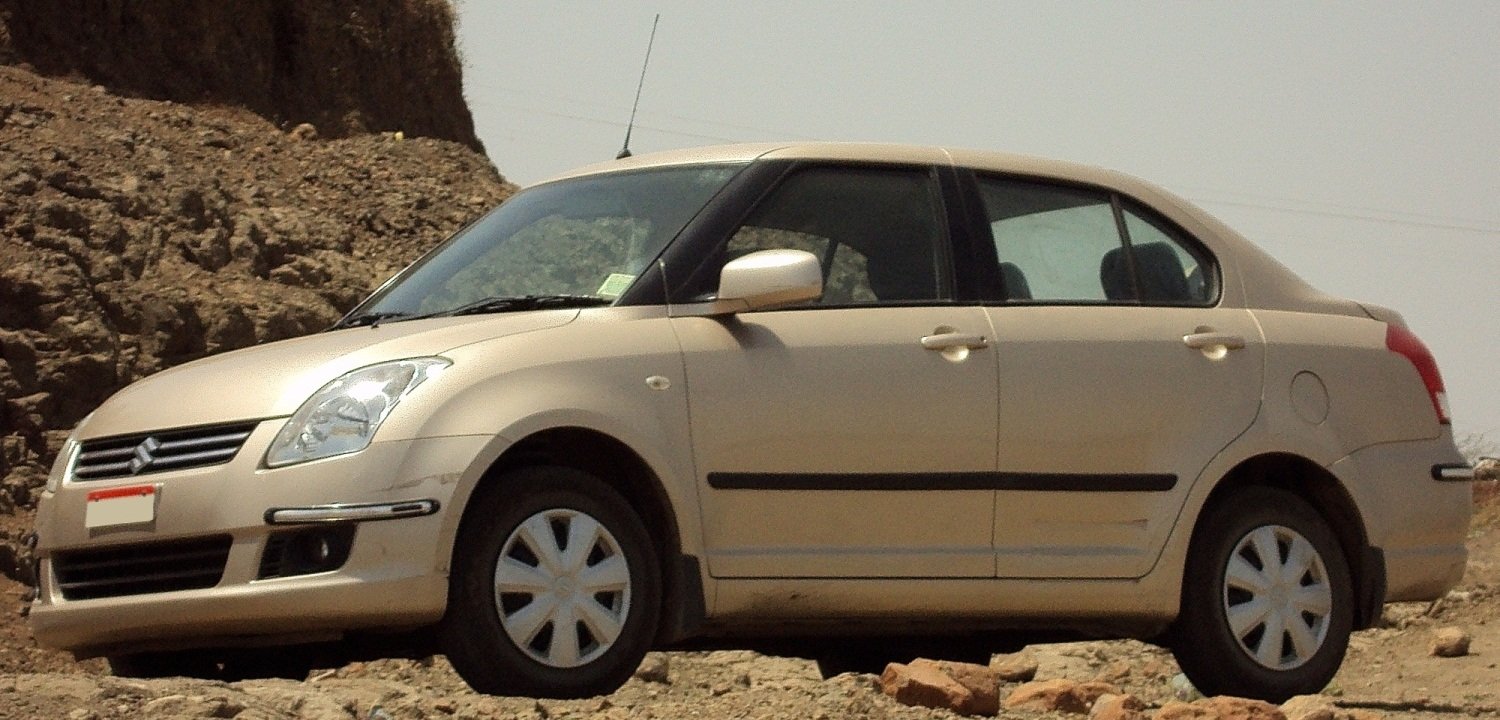

Overview
- Production: 2008–2012; 2012–2016 (Swift Dzire Tour)
- Assembly: India: Manesar, Haryana (Maruti Suzuki)

Body and chassis
- Related: Suzuki Swift (first generation)

Powertrain
- Engine: Petrol: 1.2 L K12M VVT I4; 1.3 L G13BB I4; Diesel: 1.3 L D13A DDiS I4 turbo-diesel
- Transmission: 5-speed Aisin manual

Dimensions
- Wheelbase: 2,390 mm (94.1 in)
- Length: 4,160 mm (163.8 in)
- Width: 1,690 mm (66.5 in)
- Height: 1,530 mm (60.2 in)
- Curb weight: 1,035–1,080 kg (2,281.8–2,381.0 lb)

The Swift Dzire was introduced with a 1.3 L petrol engine and a Fiat-sourced 1.3 L diesel engine. Due to the BS IV emission norms in 2010, Maruti replaced the petrol engine with a 1.2 L K-series engine.

This generation was discontinued in 2012 for general buyers but continued to be manufactured until 2016 for fleet operators, as the Swift Dzire Tour.

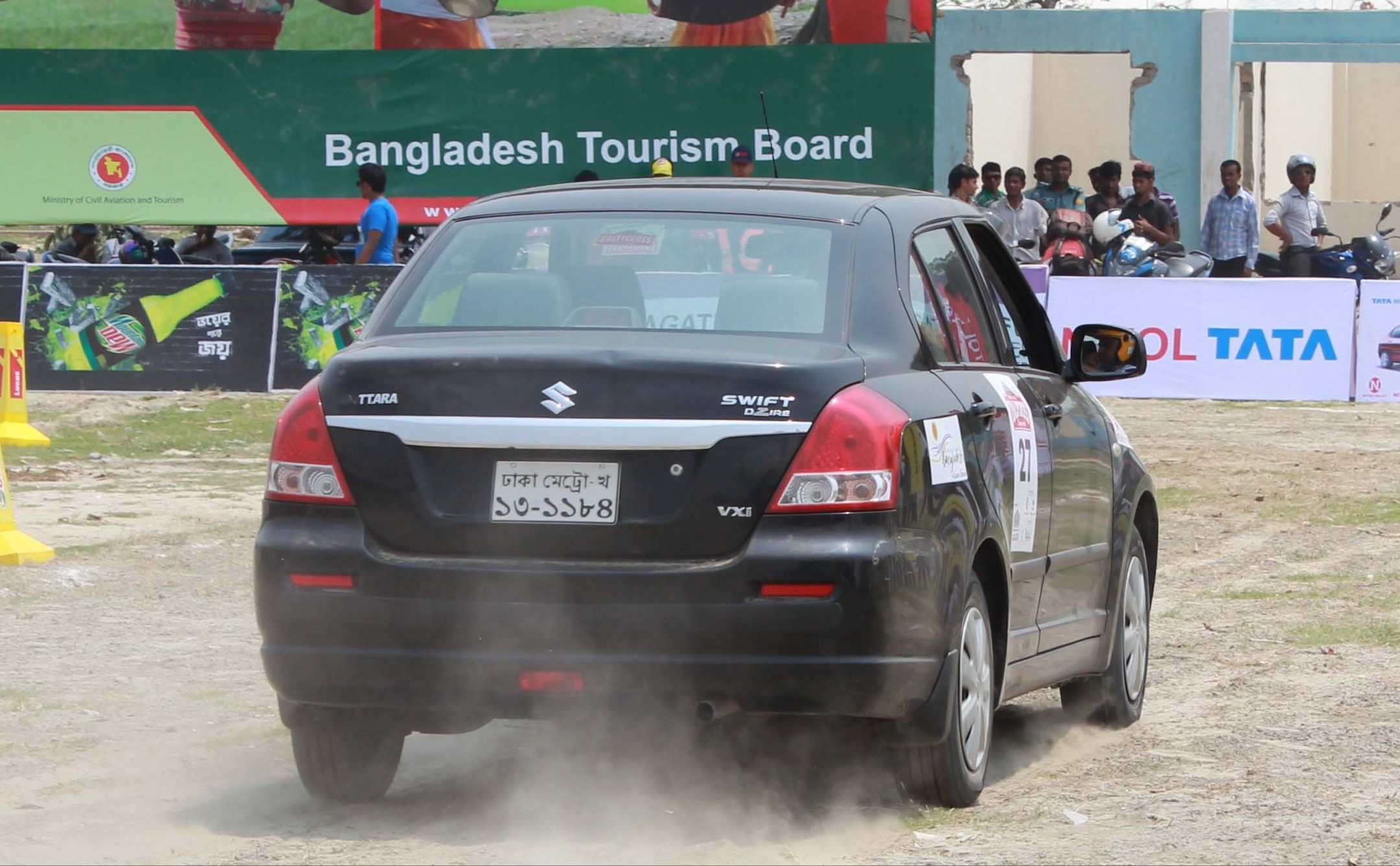
Rear view

=== Powertrain ===
Type	Engine	Transmission	Power	Torque
Petrol	1.2 L I4	5-speed manual	85 PS (84 hp) at 6000 rpm	113 N⋅m (83 lb⋅ft) at 4500 rpm
Petrol	1.3 L I4	5-speed manual	88 PS (87 hp) at 6000 rpm	113 N⋅m (83 lb⋅ft) at 4500 rpm
Diesel	1.3 L I4	5-speed manual	76 PS (75 hp) at 4000 rpm	190 N⋅m (140 lb⋅ft) at 2000 rpm

== Second generation (2011) ==
Second generation
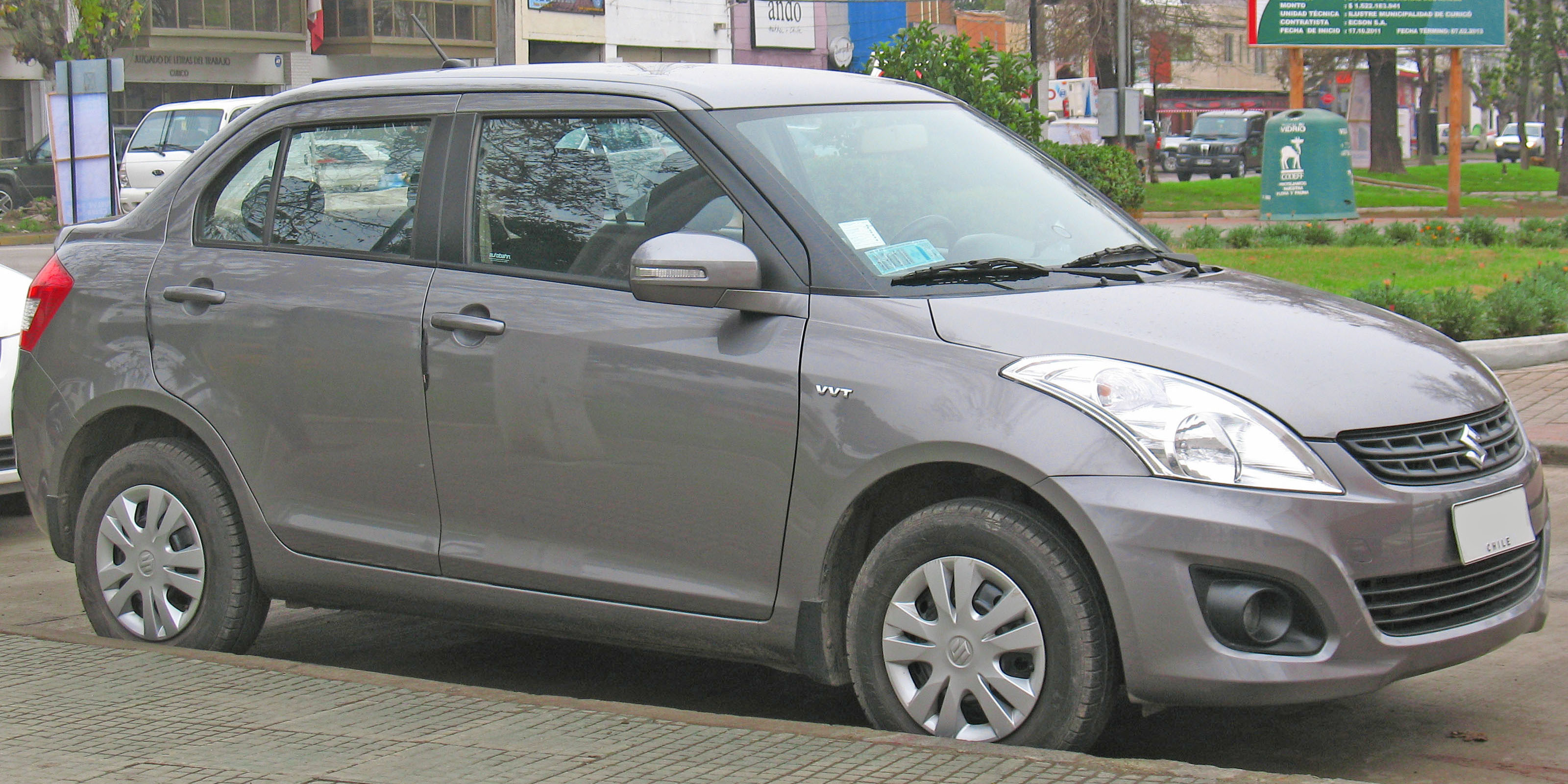
- Suzuki Swift Dzire (pre-facelift)

Overview
- Production: 2011–2017; 2017–2023 (Dzire Tour S)
- Assembly: India: Manesar, Haryana (Maruti Suzuki)

Body and chassis
- Related: Suzuki Ertiga (first generation); Suzuki Swift (second generation)

Powertrain
- Engine: Petrol/CNG: 1.2 L K12M VVT I4; Diesel: 1.3 L D13A DDiS (turbo-diesel)
- Transmission: 5-speed Aisin manual; 4-speed Aisin automatic (petrol); 5-speed Aisin-Magneti Marelli AMT (diesel)

Dimensions
- Wheelbase: 2,430 mm (95.7 in)
- Length: 3,995 mm (157.3 in)
- Width: 1,695 mm (66.7 in)
- Height: 1,555 mm (61.2 in)
- Curb weight: 960–1,070 kg (2,116.4–2,358.9 lb)

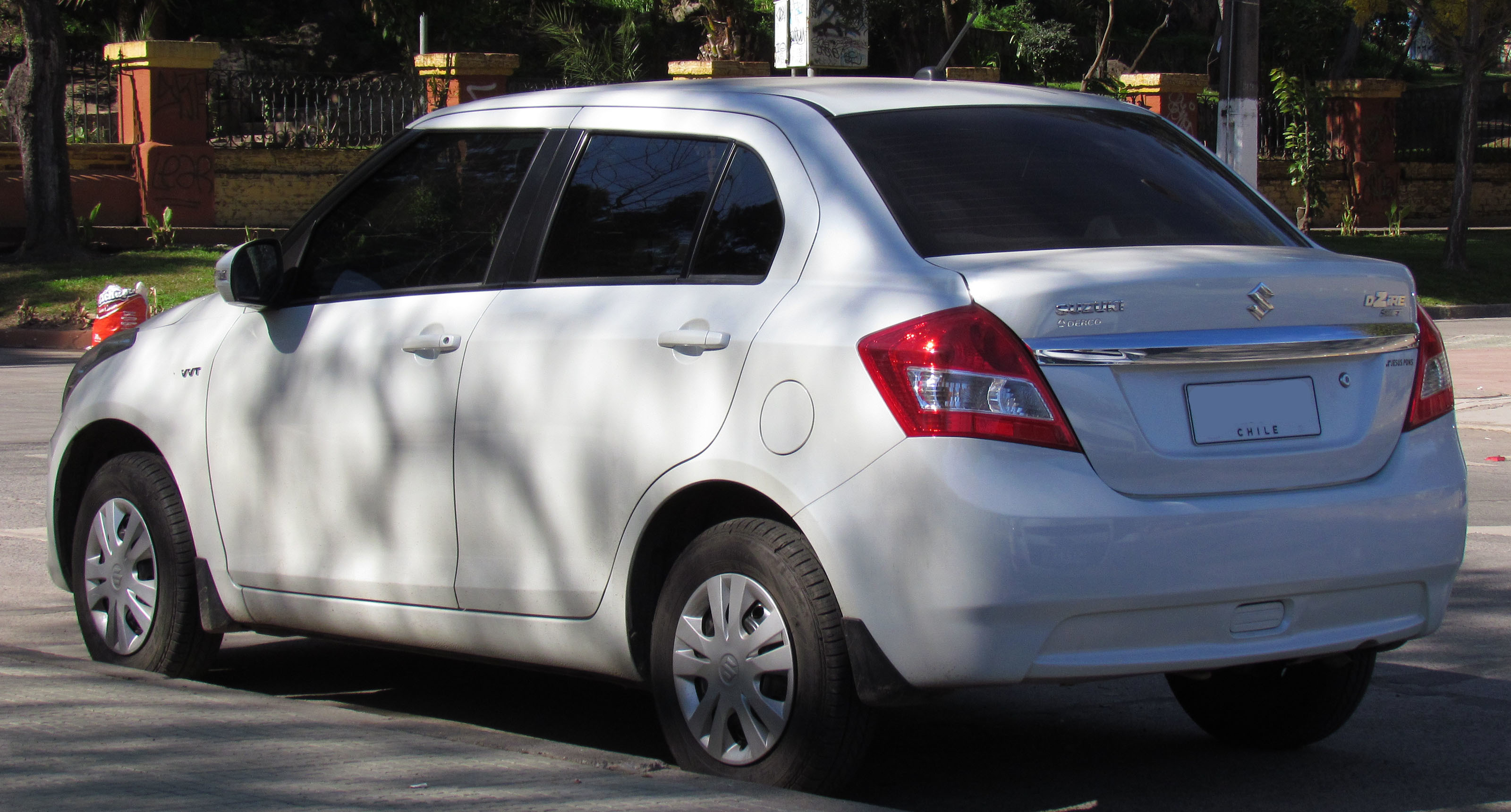
Rear view (pre-facelift)

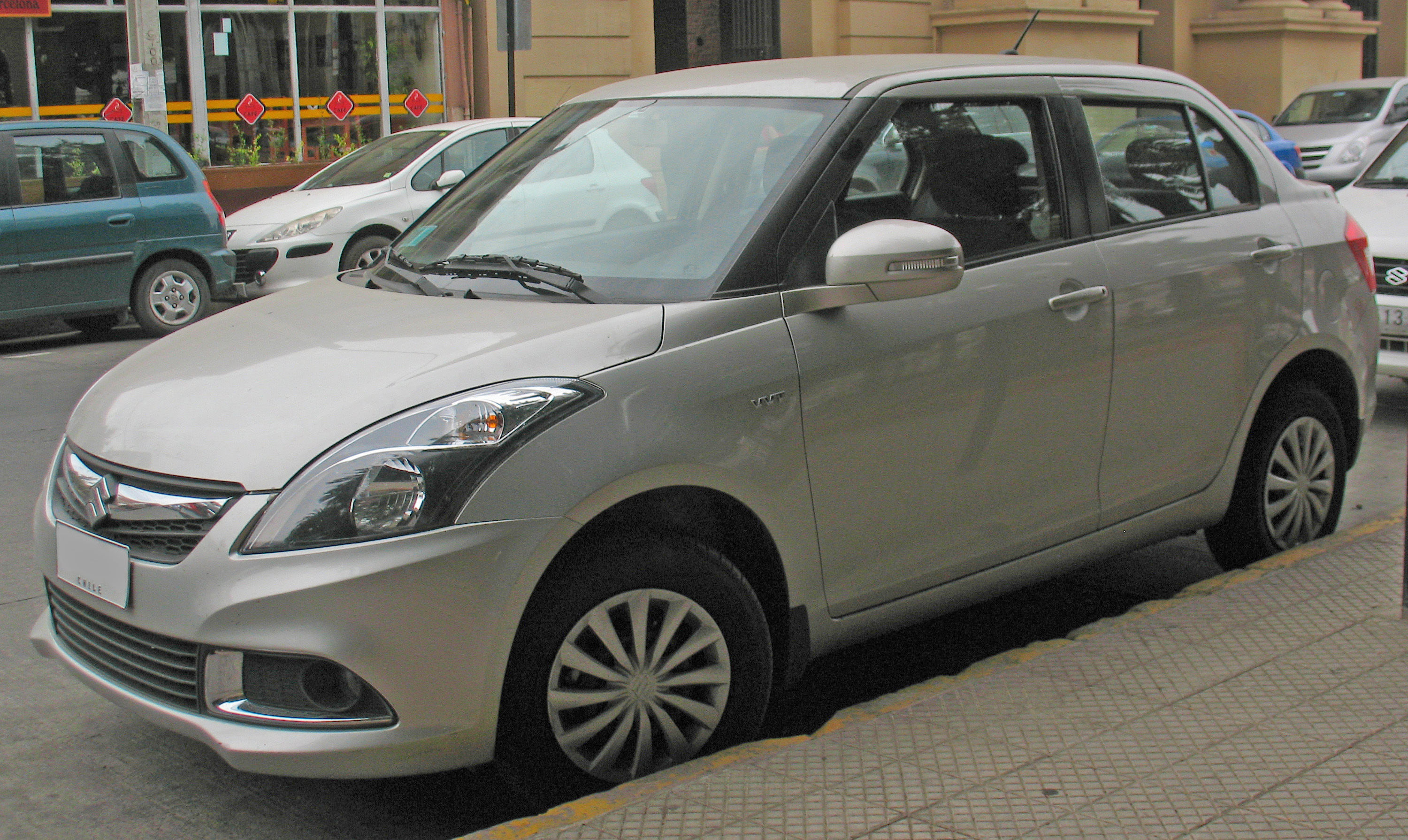

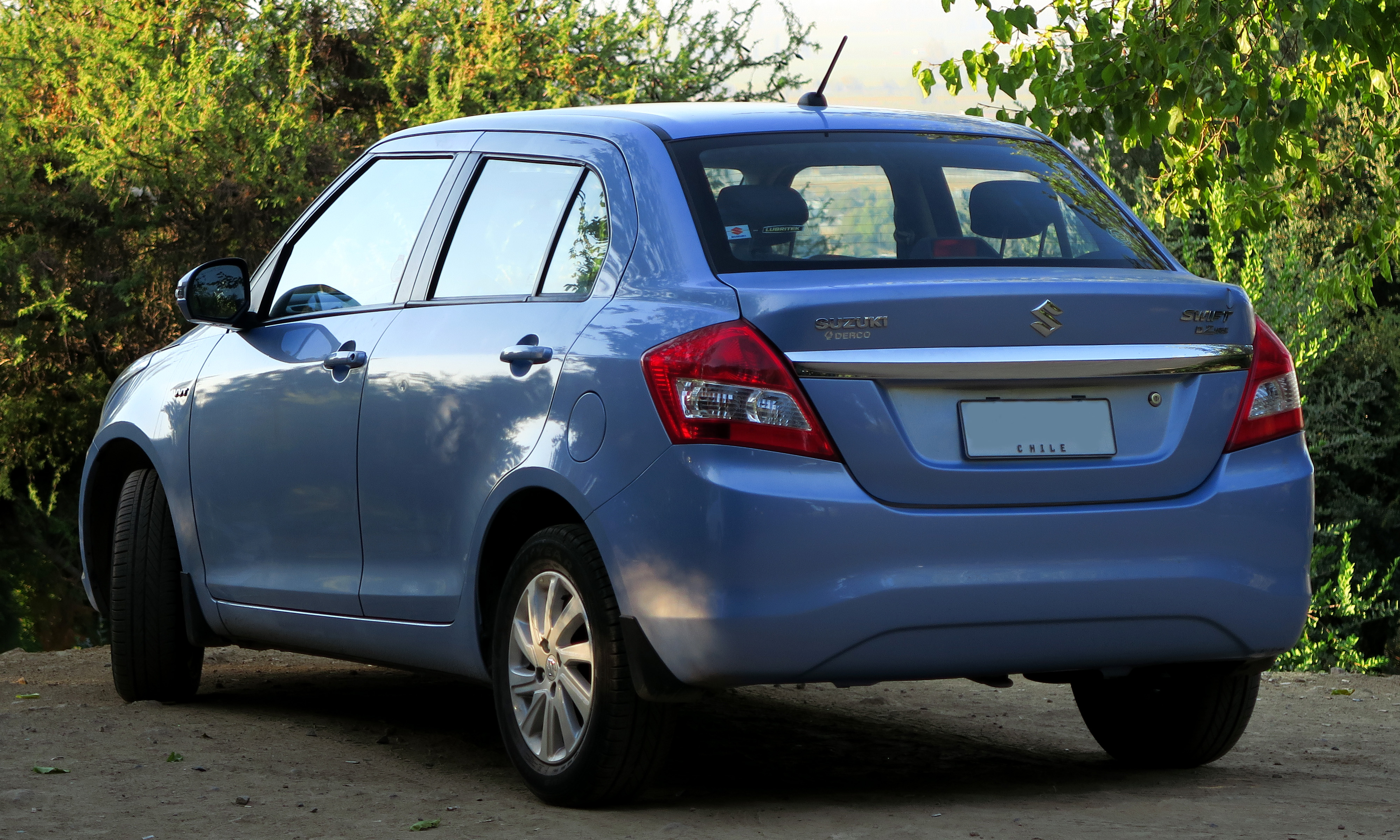
Facelift

The second generation Swift Dzire was based on the second generation Swift hatchback, reducing the overall length to below four meters to qualify for associated tax benefits.

A 1.2 L K-series petrol engine was introduced, and a 1.3 L DDiS turbo-diesel engine. A four-speed automatic transmission option was only available in the VXi trim.

The 2015 revised Swift Dzire was rated as the most fuel efficient diesel car in India.

Maruti Suzuki launched the DZire ZDi with Automatic Gear Shift (AGS) in January 2016. The 5-speed automated manual transmission (AMT) is paired to the 1.3 L DDiS turbodiesel engine.

The second generation Dzire was available in India for fleet operators as the Dzire Tour S until 2023. Initially the 1.3 L turbodiesel engine was also available, but then dropped in April 2020 due the implementation of BS6 emissions standard. Currently only 1.2 L petrol and CNG engine are available, paired with a 5-speed manual transmission.

=== Powertrain ===
Type	Engine	Transmission	Power	Torque
Petrol	1.2 L I4	5-speed manual or 4-speed automatic	83 PS (82 hp) at 6000 rpm	113 N⋅m (83 lb⋅ft) at 4400 rpm
CNG	1.2 L I4	5-speed manual	71 PS (70 hp) at 6000 rpm	95 N⋅m (70 lb⋅ft) at 4000 rpm
Diesel	1.3 L I4	5-speed manual or 5-speed AMT	76 PS (75 hp) at 4000 rpm	190 N⋅m (140 lb⋅ft) at 2000 rpm

== Third generation (2017) ==
Third generation
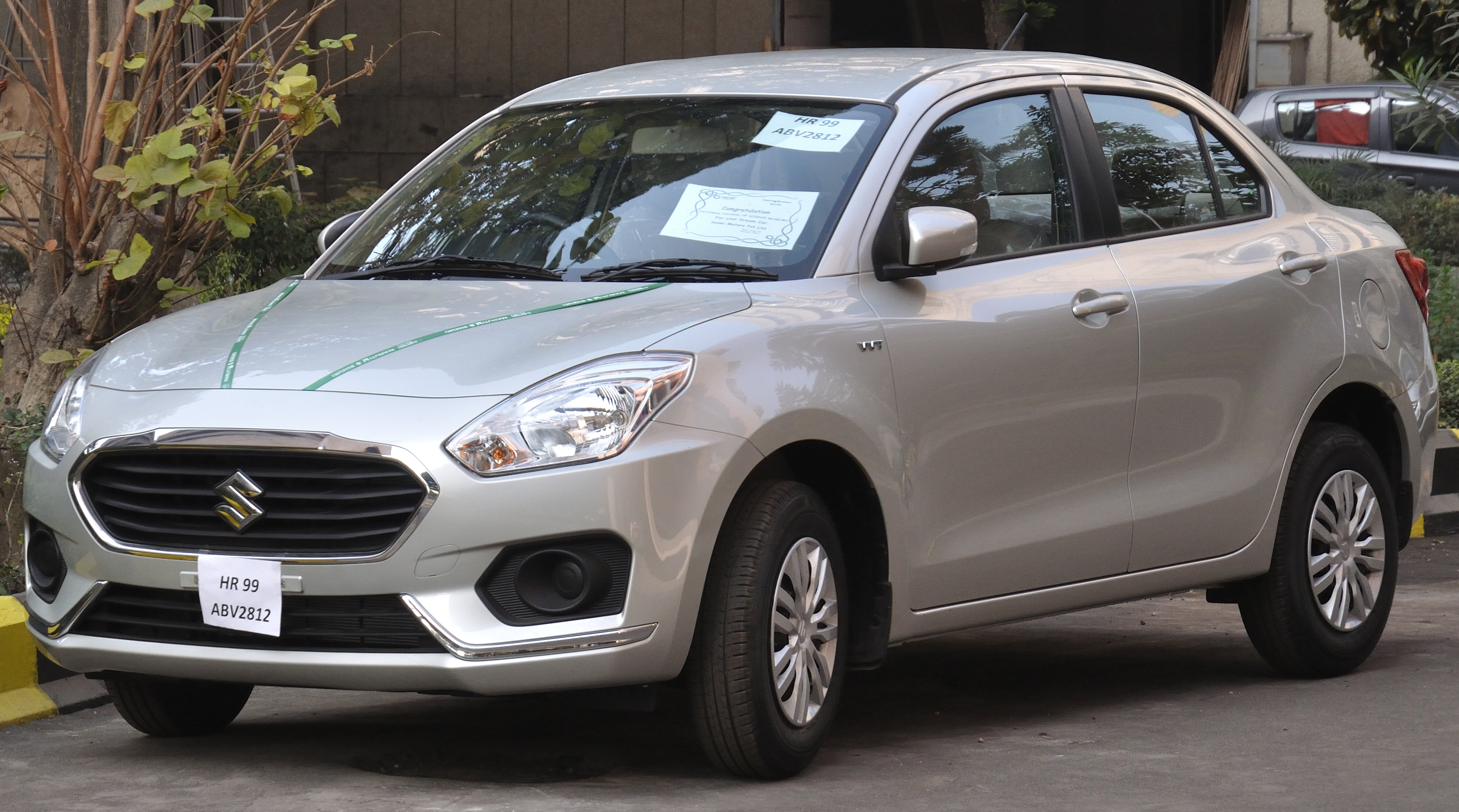
- Pre-facelift Suzuki Dzire

Overview
- Production: 2017–2024; 2023–2025 (Dzire Tour S)
- Assembly: India: Manesar, Haryana (Maruti Suzuki); Ahmedabad (Suzuki Motor Gujarat)

Body and chassis
- Platform: HEARTECT B platform
- Related: Suzuki Baleno (WB); Suzuki Swift (third generation); Suzuki Ertiga (second generation)

Powertrain
- Engine: Petrol: 1.2 L K12M VVT I4; Petrol MHEV/CNG: 1.2 L K12N Dualjet Dual VVT I4; Diesel: 1.3 L D13A DDiS I4 turbo-diesel
- Transmission: 5-speed Aisin manual; 5-speed Aisin-Magneti Marelli AMT "AGS"

Dimensions
- Wheelbase: 2,450 mm (96.5 in)
- Length: 3,995 mm (157.3 in)
- Width: 1,735 mm (68.3 in)
- Height: 1,515 mm (59.6 in)
- Curb weight: 860–915 kg (1,896.0–2,017.2 lb) (Petrol); 955–990 kg (2,105.4–2,182.6 lb) (Diesel); 990–995 kg (2,182.6–2,193.6 lb) (CNG)

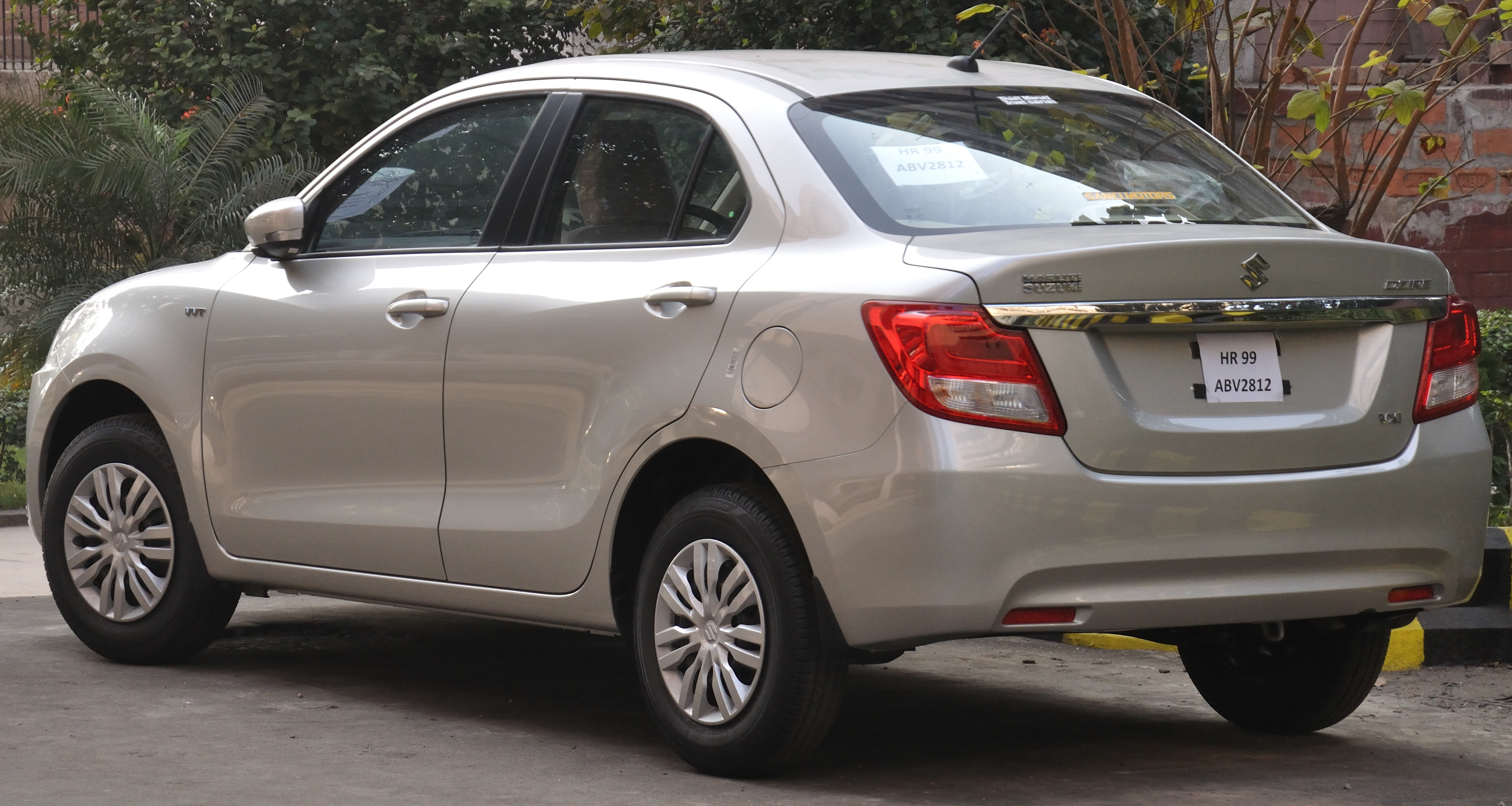
Rear view

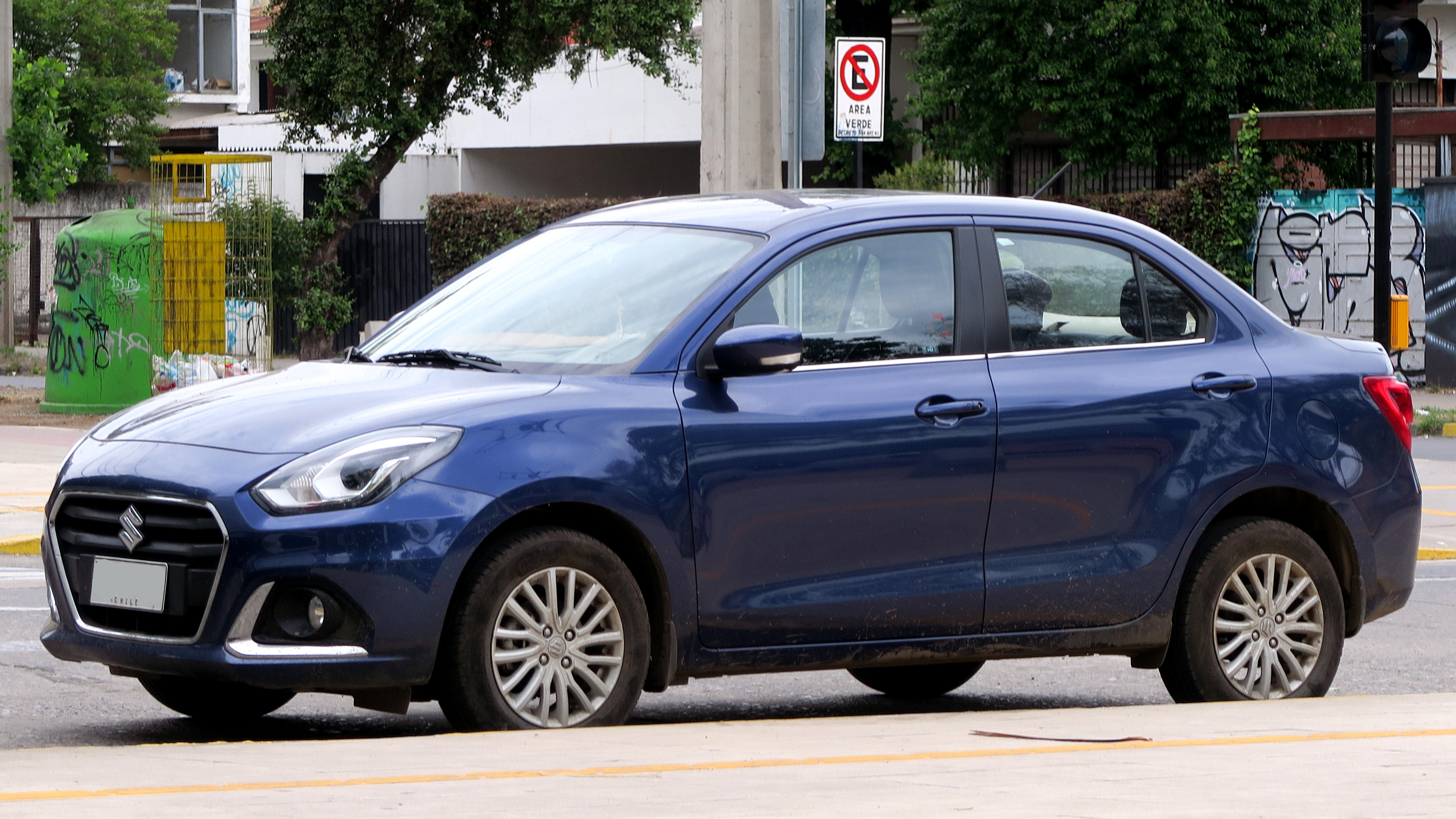
Facelift

Maruti Suzuki launched the third generation Dzire sedan in India on 16 May 2017. The third generation is based on the third generation of the Suzuki Swift. However, for the first time ever, it drops the "Swift" nameplate from its name (except in Colombia and Guatemala where it is marketed as Swift Sedan). The second-generation Dzire continued to be produced and sold exclusively to fleet operators in India, while being rebadged as the Dzire Tour S.

It is built on the HEARTECT platform which uses ultra-high tensile and high tensile steel in its construction, so as to not comprise on structural rigidity. Despite being lighter, Suzuki claims that the vehicle is compliant with frontal and side impact regulations, as well as meets pedestrian safety regulations. The car is also wider and offers increased space for the occupant. Suzuki also claims that the third generation Dzire has 55 mm better rear legroom, as compared to the previous model. Moreover, the boot space has been increased to 378 litres (13.3 cu ft).

It has a completely revised external body design with a special focus on the front section. It has a newly designed large hexagonal grille in the front section flanked by an all-new projector headlamps and a strip of LED DRLs running on the cluster. The body loses its overly bulgy nature and looks cleaner than before.

The engine options on offer at launch include a 1.2 L K12M motor producing 82 bhp (83 PS; 61 kW) and 113 N⋅m (83 lb⋅ft; 12 kg⋅m) of torque, while the diesel gets the 1.3 L D13A DDiS motor with 74 bhp (75 PS; 55 kW) and 190 N⋅m (140 lb⋅ft; 19 kg⋅m) of torque. Both engines can be had with a 5-speed manual or 5-speed AMT. The petrol models is rated 22 km/L (4.5 L/100 km; 62 mpg_{‑imp}; 52 mpg_{‑US}) and the diesel models are rated at 28.40 km/L (3.521 L/100 km; 80.2 mpg_{‑imp}; 66.8 mpg_{‑US}) in the fuel economy department.

Facelifted model appeared in March 2020. Featuring a redesigned front fascia with wider grille; faux wood interior accents; cruise control and VSC (AMT only).

Indian market models featuring a 1.2 L K12N Dualjet petrol engine, replacing petrol and diesel engines. The CNG variant of K12N engine was launched for Indian market in March 2022. The third generation Dzire was available in India for fleet operators as the Dzire Tour S until 2025.

=== Powertrain ===
Type	Engine	Transmission	Power	Torque
Petrol	1.2 L I4	5-speed manual or 5-speed AMT	83 PS (61 kW; 82 hp) at 6000 rpm	113 N⋅m (83 lb⋅ft; 12 kg⋅m) at 4200 rpm
Hybrid	1.2 L I4	5-speed manual or 5-speed AMT	90 PS (66 kW; 89 hp) at 6000 rpm	113 N⋅m (83 lb⋅ft; 12 kg⋅m) at 4000 rpm
CNG	1.2 L I4	5-speed manual	77.5 PS (57 kW; 76 hp) at 6000 rpm	98.5 N⋅m (73 lb⋅ft; 10 kg⋅m) at 4300 rpm
Diesel	1.3 L I4	5-speed manual or 5-speed AMT	76 PS (56 kW; 75 hp) at 4000 rpm	190 N⋅m (140 lb⋅ft; 19 kg⋅m) at 2000 rpm

=== Safety ===
The third generation Maruti Suzuki Dzire for India was rated 2 star adult safety and 2 star child safety by Global NCAP 2.0 in 2024 (similar to Latin NCAP 2016).

Global NCAP 2.0 test results (India) Maruti Suzuki Old Dzire (2024, similar to Latin NCAP 2016)
Test	Score	Stars
Adult occupant protection	22.22/34.00	2 /5 stars
Child occupant protection	24.45/49.00	2 /5 stars

== Fourth generation (2024) ==
Fourth generation
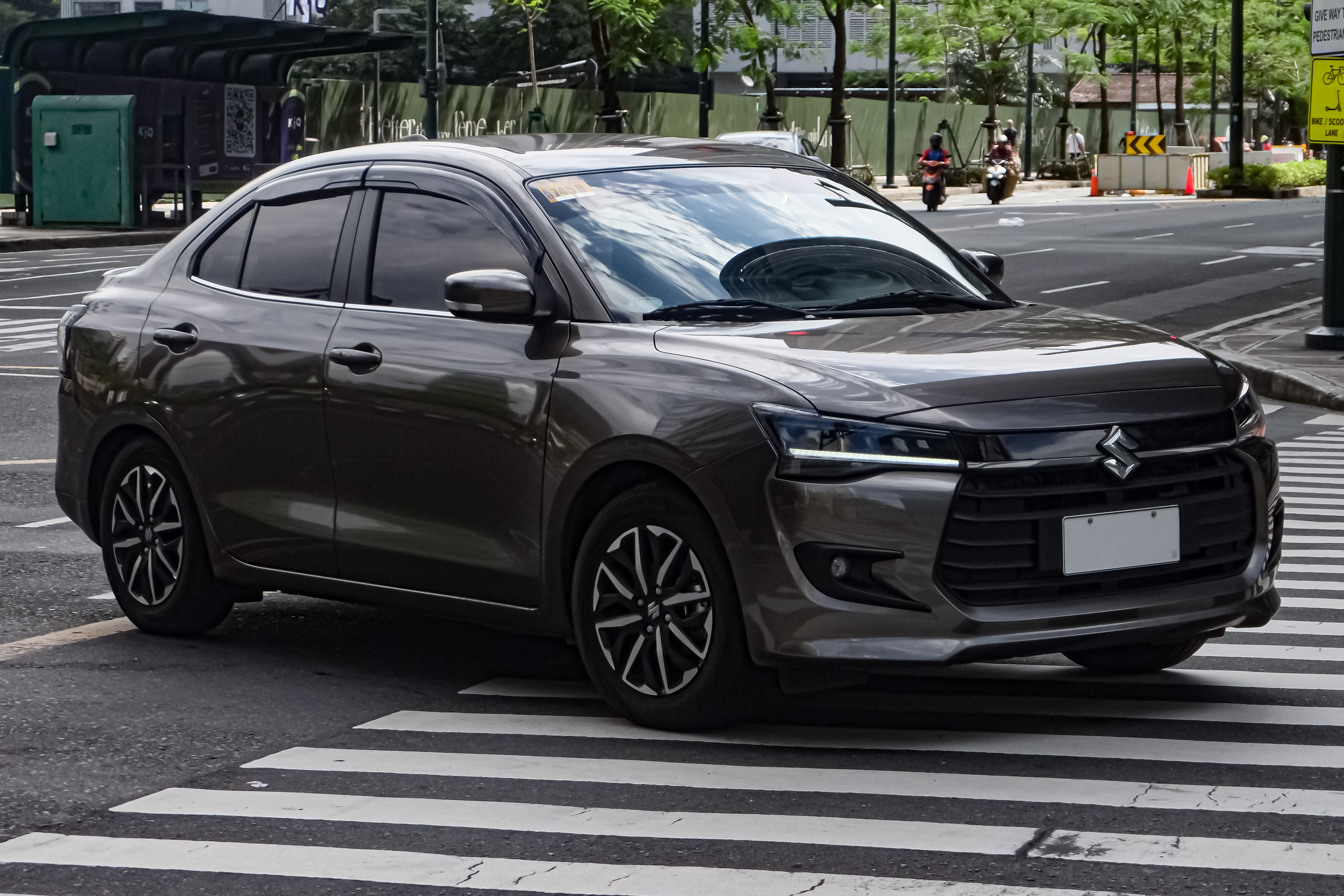
- 2025 Suzuki Dzire GLX Hybrid (Philippines)

Overview
- Production: November 2024 – present March 2025– present (Dzire Tour S)
- Model years: 2025– present
- Assembly: India: Manesar (Maruti Suzuki)

Body and chassis
- Platform: HEARTECT
- Related: Suzuki Baleno; Suzuki Fronx; Suzuki Swift

Powertrain
- Engine: Petrol: 1.2 L Z12E I3 (ZC/ZDDDS); Petrol MHEV: 1.2 L Z12E I3 (ZC/ZDDDS); CNG: 1.2 L Z12E I3
- Transmission: 5-speed manual; 5-speed AMT; CVT

Dimensions
- Wheelbase: 2,450 mm (96 in)
- Length: 3,995 mm (157.3 in)
- Width: 1,735 mm (68.3 in)
- Height: 1,525 mm (60.0 in)
- Curb weight: 920–1,025 kg (2,028.3–2,259.7 lb)

The fourth generation Dzire was launched on 11 November 2024. The Dzire is primarily marketed in India with planned exports to African, ASEAN, Middle Eastern and Latin American markets.

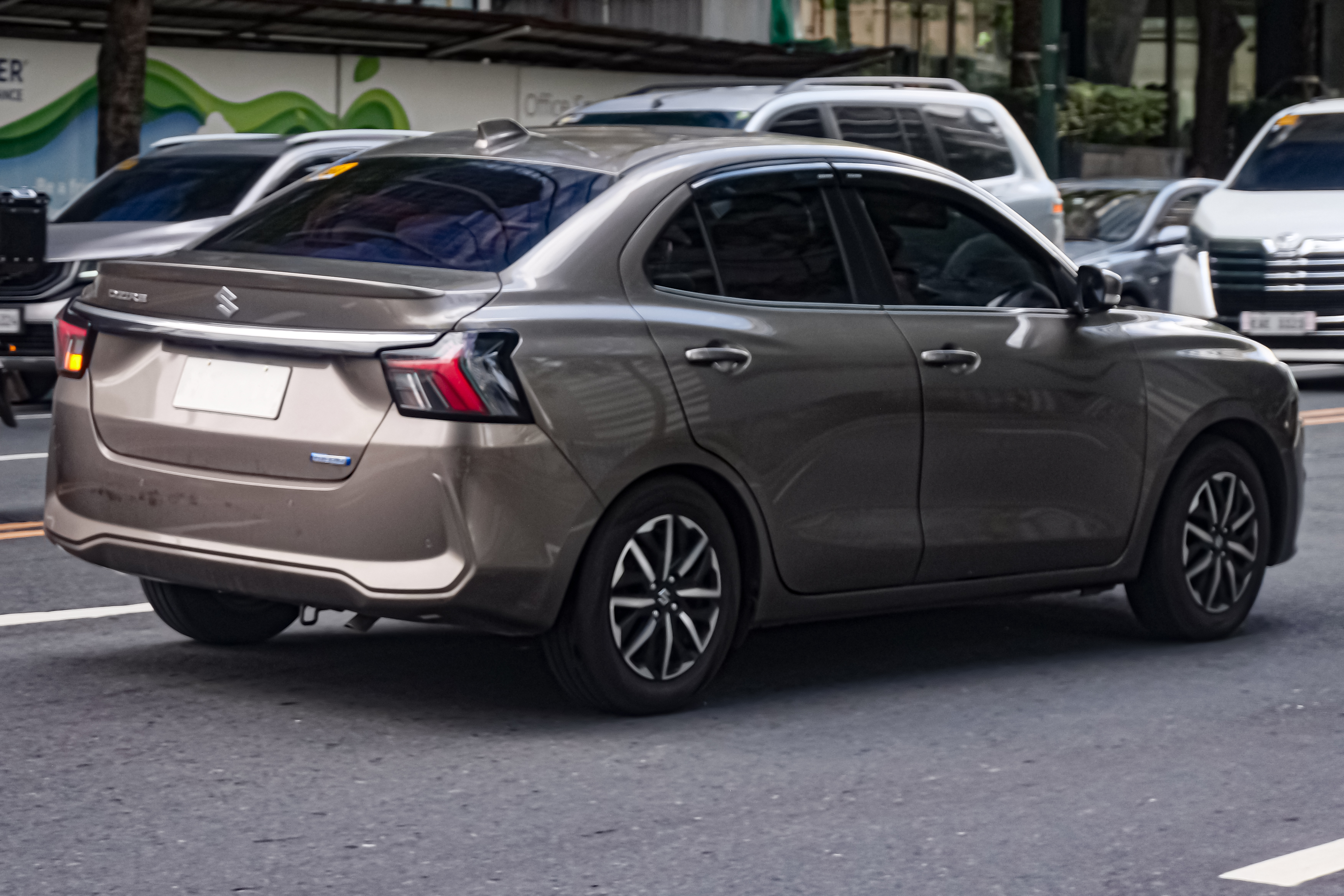
Rear view

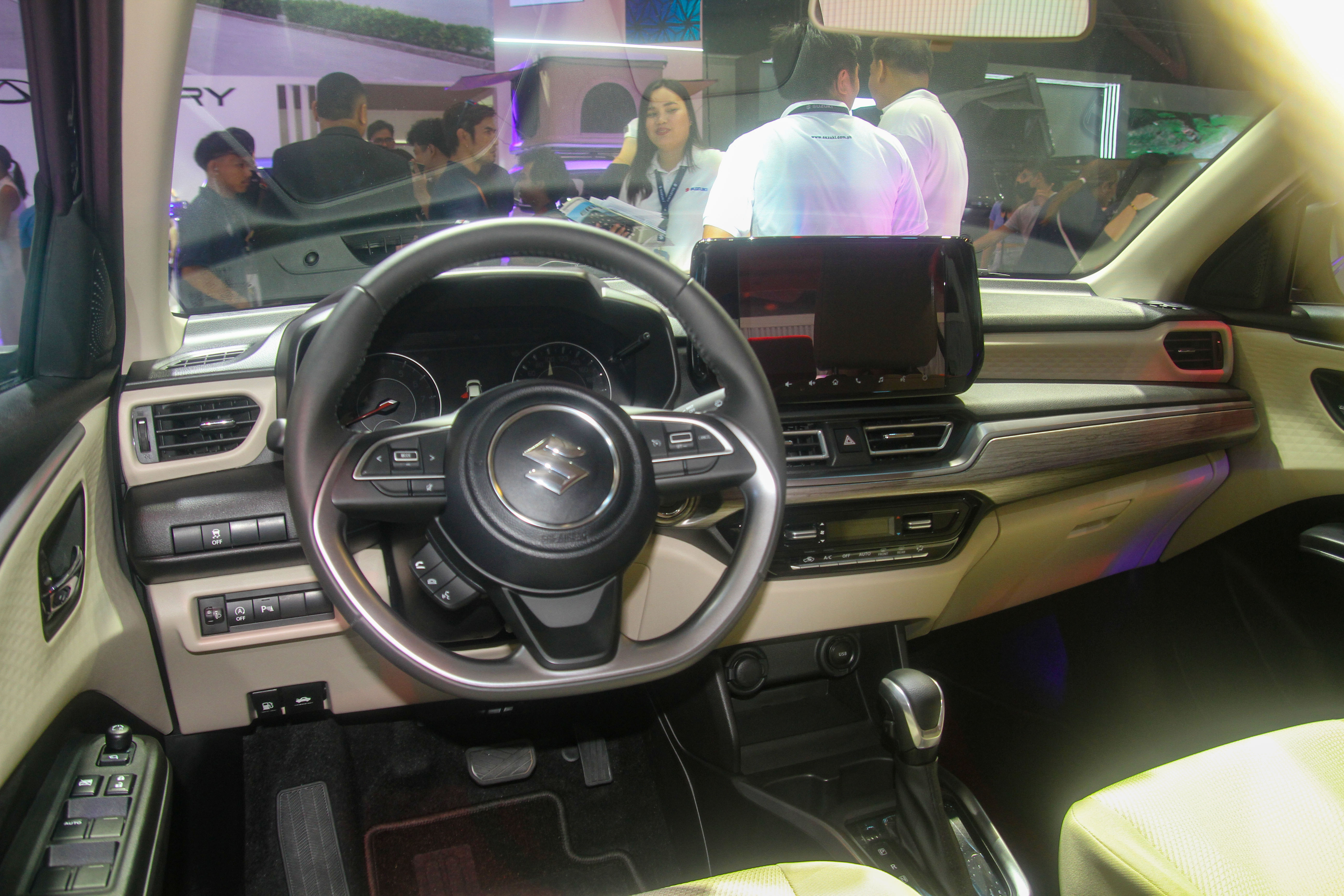
Interior

=== Markets ===
==== India ====
In India, the Dzire was available in four trim variants: LXi, VXi, ZXi and ZXi+. For engines, it is available with a Z12E 1.2-litre petrol engine paired with five-speed manual and AMT transmissions or a compressed natural gas version.

==== Laos ====
The Dzire was launched in Laos on 16 May 2025. It is available in the sole GLX trim, powered by a 1.2-litre petrol engine with a mild hybrid system paired with a continuously variable transmission.

==== Middle East ====
The Dzire was launched in the Middle East on 12 April 2025. It is available in two trim levels: GL and GLX, both powered by a 1.2-litre petrol engine paired with a continuously variable transmission.

==== Philippines ====
The Dzire was launched in the Philippines at the 2025 Manila International Auto Show on 11 April 2025. It is available in two variants: GL and GLX, both powered by a 1.2-litre petrol engine with a mild hybrid system paired with a continuously variable transmission.

==== South Africa ====
The Dzire was launched in South Africa on 12 May 2025. It is available in two trim levels: GA and GL+, both powered by a 1.2-litre petrol engine paired either a 5-speed manual or a continuously variable transmission.

=== Powertrain ===
Type	Engine	Transmission	Power	Torque	ref.
Petrol	1.2 L I3	5-speed manual or 5-speed AMT	82 PS (81 hp) at 5700 rpm	112 N⋅m (83 lb⋅ft) at 4300 rpm	
CNG	1.2 L I3	5-speed manual	70 PS (69 hp) at 5700 rpm	102 N⋅m (75 lb⋅ft) at 2900 rpm	

=== Safety ===
The Dzire has been rated 5 stars by Bharat NCAP (similar to Latin NCAP 2016),

Bharat NCAP test results Maruti Dzire gasoline (2023, based on Latin NCAP 2016)
Test	Score	Stars
Adult occupant protection	29.46/32.00	5 /5 stars
Child occupant protection	41.57/49.00	5 /5 stars

The fourth generation Dzire achieved 5 stars for adult occupant protection from Global NCAP 2.0 in 2024 (similar to Latin NCAP 2016), the first Maruti Suzuki model tested by Global NCAP to do so.

Global NCAP 2.0 test results (India) Maruti Suzuki New Dzire (2024, similar to Latin NCAP 2016)
Test	Score	Stars
Adult occupant protection	31.24/34.00	5 /5 stars
Child occupant protection	39.20/49.00	4 /5 stars

== Sales ==
Maruti Suzuki Dzire has been leading the subcompact segment in India ever since its second generation was introduced. Back in 2015, the company added another feature to its hat by crossing the sales mark of 1 million (10 lakh) sold units in the domestic market. The car has been grossing up a sales number of over 15,000 and close to 20,000 in the 2016–17 period where it has registered more than double the sales number of its competitors like the Honda Amaze, Hyundai Xcent and Tata Zest. In September 2023, the sedan has reached sales milestone of 2.5 million (25 lakh) units in India.

The number of Suzuki vehicles sold in Ethiopia since 2017 has crossed over 25,000 units and Dzire making the most of it.

As of 2025, Dzire became the 1st best-selling model, surpassing the Hyundai Creta.

Year	India
2008	±200,000
2009	±200,000
2010	±200,000
2011	99,515
2012	154,273
2013	198,317
2014	210,882
2015	233,570
2016	202,076
2017	225,043
2018	261,603
2019	209,657
2020	124,969
2021	116,222
2022	159,919
2023	157,522
2024	166,928
2025	214,488

=== Reception ===
In 2015, the Suzuki Dzire won J.D. Power's Most Appealing Entry Mid-size Car and the Most Dependable Mid-size Car.
