= Naurangpur =

Coordinates: 27°10′N 79°47′E

Naurangpur is a village in Gurgaon Mandal, Gurgaon District, Haryana state, India. It is 2.940 km far from the city of Gurgaon and 252 km far from the state capital of Chandigarh. It has a population of about 3602 persons living in around 857 households.

It can be reached from National Highway 8.Situated near sector 78, Gurgaon

== Litigation on land ==
HSIIDC sent notices on 27 August 2004 for acquiring Nakhrola's agricultural lands for essential public needs. Scared farmers sold their lands to the builders but the HSIIDC withdrew the notices after the private players purchased the land. Private builders started buying the land at the rate of Rs.25 lakh per acre. A total of 688 acres of land was bought from three villages Manesar, Nakhrola and Naurangpur. Later the rates were hiked from Rs.25 lakh to Rs.1.5 crore per acre between 25 July and 5 August 2007. The circle rate of agriculture land in May 2014 Manesar is Rs.1.90 crore per acre, while it is Rs.30,000 per square metre in residential zone. However, on 14 May 2014 the Punjab and Haryana High Court has directed builders to compensate Gurgaon farmers on current circle rates for buying over 6oo acres of land.
