= Suzuki Motor Gujarat =

Auto manufacturing plant in India

Maruti Suzuki India Limited, Hansalpur Plant
- Type: Subsidiary of Maruti Suzuki India Limited
- Industry: Automotive
- Founded: 31 March 2014; 12 years ago
- Headquarters: Ahmedabad, Gujarat, India
- Products: Automobiles; Powertrains
- Production output: ≈750,000 (2022)
- Total equity: 126.8 billion rupee
- Owner: Maruti Suzuki (100%)
- Number of employees: 10,000

Maruti Suzuki India Limited, Hansalpur (formerly known as Suzuki Motor Gujarat Private Limited (SMG)) is an automotive manufacturing plant owned by Maruti Suzuki India Limited, located in the Hansalpur Becharaji village of Mandal Taluka in Ahmedabad District.

The plant was opened on 1 February 2017 and has a total annual capacity of 1 million units.

== History ==
SMG was the first and only Suzuki automobile manufacturing plant in India owned directly by Suzuki as a foreign company until 2025, as the other plants are owned by Maruti Suzuki (MSI). The plant supplied vehicles to Maruti Suzuki in the domestic market and to overseas markets.

In 2023, Maruti Suzuki announced plans to purchase the Gujarat plant from SMC in exchange for newly issued shares of MSI. The shareholders approved the proposal in November 2023.

== Facility ==
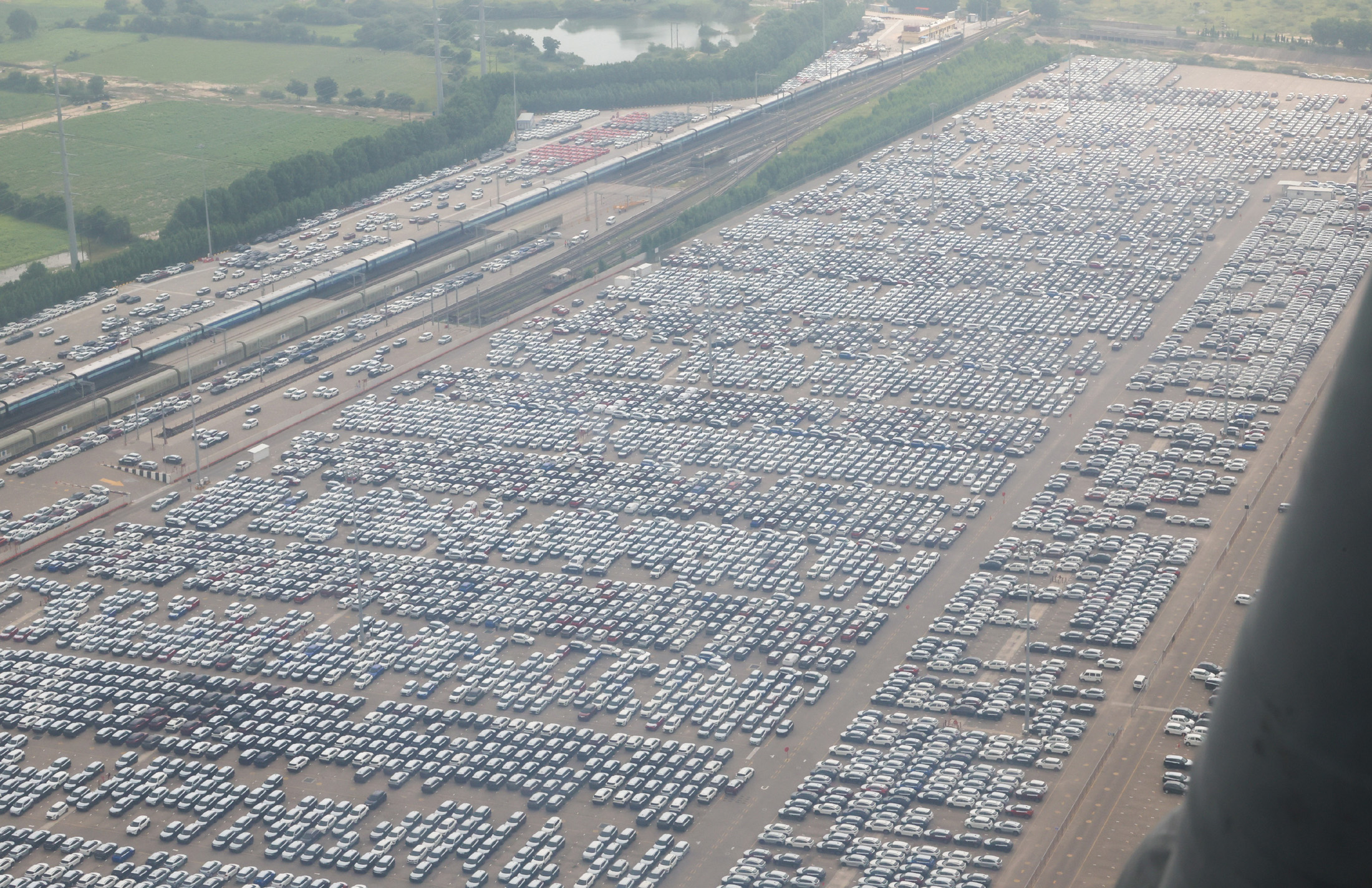
Storage facility of Suzuki Motor Gujarat in 2025

Suzuki Motor Gujarat currently consists of five plants, the Plant A, opened in February 2017, has a total annual capacity of 250,000 and is currently assembling the Baleno. The Plant B was operational in January 2019 has a total vehicle producing capacity of 250,000 and it is currently assembling the Swift. Plant C started production in April 2021 with an annual capacity of 250,000 and is currently assembling the Dzire. The powertrain plant has an annual capacity of producing 500,000 engines and 500,000 powertrains. The fifth plant for electric vehicles was inaugurated in August 2025.

== Milestone ==
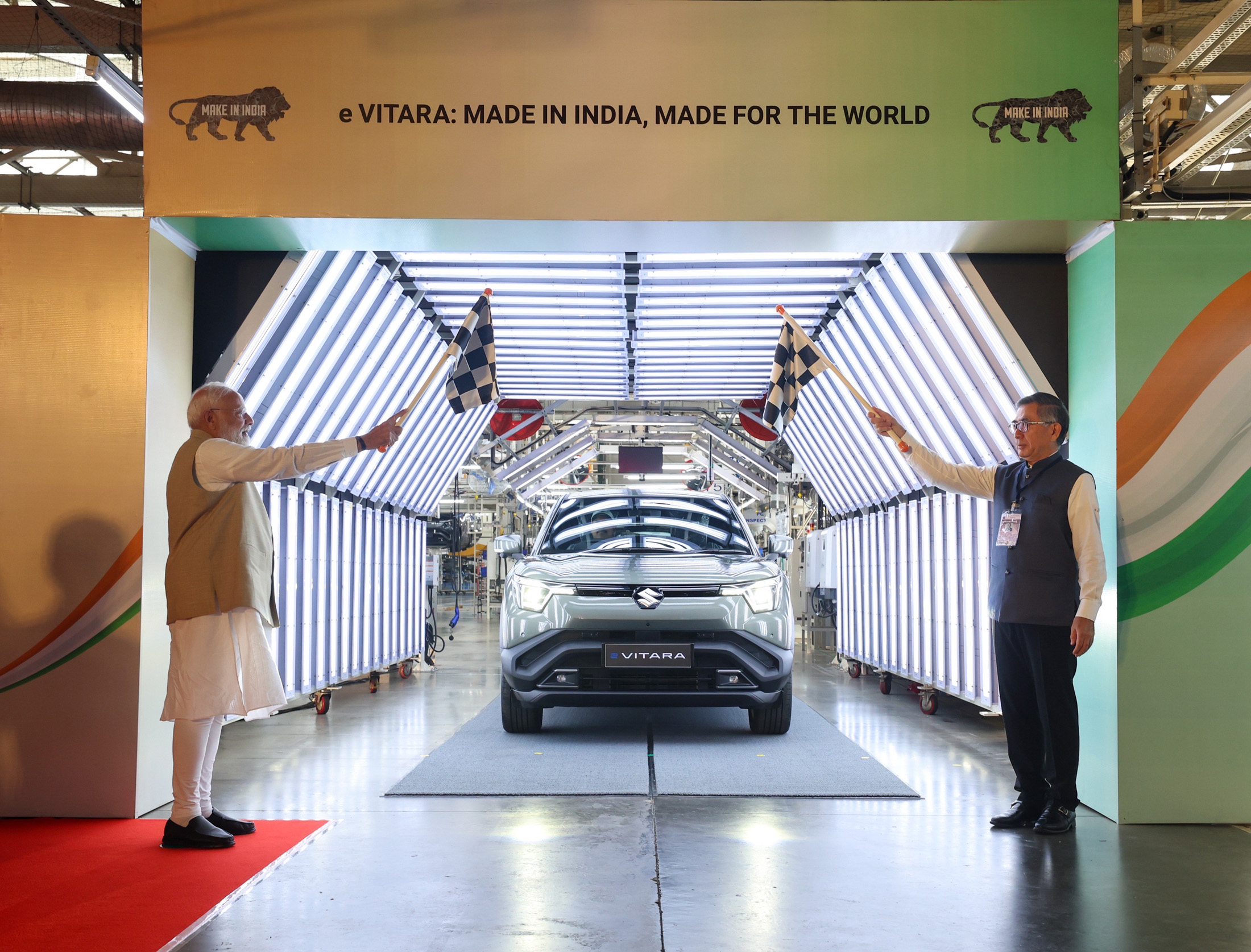
Ceremony of first Suzuki e Vitara production in Suzuki Motor Gujarat

The plant crossed 1 million production mark on 21 October 2020, just 3 years and 9 months since it started production in February 2017. It is the fastest production site of Suzuki to reach the milestone. It crossed production mark of two million units on 20 August 2022. It has achieved this milestone in 5 years and 6 months after having started production in February 2017 and this is the fastest in any Suzuki production plant. The 2 millionth vehicles produced was a Baleno with South African specifications. The plant achieved production milestone of 3 million vehicles in December 2023. The milestone was achieved within a span of around 6 years and 11 months, making it the fastest to manufacture 3 million units across all Suzuki-run facilities. The plant surpassed 4 million vehicles by February 2025.

== Current production ==
- Plant A (February 2017 – present): Suzuki Baleno - 250,000 units/year
- Plant B (January 2019 – present): Suzuki Swift - 250,000 units/year
- Plant C (April 2021 – present): Suzuki Fronx - 250,000 units/year
- EV Plant (August 2025 - present): Suzuki eVitara
- Powertrain plant
  - K12 petrol engine family - 500,000 units/year
  - 5MT and AGS transmissions - 500,000 units/year
