= Jaquar =

Conglomerate based in Manesar, India

Jaquar & Company Private limited
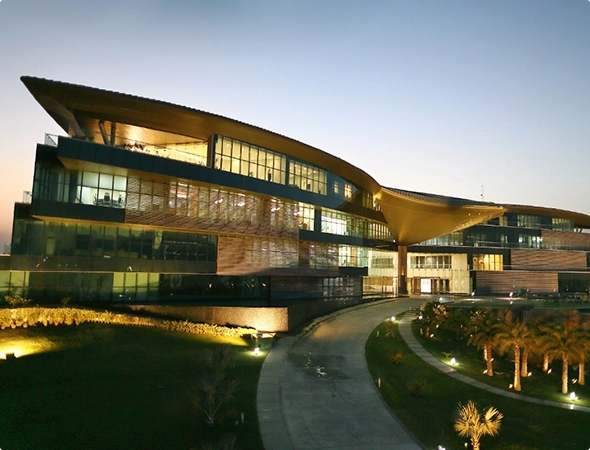
- Jaquar global headquarter, Manesar, Gurugram
- Type: Private
- Founded: 1960
- Founder: N. L. Mehra
- Headquarters: Manesar, Haryana, India
- Area served: Worldwide
- Key people: Rajesh Mehra (Director) Kishan Mehra (Director), Ajay Mehra (Director)
- Products: Bathroom fixtures and lighting
- Revenue: $1 Billion Approx. INR 8703 Crores (2025-26)
- Number of employees: 12000
- Website: https://jaquar.com/int/

The Jaquar Group, established in 1960, is a bathroom and lighting company, offering products such as faucets, ceramics, flushing systems, showers, bathtubs, built-in saunas, fully built bathroom systems, as well as water heaters and varied lighting products.

It employs over 12,000 people including 2400 service technicians and has 7 manufacturing units with 1 in South Korea spread over 3,30,000 sq.m. 3 upcoming manufacturing facilities will make it to 11 facilities up to 5,30,000 sq. m. area. Currently, it manufactures 52.9 million bath fittings every year for nearly 3.6 million bathrooms every year, and 28.4 million lighting products yearly. The existing lighting plant at Bhiwadi, India is spread across 68,000 sq. m. The company has more than 23 Jaquar World orientation centres in India and over 40 Jaquar World experiential showrooms globally at London, Milan, Singapore, Dubai, Kuala Lumpur and other locations. Jaquar Group has global headquarters spread across 48,000 sq. meters) in Manesar, Haryana, India and presently operates in over 55 countries in Europe, Middle East, South East Asia, Africa, and SAARC region. The unique feature of Jaquar’s core industry is that the sales are made not directly to customers but via an extensive dealer network.

== History ==
=== 1960–1985 ===
1960

- Mehras started the business, Rajesh Mehra's father NL Mehra started the bath fittings company and brand Essco.

1972

- Essco started its first manufacturing plant in Haryana, and after three years rolled out a design range of bathroom fittings under the sub-brand Deluxe.

1975

- Launch of Delux, the first designed faucet by Jaquar in India.

1985

- Launch of Marvel, first collection of bathroom fittings from Jaquar in India.

=== 1986–2009 ===
1986

- Rajesh Mehra along with brothers Ajay Mehra and Krishan Mehra launched the Jaquar brand. It is named after Jai Kaur, the grandmother of the Mehra brothers.

1987

- Jaquar launched the advanced flush valve, making Jaquar largest selling brand in its category in India.

1993

- Introduced Victorian design ‘Queen’ brand.

2000

- Expands the range of offerings to whirlpools, shower panels, showers, steam cabins and spas.

2001

- Jaquar's first Orientation Centre opens its doors to the public – a retail place where company's latest bathroom and lighting products and concepts are showcased, and advice from the experts is also offered, in addition to estimation and design assistance. Jaquar is the only Indian bath brand that has live display and demonstration at its 21 Orientation Centers.

2006

- Launch of a separate division for shower enclosures from designing to installation.

2007

- Jaquar builds its first manufacturing fully integrated unit at Bhiwadi.

2008

- Jaquar Group builds its second manufacturing facility.

2009

- Forays into water heaters, the launch of ‘Artize’

=== 2010–till date ===
2010

- The Group introduced a range of sanitaryware products. The third manufacturing plant was scaled up to 135,000 sq. m that becomes one of the largest plant in Asia

2013 Nielsen survey reports Jaquar as India’s most trusted bath fittings brand

2016

- Jaquar Group acquired a 51% majority stake in Joeyforlife—a South Korea-based luxury shower maker—in a deal worth US$1.2 million.
- The company has also entered the lighting industry and has launched a manufacturing unit for the same in Manesar.
- Jaquar makes a new global headquarter, (a Platinum LEED Certified Net zero-energy building by USGBC building in Manesar

2017

- Jaquar acquires sanitaryware manufacturing plant taking its production capacity to 1.8 million pieces.
- Jaquar Group's manufacturing units were spread over 3,29,000 sq. m, across 5 plants in India & 1 plant in South Korea.
- Jaquar expanded its manufacturing facility in Bhiwadi, Rajasthan by 30,000 square meters by investing 150 crore in new faucets manufacturing plant which helped the Group to achieve the production to 1,25,000 faucets a day. With the expansion of Bhiwadi plant it has become the world's largest faucet manufacturing plant in a single unit. Jaquar's Bhiwadi plant recycles 1.5 lakh litres of water every day

2018

- The Group announced the skill development and training of over 300 plumbers on World Youth Skill Day as a part of Skill India, an initiative by Government of India. The training will be imparted to the plumbers through 10 specialized training centres spread across India. The centres will train unemployed youth in specialized skill sets and develop them as trained plumbers.
- The Group closed the turnover of INR 3588 Crores in 2018-19 and aims to achieve $1 billion turnover by 2022 and open 15 stores globally.

2019

- Rajesh Mehra, Director, and Promoter of Jaquar Group was conferred the 'EY Entrepreneur of the Year 2018' Award under the ‘Consumer Products & Retail’ category for Delivering luxurious experiences.
- Jaquar Group received the second Leadership in Energy and Environmental Design (LEED) Platinum certification for its bath fittings manufacturing facility in Bhiwadi, Rajasthan, India.
- Mr. Rajesh Mehra was ranked 93rd in the Forbes India's list of 100 Richest People in 2019 Ranking.
- Jaquar group completed 60 years in manufacturing excellence.

2020

- Jaquar opens the 15th Jaquar World showroom in Moscow that is designed by the Danelon Meroni design studio and showcases product ranges from Artize and Jaquar.
- Opens in-house manufacturing for LED lighting with 900000 sq. ft plant in Bhiwadi.

2021

- Jaquar launches the Sonipat water heater facility with capacity to produce - manual and digital models - 4.5 lakhs pcs in a year.
- Jaquar Group unveiled Jaquar World store in Lagos, Nigeria.

2022

- Jaquar Group launches Laguna in collaboration with Matteo Thun and Antonio Rodrigues
- Launch of ATELIER by Artize, a bath gallery at Mumbai, Delhi and Bangalore.

2023

- Launch of Jaquar World in Dubai.
- Launch of large retail format showroom in Jaipur and plans to open in Indore and Delhi.
- Jaquar successfully asserts rights in ARTIZE mark over Villeroy & Boch.
- Third edition of Canvas, an annual celebration of art, design and architecture, held in collaboration with Architectural Digest.

2024

- Jaquar Group IPA Neerathon 2024 was organized for the cause of water advocating water conservation in New Delhi on 4 February 2024.
- Court restrains a company from using 'Artize' and 'Tiaara' trade marks belonging to Jaquar.
- QLOUD, a thermostatic shower mixer launched for multi-mode showering.

2026

- The 3rd edition of the Jaquar IPA Neerathon - Run for Water, a large-scale water awareness festival, inspired by the vision of Hon'ble Prime Minister Narendra Modi, on water conservation was concluded on April 19, 2026.

== Legacy & Philosophy ==
Jaquar group's commemorative tributes describe their founder Late Shri. N. L. Mehra (19 December 1925 – 19 May 2009) leadership philosophy as being rooted in trust, fairness, self-reliance, and long-term relationship building. According to Jaquar Group, Mehra emphasized product quality, customer service, dignity of labour, and ethical business conduct as core organizational principles. These values were later presented by the company as foundational elements of its corporate culture and expansion strategy.

Following his death in 2009, company communications continued to portray Mehra's influence as extending beyond entrepreneurship to institution-building, particularly through his emphasis on trust-based relationships with employees, distributors, and customers. Internal commemorations have credited him with fostering a values-driven management approach that remained influential in the group's subsequent growth and international expansion.

== Products ==
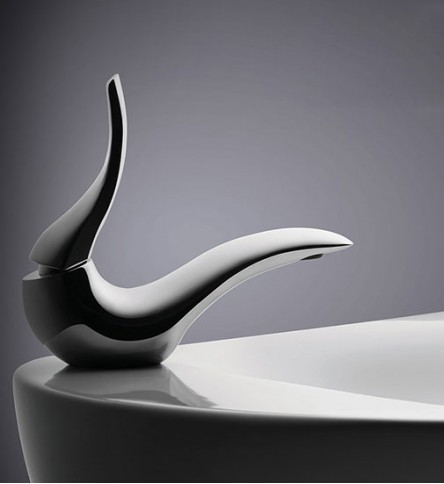
Artize Tailwater Faucet

All manufacturing plants are zero liquid discharge with recycling more than 500,000 litres of water everyday and recycling 4221 metric tones of brass every year, generating 6.23 MW of solar energy.Jaquar Group targets its products to various socio-economic segments, such as brand Artize (luxury category), brand Jaquar (Premium category) and brand Essco (value category).

== Artize ==
Artize is a luxury bathroom shower and faucets brand from Jaquar Group. In July 2018, the Tailwater faucet, manufactured by the Jaquar Group's luxury brand Artize, and designed by the London-based product design consultancy DanelonMeroni Design Studio received Red Dot Design Award for 2018 for product design.

Jaquar successfully asserts rights in ARTIZE mark over Villeroy & Boch.

== Jaquar ==
The Jaquar brand is a player in the premium segment of the Indian bathroom fittings market. It manufactures shower enclosures and cubicles. The company's range of products also includes faucets, showers, sanitary ware and wellness, shower enclosures, and water heaters. QLOUD, a thermostatic shower mixer launched for multi-mode showering with Sobhita Dhulipala featuring in advertisement campaign.

=== Faucets ===
Jaquar has in-house product design team, the Group has manufacturing capacity of producing 125,000 faucets per day.

=== Showers ===
Jaquar showers have overhead, hand and body showers systems.

=== Sanitaryware ===
Jaquar Sanitaryware ranges include wash basins, offering Wall Hung, Over Counter, Under Counter and Counter-top installations.

=== Wellness ===
Jaquar has range of whirlpools that are created by specialist designers from Europe and are manufactured at Jaquar’s manufacturing facilities.

== Essco ==
Under the Jaquar Group Essco offers taps, sanitaryware, and accessories, and has had a retail footprint of over 4000 in the country and an annual turnover of over Rs 300 crores. For over six decades,Essco has been in the bath industry in India. Essco's core mission centers on delivering and designing affordable, quality products for consummers. Essco has expanded its footprint in tier-II, III & IV cities across India. Essco has a total retail presence across 4000+ stores and the Jaquar Group aims to increase the retail strength to 5000+ outlets by the year 2022. Essco unveiled digital campaign Hashtag EsscoNaBhoolPaoge highlighting the values of quality and trusted service.

== Jaquar lighting ==
The group is investing Rs 150 crore in a new lighting manufacturing facility where many lighting components would be produced in-house. Jaquar's capacity to make LED drivers is about 1.2 million a month. It currently produces around 750,000. The company first invested in lighting 15 years back when it identified a vacuum in good quality lighting. Since then, it has focussed on designer lighting such as chandeliers. The company also manufactures bulbs and tube lights - it has automated bulbs assembly at its factory in Manesar. Jaquar Group announced the Indian film actress Deepika Padukone as the brand ambassador of their lighting segment.

== Smart home and connected products ==
Jaquar has expanded into connected lighting and bathroom technologies, offering smart home enabled products including digital shower systems, app-controlled water heaters, touchless faucets, sensor-operated sanitary fittings, intelligent thermostatic mixers, and high-efficiency intelligent toilets. These products are designed to integrate convenience, water conservation and energy management through digital interfaces and home automation platforms.

== Quality ==
The company has deliberately moved away from price-led competition and invested heavily in design, technology, R&D, and state-of-the-art manufacturing processes.

== Training ==
Jaquar Group aims to train over 10,000 more plumbers by 2020.

Group's existing plumber training and customer service initiative; 63,000 plumbers have been trained through PAD (Plumber Associated with Dealers) and 2,000 unskilled personnel have been trained through Jaquar Group skill development centres.
