= Nakhrola =

Coordinates: 28°00′N 77°25′E

Nakhrola is a village in the Gurgaon mandal, of Gurgaon District in the state of Haryana in India. It is an Ahir majority village . The population of Nakhrola is 6000 people and it is an agricultural area.

== Litigation on land ==
HSIIDC sent notices on 27 August 2004 for acquiring Nakhrola's agricultural lands for essential public needs. Scared farmers sold their lands to the builders, but the HSIIDC withdrew the notices after the private players purchased the land. Private builders started buying the land at the rate of Rs.25 lakh per acre. A total of 688 acres of land was bought from three villages Manesar, Nakhrola and Naurangpur. Later the rates were hiked from Rs.25 lakh to Rs.1.5 crore per acre between 25 July and 5 August 2007. The circle rate of agriculture land in Manesar in May 2014 was Rs.1.90 crore per acre, while it was Rs.30,000 per square metre in residential zone. However, on 14 May 2014 the Punjab and Haryana High Court directed builders to compensate Gurgaon farmers on current circle rates for buying over 600 acres of land.
