= Suzuki e Vitara =

Battery electric subcompact crossover SUV

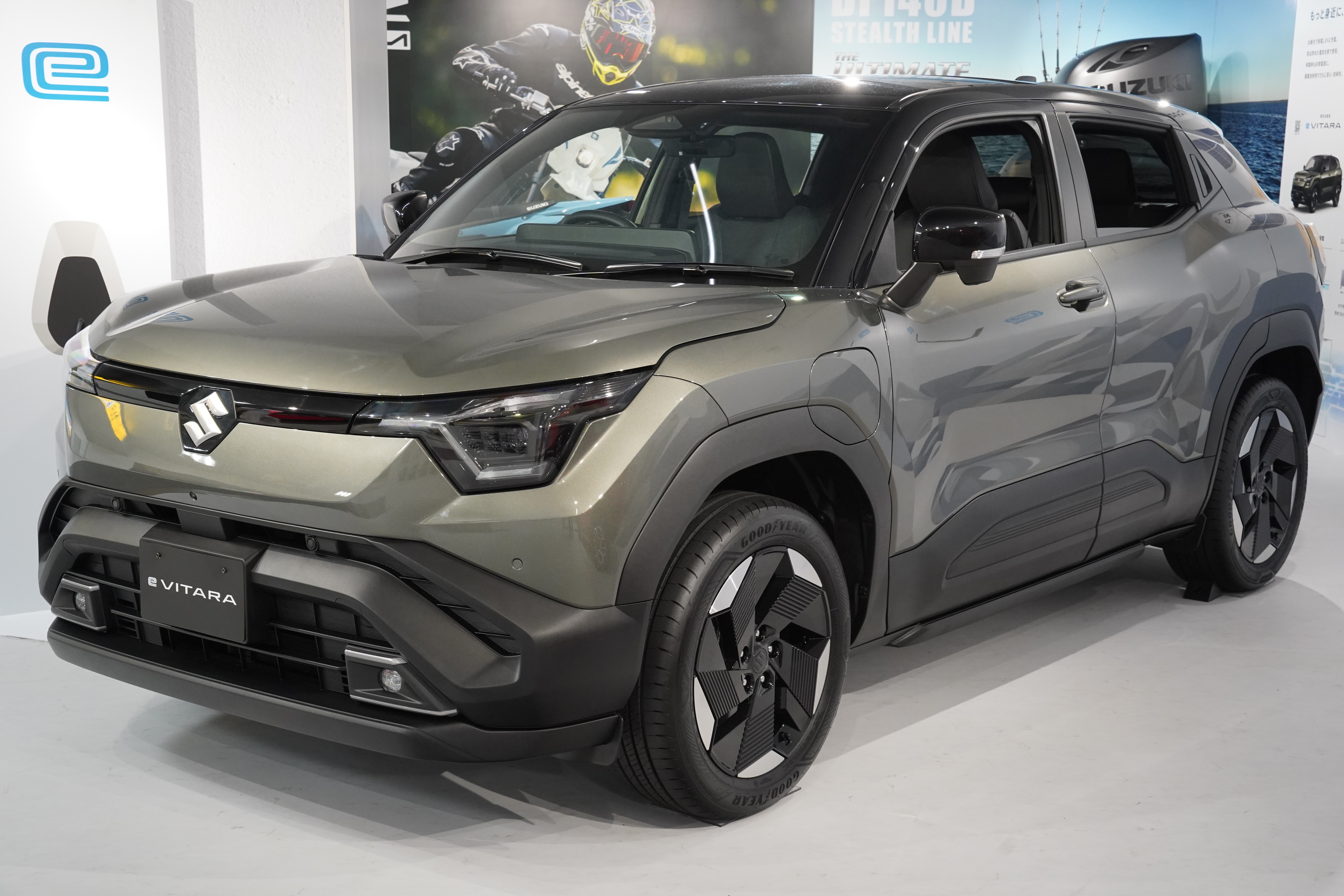

Overview
- Manufacturer: Suzuki
- Model code: PA2AS/PC2AS (FWD); PB3AS (4WD)
- Also called: Toyota Urban Cruiser; Toyota Urban Cruiser Ebella (India)
- Production: August 2025 – present
- Assembly: India: Ahmedabad, Gujarat (Suzuki Motor Gujarat)
- Designer: Kimitoshi Sato (exterior); Takashi Hayashida (interior)

Body and chassis
- Class: Subcompact crossover SUV (B)
- Body style: 5-door SUV
- Layout: Front-motor, front-wheel-drive; Dual-motor, all-wheel-drive
- Platform: Heartect-e

Powertrain
- Electric motor: Permanent magnet synchronous
- Power output: 106 kW (142 hp; 144 PS); 128 kW (172 hp; 174 PS); 135 kW (181 hp; 184 PS) (AWD)
- Battery: 49 kWh LFP (FinDreams, Tata Gotion, TDS Lithium-ion Battery Gujarat, and ELIIY Power); 61 kWh LFP (FinDreams, Tata Gotion, TDS Lithium-ion Battery Gujarat, and ELIIY Power)

Dimensions
- Wheelbase: 2,700 mm (106.3 in)
- Length: 4,275 mm (168.3 in); 4,285 mm (168.7 in) (Urban Cruiser)
- Width: 1,800 mm (70.9 in)
- Height: 1,635 mm (64.4 in)
- Kerb weight: 1,702–1,899 kg (3,752–4,187 lb)

The Suzuki e Vitara (Japanese: スズキ・eビターラ, Hepburn: Suzuki Ebitāra) is a battery electric subcompact crossover SUV (B-segment) produced by Japanese manufacturer Suzuki, utilising the Vitara nameplate. Introduced in November 2024, it is the first mass-produced battery electric vehicle ever produced by the company. It is also marketed by Toyota with modified styling as the Toyota Urban Cruiser.

== History and production ==
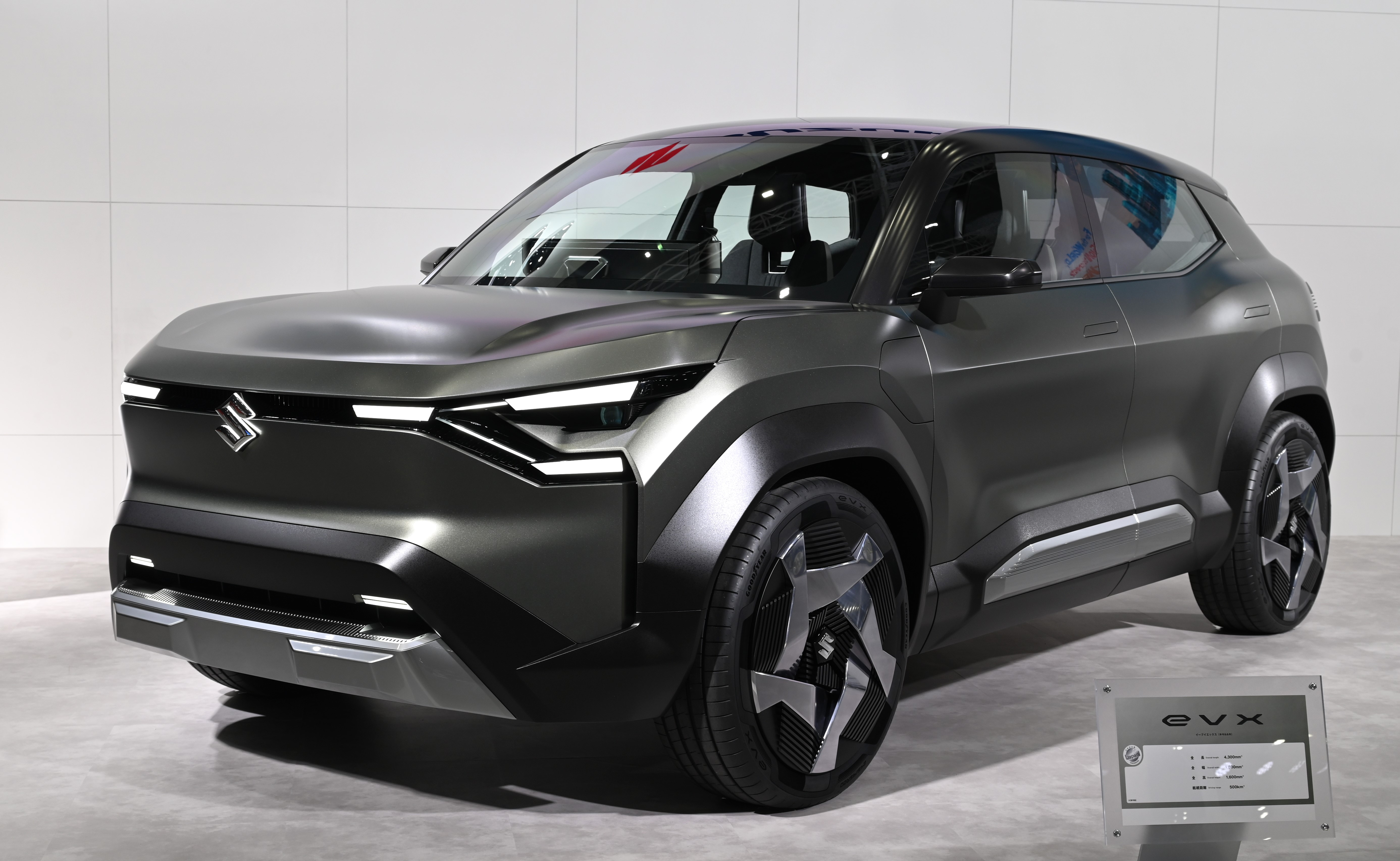
Suzuki eVX concept car, which previewed the design of e Vitara

Suzuki introduced the e Vitara on 4 November 2024, in Milan, Italy. The vehicle was previewed by the Suzuki eVX concept, which was first showcased at the Auto Expo in India in January 2023. The Toyota version, the Toyota Urban Cruiser was introduced on 12 December 2024. The styling of the Urban Cruiser was previewed by the Toyota Urban SUV Concept shown in December 2023 in Europe.

== Specifications ==
The e Vitara is claimed to be developed on the Heartect-e electric vehicle "skateboard" platform, developed to provide increased structural integrity and a lowered centre of gravity. Two battery options are available: a 49 kWh battery pack delivering 106 kW (142 hp; 144 PS) and a 61 kWh battery pack producing 128 kW (172 hp; 174 PS). These battery packs utilise lithium iron phosphate (LFP) blade cells produced by BYD and Tata. The top variant of the e Vitara is equipped with the AllGrip-e all-wheel-drive system, offering 135 kW (181 hp; 184 PS) and 300 N⋅m (30.6 kg⋅m; 221 lb⋅ft) of torque, with adaptable drive modes tailored for various driving conditions. The eAxle technology, created in collaboration with Toyota, is integrated into the platform.

== Markets ==
The e Vitara is manufactured at Suzuki Motor Gujarat facility in Gujarat, India, with around 50 percent of its production output designated for export to European and other global markets.

=== Europe ===
The e Vitara was released in Europe in September 2025, with deliveries commenced in the same month.

The Urban Cruiser was released in Europe in December 2025, with deliveries commenced in the first quarter of 2026.

=== Asia ===
==== Brunei ====
The Urban Cruiser was launched in Brunei on 4 September 2026.

==== India ====
The e Vitara was launched in India on 17 February 2026. It is available with three trim levels: Delta (49 kWh), Zeta and Alpha (61 kWh).

The Urban Cruiser Ebella was launched in India on 29 May 2026, with three trim levels: E1 (49 kWh), E2 and E3 (61 kWh).

==== Indonesia ====
The Urban Cruiser was launched in Indonesia on 21 November 2025, followed by the e Vitara on 5 February 2026.

==== Japan ====
The e Vitara was launched in Japan on 16 January 2026. It is available with three variants: X 2WD (49 kWh), Z 2WD and Z 4WD (61 kWh).

==== Malaysia ====
The Urban Cruiser was launched in Malaysia on 2 April 2026, followed by the e Vitara on 26 June 2026.

==== Philippines ====
The Urban Cruiser was launched in the Philippines on 17 March 2026, followed by the e Vitara on 4 June 2026.

==== Singapore ====
The e Vitara was launched at Singapore Motorshow in January 2026 and was later available from the official distributor in one variant, 49 kWh.

== Safety ==
Euro NCAP test results Suzuki e Vitara 61kWh GLX (LHD) (2025)
Test	Points	%
Overall:	4 /5 stars	
Adult occupant:	31.0	77%
Child occupant:	42.0	85%
Pedestrian:	50.3	79%
Safety assist:	13	72%

Bharat NCAP test results Maruti Suzuki E-Vitara (2026, based on Latin NCAP 2016)
Test	Score	Stars
Adult occupant protection	31.48/32.00	5 /5 stars
Child occupant protection	43.00/49.00	5 /5 stars

ANCAP test results Suzuki e Vitara (2025, aligned with Euro NCAP)
Test	Points	%
Overall:	4 /5 stars	
Adult occupant:	31.00	77%
Child occupant:	43.00	83%
Pedestrian:	50.34	79%
Safety assist:	12.78	71%

== Gallery ==
=== Suzuki e Vitara ===
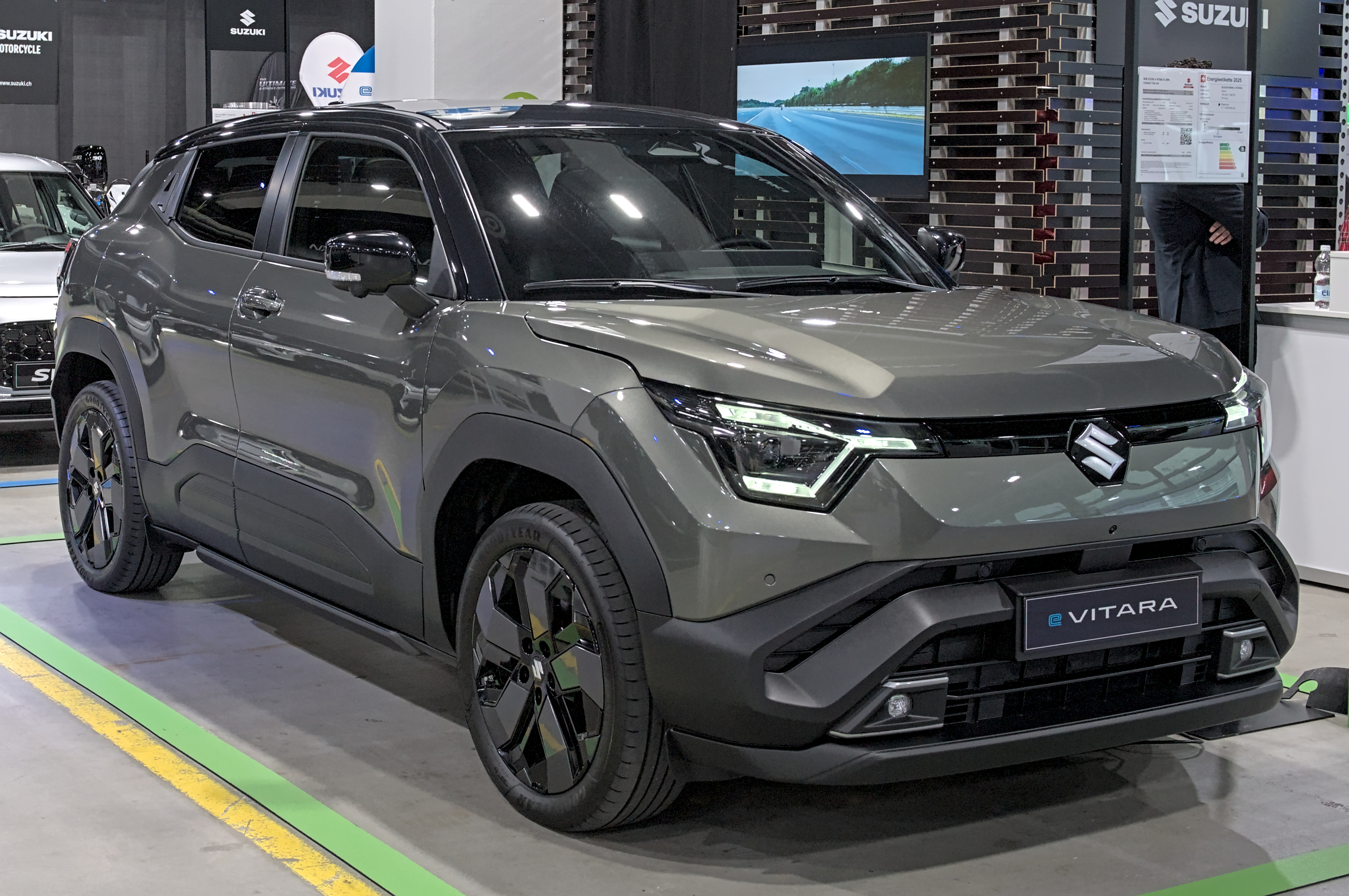
Suzuki e Vitara

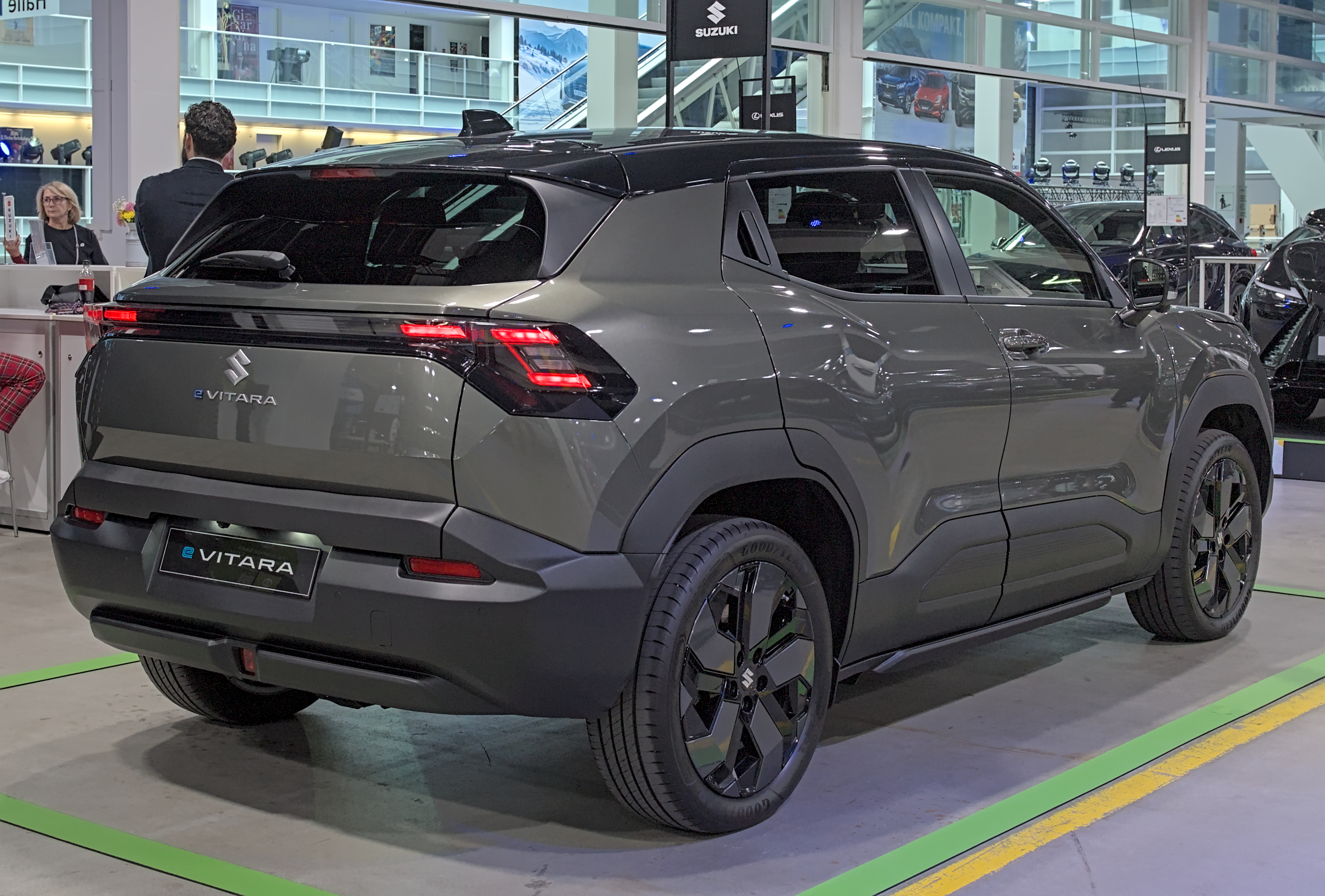
Rear view

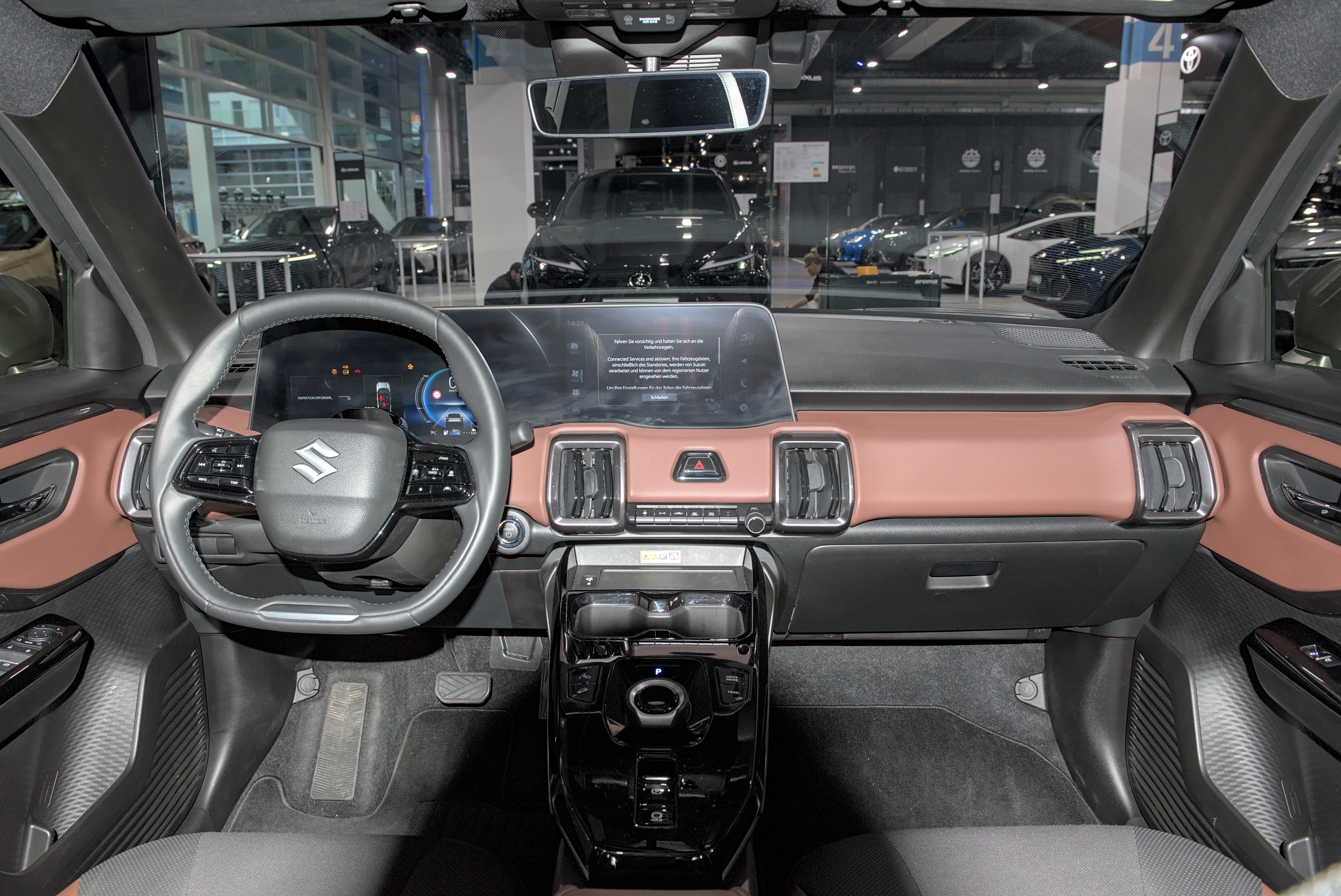
Interior

=== Toyota Urban Cruiser ===
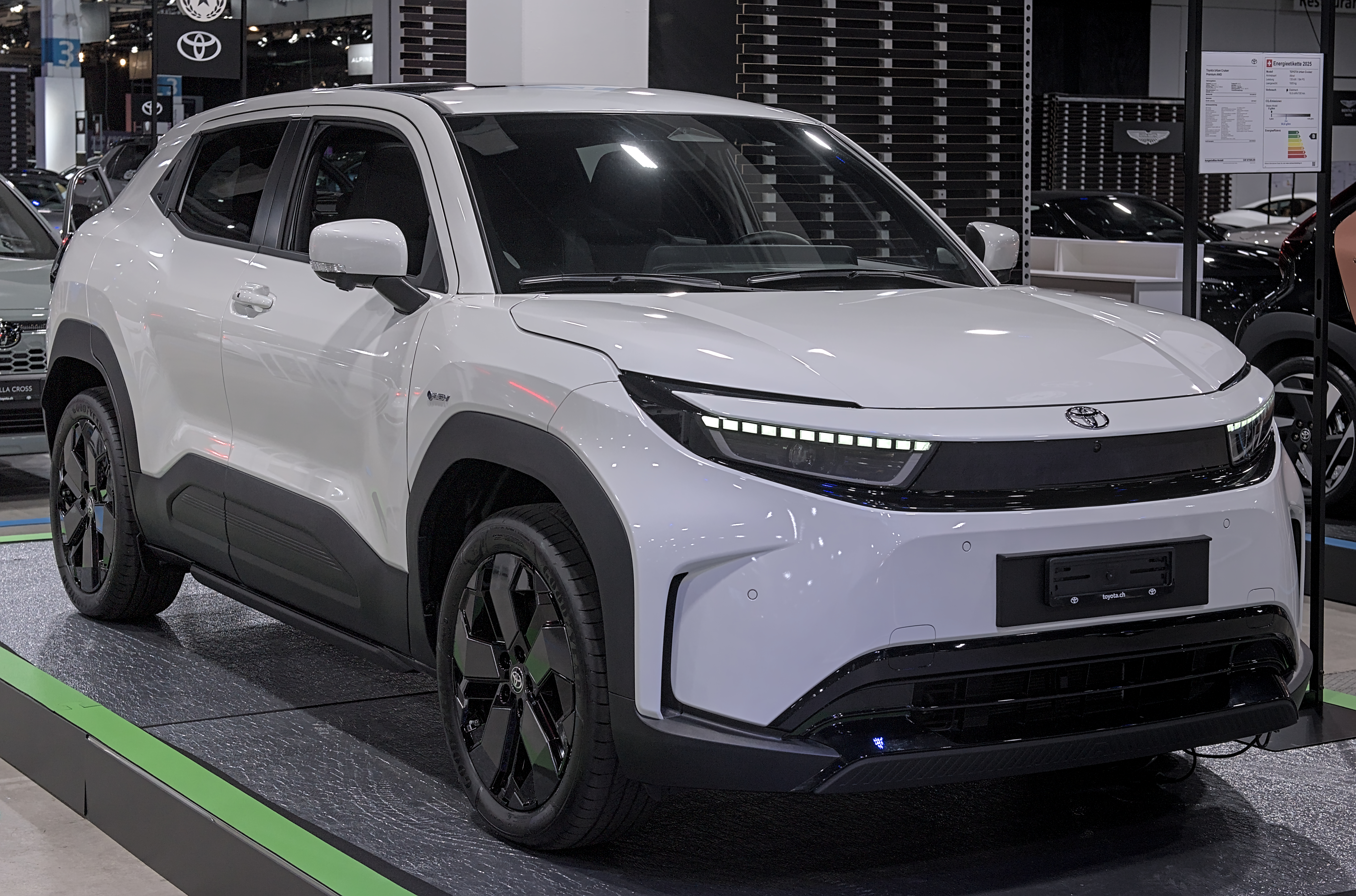
Toyota Urban Cruiser

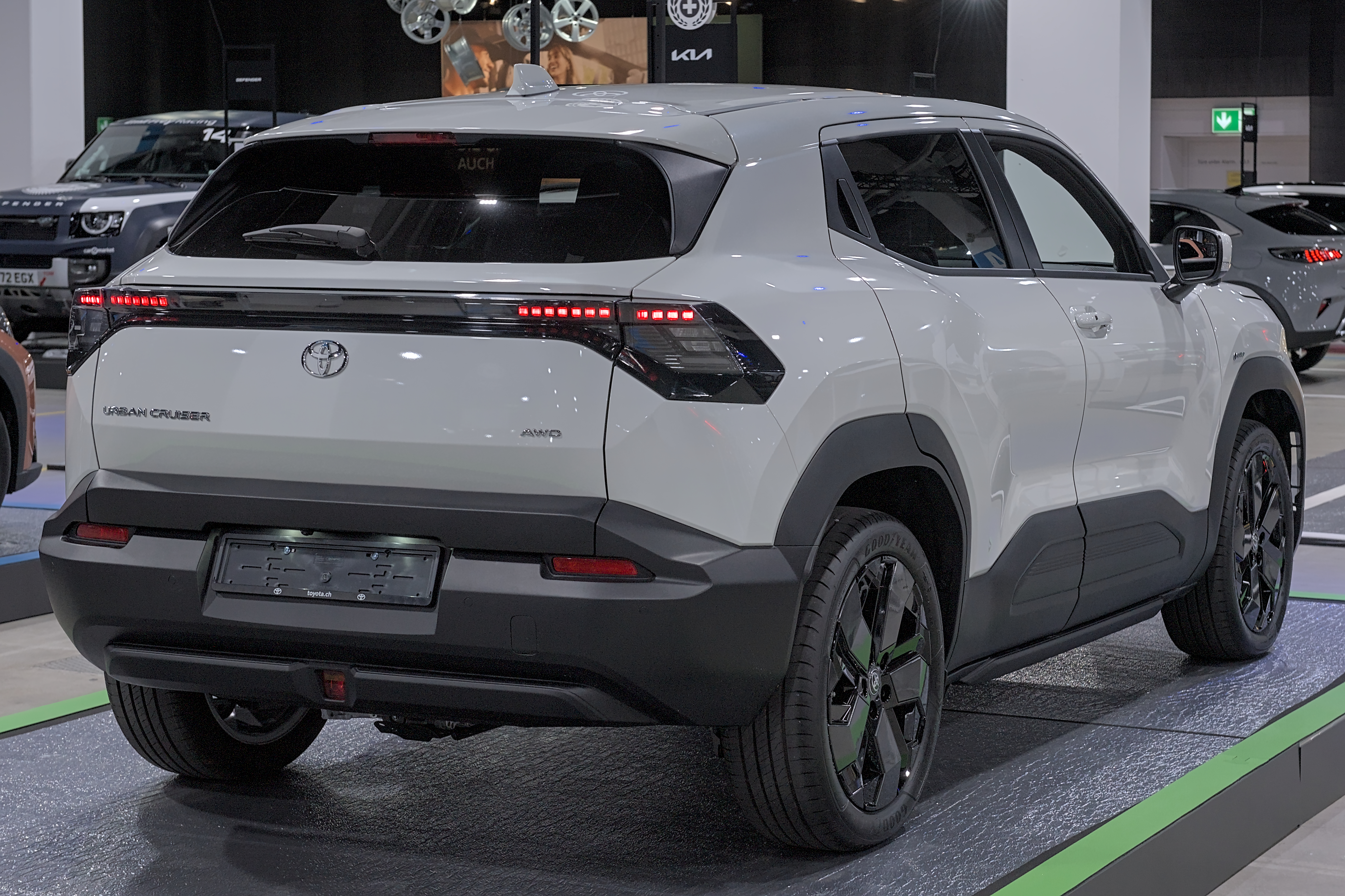
Rear view

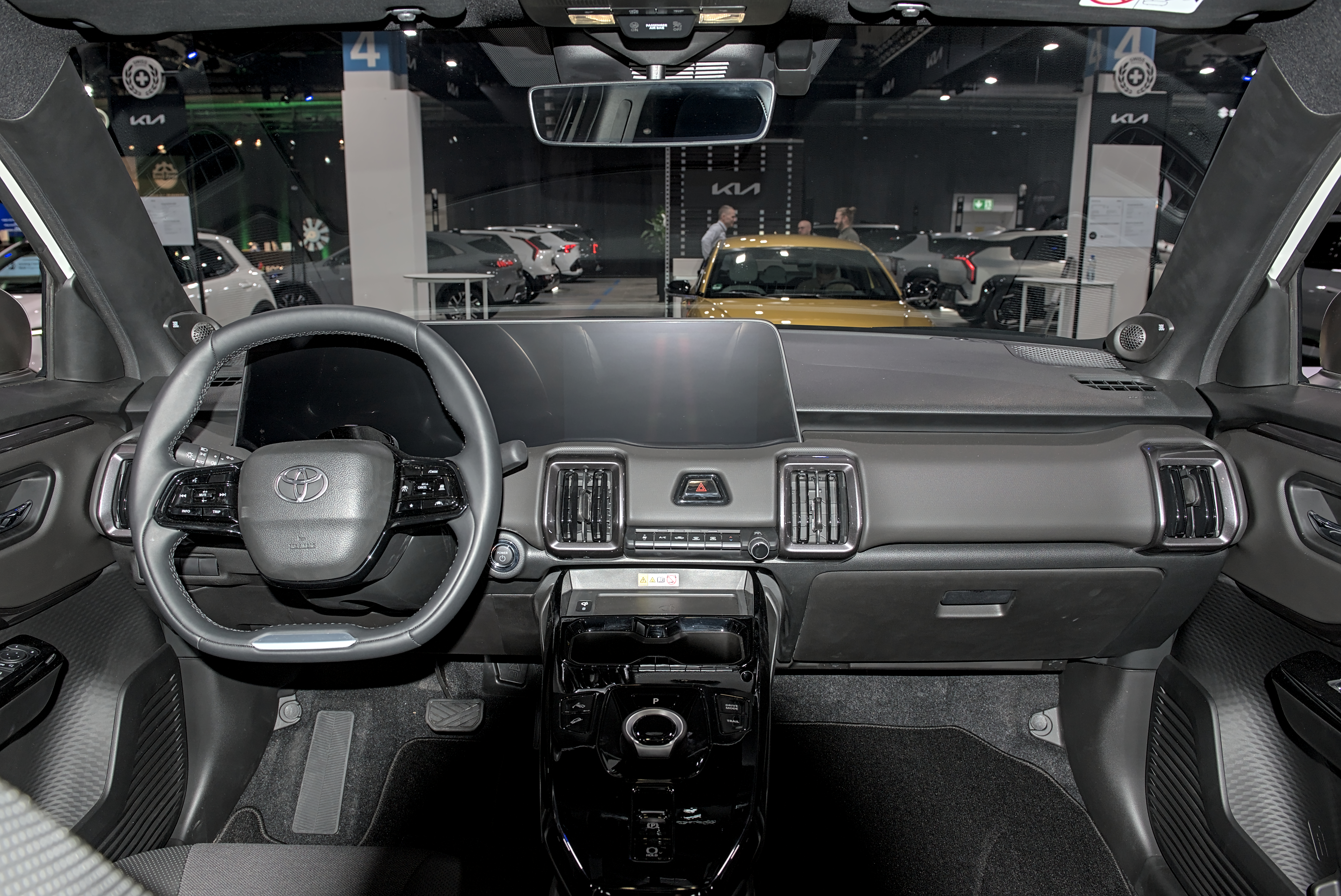
Interior
