= Manesar =

Manesar IMT Manesar
- Town
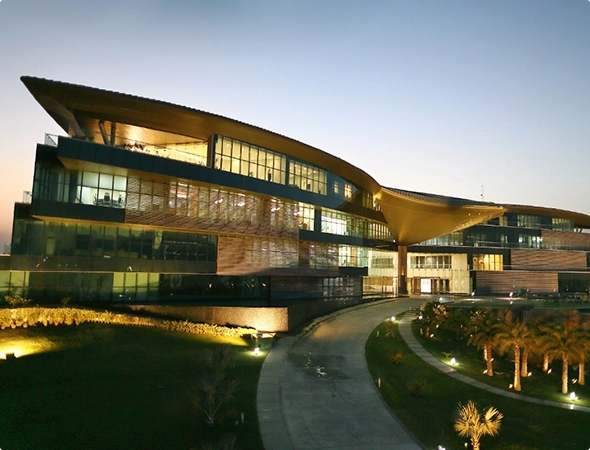
- IMT Manesar township building
- Nickname: Suburb of Gurugram
- Location in Haryana, India Manesar (India)
- Coordinates: 28.3553°N 76.9327°E
- Country: India
- State: Haryana
- District: Gurugram
- Metro: IMT Manesar

Government
  - Type: Municipal Corporation
  - Body: Manesar Municipal Corporation
  - Mayor: Inderjeet Yadav (BJP)
  - Lok Sabha MP: Rao Inderjeet Singh (BJP)
  - MLA: Bimla Chaudhary (BJP)
  - Municipal Commissioner: Manish Sharma (IAS)

Area
  - Total: 124.32 km^{2} (48.00 sq mi)
- Elevation: 259 m (850 ft)

Population (2011)
  - Total: 23,448
  - Density: 188.61/km^{2} (488.50/sq mi)

Languages
  - Official: Hindi, Haryanvi
  - Additional official: English
- Time zone: UTC+5:30 (IST)
- PIN: Manesar 122 051; IMT Manesar 122 052
- Vehicle registration: HR-26
- Planning agency: Haryana Urban Development Authority

Manesar is a town and municipal corporation, known as IMT Manesar in the Gurugram district of the state of Haryana, India and a part of the National Capital Region (NCR) of Delhi. It is an Industrial Model Township home to factories and industrial activity from multinational corporations.

Its proximity to the burgeoning city of Gurugram has in recent years caused its character and demographics to change dramatically. It has many factories, offices, hotels, IT parks and educational institutes. There are several sightseeing spots around the area, some overlapping with Gurugram. Manesar is 32 kilometres (20 mi) from Indira Gandhi International Airport and is located on National Highway 48, making it well connected with New Delhi, Gurugram, Rewari, Dharuhera (Rewari), Jaipur, Ahmedabad and Surat.

== Etymology ==
Manesar gets its name from the sanskrit language, in which the word "manesar" means the "lord of brain or wisdom" i.e. the Lord Shiva.

== History ==
Earlier Manesar was a sleepy village of about 1000 dwellings on the Delhi-Jaipur highway, then numbered as NH-8. Since the late 1990s, it has been transformed into a booming town. Its growth has been helped by government's drive to move out factories from Delhi as well as the growth of Gurgaon city and proximity to Delhi's Indira Gandhi International Airport (approximately 40 minutes). Farmers have become millionaires or multi-millionaires by selling their lands.

== Demographics ==
As of 2011 Indian Census, the Manesar census town had a total population of 23,448, of which 14,381 were males and 9,067 were females. Population within the age group of 0 to 6 years was 3,382. The total number of literates in Manesar was 18,105, which constituted 77.2% of the population with male literacy of 83.2% and female literacy of 67.8%. The effective literacy rate of 7+ population of Manesar was 90.2%, of which male literacy rate was 95.4% and female literacy rate was 81.6%. The Scheduled Castes population was 1,774. Manesar had 5074 households in 2011.

== Industrial Model Township ==
Manesar was planned in 1980's as Industrial Model Township(IMT) during formation of Maruti Udyog Ltd under Haryana State Industrial and Infrastructure Development Corporation which is under Haryana Government. Land acquisition proceedings for development of IMT Manesar were initiated in 1994–1995. Initial allotments of industrial plots to Maruti Vendors were made in 1997,and,other allotments commenced in 1999. Over the years,HSIIDC has allotted more than 2,100 plots for setting up of industrial ventures by entrepreneurs. There are several large multinational companies, such as Maruti Suzuki, Jaquar, JBM Auto and Toshiba Eco City. Aadhar's national data center is also located here. Also Indian Institute of Corporate Affairs under Ministry of Corporate Affairs is located here, and it also contains the Manesar Software Technology Park, which covers 170 acres (69 ha). In 2023, Manesar had 2200 industrial manufacturing units, which employee 300,000 employees including 200,000 living within Manesar and remaining commute daily from outside. Some of the large manufacturing units include Maruti and Honda.

Attempts by the Government of Haryana to acquire additional land for expansion of the IMT development from 2011 led to numerous protests and legal challenges from farmers and other residents. These were resolved in 2014 when it bought a total of 688 acres (278 ha) from three villages (Manesar, Nakhrola and Naurangpur) at a price set by the Punjab and Haryana High Court.

=== Manesar-Gurgaon land scam ===
On 17 September 2015, the Central Bureau of Investigation (CBI) registered a First Information Report under various sections of the Indian Penal Code relating to forgery, cheating and criminal conspiracy. These were in connection with alleged irregularities involving land acquisitions at IMT Manesar. Subsequently, in 2018, the former Haryana Chief Minister, Bhupinder Singh Hooda, together with real estate companies, officials of the state government's department of town and country planning and bureaucrats who worked with Hooda while he was Chief Minister were charged. The scam had allegedly resulted in a 15 billion INR loss to farmers in Manesar and the adjoining villages of Naurangpur and Lakhnoula whose land, amounting to 400 acres (160 ha), had been threatened with government purchase for "public purpose". Faced with the threat of government acquisition, farmers sold at knock-down prices, averaging 25 percent of market value, to real estate developers. The Hooda government then released the land from the acquisition threat, thus favouring the developers.

One of the beneficiary of the scam was Hooda's nephew, Sukhwinder, whose company was given change of land use (CLU) permission for 52 acres land on the same day the government acquisition process had lapsed for the want of release of funds, while at the same time CLU was denied to two other unrelated applicants.

The Supreme Court of India cancelled the acquisition and grant of land to the developers and directed the CBI to inquire further. The government was instructed to "recover every single pie". Court returned the land to Haryana government. Land would not be returned to the landholders more than the prevailing price. The builders will not be allowed to recover any money they paid to land owners as the deal was done to benefit them and "middlemen". The court said:

The acquisition process was withdrawn with fraudulent intentions after the land was purchased by the private builders in active connivance with state functionaries. The builders and private entities were aware that the acquisition would not go through. The entire acquisition proceedings were initiated with mala fide intention, illegally and in violation of the provisions of the Land Acquisition Act. It was not a mere bonanza or a deal, but denoted quid pro quo.

== Administration ==
Manesar municipal corporation and Manesar tehsil were established in 2020. In 2023, Manesar municipal area spread over 20 km includes 29 villages.

=== Proposal for new city ===
In 2018, the Chief Minister, Manohar Lal Khattar, announced a new city that would adjoin Gurgaon and incorporate an area from Manesar towards Rewari, and also the area around Pataudi. The new city is likely to be spread across at least 50,000 hectares, which is larger than Chandigarh (11,400 hectares) but smaller than Gurgaon (73,200 hectares).

=== Proposal of a new municipal corporation ===
In November 2020, Haryana Chief Minister Manohar Lal Khattar announced the creation of a new municipal corporation in Manesar. In December 2020, the Haryana Government approved the formation of the Manesar Municipal Corporation in a cabinet meeting.

== Transport & connectivity ==
- Air
  - Indira Gandhi International Airport (IGI Delhi), 40 km north
  - Noida International Airport, 100 km east
  - Hindon Airport, domestic flights only, 70 km north
  - Hisar Airport, 190 km northwest
- Rail
  - Haryana Orbital Rail Corridor (HORC) has stop at Manesar.
  - Gurgaon railway station is nearest major station.
  - Other nearest railway station is Garhi Harsaru railway station.
- Road
  - Expressways and Highways: Manesar lies on Delhi-Jaipur NH48, Western Peripheral Expressway (WPE), and Dwarka Expressway.
  - Manesar is served by many local buses and Haryana Roadways states buses.
- Ropeway
  - Manesar-Dhaula Kuan ropeway between Dhaula Kuan (Delhi) to Manesar (Gurugram) with stopover at IGI Aerocity, planned, nearly 40 km-long pod ropeway with 200 km/h speed will cutdown over 1 hr travel time to few minutes, repeatedly announced by the MoRTH minister Gadkari several times include in Sept 2025.

== Education ==
The first training center of National Security Guard (NSG), commonly known as Black Cat commandos - a counter-terrorism unit of India, was opened in Manesar which also has a National Bomb Data center. National Brain Research Centre (NBRC) is also at Manesar.

There are many government and private schools, the former being managed by the Government of Haryana through the Haryana Board of School Education (HBSE).

== Tourism ==
The Heritage Transport Museum is situated on a 3 acres (1.2 ha) plot at Tauru Gurgaon, near Manesar. A built-up area of over 90,000 sq ft (8,400 m^{2}) spread over four floors houses the exhibition galleries, library and reference centre, conference rooms, mini auditorium, the museum shop, and a restaurant facility.

== Military Significance ==
The operations and training headquarters of the National Security Guards is located in Manesar near NH 48.

== Quarantine site ==
In January 2020, the Indian Army set up a quarantine camp in Manesar for suspected cases of Coronavirus disease 2019. 300 Indian students airlifted from Wuhan district of China were quarantined and observed for 14 days, after which those with no symptoms were allowed to go home.

== Economy ==
Some of the industrial units functioning in Manesar are:

- Riello Power India Pvt Ltd
- Alcatel-Lucent
- Alere Inc.
- Baxter
- BorgWarner
- Denso Haryana
- Dudhsagar Dairy
- Hero MotoCorp
- Honda Motorcycle & Scooters India
- Johnson Matthey
- Keysight Technologies
- Mankind Pharma
- Maruti Suzuki
- Samsung
- Pfizer

== See also ==
- Administrative divisions of Haryana
- Tourism in Haryana
