= Suzuki Baleno (2015) =

Subcompact car

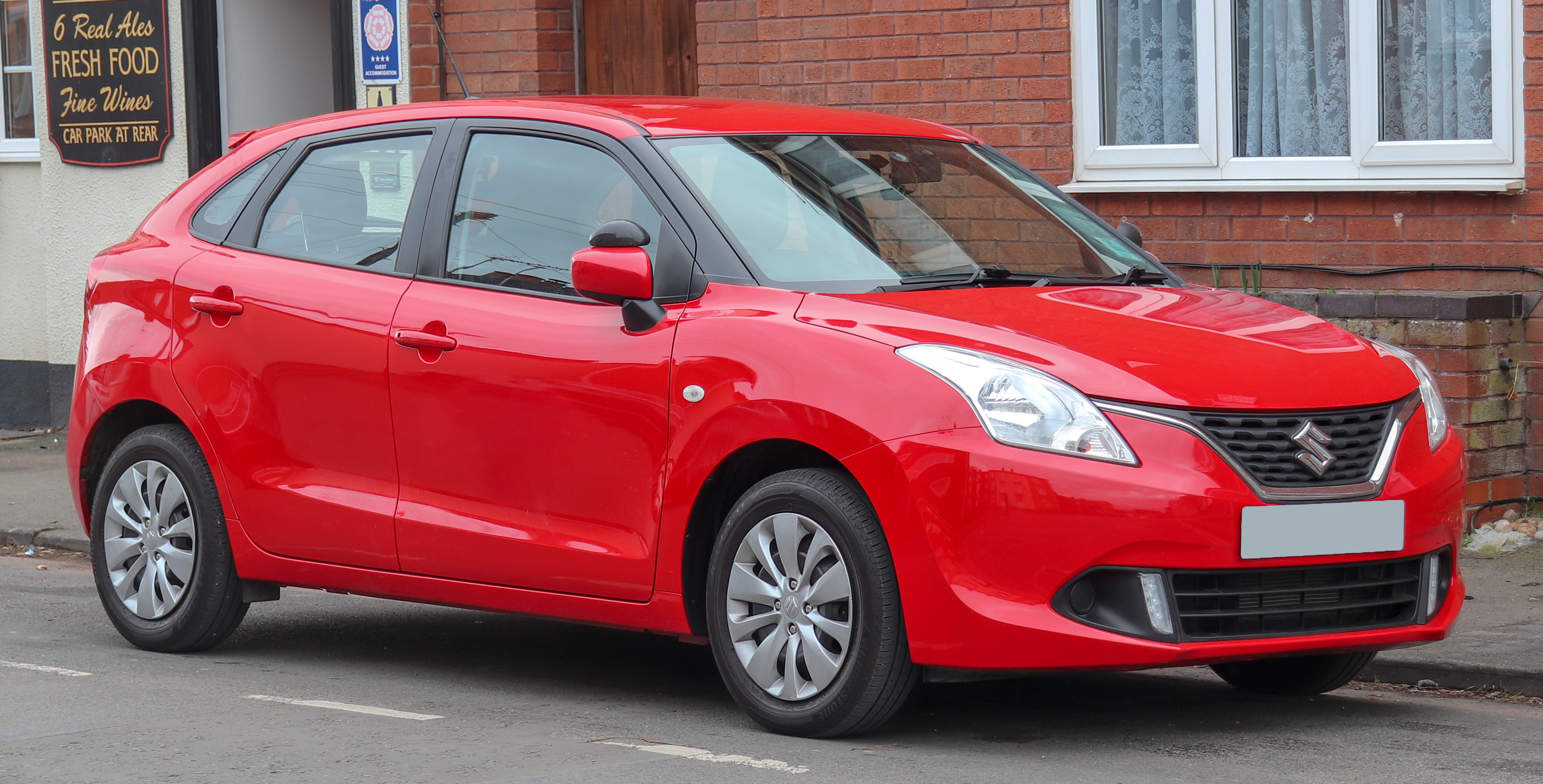
- 2017 Suzuki Baleno SZ3 Dualjet (UK)

Overview
- Manufacturer: Suzuki
- Also called: Toyota Glanza (India, 2019–present); Toyota Starlet (Africa, 2020–present)
- Production: September 2015 – present
- Assembly: India: Manesar (Maruti Suzuki); Ahmedabad (Suzuki Motor Gujarat)

Body and chassis
- Class: Subcompact car (B)
- Body style: 5-door hatchback
- Layout: Front-engine, front-wheel-drive
- Platform: HEARTECT B platform
- Related: Suzuki Fronx; Suzuki Swift (third generation); Suzuki Dzire (third generation)

Chronology
- Predecessor: Suzuki Swift (Indonesia); Toyota Etios hatchback (Glanza/Starlet); Toyota Yaris (XP150) hatchback (Starlet, South Africa)

The Suzuki Baleno (Japanese: スズキ・バレーノ, Hepburn: Suzuki Barēno) is a subcompact car produced by the Japanese manufacturer Suzuki in India and some other countries since September 2015 with a hatchback body style.

Prior to this, the "Baleno" nameplate had been applied to the Cultus Crescent in numerous markets and also for sedan version of Aerio and SX4 in Indonesia. Unlike the previous generations of Baleno when it was offered as a sedan, wagon, or a 3-door hatchback, the model sold since 2015 is exclusively offered as a 5-door hatchback.

Since June 2019, it is also marketed at Toyota dealerships in India as the Toyota Glanza, and since September 2020 in several African countries as the Toyota Starlet.

The word "baleno" means "lightning" in Italian.

== First generation (WB1; 2015) ==
First generation
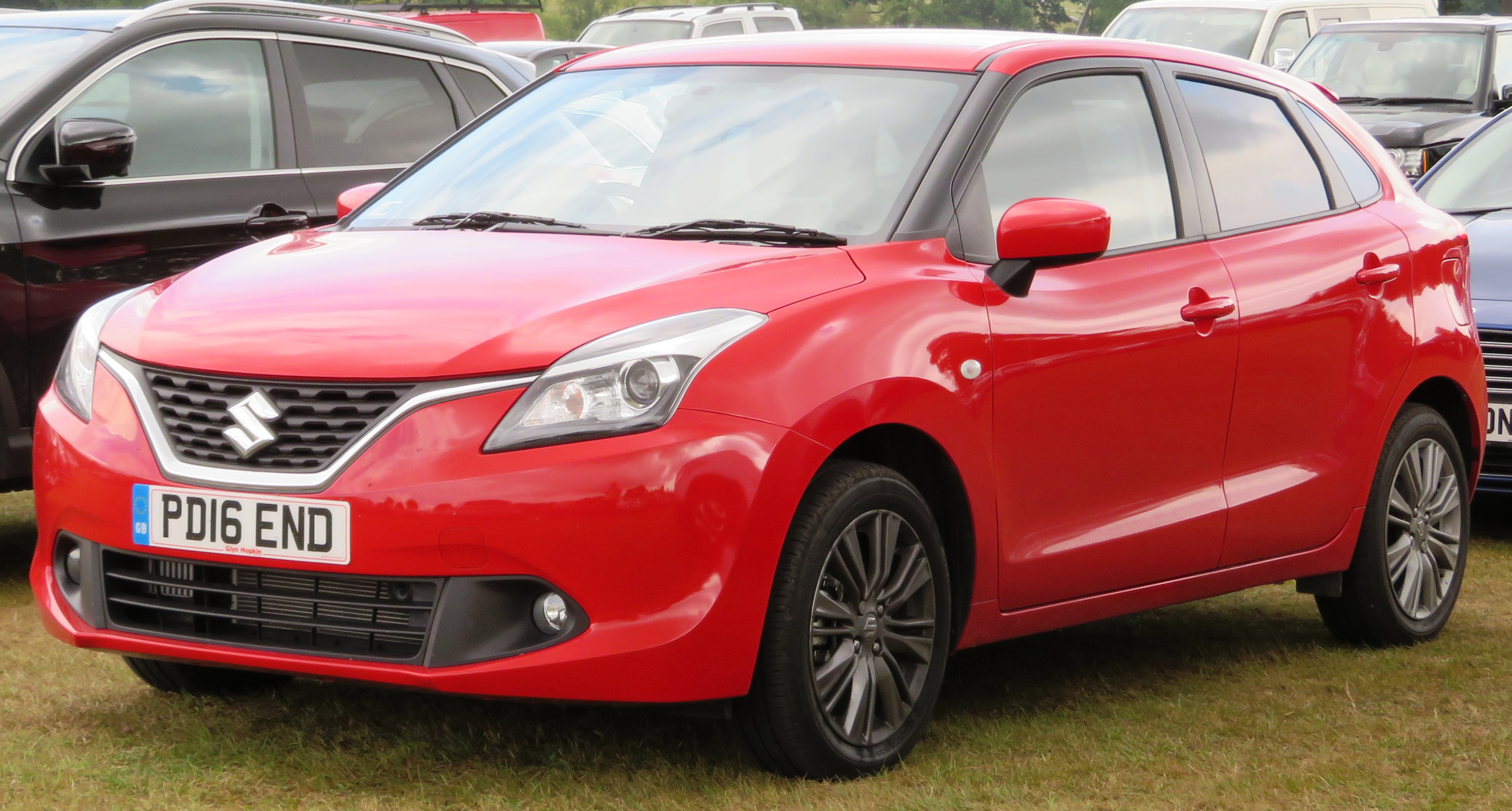
- 2016 Suzuki Baleno SZ-T Boosterjet (UK; pre-facelift)

Overview
- Model code: WB1
- Production: September 2015 – January 2022
- Designer: Yoshio Takeuchi (pre-facelift); Takashi Maeda (facelift); Kikako Kaneko (RS facelift)

Powertrain
- Engine: Petrol: 998 cc K10C Boosterjet I3-T (WB42S); 1197 cc K12M I4 (WB22S); 1242 cc K12C Dualjet I4 (WB32S); 1373 cc K14B I4 (WB52S); MHEV: 1197 cc K12N Dualjet SHVS I4; 1242 cc K12C Dualjet SHVS I4; Diesel: 1248 cc D13A DDiS 190 I4-TD (WB62S)
- Electric motor: DC synchronous belt-driven Integrated Starter Generator (ISG)
- Transmission: 5-speed manual (all engines); 4-speed automatic (K14B); 6-speed automatic AWTF-80 SC (K10C); CVT (K12C/M)
- Hybrid drivetrain: 12-volt Mild Hybrid Smart Hybrid Vehicle by Suzuki (SHVS)
- Battery: Lithium-ion

Dimensions
- Wheelbase: 2,520 mm (99.2 in)
- Length: 3,995 mm (157.3 in)
- Width: 1,745 mm (68.7 in)
- Height: 1,460–1,510 mm (57.5–59.4 in)
- Curb weight: 865–1,005 kg (1,907–2,216 lb)

The car was officially unveiled first to the public at the 66th IAA Frankfurt Motor Show on 15 September 2015. It was previewed by the iK-2 concept car that was first shown at the 85th Geneva Motor Show in March 2015.

The Baleno is built on the new lightweight HEARTECT platform, shared with the smaller Swift and Ignis hatchbacks. Baleno is the first vehicle from Maruti Suzuki to be underpinned with the newly developed platform. It has a luggage volume of 320–355 litres (with or without spare tyre), which can be expanded to 756 litres when the rear seats folded. The total interior volume is 1085 litres (VDA method). The "Liquid Flow" design has drag coefficient of Cd=0.299, making Baleno the most streamlined production Suzuki to date. The car has ground clearance between 120 and 170 mm depending on the market to suit the road conditions.

It is built on a powertrain range of K-series petrol engines: a new three-cylinder 1.0-litre Boosterjet turbocharged direct injection engine, a four-cylinder 1.25-litre Dualjet dual injector engine, which is also available with mild hybrid SHVS (Smart Hybrid Vehicle by Suzuki) technology. There is also 1.2-litre conventional petrol and mild hybrid engines mainly offered for Indian market and a 1.4-litre engine equipped for most regions outside Europe and India. A 1.25-litre Fiat-sourced turbo-diesel engine is also available exclusively for Indian market.

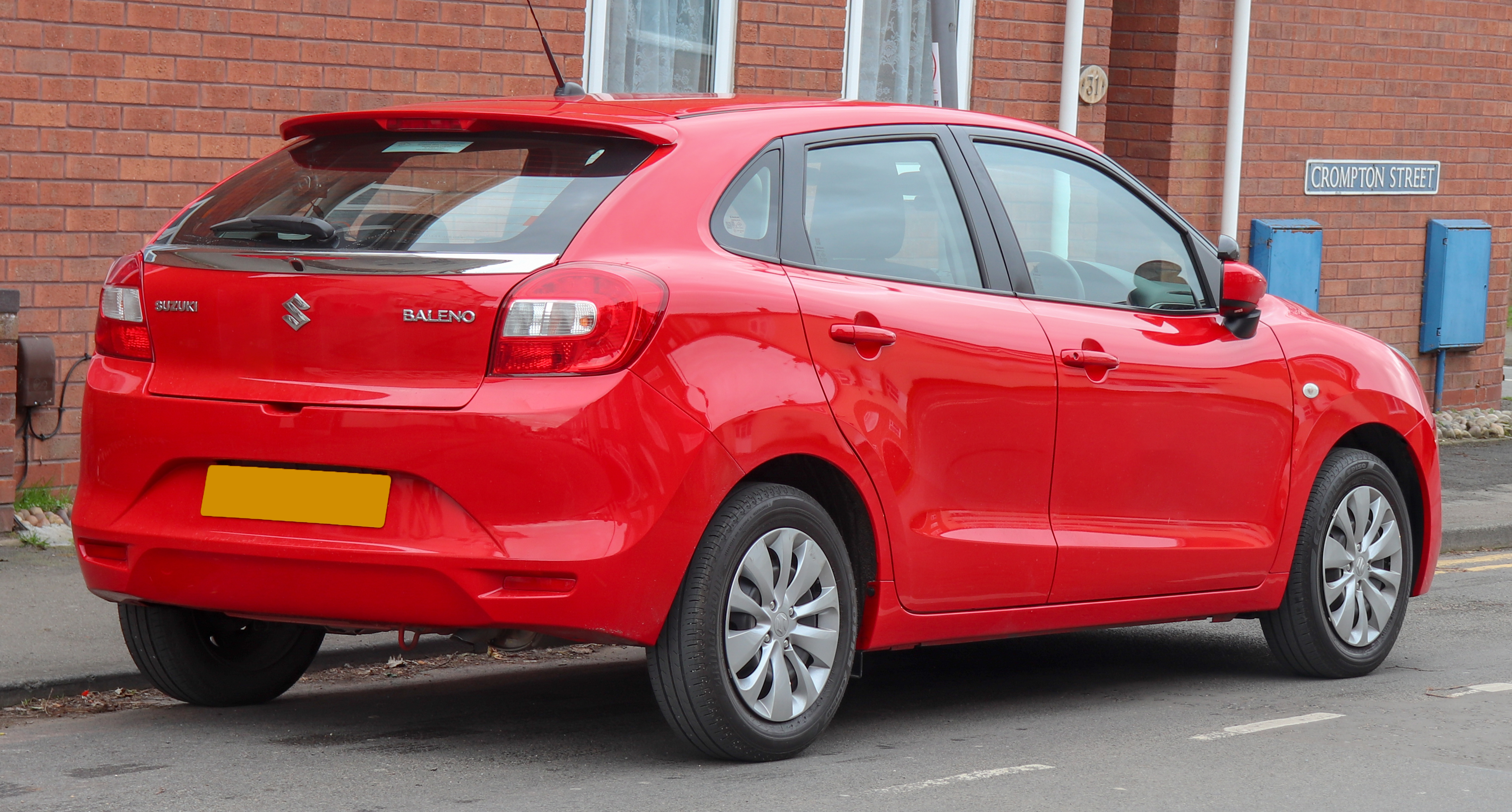
2017 Suzuki Baleno SZ3 Dualjet (UK; pre-facelift)

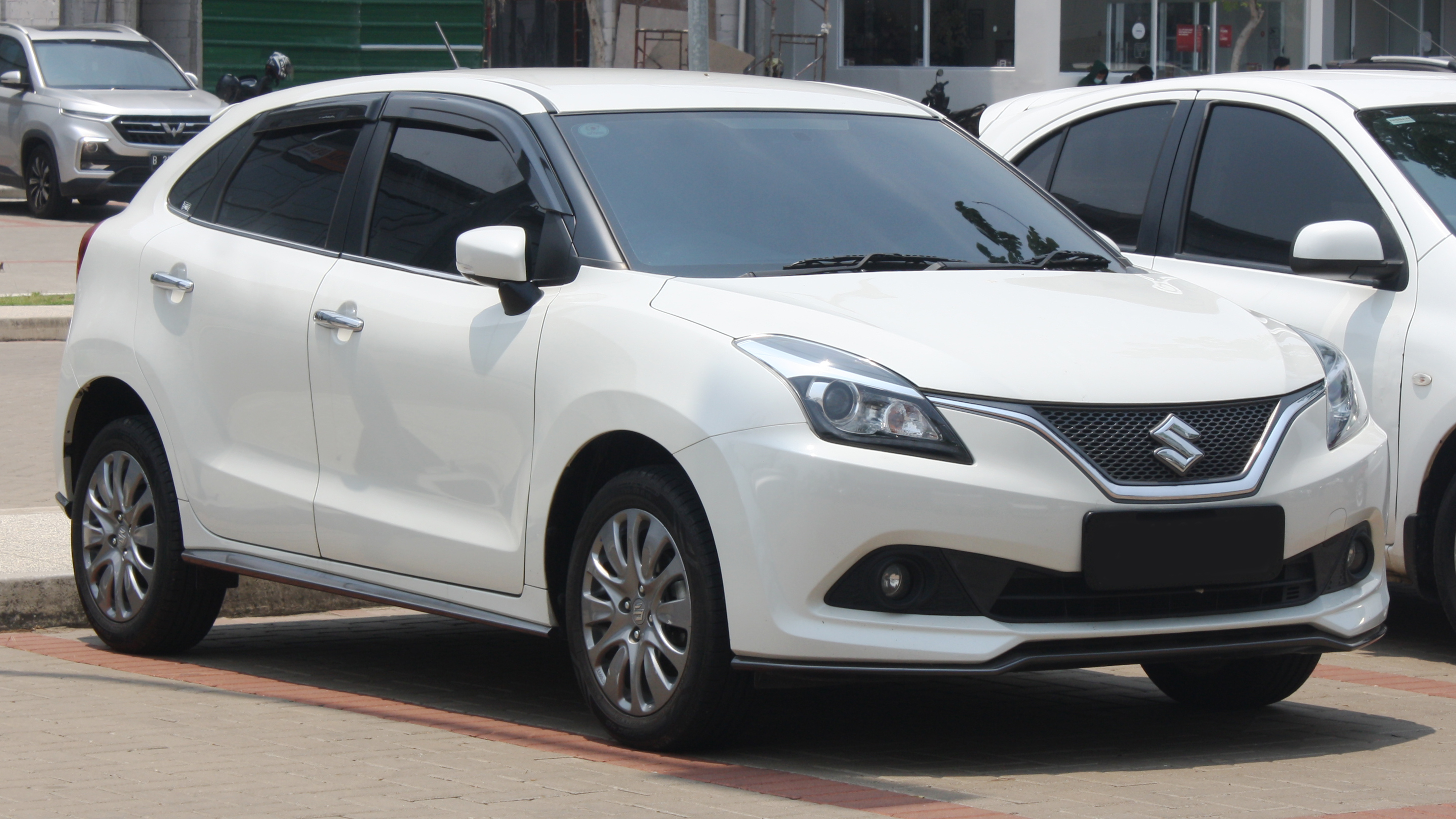
2019 Suzuki Baleno GL (Indonesia; pre-facelift), which adopted the Indian Baleno RS styling

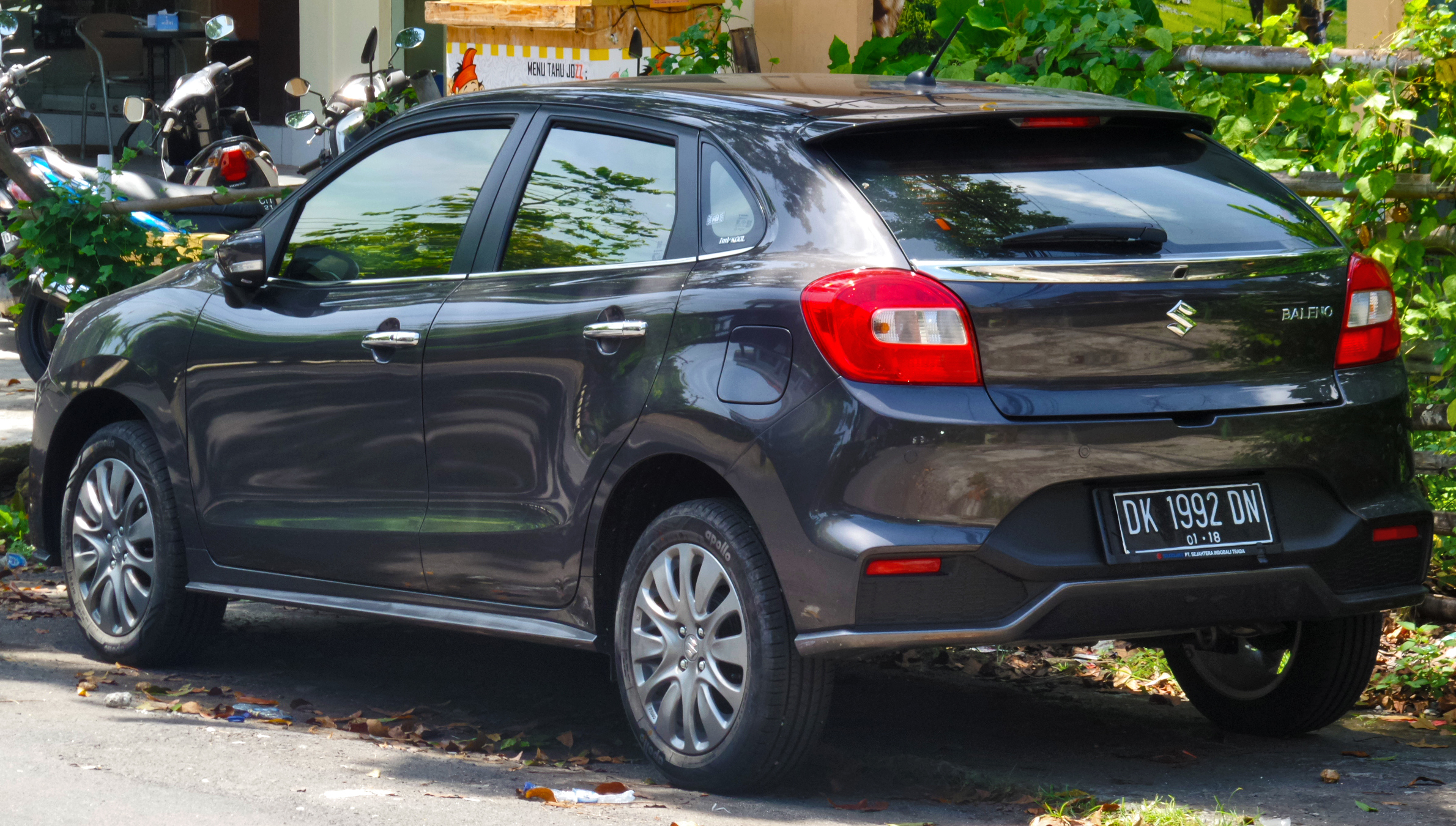
2017 Suzuki Baleno GL (Indonesia; pre-facelift), which adopted the Indian Baleno RS styling

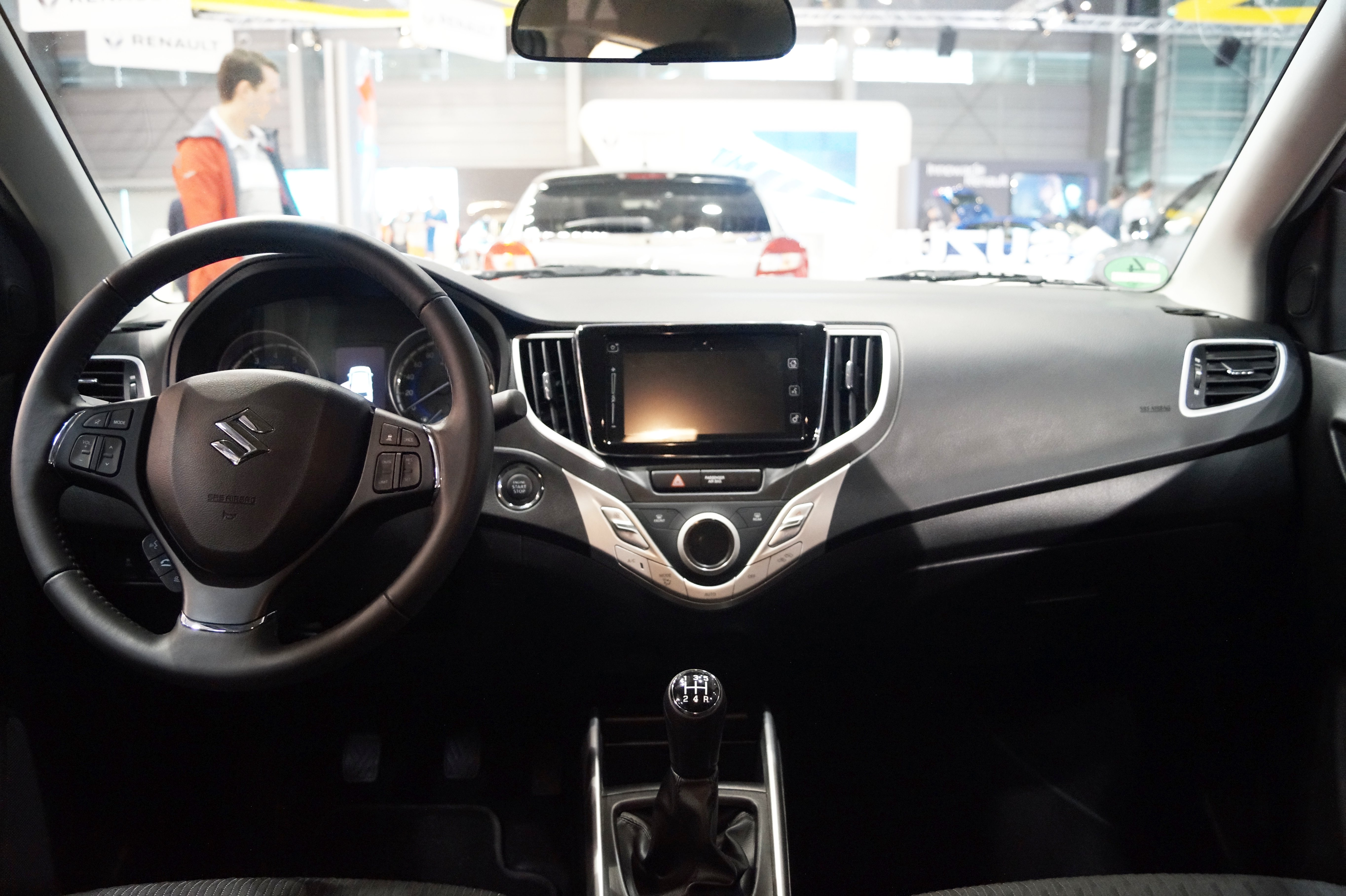
Interior

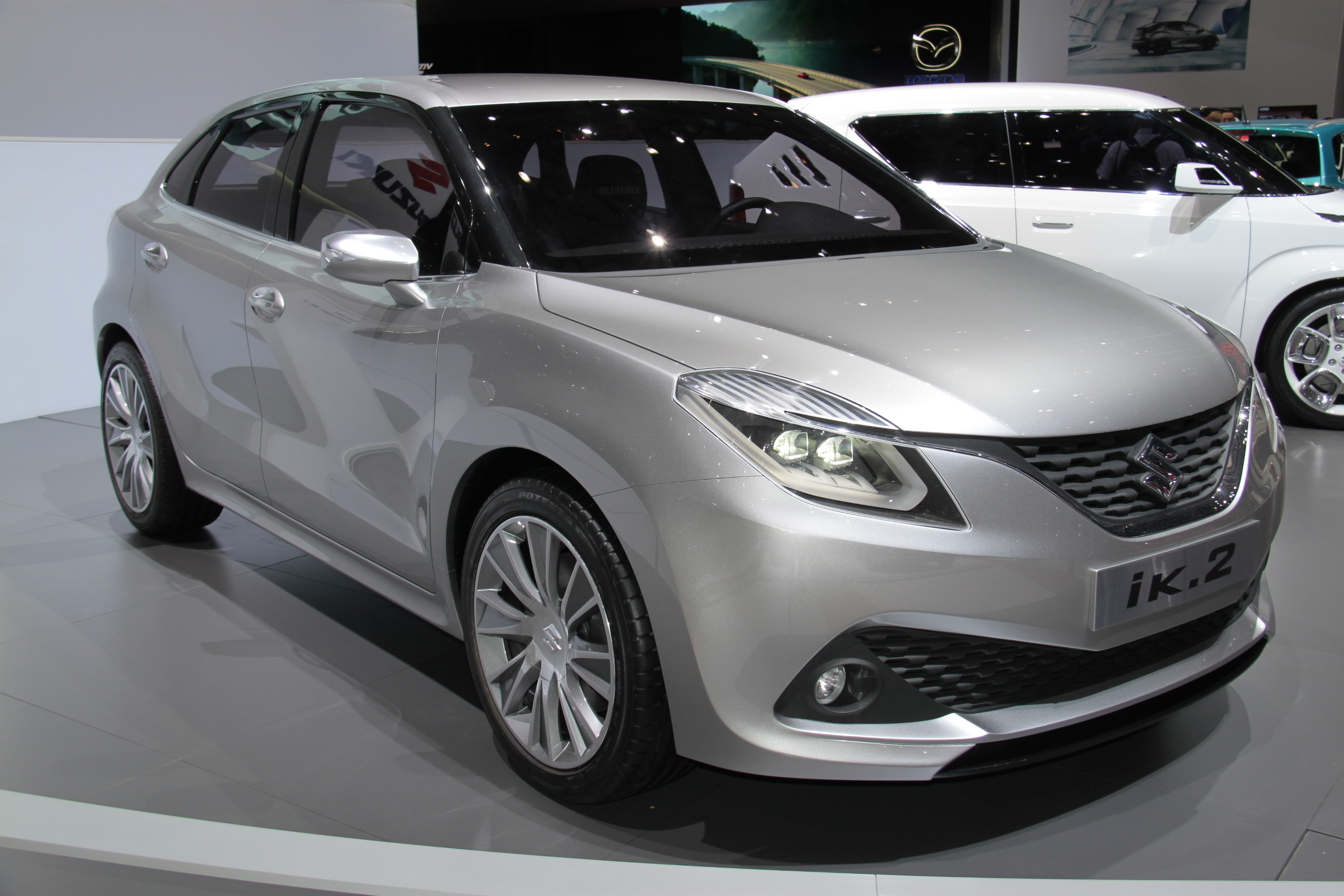
Suzuki iK-2 concept car that previews the 2015 Baleno

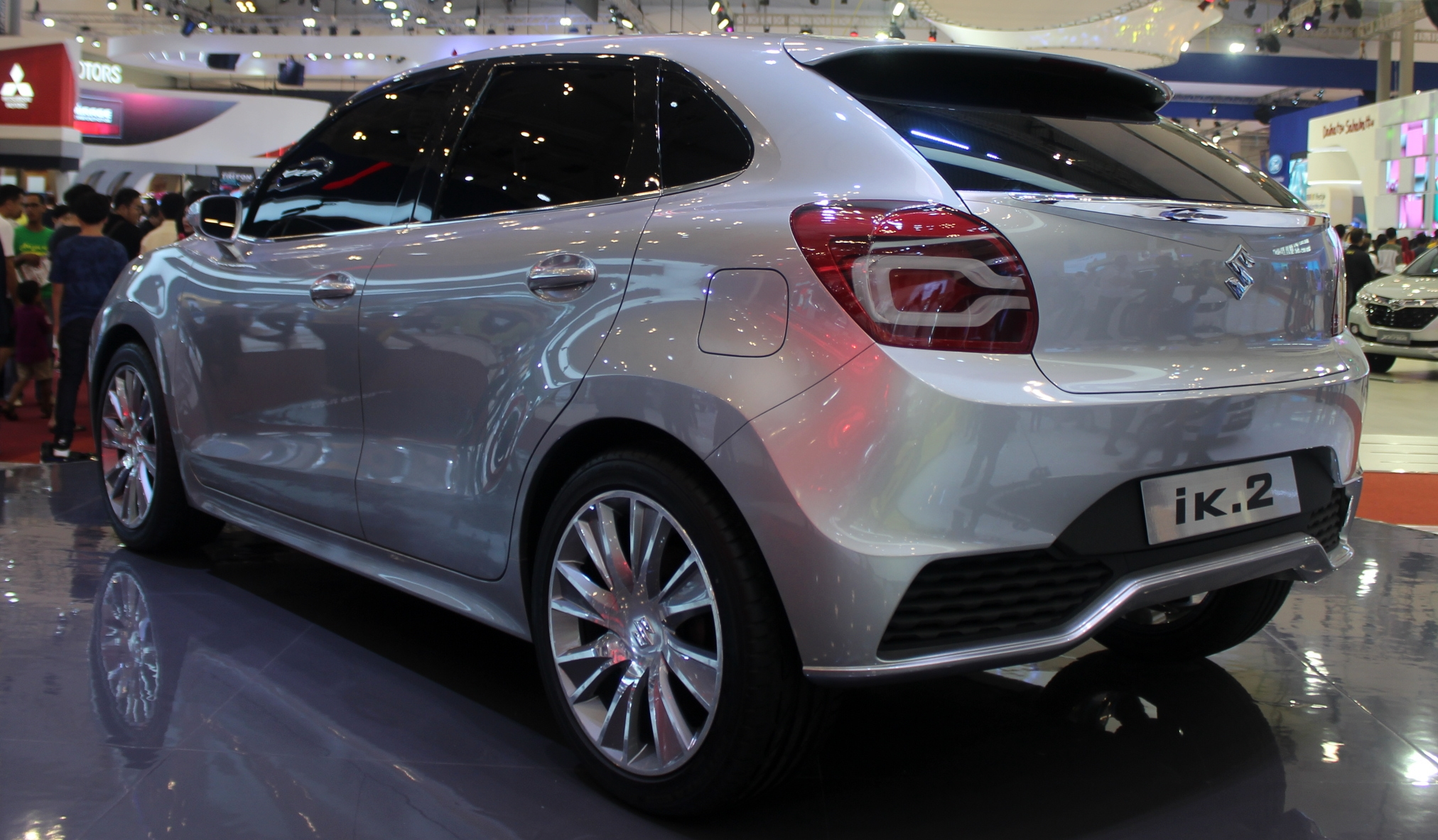
Rear view of Suzuki iK-2 concept

=== Facelift ===
The facelifted Baleno was launched first in India on 28 January 2019. Suzuki redesigned the Baleno's exterior with remodelled front bumper with new grille design and new 16-inch alloy wheels design with dual-tone colour. The interior also upgraded with a dual-tone black-and-blue colour scheme. The interior noise and ride comfort are also improved.

The facelifted model is not available in Europe, Japan and several other countries after Suzuki decided to not continue selling the Baleno in those markets in 2020 and focused on the more popular Swift.

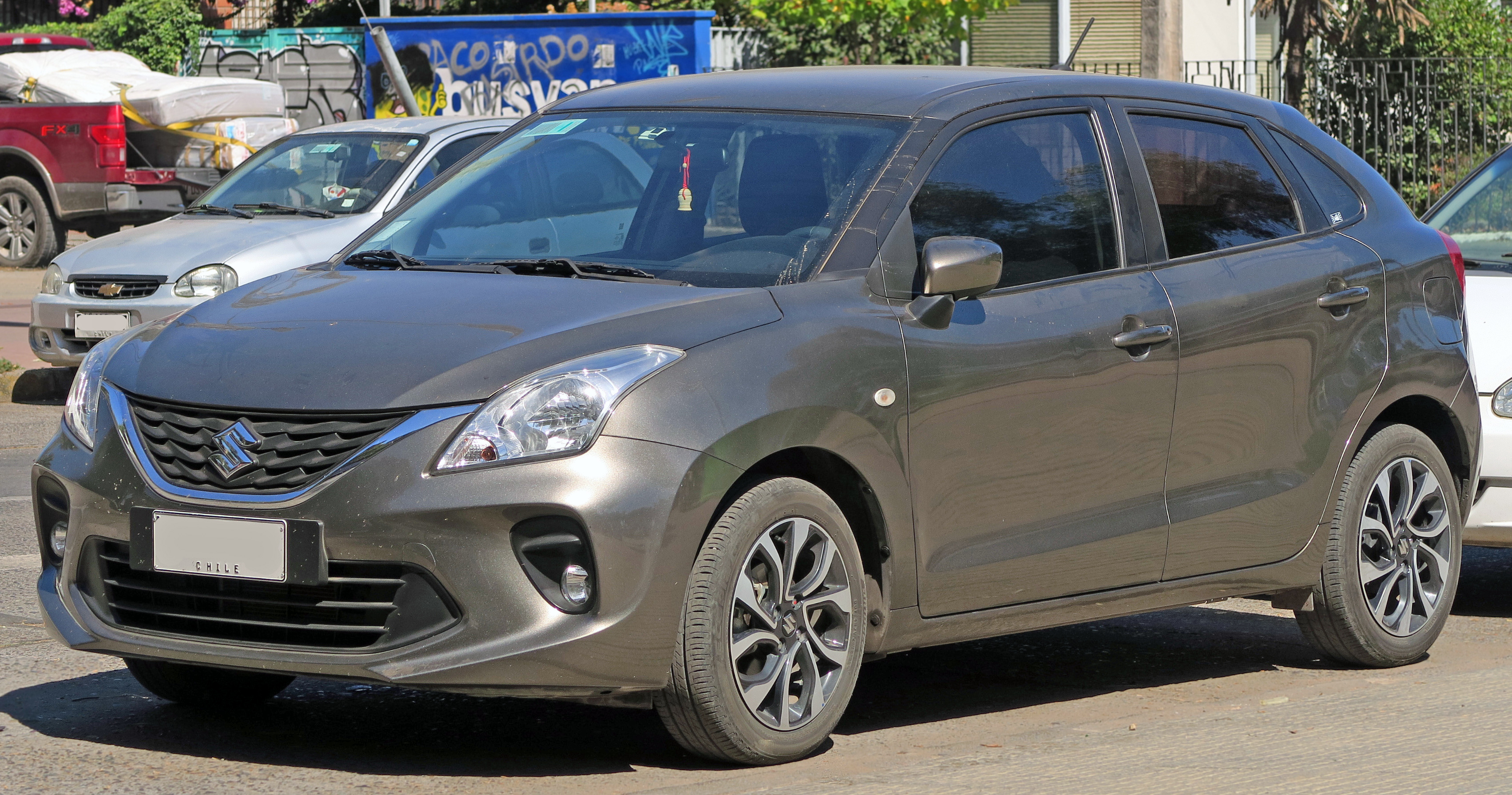
2021 Suzuki Baleno GLS (Chile; facelift)

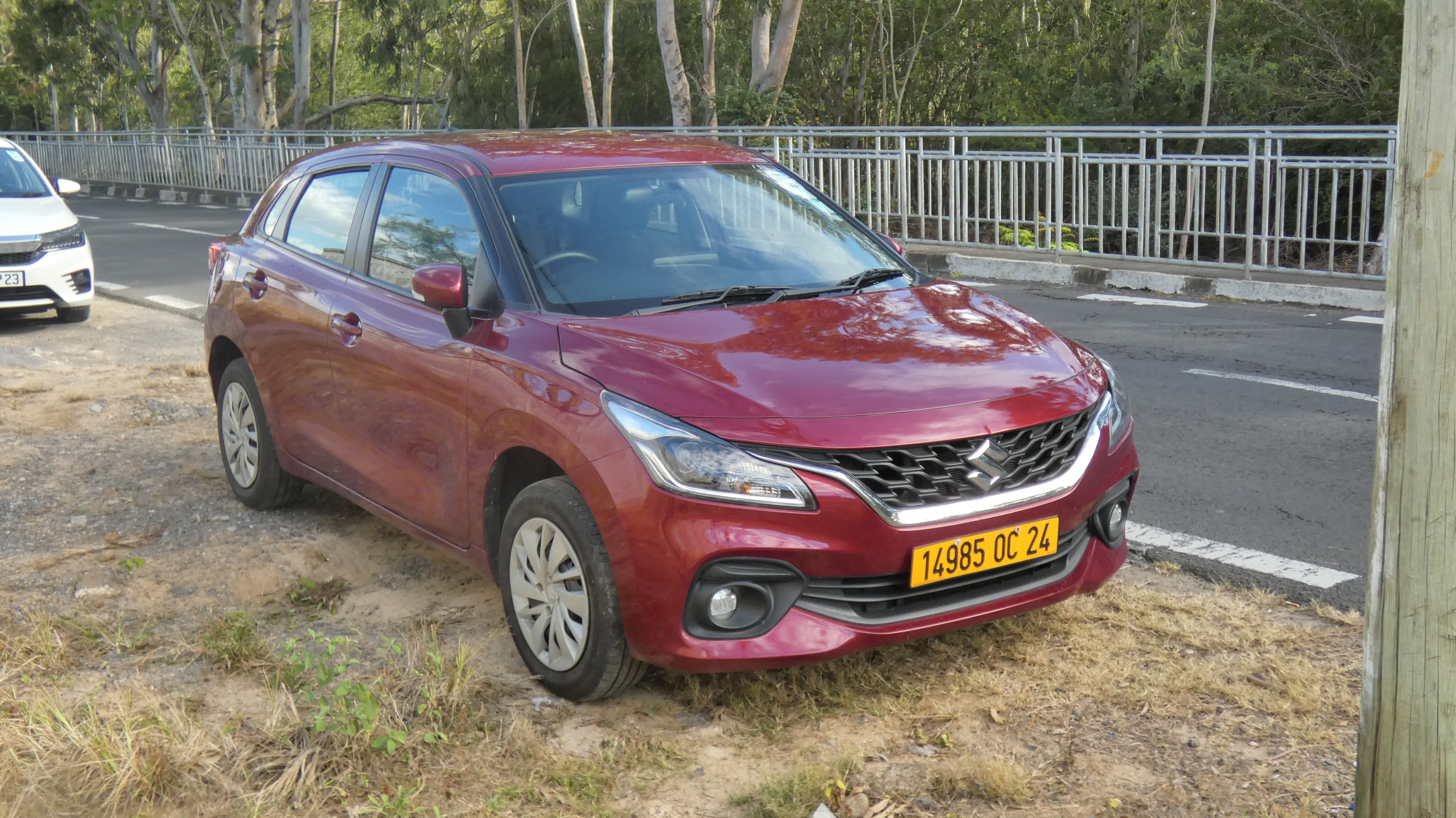
2020 Suzuki Baleno (Mauritius; facelift)

=== Markets ===
==== Europe ====
The Baleno was announced first in Italy in December 2015, but the sales was postponed until April 2016. European market Baleno is powered by 1.0-litre three-cylinder direct injection turbocharged K10C Boosterjet petrol engine, generating 111 PS (109 hp; 82 kW) and a 1.25-litre four-cylinder dual injectors K12C Dualjet petrol engine, generating 90 PS (89 hp; 66 kW). Mild hybrid variant is also available for the 1.25-litre engine. Due to low sales, the Baleno was discontinued in Europe in 2020.

===== United Kingdom =====
The Baleno was launched in the UK in June 2016 with two trim levels; SZ-T and SZ5. The cheaper SZ3 trim was added in April 2017. It was discontinued in August 2019 alongside the Celerio city car.

==== Asia ====
===== India =====
The Baleno was introduced in India on 26 October 2015. Slots above the Swift, the hatchback was built to maximize interior space while retaining Indian GST structure benefit for vehicles with length dimension under 4 meters and powered by either 1200 cc petrol or 1500 cc diesel engine. The Baleno is exclusively sold through Maruti Suzuki's premium NEXA outlets across India. The car is available in four trim levels - Sigma, Delta, Zeta and Alpha.

There are three engine options for the Indian model: a four-cylinder 1.2-litre K12M petrol engine that generates 83 PS (82 hp; 61 kW) of power and 114 N⋅m (11.6 kg⋅m; 84 lb⋅ft) of torque, a four-cylinder 1.25-litre Multijet/DDiS 190 diesel engine that generates 75 PS (74 hp; 55 kW) of power and 190 N⋅m (19 kg⋅m; 140 lb⋅ft) of torque, and a three-cylinder turbocharged 1.0-litre K10C Boosterjet engine which is the same engine that is found in the European market Baleno. All the engines get a 5-speed manual as standard, while the K12M engine is offered with a CVT option (initially only available for Delta trim, followed by Zeta in April 2016 and Alpha in August 2017). All variants are equipped with dual airbags, ABS and EBD as standard.

A performance variant for Indian market called Baleno RS ("Road Sport") was launched in March 2017. The Baleno RS was first displayed in India as a concept model at the 2016 Auto Expo, alongside the Ignis. The styling is almost similar to the 2015 iK-2 concept car. It is powered with a 1.0-litre three-cylinder direct injection Boosterjet turbocharged petrol engine, generating 102 PS (101 hp; 75 kW) and paired with the same 5-speed manual transmission gearbox that was offered in the standard versions of the car. It was also provided with full-black alloy wheels (which was removed in the 2019 upgrade), disc brakes on all wheels (14 inch front and 13 inch rear) and tuned suspension. The Baleno RS was supposed to launch by the end of 2016, but the launches got pushed to the beginning of 2017, due to a lot of pending deliveries for the regular Baleno and the Vitara Brezza and production constraints.

The facelifted regular and RS models were introduced on 28 January 2019. A new model with a 1.2-litre K12N Dualjet dual injector petrol engine with mild hybrid technology which produces 90 PS (89 hp; 66 kW) was launched in April 2019, It is only available for Delta and Zeta trims and without CVT option.

The Baleno RS was discontinued in January 2020 after Maruti Suzuki decided not to upgrade the 1.0-litre Boosterjet engine to meet the Bharat Stage 6 emission standards. Despite positive reviews from critics, the Baleno RS was not well received by the market despite multiple price cuts and readily available units at showrooms as compared to a long waiting period for the regular Baleno.

In May 2020, the 1.25-litre turbodiesel engine was discontinued due to stricter emission standards.

By the end of 2021, Maruti Suzuki sold over one million (10 lakh) units of the Baleno.

===== Japan =====
The Baleno began its sales in Japan on 9 March 2016. Initially, only base model XG with 1.25-litre K12C Dualjet four-cylinder petrol engine was available, followed by the more expensive XT with 1.0-litre K10C Boosterjet three-cylinder turbocharged petrol engine in May. In November 2016, the middle trim called XS was added with 1.25-litre engine and XG trim was axed later in December. To gain wider range of customers, the 1.0-litre turbocharged engine was reworked to be able to run with regular petrol octane (89–94 RON) in May 2018. This changes made the engine power and torque dropped from 111 PS (109 hp; 82 kW) and 160 N⋅m (16 kg⋅m; 120 lb⋅ft) to 102 PS (101 hp; 75 kW) and 150 N⋅m (15 kg⋅m; 110 lb⋅ft). In July 2020, Suzuki stopped selling Baleno in Japan.

===== Indonesia =====
The hatchback was launched in the country on 10 August 2017 at the 25th Gaikindo Indonesia International Auto Show. The Indonesian market Baleno is based on the Indian Baleno RS to suit the local preference. Instead of positioned above the Swift like in other markets, the car is marketed as the successor to second-generation Swift and positioned above the smaller 1.2-litre Ignis. It is offered in sole GL trim level with a 1.4-litre four-cylinder petrol engine inherited from the Swift, generating 92 PS (91 hp; 68 kW) and 130 N⋅m (13 kg⋅m; 96 lb⋅ft) of torque, paired with either 5-speed manual or 4-speed automatic transmission. The Indonesian market Baleno received its facelift on 20 December 2019, once again based on the facelifted Baleno RS.

===== Taiwan =====
The hatchback was launched for Taiwanese market in March 2017. It is only available in sole unnamed trim, powered with a 1.0-litre Boosterjet engine and mated with a 6-speed automatic transmission. The sales was discontinued in October 2020 due to low sales.

===== Sri Lanka =====
The Indian market Baleno Zeta was introduced to the country in August 2016. The hatchback is powered with the same 1.2-litre petrol engine and only paired to a CVT. The facelifted model was introduced in June 2019, which is New Zealand specification Baleno. The hatchback is improved with projector LED headlights, 1.0-litre turbocharged engine, 6-speed automatic transmission, rear disc brake, six airbags, cruise control and several new features.

==== Latin America ====
===== Colombia =====
Colombian market Baleno was introduced to public in November 2016 at the Salón del Automóvil de Bogotá (Bogotá Motor Show), the hatchback is marketed as the Baleno Esteem. It is offered in two trim levels; GL and GLX. Only 1.4-litre engine available and mated either 5-speed manual for both trims or 4-speed automatic transmission for GLX. The GLX trim has six airbags and rear disc brakes.

In March 2020, the facelifted model arrived in the country and renamed to Baleno Cross. The GLX trim was deleted, leaving GL as the only trim. The car is now marketed with crossover styling with additional accessories such as roof rack, side body moulding, mud guards and new dual tone 16 inch alloy wheels.

===== Mexico =====
The Baleno was launched in Mexico on 4 June 2021. It is offered in two trim; levels GL and GLX. Powered with a 1.4-litre engine, and mated to either 5-speed manual or GLX only 4-speed automatic transmission.

==== Oceania ====
===== Australia =====
The Baleno was launched in July 2016 with two trim levels; GL with 1.4-litre engine paired with either 5-speed manual or 4-speed automatic transmission and GLX with turbocharged 1.0-litre engine paired with 6-speed automatic transmission. In February 2019, the 1.0-litre turbocharged engine was replaced with 1.4-litre engine and 4-speed automatic transmission from GL trim. The "Series II" Baleno arrived in Australia in August 2019. To avoid the global semiconductor shortage, the 2022 model year Baleno (and Suzuki Australia's entire line-up) received new locally supplied 9-inch touch screen infotainment system without satellite navigation feature in October 2021.

In August 2022, Suzuki Australia introducing a limited edition trim called Shadow Edition. It is based on the GL trim with automatic transmission, black coloured bodykits and 16-inch alloy wheels, which only 300 units are available for sale and more expensive than the loaded GLX trim. Despite being the best seller car of Suzuki Australia (second in its segment behind MG3), the car was discontinued in July 2022 and the remaining stocks are available until the end of the year. The next generation Baleno (which is the same car with some improvements) will not coming to the country because it was not engineered to meet the safer ADR85/00 side impact crashes standard.

===== New Zealand =====
The Baleno was announced in New Zealand on 27 July 2016. It is available in two trim levels; GLX and LTD. The car is only offered with a 1.4-litre engine and paired with either 5-speed manual or 4-speed automatic transmission. A new trim level called RS was launched in June 2017, it comes with 1.0-litre turbocharged engine, 6-speed automatic transmission and rear disc brakes. The RS in New Zealand did not receive the Indian market Baleno RS styling.

The revised Baleno became available in August 2019. The RS trim now comes with LED projector headlights as standard and the deletion of LTD trim. A limited edition based on GLX trim called Baleno SE with additional LED projector headlights and 16 inch alloy wheels from RS plus several exterior accessories was launched in November 2020.

==== Africa ====
===== South Africa =====
The hatchback was launched to the country in November 2016. It was available in two trim levels; GL and GLX. All models were equipped with 1.4-litre petrol engine, paired with either 5-speed manual or 4-speed automatic transmission. The GLX trim received additional features such as LED headlight, six airbags, automatic air conditioning, chrome-finished door handles, leather-wrapped steering wheel, and cruise control.

The facelifted model was announced in October 2019. The electronic stability program (ESP) became standard across the range since September 2020.

=== Toyota Glanza/Starlet ===
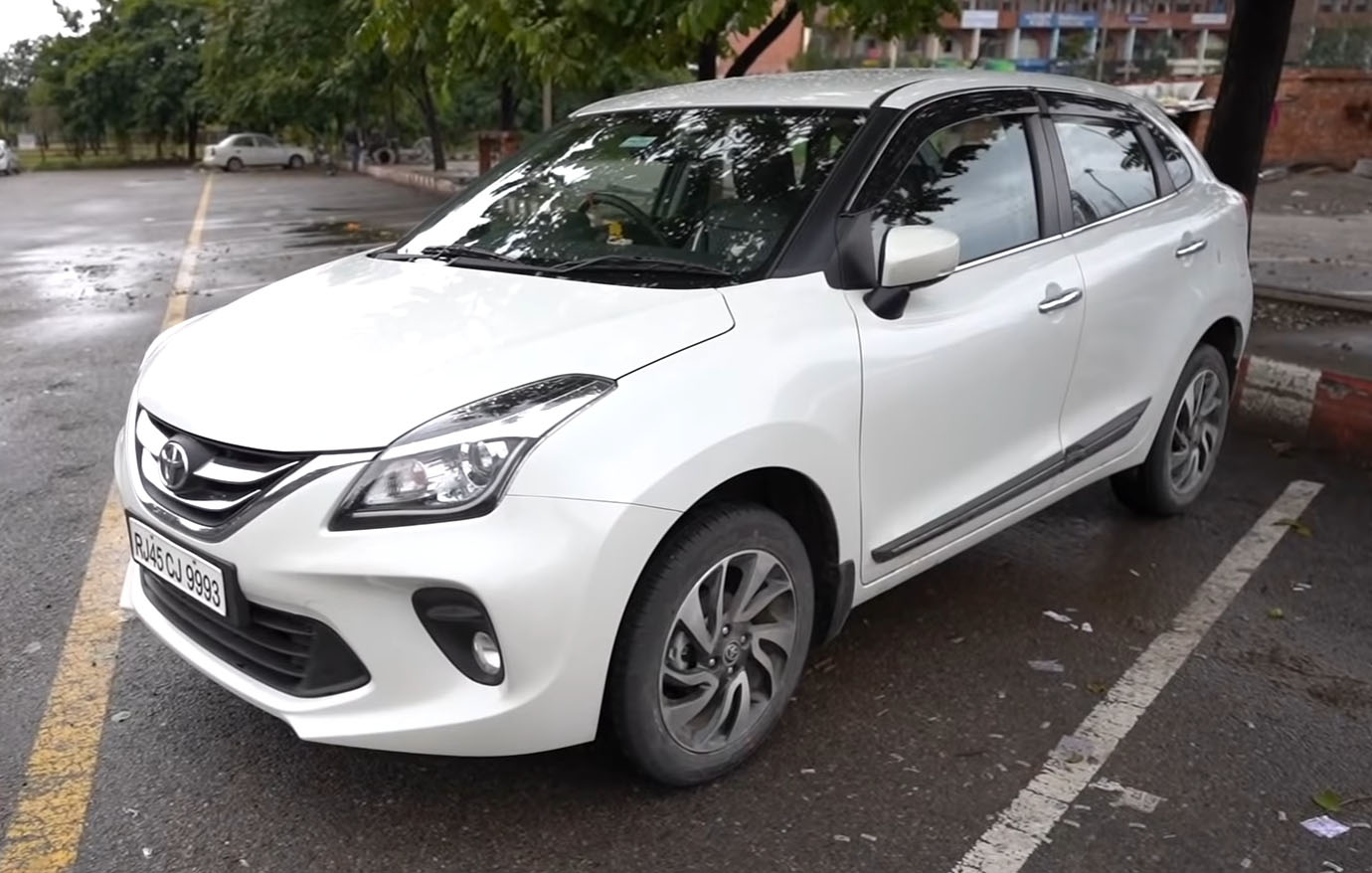
Toyota Glanza (K12M, India), which adopted the facelifted Baleno styling

The facelifted Baleno is sold by Toyota as the Toyota Glanza, which debuted in India on 6 June 2019. The "Glanza" nameplate was previously used for the sports version of the Japanese market P90 series Starlet hatchback. The Glanza is offered in two trim levels - the Glanza G and V based on the Baleno's Zeta and Alpha trims respectively and also powered with the same 1.2-litre K12M/N petrol engines. The Glanza is also sold in Africa under the Starlet nameplate and powered with a 1.4-litre petrol engine.

=== Safety ===
==== Euro NCAP ====
The European market Baleno was crash tested by Euro NCAP in April 2016, receiving three star overall safety rating for the basic version and a four star overall safety rating for the version with the extra "Radar Brake Support" security package. Same result as the Japanese-built Swift, which is also underpinned by the same platform. As standard, it offers six airbags (frontal, side and curtain), ABS with EBD, brake assist, electronic stability program and hill-start assist.

Euro NCAP test results* Suzuki Baleno (standard) (2016)
Test	Points	%
Overall:	3 /5 stars	
Adult occupant:	30.8	80%
Child occupant:	36.1	73%
Pedestrian:	27.6	65%
Safety assist:	3	25%

Euro NCAP test results* Suzuki Baleno (with safety pack) (2016)
Test	Points	%
Overall:	4 /5 stars	
Adult occupant:	32.5	85%
Child occupant:	36.1	73%
Pedestrian:	27.6	65%
Safety assist:	5.3	43%

==== Latin NCAP ====
The base model Latin American market Baleno (2 airbags and no ESC) Latin NCAP 3.0 crash test result was announced in October 2021 (similar to Euro NCAP 2014) and received a zero star rating. Compared to the European market Baleno, the test dummies received more fatal injuries on the chest, neck, knees and child occupants.

Latin NCAP 3.0 test results Suzuki Baleno + 2 Airbags (2021, similar to Euro NCAP 2014)
Test	Points	%
Overall:	0 /5 stars	
Adult occupant:	8.01	20%
Child occupant:	8.36	17%
Pedestrian:	30.75	64%
Safety assist:	3.00	7%

== Second generation (WB2; 2022) ==
Second generation
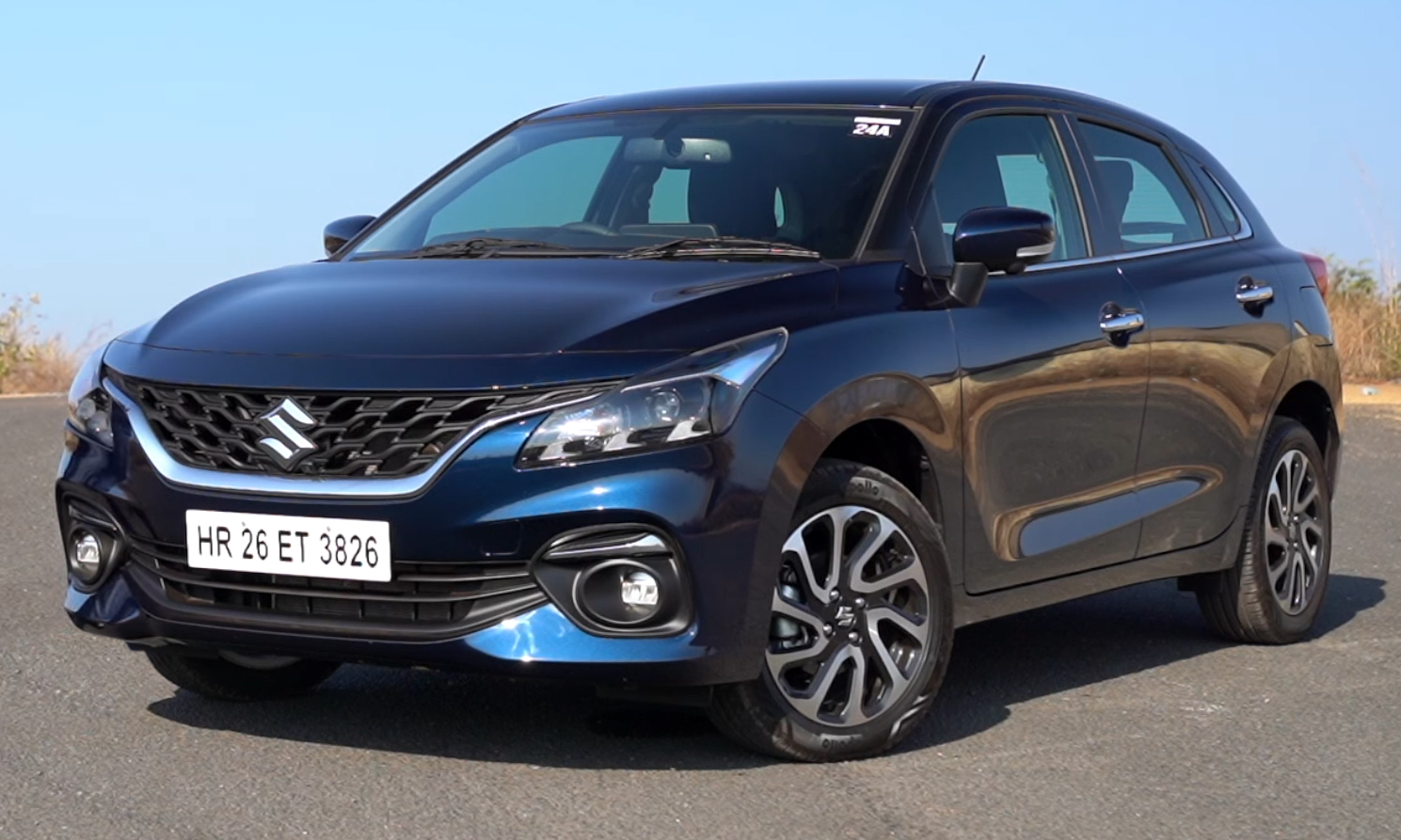
- 2022 Baleno Alpha (India) (pre-facelift)

Overview
- Model code: WB2
- Production: January 2022 – present
- Designer: Koichiro Fukushima

Powertrain
- Engine: Petrol: 1.2 L K12N I4; 1.2 L Z12E I3 (ZC/ZDDDS); 1.5 L K15B I4; Petrol/CNG: 1.2 L K12N I4; 1.2 L Z12E I3 (ZC/ZDDDS)
- Transmission: 5-speed manual; 4-speed automatic; 5-speed AMT

Dimensions
- Wheelbase: 2,520 mm (99.2 in)
- Length: 3,990 mm (157.1 in)
- Width: 1,745 mm (68.7 in)
- Height: 1,500 mm (59.1 in)
- Curb weight: 920–960 kg (2,028–2,116 lb); 1,015–1,030 kg (2,238–2,271 lb) (CNG)

The second-generation Baleno hatchback was first released in India on 23 February 2022. It is continued to be assembled at Suzuki's plant in Ahmedabad and will be exported to Asia, Africa, Middle East and Latin America.

Suzuki stated the hatchback was a full model change, with the marketing name "New Age Baleno", however it uses the previous model's underpinnings with major body shell revisions. The exterior received new body panels, headlights, LED fog lights, tail lights, smaller C-pillar windows, and wheels. For the interior, it comes with redesigned dashboard with a floating 9-inch LCD, gauge cluster, refreshed steering wheel, plus additional new features such as rear air conditioning vents, fast charging USB ports, head-up display, 360° view camera, Amazon Alexa voice assistant support, and improved NVH performance. The handling is also improved with all new suspension, new hydraulic clutch system and larger front disc brakes.

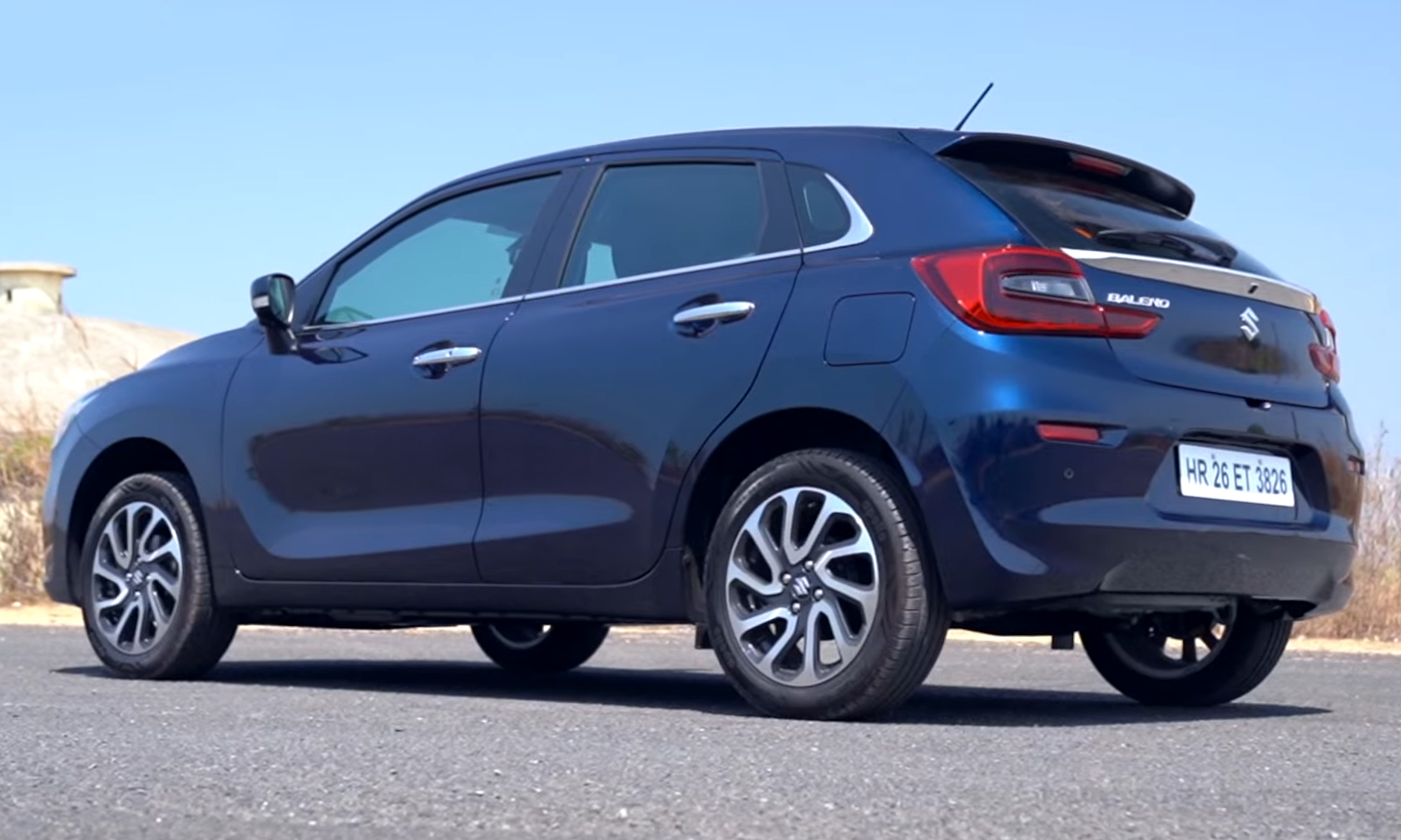
Rear view(pre-facelift)

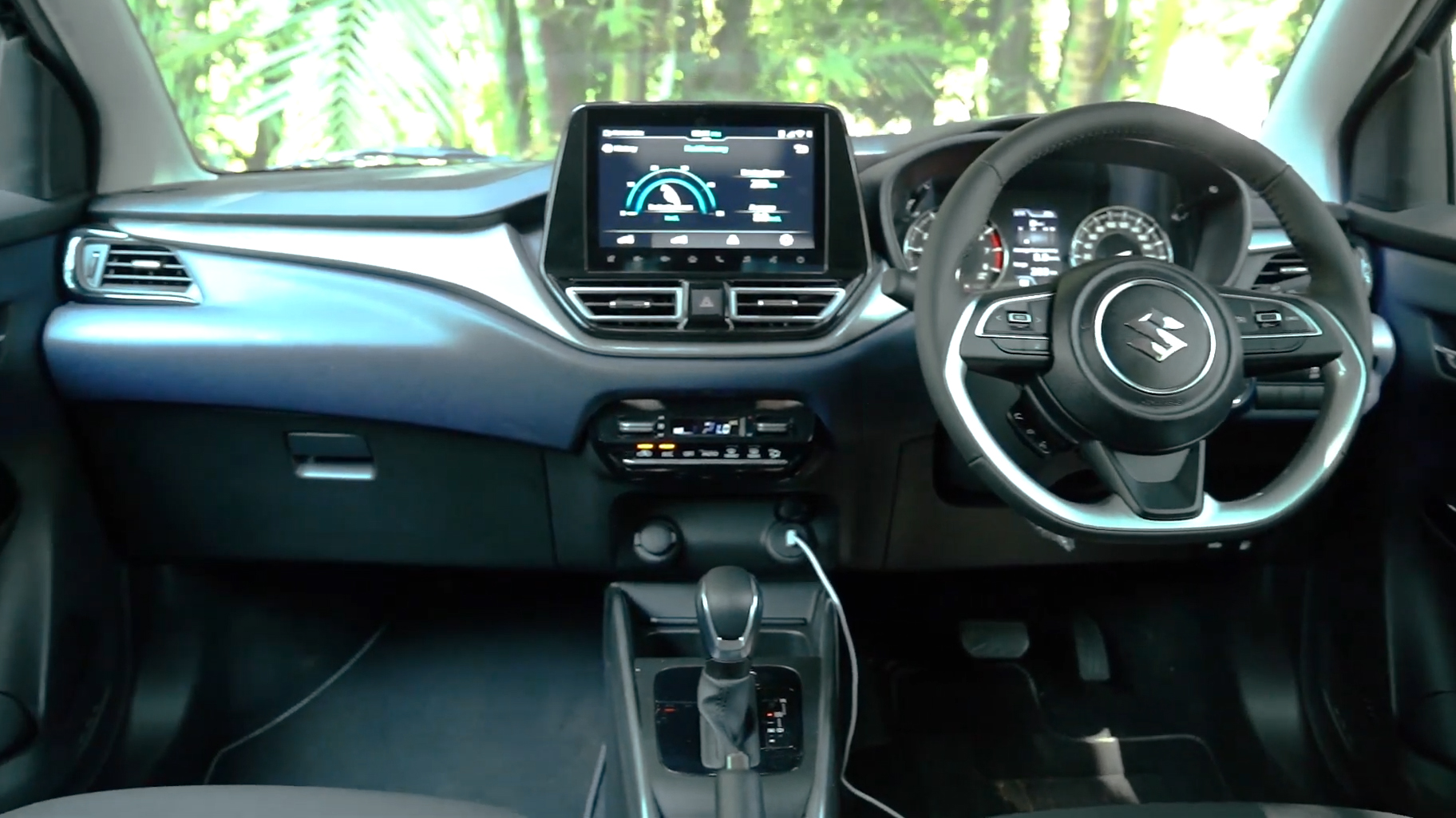
Interior(pre-facelift)

=== Facelift ===
In September 2026, Maruti Suzuki launched the facelifted Baleno in India, starting at ₹6.10 lakh (ex-showroom). Alongside minor design revisions and updated interior safety features, the premium hatchback replaced its previous powertrain with the Swift-borrowed 1.2-litre, 3-cylinder naturally-aspirated petrol engine.

=== Markets ===
==== Asia ====
Maruti Suzuki launched the car in India on 23 February 2022 with the same four trim levels as previous generation; Sigma, Delta, Zeta and Alpha. It is also retained the same 1.2-litre K12N Dualjet petrol engine and 5-speed manual transmission, while the CVT option was replaced with the cheaper AMT unit. All trims come with 6 airbags as standard. The CNG powered model was launched in October 2022. For the 2023 model year, depending on the trim level, the hatchback was updated with new additional convenience and safety features as standard.

The second-generation Baleno hatchback was also launched together with S-Presso in Indonesia on 11 August 2022 at the 29th Gaikindo Indonesia International Auto Show with sole unnamed trim as the previous generation. The car is powered by a new 1.5-litre petrol engine and retained the same 5-speed manual or 4-speed automatic transmission options. A year later at the 30th Gaikindo Indonesia International Auto Show, the hatchback received a bigger 9-inch LCD and 360° view camera feature. Suzuki Indonesia stopped selling Baleno in late 2025 in favor of locally-build Suzuki Fronx.

==== Africa ====
Suzuki South Africa introduced the hatchback in February 2022 and became available later in May. It comes with two trim levels; GL and GLX.

=== Toyota Glanza/Starlet ===
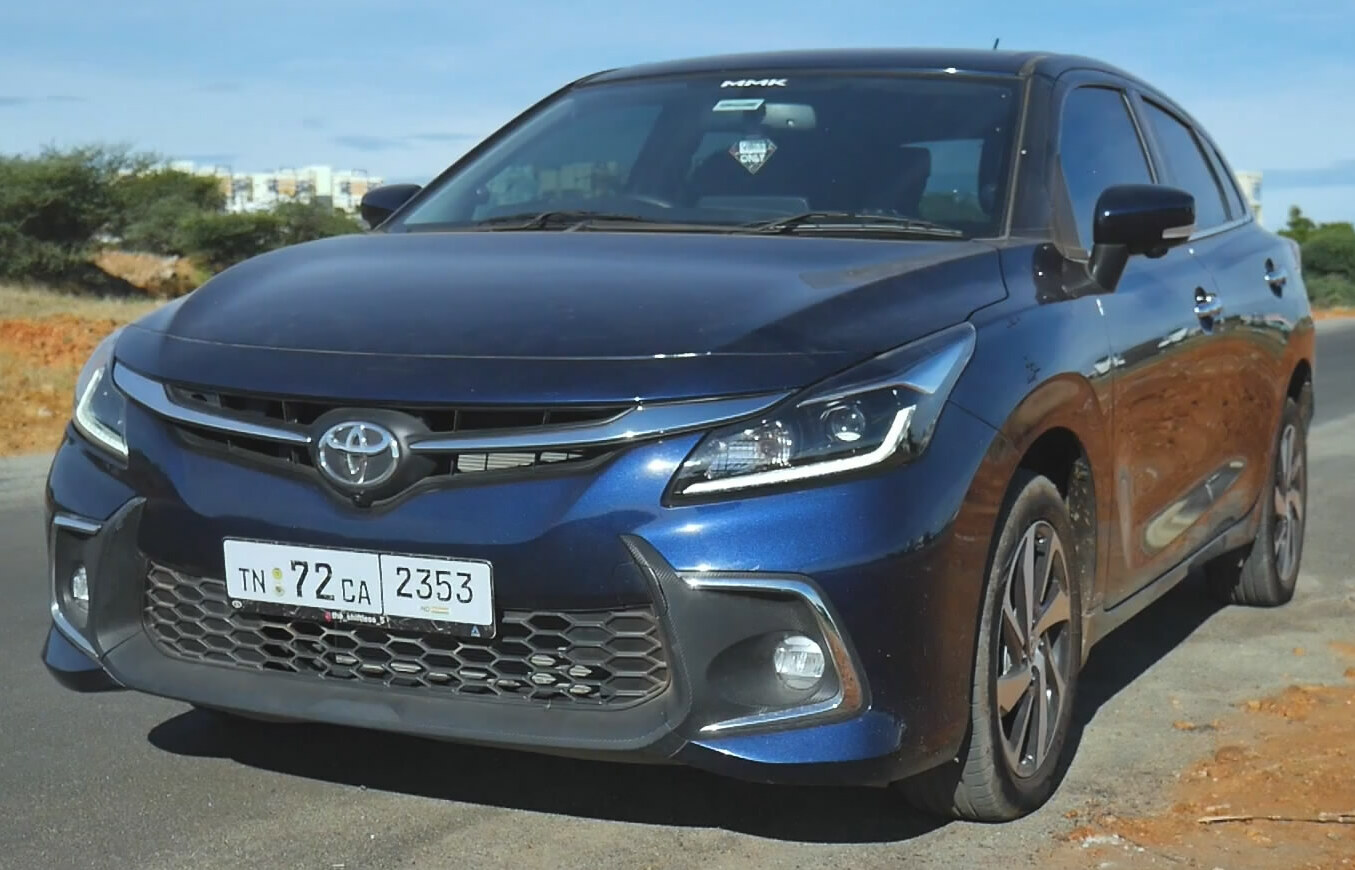
Toyota Glanza (India)

The second-generation Baleno-based Glanza was launched on 15 March 2022 with four trim levels: E, S, G and V. Eight months later, a CNG variant was launched in November 2022. Unlike the previous model, the Glanza received differentiated front fascia, alloy wheels, and dual tone black-beige interior colour. The mechanical and equipment levels are identical to the Baleno.

The second-generation Glanza is also sold in Africa under the Starlet nameplate since May 2022. It is available with three trim levels: Xi, Xs and XR, it is powered by a 1.5-litre petrol engine.

==== Facelift ====
In October 2026, Toyota launched the Glanza facelift in India, featuring a revised exterior fascia, a new 1.2 liter 3-cylinder engine with petrol and CNG transmission options, and advanced tech inclusions like ventilated front seats and an ADAS suite.

=== Powertrain ===
The Baleno along with the Toyota Glanza/Starlet continued to be powered by four-cylinder K-series petrol engines. Indian market models received the similar 1.2-litre K12N Dualjet petrol engine from the previous model, mated to a 5-speed manual transmission or new 5-speed AMT "AGS" option which replaced the more expensive CVT unit. The export model is equipped with a larger 1.5-litre K15B petrol engine replacing the old 1.4-litre K14B unit. It is paired with either 5-speed manual or 4-speed automatic from previous generation.

Type	Engine code	Displacement	Power	Torque	Transmission	Layout	Calendar years
Petrol	K12N Dualjet	1,197 cc (1.2 L) I4	66 kW (89 hp; 90 PS) @ 6,000 rpm	113 N⋅m (11.5 kg⋅m; 83.3 lb⋅ft) @ 4,400 rpm	5-speed manual; 5-speed automated manual	FWD	2022–2026
Petrol	Z12E	1,197 cc (1.2 L) I3	Petrol: 66 kW (89 hp; 90 PS) @ 6,000 rpm	Petrol: 113 N⋅m (11.5 kg⋅m; 83.3 lb⋅ft) @ 4,400 rpm	5-speed manual; 6-speed automated manual	FWD	2026-present
Petrol/CNG	K12N Dualjet	1,197 cc (1.2 L) I4	Petrol: 66 kW (89 hp; 90 PS) @ 6,000 rpm CNG: 51.3 kW (69 hp; 70 PS) @ 6,000 rpm	Petrol: 112.4 N⋅m (11.5 kg⋅m; 82.9 lb⋅ft) @ 4,400 rpm CNG: 101.8 N⋅m (10.4 kg⋅m; 75.1 lb⋅ft) @ 4,300 rpm	5-speed manual	FWD	2022-2026 (only available in India)
Petrol/CNG	Z12E	1,197 cc (1.2 L) I3	Petrol: 66 kW (89 hp; 90 PS) @ 6,000 rpm CNG: 57 kW (76 hp; 77 PS) @ 6,000 rpm	Petrol: 113 N⋅m (11.5 kg⋅m; 83.3 lb⋅ft) @ 4,400 rpm CNG: 98.5 N⋅m (10.0 kg⋅m; 72.6 lb⋅ft) @ 4,300 rpm	5-speed manual	FWD	2026-present (only available in India)
Petrol	K15B	1,462 cc (1.5 L) I4	77 kW (103 hp; 105 PS) @ 6,000 rpm	138 N⋅m (14.1 kg⋅m; 102 lb⋅ft) @ 4,400 rpm	5-speed manual; 4-speed automatic	FWD	2022–present (except India)

=== Safety ===
==== Bharat NCAP ====
In 2025, the Maruti Suzuki Baleno rated 4 stars in adult and 3 stars in child in Bharat NCAP (based on Latin NCAP 2016)

Bharat NCAP test results Maruti Baleno gasoline (2 AB) (2025, based on Latin NCAP 2016)
Test	Score	Stars
Adult occupant protection	24.04/32.00	4 /5 stars
Child occupant protection	34.81/49.00	3 /5 stars

For 6 airbags

Bharat NCAP test results Maruti Baleno gasoline (6 AB) (2025, based on Latin NCAP 2016)
Test	Score	Stars
Adult occupant protection	26.52/32.00	4 /5 stars
Child occupant protection	34.81/49.00	3 /5 stars

==== Latin NCAP ====
Latin NCAP 3.5 test results Suzuki Baleno + 6 Airbags (2025, similar to Euro NCAP 2017)
Test	Points	%
Overall:	2 /5 stars	
Adult occupant:	31.75	79%
Child occupant:	32.08	65%
Pedestrian:	23.17	48%
Safety assist:	25.00	58%

Latin NCAP 3.5 test results Suzuki Baleno + 2 Airbags (2025, similar to Euro NCAP 2017)
Test	Points	%
Overall:	1 /5 stars	
Adult occupant:	16.91	42%
Child occupant:	32.08	65%
Pedestrian:	23.17	48%
Safety assist:	25.00	58%

==== Global NCAP ====
Global NCAP awarded the South African market Toyota Starlet zero stars for adult occupant protection in May 2026, due to poor protection of the head and chest in side impact testing. The model rated was discontinued at the time of publication of the result, resulting in Toyota South Africa issuing a cease-and-desist letter to AA South Africa. Global NCAP revealed in early August 2026 that they were testing updated units with side and curtain airbags, purchased with their own funds.

Global NCAP 2.5 test results (#SaferCarsForAfrica campaign) Toyota Starlet (outgoing) + 2 Airbags (2026, similar to Latin NCAP 2019)
Test	Score	Stars
Adult occupant protection	0.00/34.00	0 /5 stars
Child occupant protection	29.33/49.00	3 /5 stars

Global NCAP 2.5 test results (Africa) Toyota Starlet (2026, similar to Latin NCAP 2019)
Test	Score	Stars
Adult occupant protection	27.97/34.00	4 /5 stars
Child occupant protection	29.33/49.00	3 /5 stars

== Motorsport ==
In 2016, a Baleno was modified by Suzuki Motorsport Italia to compete in "Rally di Roma Capitale" in Italy. The car is powered by a 1.0-litre turbocharged three-cylinder petrol engine and modified to meet R1B class specifications.

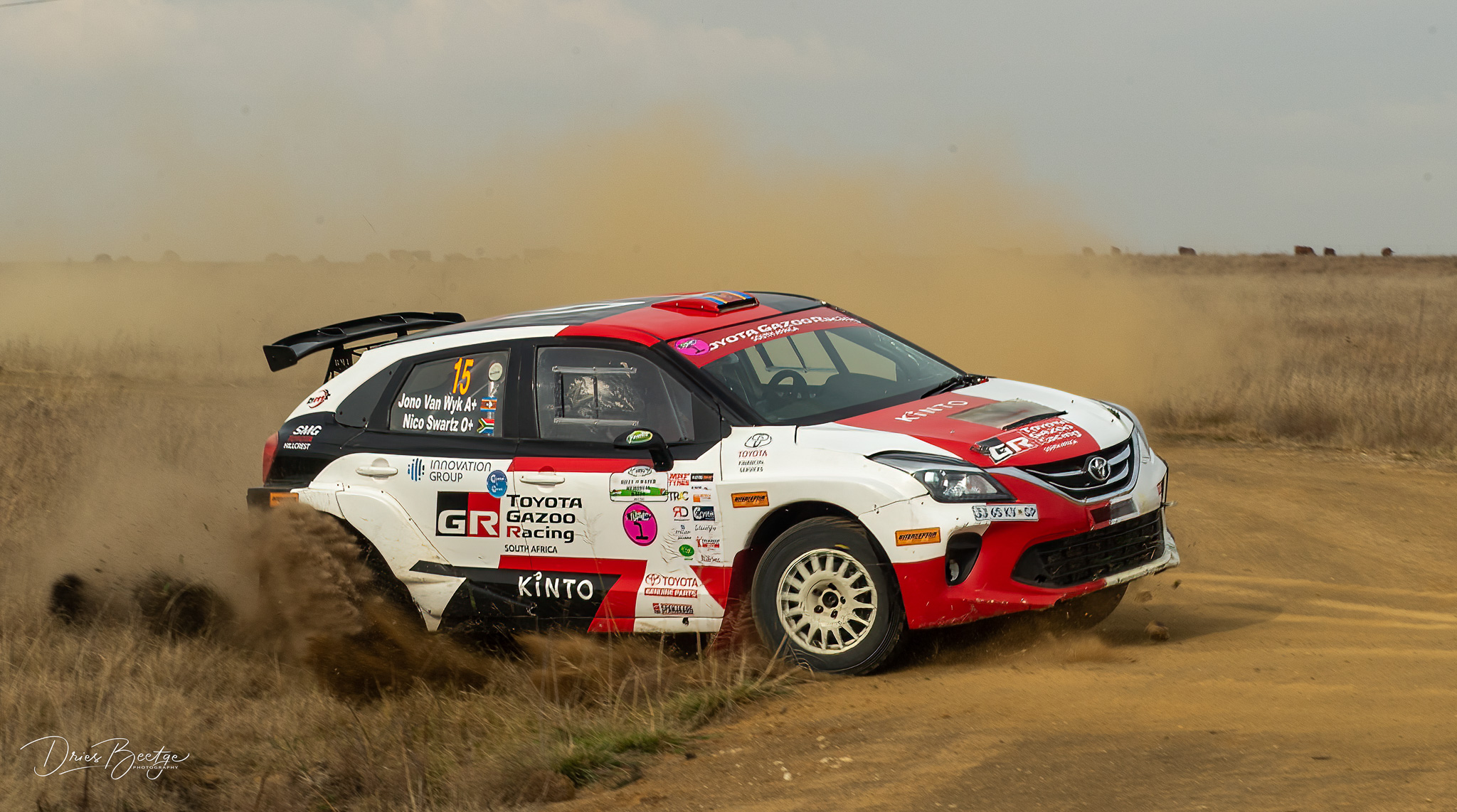
Baleno based-Starlet NCR1 rally car

Toyota Gazoo Racing South Africa modified a Baleno-based Starlet to participate in 2022 South African National Rally Championship and is competing in Class NRC1. The locally developed rally car is powered by a 2.0-litre turbocharged four-cylinder petrol engine, which drives all four wheels via a sequential gearbox. The car driven by Guy Botterill and co-driver Simon Vacy-Lyle finished 2nd place in the championship standing, by winning 4 of 12 rounds.

== Sales ==
Year	India		South Africa		Europe (Note: Car sales statistics are from the following countries: Austria, Belgium, Cyprus, Czech Republic, Denmark, Estonia, Finland, France, Germany, Great Britain, Greece, Hungary, Iceland, Ireland, Italy, Latvia, Lithuania, Luxembourg, Netherlands, Norway, Poland, Portugal, Romania, Slovakia, Slovenia, Spain, Sweden and Switzerland)	Indonesia	Australia	Mexico	Chile
Year	Baleno	Glanza	Baleno	Starlet	Europe	Indonesia	Australia	Mexico	Chile
2015	23,875								
2016	107,066				14,521				
2017	175,209				18,518	2,140			
2018	210,236				15,530	5,453			
2019	183,863	17,946			14,429	5,216	2,277		
2020	153,986	20,676	581	3,352	2,296	2,421	3,326		
2021	172,237	26,326	570	12,103		2,724	3,896	1,435	5,470
2022	185,665	33,185	2,832	12,921		1,198	6,124	2,200	
2023	193,989	50,537	6,004	15,713		2,824		3,317	4,788
2024	172,094		7,311	14,129		3,672		3,339	4,765
2025						1,956		2,024	
