= Suzuki Fronx =

Subcompact crossover SUV

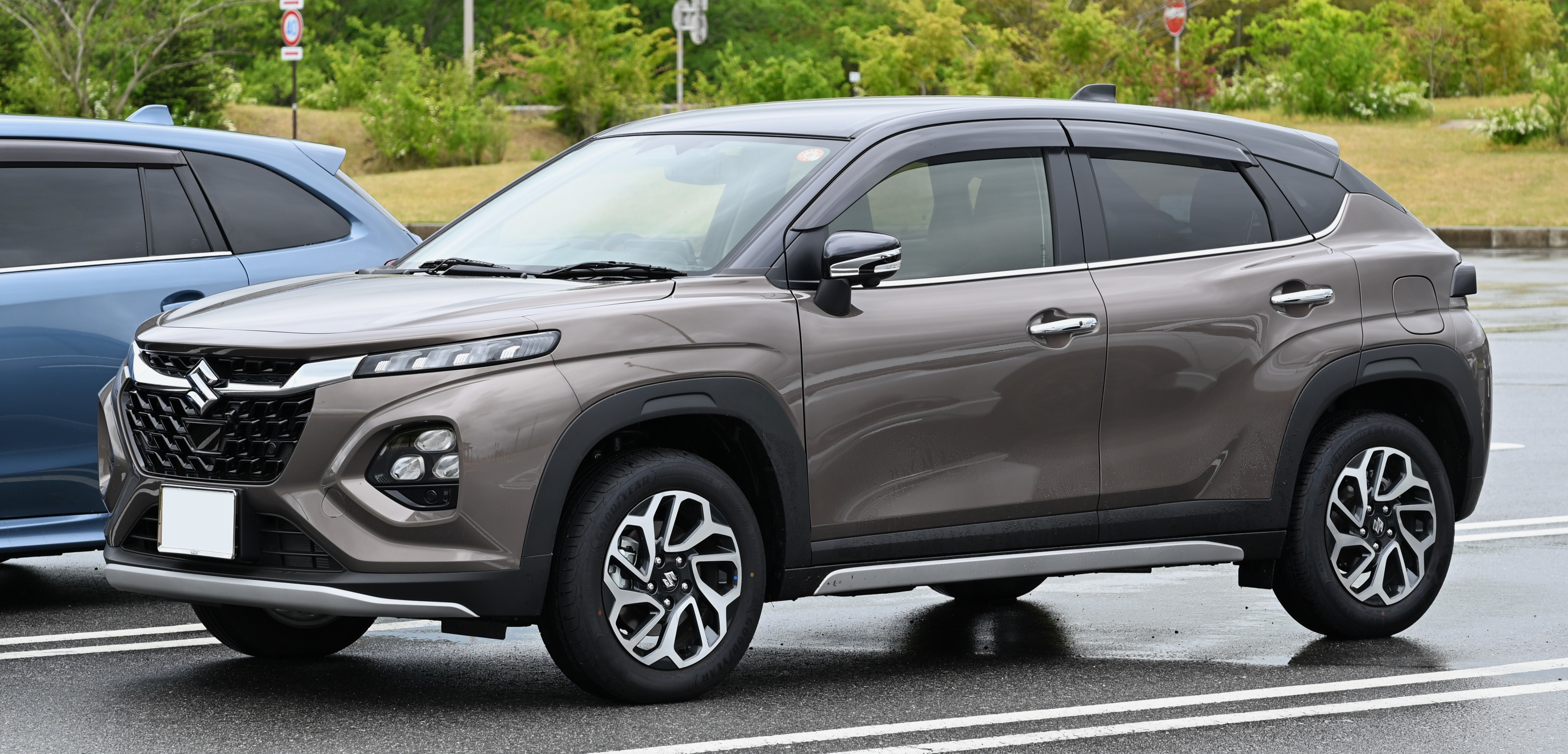
- 2024 Suzuki Fronx (Japan)

Overview
- Manufacturer: Suzuki
- Model code: WDB3S; WEB3S
- Also called: Toyota Urban Cruiser Taisor (India); Toyota Starlet Cross (Africa)
- Production: 2023–present
- Assembly: India: Ahmedabad (Suzuki Motor Gujarat); Indonesia: Bekasi (Suzuki Indomobil Motor Cikarang plant); Pakistan: Karachi (Pak Suzuki Motor Company)
- Designer: Koichiro Fukushima, Masahiro Kato, Vidyasagar Gupta, Abhishek Bhasker and Mohammad Arif

Body and chassis
- Class: Subcompact crossover SUV (B)
- Body style: 5-door SUV
- Layout: Front-engine, front-wheel-drive; Front-engine, four-wheel-drive (Japan)
- Platform: HEARTECT B platform
- Related: Suzuki Baleno; Suzuki Swift

Powertrain
- Engine: Petrol: 1.0 L K10C Boosterjet turbo I3; 1.2 L K12N Dualjet I4; 1.5 L K15B I4; 1.5 L K15C I4 mild hybrid; Petrol/CNG: 1.2 L K12N Dualjet I4
- Transmission: 5-speed manual; 5-speed AMT; 4-speed automatic; 6-speed automatic
- Hybrid drivetrain: Mild hybrid (1.0 L turbo & K15C 1.5 L)

Dimensions
- Wheelbase: 2,520 mm (99.2 in)
- Length: 3,995 mm (157.3 in)
- Width: 1,765 mm (69.5 in)
- Height: 1,550 mm (61.0 in)
- Curb weight: 965–1,060 kg (2,127–2,337 lb)

The Suzuki Fronx (Japanese: スズキ・フロンクス, Hepburn: Suzuki Furonkusu) is a subcompact crossover SUV (B-segment) produced by the Japanese manufacturer Suzuki since 2023. It was first produced through its Indian subsidiary Maruti Suzuki, and is also assembled in Indonesia and Pakistan. It is based on the Baleno, and positioned below the Brezza.

The Fronx name is a portmanteau of "Frontier Next", which was trademarked by Suzuki in 2014. There were rumors in 2015 that Suzuki's newest car at that time would be named Fronx, however it was later introduced as the Baleno.

== Overview ==
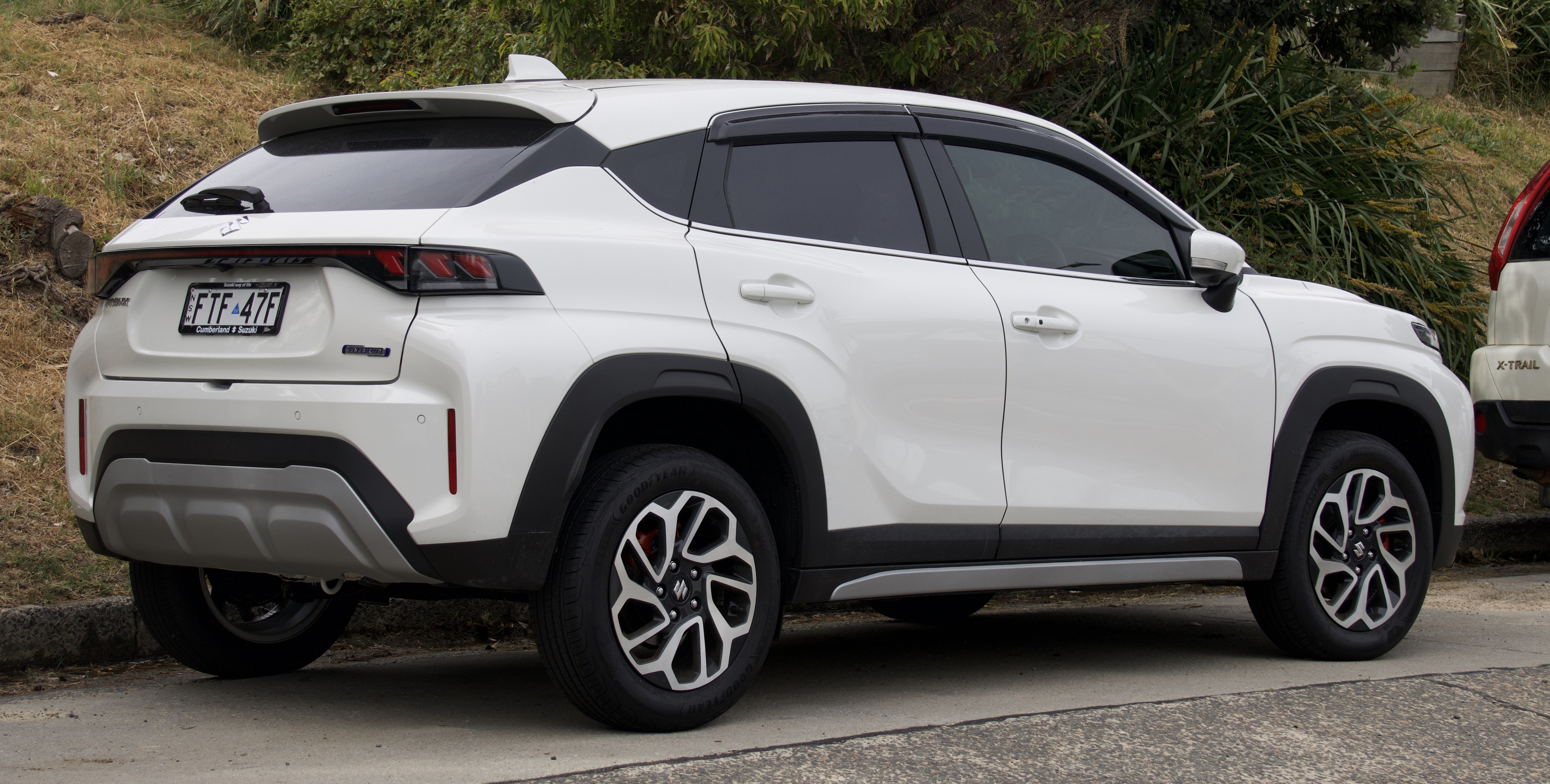
Rear view

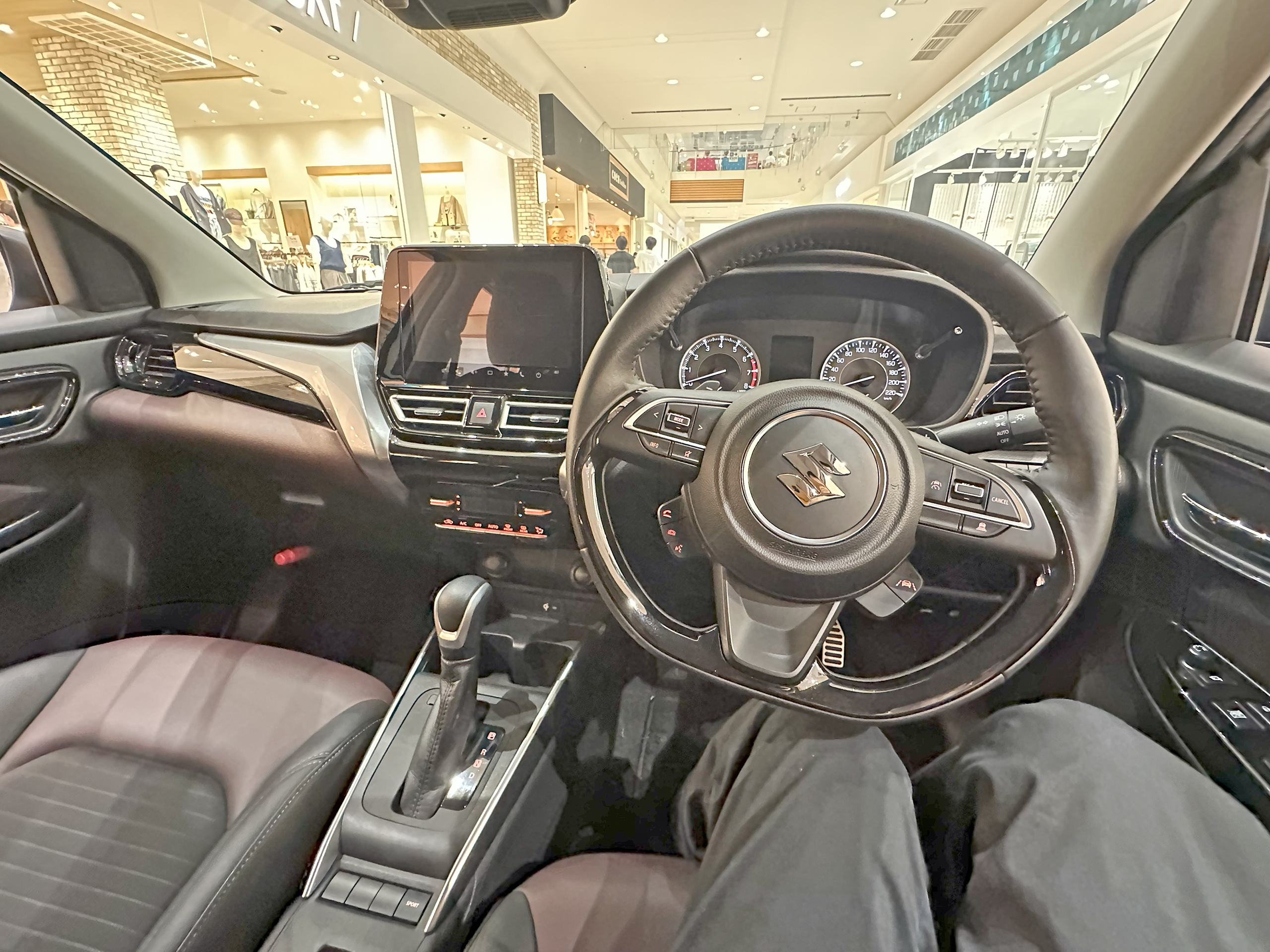
Interior

Presented in January 2023 at the Auto Expo in India, the Fronx for the Indian market is exclusively available at the Nexa dealership chain reserved for high-end Maruti Suzuki models. It is Suzuki's second model in the sub-4 metre SUV segment in India after the Brezza, and occupies the lower bracket of India's sub-4 metre tax structure due to its smaller engine.

According to a development manager of the Fronx, the vehicle was conceived from the idea to create an SUV that is widely accepted by the market while using existing resources, which is the Baleno platform. The development process included ideas such as making the tailgate more upright to emphasize the interior space, but the company chose to embrace a coupe-style rear with a tilted tailgate. Compared to the Baleno, the bonnet has been heightened, the body panels reshaped, and the rear pillars are tilted forward. It has a 308-litre boot, 10 litres smaller than the Baleno due to a slightly raised loading floor. The ground clearance is also raised by 20 mm (0.8 in) to 210 mm (8.3 in), a result of a modified suspension and larger 195/60 R16 tyres. Maruti Suzuki claims it had spent 9 billion rupees in the development of the Fronx.

The Fronx has been exported from India since July 2023. Planned export markets include the Middle East, Latin America, Africa, Australia and Japan. For export markets, the 1.5-litre K15C four-cylinder engine with the Smart Hybrid system is available.

== Toyota Urban Cruiser Taisor / Starlet Cross ==
Toyota unveiled the rebadged Fronx, named Urban Cruiser Taisor, in India on 3 April 2024, featuring a new grille design and redesigned rent headlights and taillights. In India, it is offered in E, S, S+, G and V. The former three are powered by the 1.2-litre petrol engine, while the G and V use the 1.0-litre petrol engine and the E grade uses both petrol and CNG engine. The deliveries began in May 2024 and 13,496 units were sold till the end of September.

The model went on sale in South Africa as the Toyota Starlet Cross in July 2024. The Starlet Cross replaced the Toyota Urban Cruiser, a rebadged Suzuki Vitara Brezza. It is available with two trim levels: XS and XR, it is powered by the 1.5-litre K15B petrol engine paired to either a 5-speed manual or 4-speed automatic.

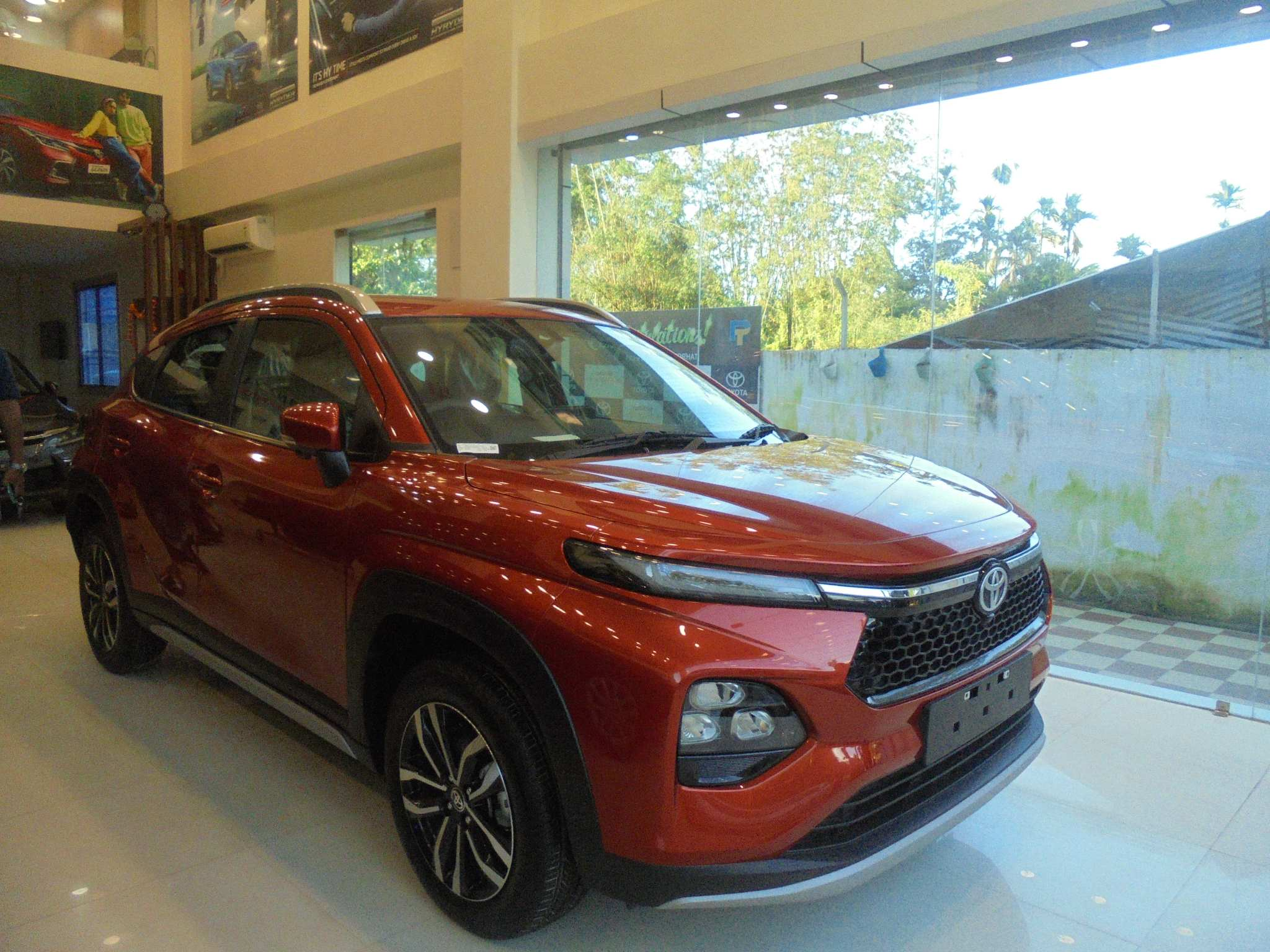
Toyota Urban Cruiser Taisor (India)

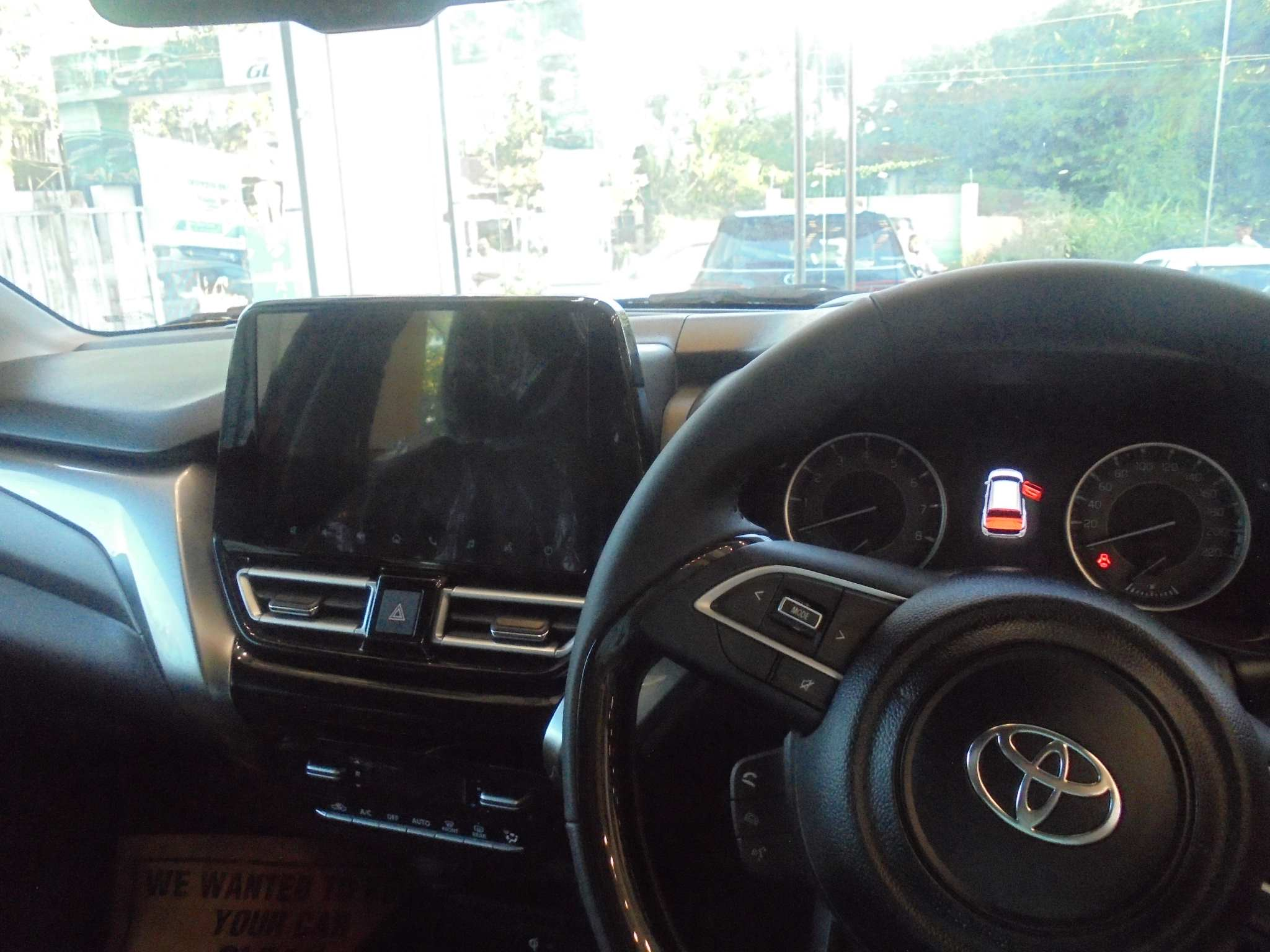
Interior

== Markets ==
=== Asia ===
==== India ====
In January 2023, Maruti Fronx was unveiled for the first time in the world in Auto Expo India, In the Indian market, the Fronx is offered in five variants: Sigma, Delta, Delta+, Zeta and Alpha. The Alpha and Zeta trims are exclusively powered by the 1.0-litre turbocharged mild hybrid K10C three-cylinder petrol engine producing 100 bhp and 143 Nm of torque while Sigma and Delta trims use the 1.2-litre naturally aspirated K12N four-cylinder petrol engine producing 90 bhp and 113 Nm of torque. A CNG option is available in the Sigma and Delta grades. The Delta+ trim is the only trim available in both 1.0L and 1.2L engine options.

==== Indonesia ====
Before its release, this car appeared as a teaser on IIMS 2025. The Indonesian market Fronx was revealed on 1 May 2025, and was launched on 28 May 2025. Assembled locally at Cikarang plant. It is powered by either by the 1.5-litre K15B or the 1.5-litre K15C mild-hybrid petrol engine.

The Indonesian market available in three grade levels: GL (non-Hybrid with K15B engine), GX and SGX (Hybrid with K15C engine). Only Suzuki Fronx GL and GX Hybrid are offered with 5-speed manual transmission, while all grade levels are offered with automatic transmission (4-speed automatic for GL and 6-speed automatic for GX and SGX Hybrid). In August 2026, the SGX Hybrid Kuro variant was added to the line-up as the flagship variant, features black exterior.

==== Japan ====
The Japanese market Fronx was introduced in July 2024. Imported from India, and like the Australian market, the Japanese model comes with an electronic parking brake, 5-lug wheels, a four-wheel drive option and interior colour scheme alterations. It is powered by the 1.5-litre K15C mild hybrid petrol engine.

==== Laos ====
The Fronx was launched in Laos on 10 October 2025. It is available in the sole GLX trim, powered by a 1.5-litre K15C mild hybrid powertrain.

==== Malaysia ====
The Fronx was launched in Malaysia on 18 November 2025. Imported from Indonesia, It is available in the sole hybrid trim, powered by a 1.5-litre K15C mild hybrid powertrain. In June 2026, the Sport model was introduced to the line-up.

==== Pakistan ====
The Fronx was launched in Pakistan on 6 May 2026, with sales starting the same day. It is locally assembled by Pak Suzuki Motor Company at its plant in Karachi, making Pakistan the third production base for the Fronx after India and Indonesia.

The Pakistani market Fronx is offered in GL 5MT, GL 4AT and GLX 6AT grades. The GL variants are powered by the 1.5-litre K15B petrol engine, paired with either a 5-speed manual or 4-speed automatic transmission, while the GLX uses the 1.5-litre K15C mild-hybrid petrol engine paired with a 6-speed automatic transmission. The GLX is the first Pak Suzuki-produced model equipped with a mild-hybrid system.

==== Philippines ====
The Fronx was introduced in the Philippines in June 2025 during the Suzuki Philippines' 50th anniversary celebration, pre-orders opened on 20 August 2025, and was launched in the Philippines on 12 September 2025. It is available with three trim levels: GL, GLX and SGX. The GL trim use the 1.5-litre K15B petrol engine, while the GLX and SGX trims uses the 1.5-litre K15C mild hybrid petrol engine.

==== Thailand ====
The Fronx was launched in Thailand on 25 September 2025. Imported from Indonesia, it is available with three trim levels: GL with the 1.5-litre K15B petrol engine, while GLX and GLX Plus with the 1.5-litre K15C mild hybrid powertrain.

==== Vietnam ====
The Fronx was launched in Vietnam on 17 October 2025. Imported from Indonesia, it is available with three trim levels: GL with the 1.5-litre K15B petrol engine, GLX while and GLX Plus with the 1.5-litre K15C mild hybrid powertrain.

=== Mexico ===
The Fronx went on sale in Mexico on 25 August 2023, in the sole GLX Boostergreen variant powered by the 1.5-litre K15C mild hybrid petrol engine.

=== Middle East ===
The Fronx was launched in the GCC on 16 July 2023, powered by the 1.5-litre K15C mild hybrid petrol engine, available in GL and GLX grades.

=== Oceania ===
==== Australia ====
The Fronx was launched in Australia on 29 July 2025, in the sole Hybrid variant imported from India, powered by the 1.5-litre K15C mild hybrid petrol engine. Unlike other export markets (excluding Japan), the Australian model comes with several changes and additions compared to the Indian model such as an electronic parking brake and 5-lug wheels.

==== New Zealand ====
The Fronx was launched in New Zealand on 7 July 2025, in the sole GLX variant, powered by the 1.5-litre K15C mild hybrid petrol engine.

=== South Africa ===
The Fronx was launched in South Africa on 15 August 2023, with two trim levels: GL and GLX; it is powered by the 1.5-litre K15B petrol engine paired to either a 5-speed manual or 4-speed automatic.

== Powertrain ==
The Fronx is powered by a 1.0-litre, 3-cylinder K10C Boosterjet turbocharged petrol engine rated at 73.6 kW (99 hp; 100 PS), with a 48V mild hybrid system. This engine option is available with a 5-speed manual and a 6-speed Aisin torque converter automatic transmission. Another engine option is the less expensive 1.2-litre K12N Dualjet petrol engine rated at 66 kW (89 hp; 90 PS), mated to a 5-speed manual or a 5-speed automated manual gearbox.

Type	Engine code	Displacement	Power	Torque	Electric motor	Battery	Transmission	Layout	Calendar years
Petrol	K12N Dualjet	1,197 cc (1.2 L) I4	66 kW (89 hp; 90 PS) @ 6,000 rpm	113 N⋅m (11.5 kg⋅m; 83.3 lb⋅ft) @ 4,400 rpm	-	-	5-speed manual; 5-speed automated manual	FWD	2023–present
Petrol/CNG	K12N Dualjet	1,197 cc (1.2 L) I4	Petrol: 66 kW (89 hp; 90 PS) @ 6,000 rpm CNG: 57 kW (76 hp; 77 PS) @ 6,000 rpm	Petrol: 113 N⋅m (11.5 kg⋅m; 83.3 lb⋅ft) @ 4,400 rpm CNG: 98.5 N⋅m (10.0 kg⋅m; 72.6 lb⋅ft) @ 4,300 rpm	-	-	5-speed manual	FWD	2023–present (India only)
Petrol mild hybrid	K10C Boosterjet	998 cc (1.0 L) turbocharged I3	73.6 kW (99 hp; 100 PS) @ 5,500 rpm	147.6 N⋅m (15.1 kg⋅m; 109 lb⋅ft) @ 2,000–4,500 rpm	ISG	Lithium-ion	5-speed manual; 6-speed automatic	FWD	2023–present
Petrol	K15B	1,462 cc (1.5 L) I4	77 kW (103 hp; 105 PS) @ 6,000 rpm	138 N⋅m (14.1 kg⋅m; 102 lb⋅ft) @ 4,400 rpm	-	-	5-speed manual; 4-speed automatic	FWD	2023–present (except India)
Petrol mild hybrid	K15C	1,462 cc (1.5 L) I4	76 kW (102 hp; 103 PS) @ 6,000 rpm	137 N⋅m (14.0 kg⋅m; 101 lb⋅ft) @ 4,400 rpm	ISG	Lithium-ion	5-speed manual; 6-speed automatic	FWD	2023–present (except India)
Petrol mild hybrid	K15C	1,462 cc (1.5 L) I4	76 kW (102 hp; 103 PS) @ 6,000 rpm	137 N⋅m (14.0 kg⋅m; 101 lb⋅ft) @ 4,400 rpm	ISG	Lithium-ion	5-speed manual; 6-speed automatic	AWD	2024–present (Japan)

== Safety ==
ASEAN NCAP test results Suzuki Fronx (2025)
Test	Points
Overall:	5 /5 stars
Adult occupant:	36.71
Child occupant:	15.27
Safety assist:	15.71
Motorcyclist Safety:	10.00

Crash tests conducted by ANCAP demonstrated a failure in the rear seatbelt retractor, resulting in "an uncontrolled seatbelt release where the rear dummy became unrestrained, allowing it to strike the rear of the front seat." However, ANCAP noted that this failure alone did not solely contribute to the one-star rating, the Fronx had already scored zero points in the full-width frontal impact test before the seatbelt failure occurred, including zero points for both the six-year-old and 10-year-old child occupant dummies. "It is ANCAP’s view that adult and child passengers should not travel in the rear seats of the Suzuki Fronx until the reason for the failure has been determined and relevant rectifications have been carried out."

In December 2025, Suzuki announced a recall of the Fronx in Australia due to the results of crash testing. A total of 324 units are affected.

ANCAP test results Suzuki Fronx (2025, aligned with Euro NCAP)
Test	Points	%
Overall:	1 /5 stars	
Adult occupant:	19.30	48%
Child occupant:	20.06	40%
Pedestrian:	41.39	65%
Safety assist:	10.03	55%

== Sales ==
Year	India	Indonesia		Mexico	Japan
Year	India	Petrol	Hybrid	Mexico	Japan
2023	94,393			384	
2024	156,235			2,483	5,267
2025	179,894	1,856	10,458	4,090	19,721
