= Eurostar (disambiguation) =

Eurostar or Eurostars may refer to:

== Railways ==
- Eurostar Group, holding company
  - Eurostar, a brand for international train services between London, Paris, Brussels, Amsterdam and Cologne
  - Eurostar International Limited (EIL), the operator of the Eurostar services between London and continental Europe
  - British Rail Class 373, an electric multiple unit train specially built for providing the Eurostar services to and from London
- Eurostar Italia, former domestic train services in Italy

== Aerospace ==
- Evektor SportStar and EuroStar, ultralight aircraft
- Eurostar (satellite bus), a series of spacecraft manufactured by EADS Astrium (and formerly Matra Marconi Space)
- EuroStar, Turkish Star TV's European channel for Turks lived in Europe

== Entertainment ==
- Eurostar (roller coaster), a travelling roller coaster in Germany
- Eurostar, a team of supervillains from the Champions (role-playing game)

== Music ==
- "Eurostar", 2023 song by Ninho
- "Eurostar", 2024 song by Nemo

== Road vehicles ==
- Eurostar Automobilwerk, a former assembly plant of Chrysler in Graz, Austria
- Iveco EuroStar, heavy duty dump trucks
- Eurostar, the coach (autobus) brand of the Shaanxi Automobile Group
- Bohse Eurostar, a car model
- Kia EuroStar, the name used in Taiwan for the first generation of the Kia Picanto range of city cars

== Sport ==
- FIBA EuroStars, annual basketball event
- Eurostars (team), women's ultimate (frisbee) team

== Other ==
- Eurostar, the logo used to show participation in the Eurostar
