= Eurostars (team) =

Elite European Ultimate women's team

Team "EuroStars" is an Elite European Ultimate (formerly "Ultimate frisbee") women's team formed from over 10 nations each year to challenge the top North American teams in the "Americus Pro Cup" and promote the European women's game. The EuroStars provide an opportunity for these world class players to play in a strong team, learn about other cultures and promote female European talent. Founded in 2017 by captain Rebecca "Bex" Forth. EuroStars Tour were shared in 6 simultaneous clinics in 6 different European countries. The "You’re a Star" clinics will happen each spring to increase outreach.

Americus Pro Cup has been run by American Ultimate Disc League (AUDL) and EuroStars since 2017. AUDL and EuroStars entered into a three-year partnership in 2018.

== Pro Cup name ==
The name "Americus" is from the Latin name of Amerigo Vespucci (1454-1512); a feminine Latin form of his name was given to the continent of America.

== Cup format ==
During Americus Pro Cup tournament team EuroStars are scheduled to play seven matches with strongest North American women Ultimate clubs.

Pro Cup tour follows official World Flying Disc Federation (WFDF) rules. One game takes 100 minutes or until team reaches 15 points.

=== Pro Cup point system ===
wWin by 1 = 1 Pro Cup point
win by 2 or 3 = 2 Pro Cup points
win by 4+ = 3 Pro Cup points.

Team that has the greatest number of Pro Cup points after the last game in the season will win the "Americus Pro Cup" trophy.

== 2019 season ==
=== Game results ===
Date	Opponent	Result	Points received	Total
08.13	Wildfire	15-14	+1	1
08.15	Riot	15-12	+2	3
08.17	Fury	15-12	+2	5
08.20	Phoenix	10-15	0	5
08.22	Brute Squad	15-11	+3	8
08.25	Nemesis	15-7	+3	11
08.27	Heist	15-6	+3	14

Team Europe: 14 points
Team Americas: 3 points

=== Team roster ===
Number	Player	Country
4	Grazyna Chlebicka	(Poland)
7	Ines Bringel	(Portugal)
8	Lāsma Kublicka	(Latvia)
9	Betty Schnedl	(Austria)
10	Barbora Kundelytė	(Lithuania)
17	Anna Gerner	(Germany)
18	Aline Mondiot	(France)
19	Maja Lindroth	(Sweden)
22	Amelia Kenneth	(United Kingdom)
23	Bex Forth (C)	(United Kingdom)
28	Sarah Tosnerova	(Czech Republic)
33	Paulina Dul	(Poland)
42	Levke Walczak	(Germany)
43	Sarah Melvin	(Republic of Ireland)
44	Dina Dumanskaia	(Russia)
91	Alisa Tizik	(Russia)

== 2018 season ==
=== Game results ===
Date	Opponent	Result	Points received	Total
08.14	Heist	15-12	+2	2
08.16	Riot	15-12	+2	4
08.18	Fury	10-15	0	4
08.21	Ozone	15-10	+3	7
08.23	Brute Squad	8-15	0	7
08.25	6ixers	15-12	+2	9
08.28	Scandal	15-7	+3	12

Team Europe: 12 points
Team Americas: 6 points

=== Team roster ===
Number	Player	Country
1	Laura Farolfi	(Italy)
2	Nici Prien	(Germany)
7	Sarah Eklund	(Sweden)
8	Lāsma Kublicka	(Latvia)
11	Katey Forth	(United Kingdom)
16	Inês Bringel	(Portugal)
17	Olivia Hauser	(Switzerland)
18	Yannicka Kappelmann	(Germany)
22	Paula Baas	(Netherlands)
23	Bex Forth (C)	(United Kingdom)
25	Luci Otal	(Spain)
31	Maya Mileck	(Denmark)
32	Fran Scarampi	(Luxembourg)
43	Sarah Melvin	(Republic of Ireland)
44	Dina Dumanskaia	(Russia)
61	Isa Prada	(Spain)

== 2017 season ==
=== Game results ===
Opponents	Result	Points received	Total
Bent	15-10	+3	3
Scandal	9-15	0	3
Brute Squad	13-15	0	3
Riot Seattle	8-11	0	3
Underground	11-3	+3	6
Fury	10-11	0	6
Nightlock	10-11	0	6
Molly Brown	12-15	0	6
Heist	15-7	+3	9

Team Europe: 9 points
Team Americas: 11 points

=== Team roster ===
Number	Player	Country
0	Betty Schnedl	(Austria)
1	Laura Farolfi	(Italy)
2	Nici Prien	(Germany)
5	Anneli Andersson	(Sweden)
6	Annika Lindqvist	(Sweden)
7	Sarah Eklund	(Sweden)
9	Jackie Verralls	(United Kingdom)
11	Katey Forth	(United Kingdom)
17	Olivia Hauser	(Switzerland)
22	Paula Baas	(Netherlands)
23	Bex Forth (C)	(United Kingdom)
30	Essi Inkinen	(Finland)
31	Maya Mileck	(Denmark)
32	Fran Scarampi	(Luxembourg)
34	Ulla Kiili	(Finland)
91	Alisa Tizik	(Russia)
