= Kia Picanto =

City car

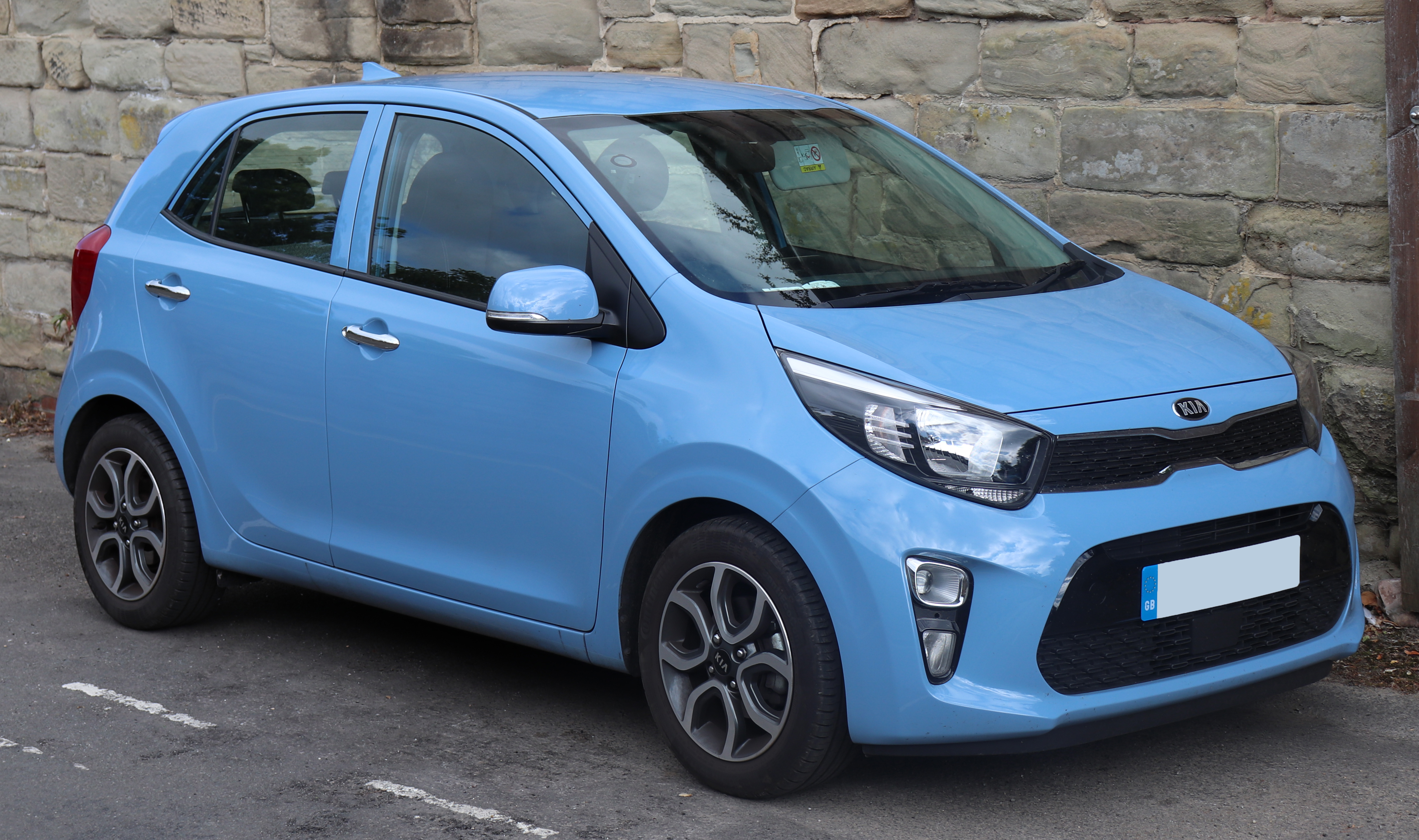
- 2018 Kia Picanto

Overview
- Manufacturer: Kia Corporation
- Also called: Kia Morning (South Korea and Taiwan)
- Production: 2003–present

Body and chassis
- Class: City car
- Layout: Front-engine, front-wheel-drive

Chronology
- Predecessor: Kia Visto

The Kia Picanto is a city car that has been produced by the South Korean car manufacturer, Kia, since 2003. Other names of the car include Kia Morning (Korean: 기아 모닝, romanized: Gia Moning) in South Korea, Hong Kong, Taiwan (first two generations) and Chile, Kia EuroStar in Taiwan (first generation), Kia New Morning in Vietnam and the Naza Suria or Naza Picanto in Malaysia (first generation). The Picanto is primarily manufactured at the Donghee joint-venture plant in Seosan, South Korea, though some countries locally assemble complete knock-down versions of the car.

The vehicle has been developed in compliance with the "light car" (Korean: 경차, romanized: Gyeongcha) category in South Korea which offers tax incentives for vehicles with exterior dimensions below 3,600 mm (141.7 in) in length and 1,600 mm (63.0 in) in width.

== Name origin ==
The name Picanto relates to the Spanish and Italian words picante/piccante, meaning "spicy".

The Korean’s version name "Morning" may trace its origin from the "Morning Calm", as a reference to South Korea's tradition. Since 1886, when a book written by Percival Lowell obtained large success in the United States in narrating the history of Korea, the country started to be internationally referred as "the Land of Morning calm", and its ruling monarchy the Joseon, became known abroad as the "Morning Dynasty".

== First generation (SA; 2003) ==
First generation
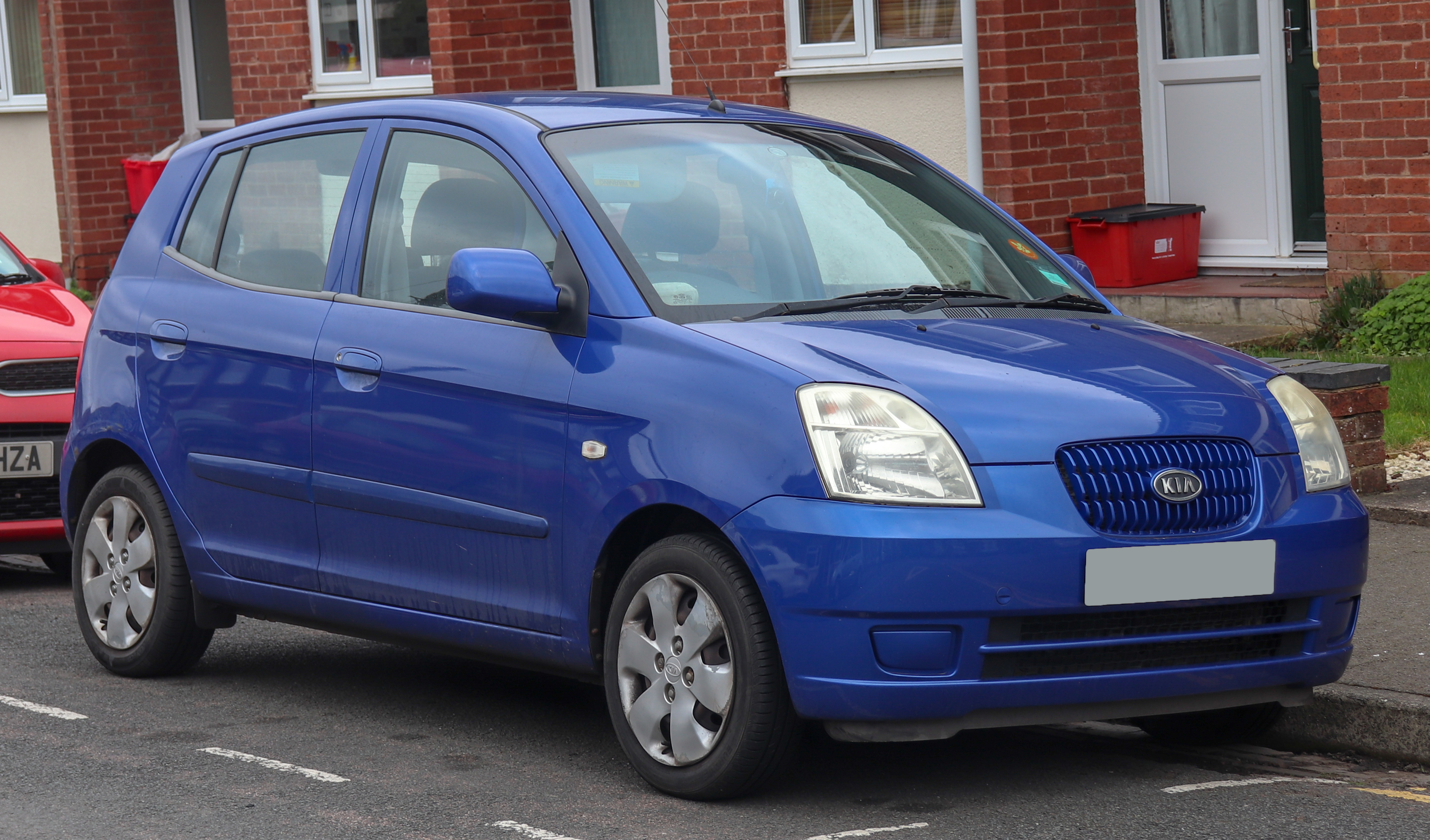
- 2004 Kia Picanto LX (pre-facelift) (UK)

Overview
- Model code: SA
- Also called: Kia Morning; Kia Picanto Morning; Kia Euro Star (Taiwan); Kia Eko Taxi (Colombia); Naza Suria (Malaysia); Naza Picanto (Malaysia)
- Production: September 2003–2011
- Assembly: South Korea: Seosan (Donghee); Malaysia: Gurun (Naza); Vietnam: Chu Lai (Thaco Kia)

Body and chassis
- Body style: 5-door hatchback
- Platform: Hyundai-Kia SA
- Related: Hyundai Atos; Hyundai Getz; Hyundai i10 (PA)

Powertrain
- Engine: petrol: 999 cc Epsilon I4; 1086 cc Epsilon I4; 1248 cc Kappa I4; petrol/LPG: 999 cc Epsilon I4; diesel: 1120 cc U I3
- Transmission: 5-speed manual; 4-speed automatic

Dimensions
- Wheelbase: 2,370 mm (93.3 in)
- Length: 3,535 mm (139.2 in)
- Width: 1,595 mm (62.8 in)
- Height: 1,480 mm (58.3 in)
- Curb weight: 836–945 kg (1,843–2,083 lb)

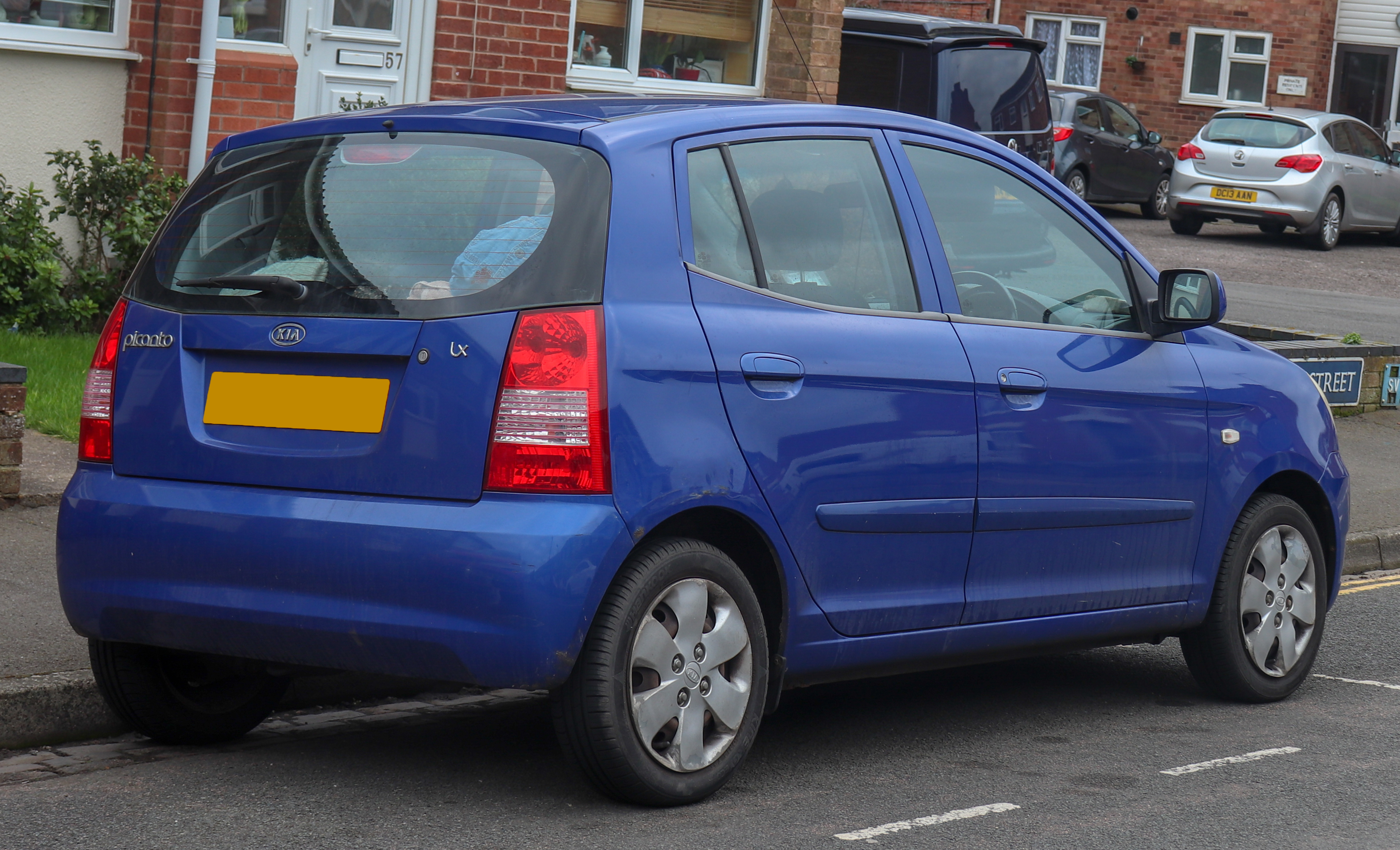
2004 Kia Picanto LX (pre-facelift) (UK)

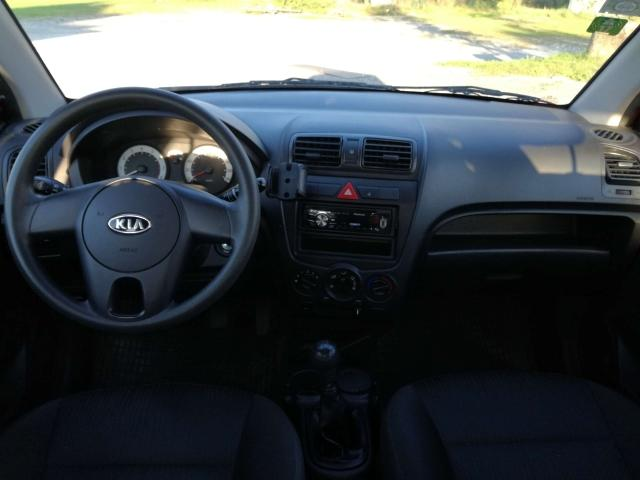
Interior

The first generation Picanto was revealed at the 2003 Frankfurt Motor Show. It was based on a shortened platform of the Hyundai Getz and was 3,495 mm (137.6 in) long, with a five-door hatchback body style. The car was available with a choice of two petrol engines: a 1.0-litre, with 61 hp (45 kW) and 86 N⋅m (63 lb⋅ft), or a 1.1-litre, with 65 hp (48 kW) and 97 N⋅m (72 lb⋅ft), both with multi-point injection. In Europe, a 1.1-litre three-cylinder diesel engine (based on the Kia Cerato's 1.5-litre four-cylinder unit) was also available, with direct injection and a variable geometry turbocharger, the power reaching 75 hp (55 kW) and a torque of 153 N⋅m (113 lb⋅ft). The petrol engines had a combined consumption of 5.1 L/100 km (55 mpg_{‑imp}) and 5.2 L/100 km (54 mpg_{‑imp}) respectively, while the diesel used 4.4 L/100 km (64 mpg_{‑imp}). An automatic gearbox (with torque converter) was optional for the petrol units. In some countries, it was sold with a 1.2-litre engine, also used on the newer Hyundai i10.

To increase its appeal in the European market, the Picanto was equipped with such features as CD player with MP3 audio playback, air conditioning, front and patented rear electric windows, remote central locking, and electric mirrors. These features were advertised in a short-lived campaign starring Marcus Grönholm.

In Malaysia, the Picanto is rebadged and sold as the locally-assembled Naza Suria. On 30 October 2009, the Suria was updated, and had its name changed to Naza Picanto.

=== Safety ===
Euro NCAP test results for a LHD, 5-door hatchback variant on a 2004 registration:

Euro NCAP test results Kia Picanto (2004)
Test	Score	Rating
Adult occupant:	17	3 /5 stars
Child occupant:	37	4 /5 stars
Pedestrian:	6	1 /4 stars

=== 2007 and 2009 facelift ===
The Picanto received a facelift in 2007. Among the minor changes were the light clusters (front and rear), a new bumper and front grille. For the UK and Cyprus markets, the indicator stalk was switched to the opposite side. For the Italian market, a new bi-fuel LPG version debuted alongside the 1.0 L and 1.1 L engines. This model also saw a change in power steering configuration from hydraulic to electric.

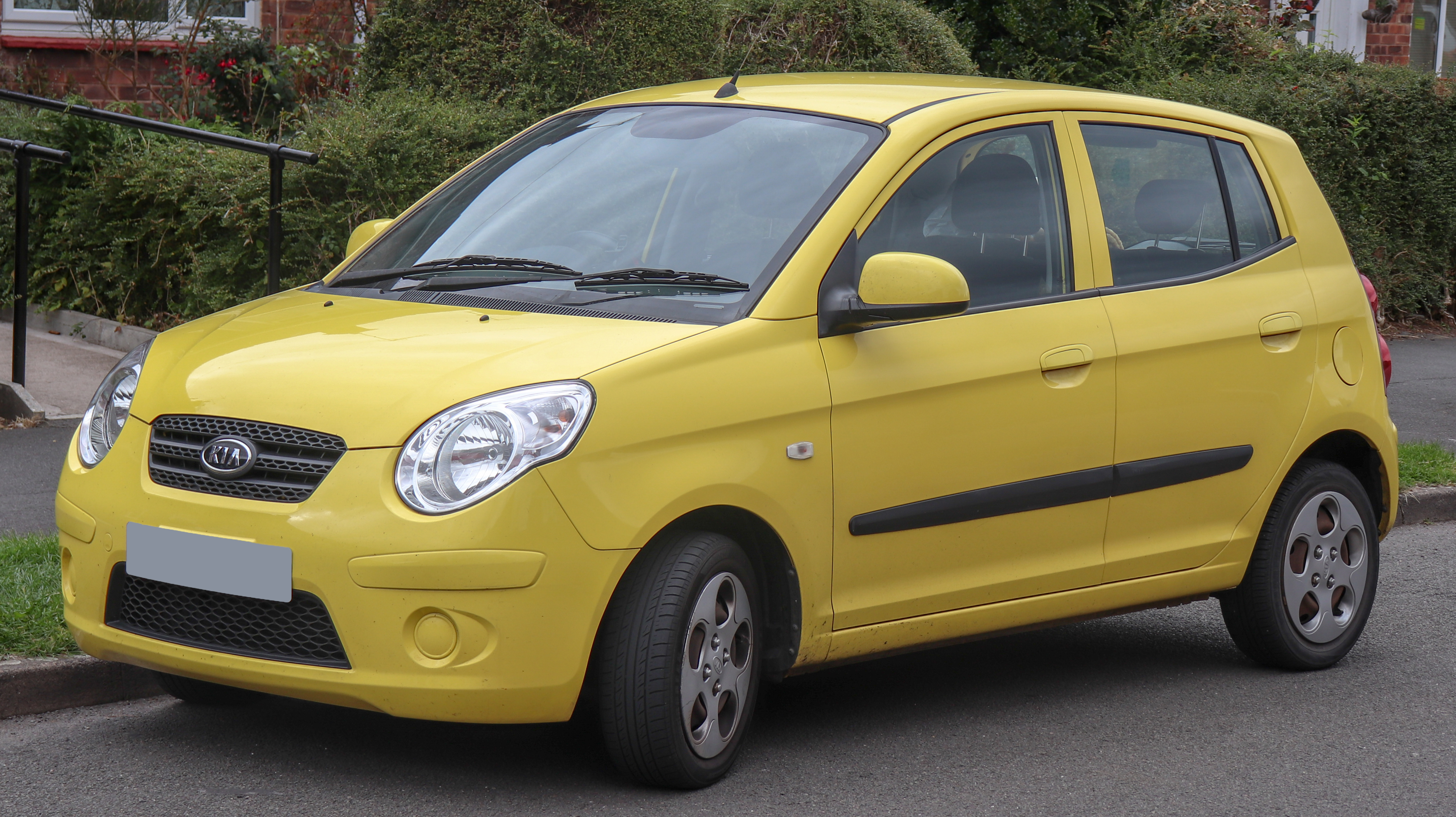
First facelift

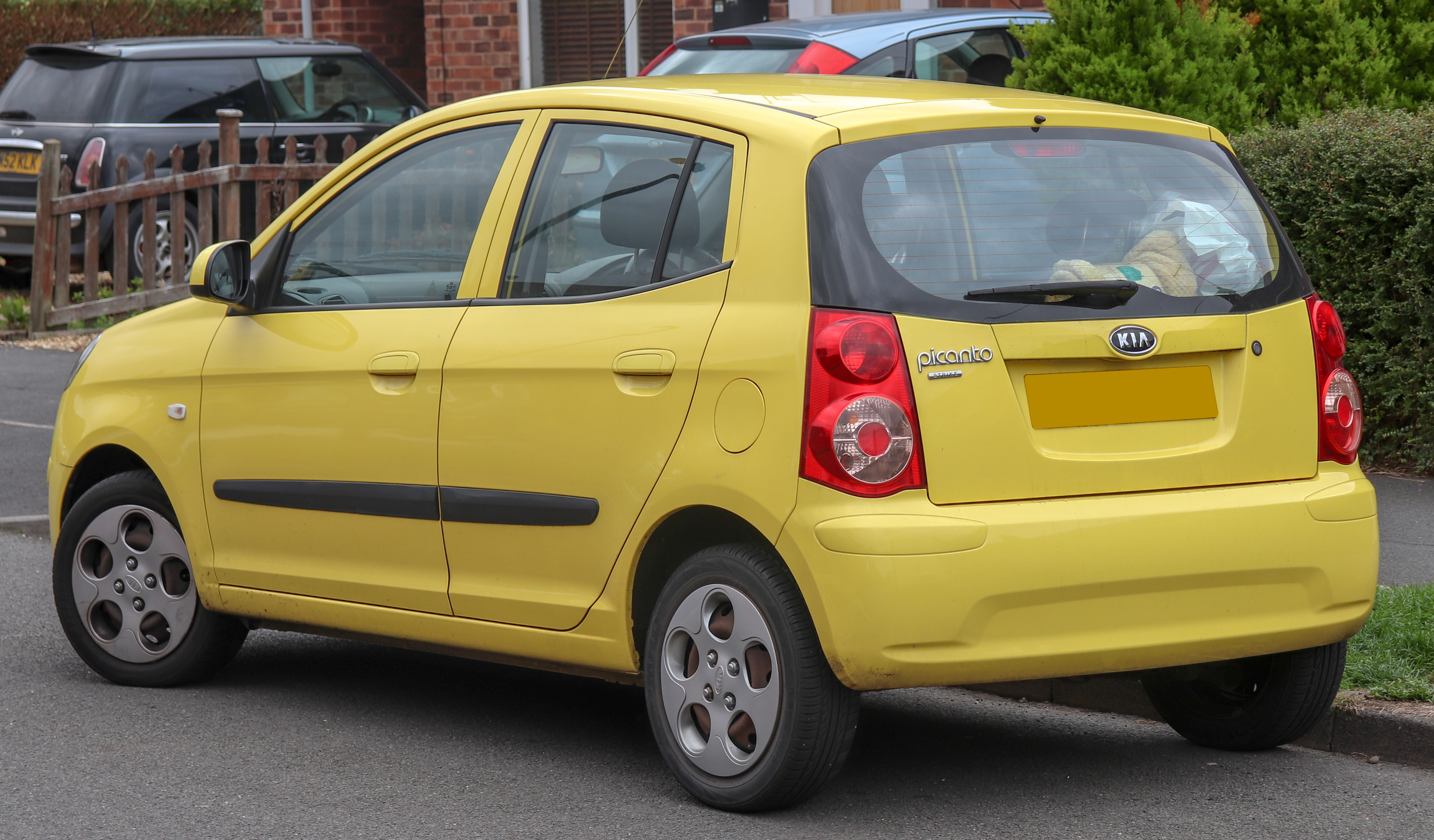
First facelift

In 2009, the Picanto received some minor interior and exterior changes, including a new front fascia that incorporates the 'tiger nose' grille. This facelifted model would not be exported to Europe.

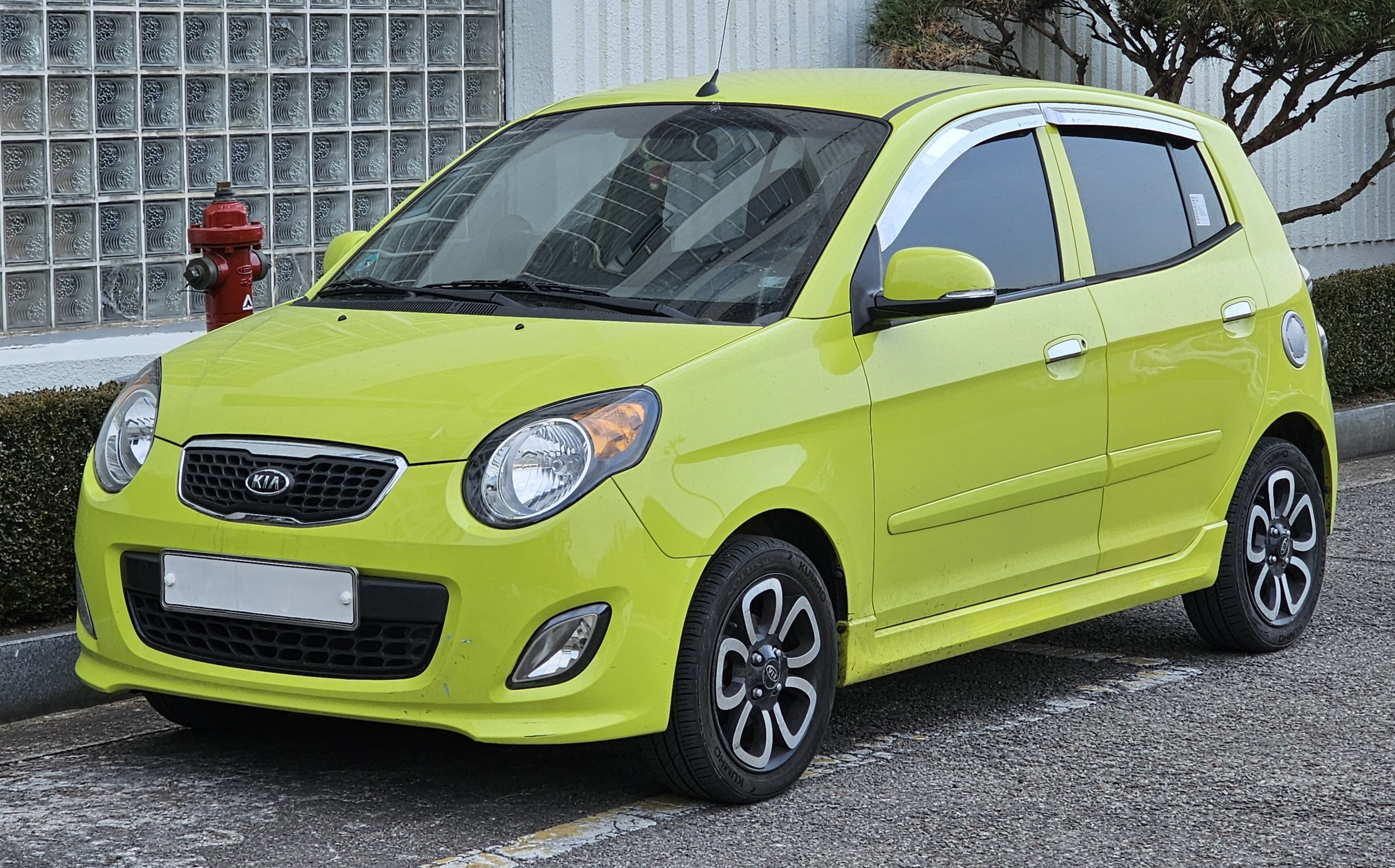
Second facelift

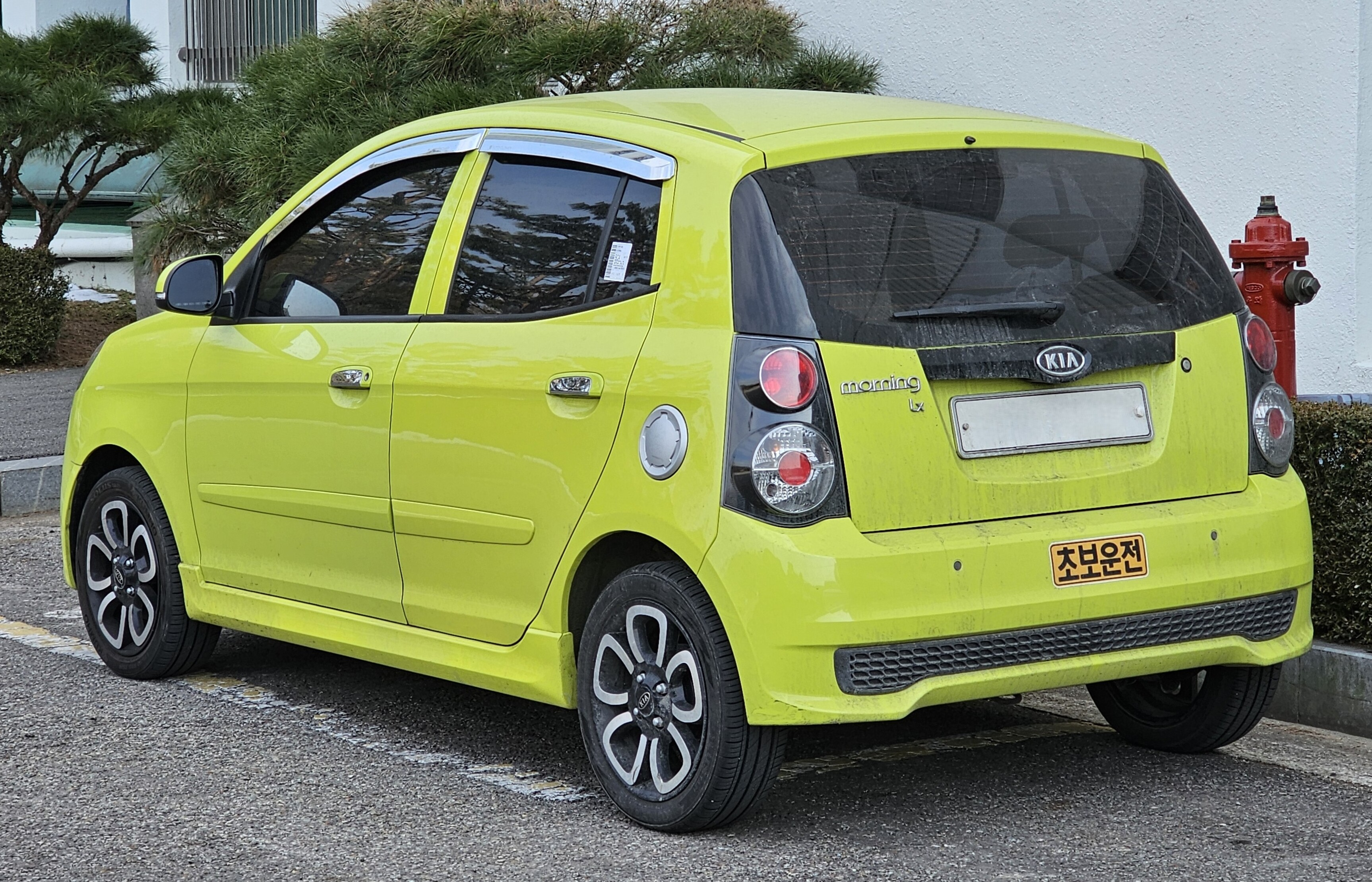
Second facelift

== Second generation (TA; 2011) ==
Second generation
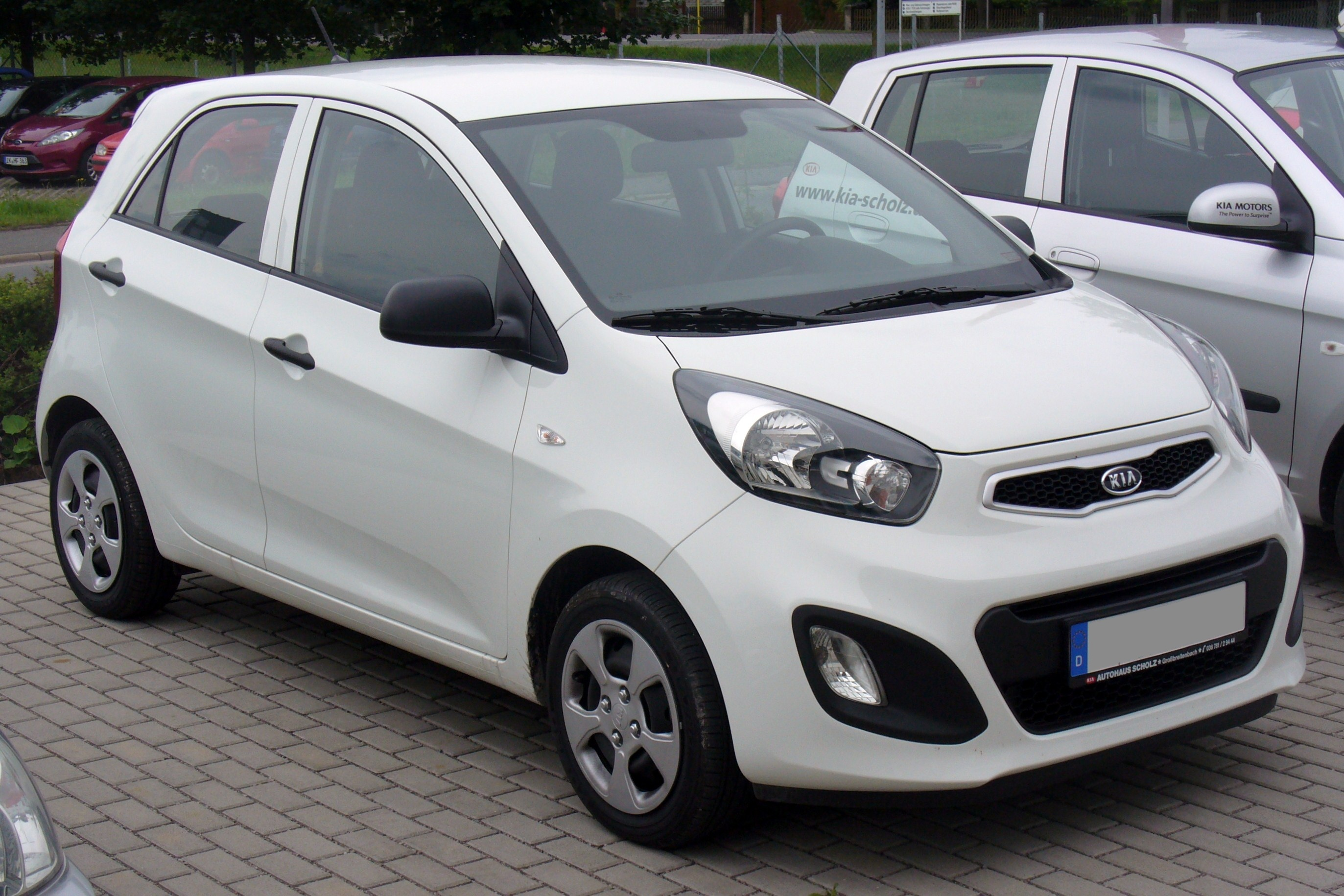
- Picanto 5-door (pre-facelift)

Overview
- Model code: TA
- Also called: Kia Morning
- Production: 2011–2017; August 2019–2026 (Pakistan)
- Assembly: South Korea: Seosan (Donghee); Malaysia: Gurun (Naza); Taiwan: Hsinchu (Sanyang); Vietnam: Chu Lai (THACO Kia); Algeria: Batna (GLOVIZ); Pakistan: Karachi (Lucky Motor Corporation)
- Designer: Peter Schreyer; Park Kee-hong; Cho Kwae-jae

Body and chassis
- Body style: 3/5-door hatchback
- Related: Hyundai i10 (IA); Kia Ray

Powertrain
- Engine: 1.0 L Kappa II MPI I3 (petrol); 1.0 L Kappa II FFV I3 (petrol/ethanol) (Brazil); 1.0 L Kappa II MPI I3 (TCi petrol); 1.25 L Kappa II MPI I4 (petrol); 1.0 L Kappa II LPi I3 (petrol/LPG)
- Transmission: 5-speed manual; 4-speed automatic; CVT

Dimensions
- Wheelbase: 2,385 mm (93.9 in)
- Length: 3,595 mm (141.5 in)
- Width: 1,595 mm (62.8 in)
- Height: 1,490 mm (58.7 in)
- Curb weight: 840–900 kg (1,852–1,984 lb)

The second generation Picanto made its debut at the 2011 Geneva Motor Show. Designed by Kia's European design team based in Frankfurt, Germany, under the direction of Peter Schreyer, the new model is longer in wheelbase and overall length than its predecessor. The Picanto is offered with a choice of two gasoline engines: a 1.0 liter three-cylinder or a 1.25 liter four-cylinder. The Europe-spec 1.25 liter engine features ecoDynamics, Kia's start-stop system. In addition, there is also a petrol/LPG version of the 1.0 liter engine available. The Brazil version is equipped with a flex fuel version of the 1.0 liter engine that uses both petrol and ethanol.

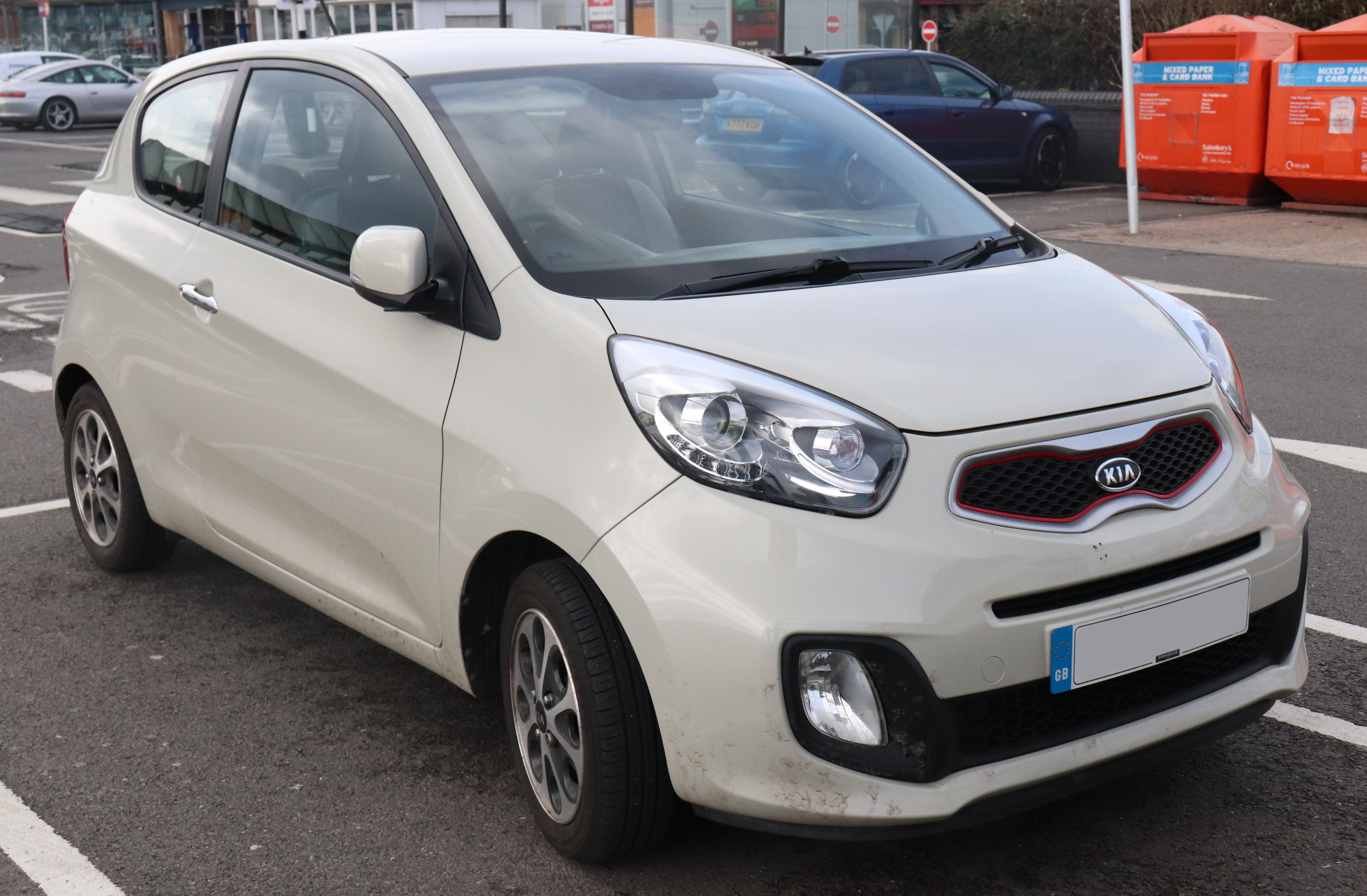
3-door (pre-facelift)

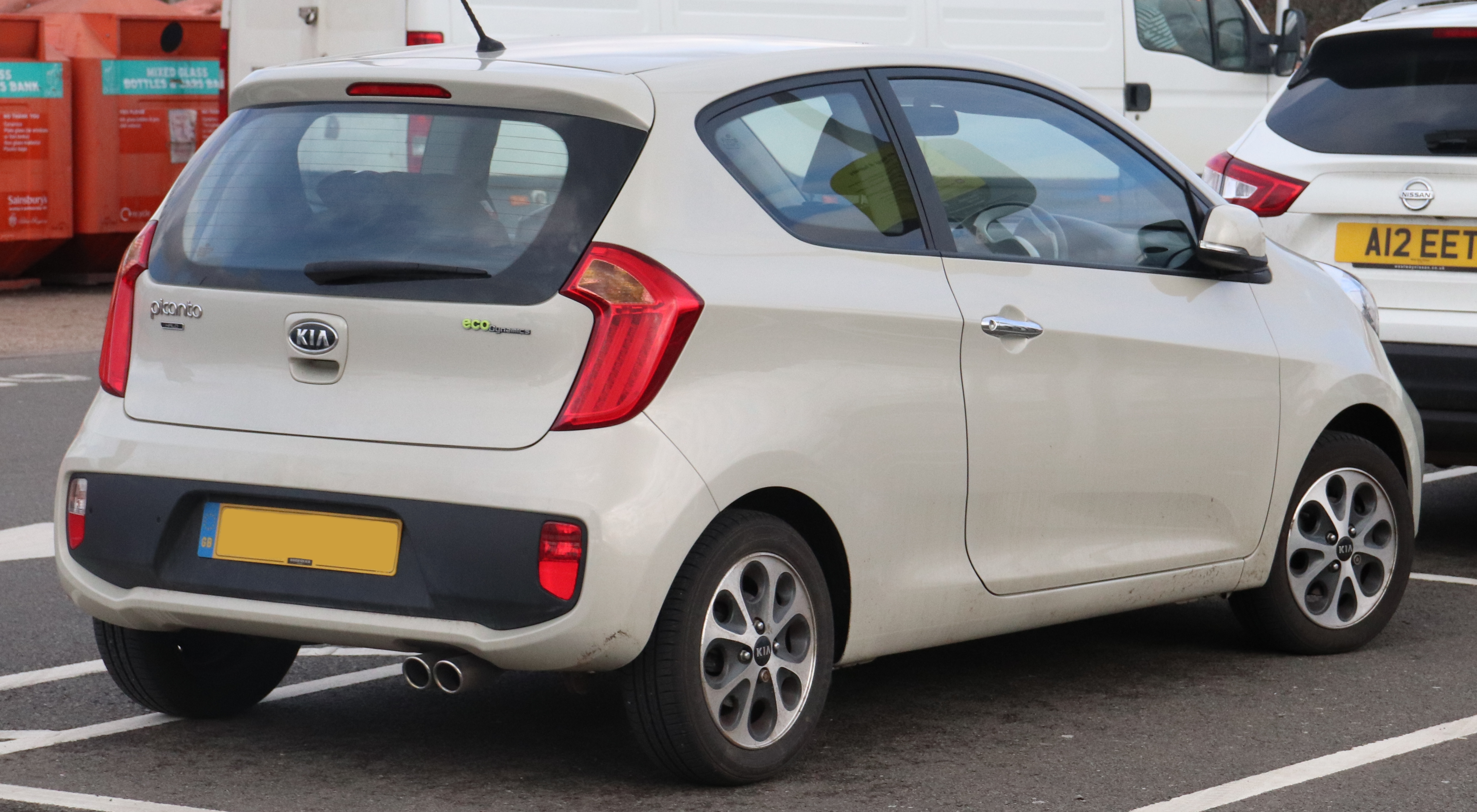
3-door (pre-facelift)

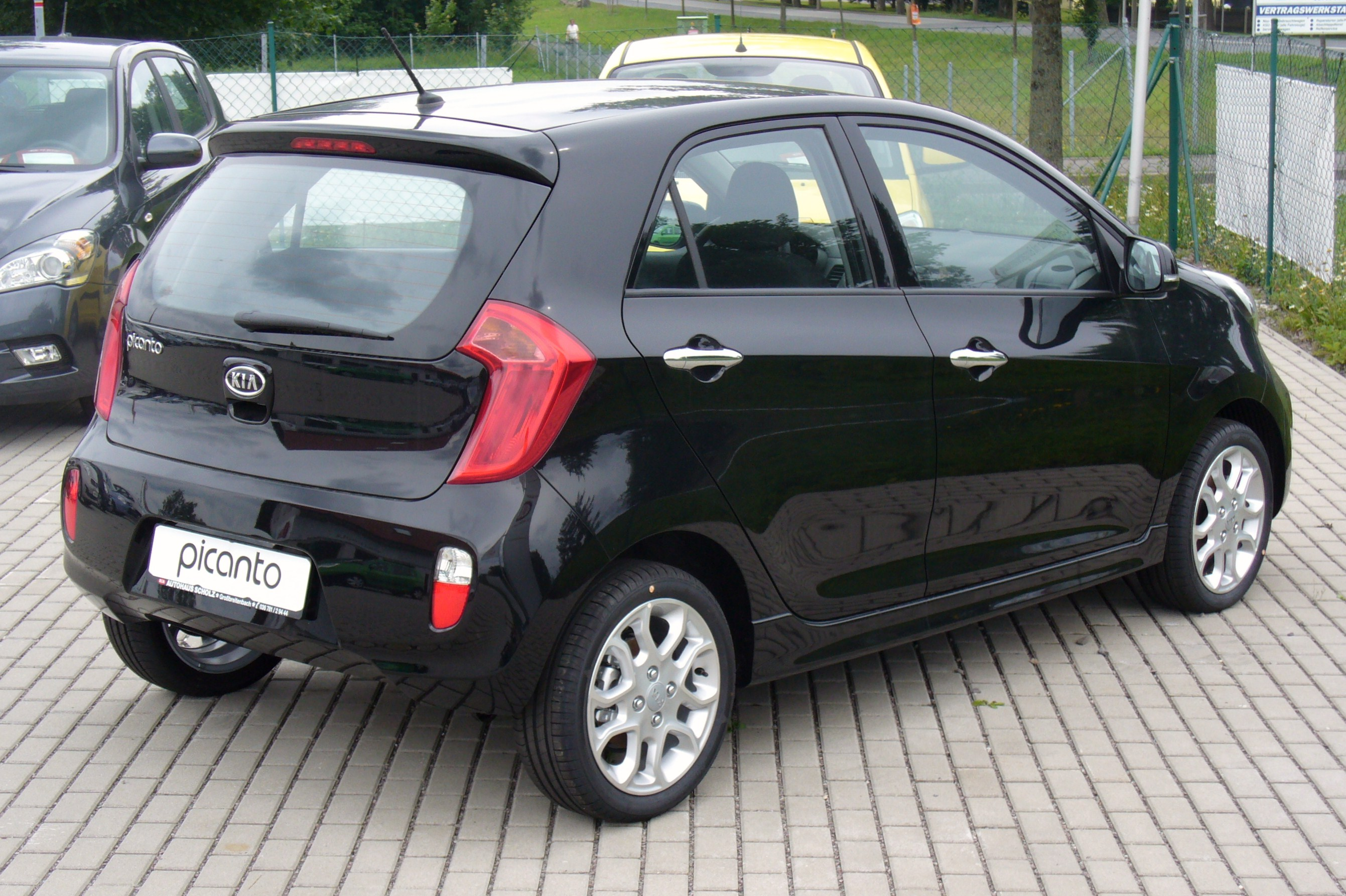
5-door (pre-facelift)

The Picanto was available worldwide (except North America, Venezuela, China, and Singapore) as a 5-door hatchback while the European market received the exclusive 3-door variant. The 3-door version is the same length as the 5-door model, but it sports new windows and doors, different bumpers and a front grille with silver or red trim. In South Korea, the Morning is offered in a Sport Pack, which consists of the 3-door's front and rear bumpers, as well as a digital speedometer.

In some countries, the Picanto name is accompanied by a modifier for marketing reasons. Examples include Picanto Ion for Colombia, Picanto R for Ecuador, Picanto Flex for Brazil, Picanto K1 for Thailand, and Picanto 1250 for New Zealand. In the Indonesian market, the 1.0 liter variant was named Morning 1.0 to distinguish it from the 1.2 liter Picanto; this variant was sold in 2015 only.

The second-generation facelifted Picanto for the Pakistani market was launched at Pakistan Auto Parts Show (PAPS) 2019. It is locally assembled at Lucky Motor Corporation's plant in Karachi. It is offered in two variants: one of the variants comes with 5-speed manual transmission while the other comes with 4-speed CVT. Both variants are equipped with the 1.0 liter Kappa II MPI I3 petrol engine. Production commenced in August 2019, with actual sales starting October 2019.

=== Picanto R-Cross ===
In November 2013, Kia Netherlands released a limited-edition model called the Picanto R-Cross. Marketed to compete with the Volkswagen CrossUp, this model featured a black body kit that wrapped around the wheel wells and was fitted with 14" alloy wheels. Only 500 units of the R-Cross were produced.

=== Marketing ===
As part of the marketing campaign for the Picanto, Kia produced a promotional video featuring the world's first nail art animation. Over 900 artificial nails and 1,200 bottles of nail polish were used in a span of 25 days (with each nail taking two hours to paint) to create images of the Picanto in motion.

In the UK, the Picanto is the official sponsor of the ITV dating game show Take Me Out. Kia UK released a series of viral videos on their YouTube channel to promote both the car and the programme. Each video features actress Natasha Barrero, as she drives a black Picanto 3-door before being swooned over by different men.

A Lemon Grass Morning appears as the transforming robot Tobot D in the South Korean animated series Tobot.

=== Awards ===
The Picanto won the iF product design award in the "Transportation Design" category in 2011 and the Red Dot award in the "Automobiles, transportation, commercial and water vehicles" category in 2012. Top Gear magazine named the Picanto "Bargain Car of the Year" in 2011. The Association of Scottish Motoring Writers awarded the Picanto as "Best Small Car" in 2011. In South Africa, the Picanto took the Standard Bank People's Wheels Award for "Budget Buys - Affordability First" three years straight from 2011 to 2013. In 2016, J.D. Power and Associates awarded the Picanto on UK Vehicle Dependability Study (VDS) in the City Car category.

=== Facelift ===
2013

In 2013, the Morning in South Korea was updated to use the European three-door's front and rear bumpers with the headlights incorporating a new LED daytime running light system. The interior featured a revised instrument cluster with a digital speedometer. The silver trim was replaced with a gloss black trim. A touchscreen multimedia stereo system was offered as an option. The new model was equipped with seven airbags, a Cornering Brake Control system, a handbrake alarm, and height adjustable seat belts. Aside from the standard 1.0 liter gasoline engine, the Picanto was offered with a new "Eco-Plus" engine mated to a continuously variable transmission (CVT).

The international version of the Picanto remained unchanged aside from the new front bumper.

2015

In 2015, the Picanto received redesigned front and rear bumpers with new fog lamps. In addition, the car was offered with a turbocharged version of its 1.0 liter Kappa II engine, which increased power output from 69 hp to 106 hp. The revised engine met Euro 6 standards. The Picanto was also offered with optional 252 mm (9.9 in) front disc brakes, an increase from the stock 241 mm (9.5 in).

The facelifted Picanto debuted at the 2015 Geneva Motor Show in March and went on sale across Europe by the end of the month.

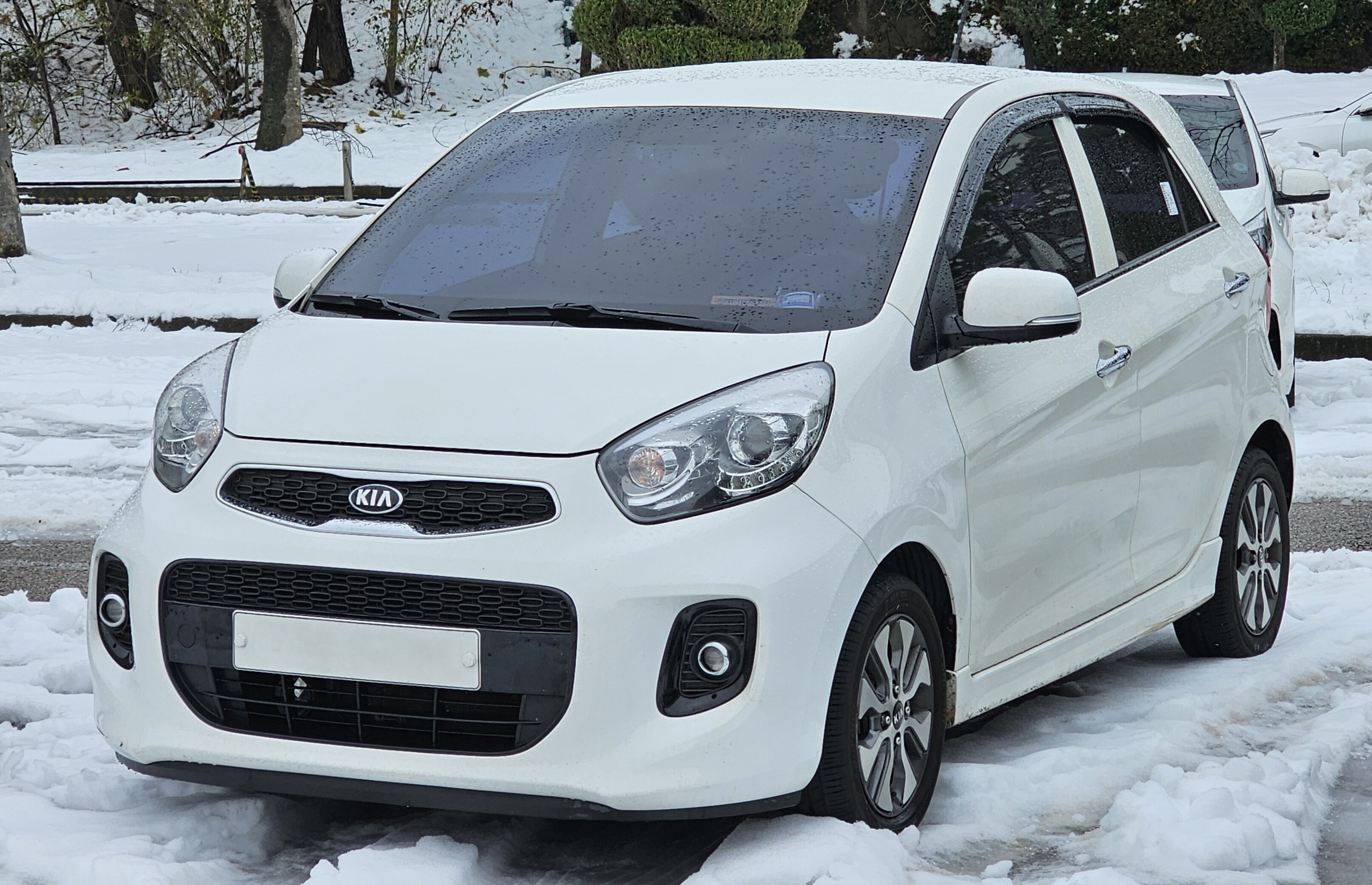
Facelift

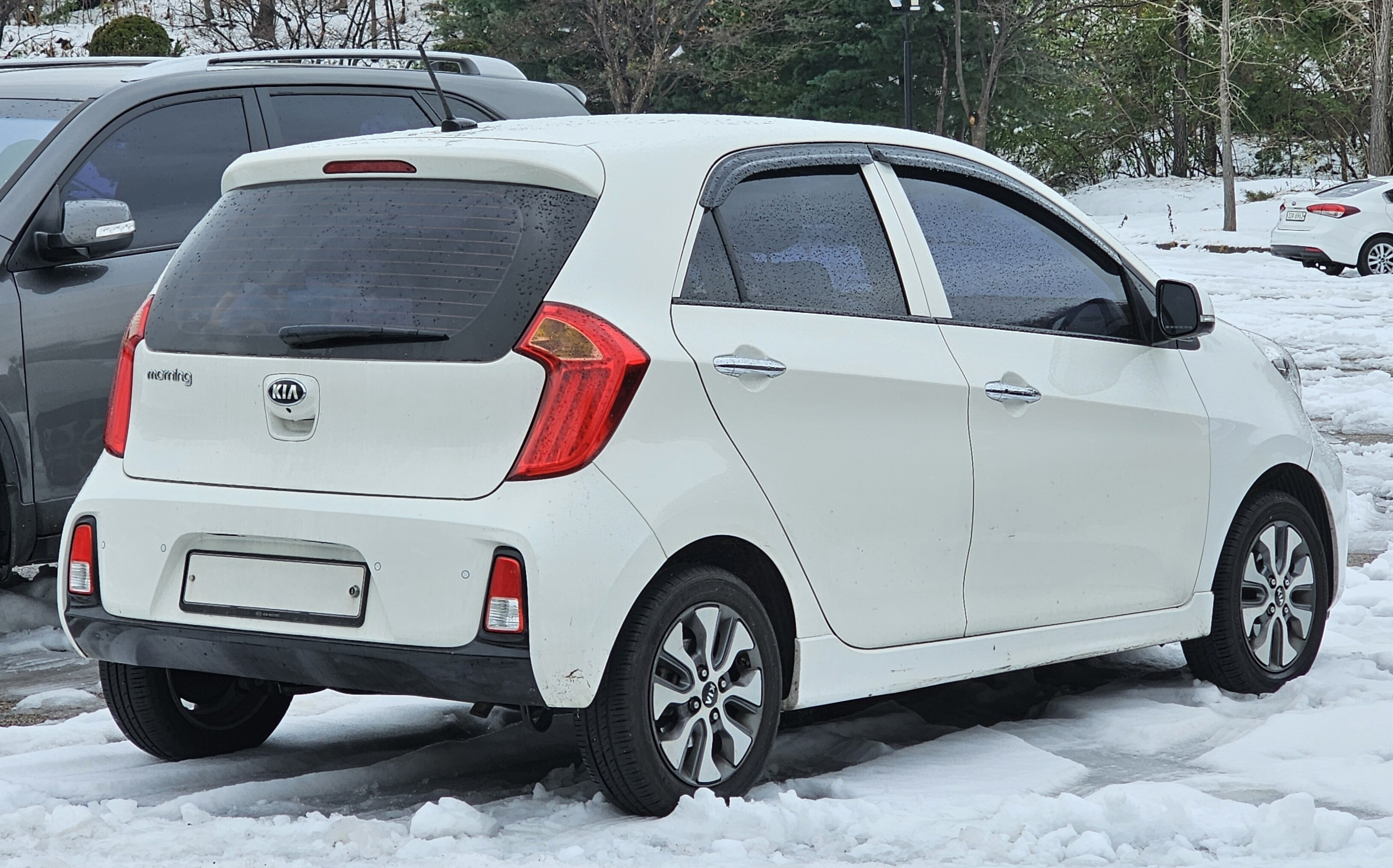
Facelift

=== Safety ===
==== Global NCAP ====
The African version of the Picanto with driver airbag and no ABS received 3 stars for adult occupants and 2 stars for infants from Global NCAP 1.0 in 2018 (similar to Latin NCAP 2013).

Global NCAP 1.0 test results (South Africa) 2018 Kia Picanto (2018, similar to Latin NCAP 2013)
Test	Score	Stars
Adult occupant protection	10.78/17.00	3 /5 stars
Child occupant protection	17.0/49.00	2 /5 stars

==== Latin NCAP ====
The Picanto in its most basic Latin American market configuration with no airbags, no ABS and no ESC received 0 stars for adult occupants and 1 star for toddlers from Latin NCAP 2.0 in 2016.

Latin NCAP 2.0 test results 2016 Kia Picanto (2016, based on Euro NCAP 2008)
Test	Points	Stars
Adult occupant:	0.0/34.0	0 /5 stars
Child occupant:	13.30/49.00	1 /5 stars

==== ASEAN NCAP ====
ASEAN NCAP test results for a RHD, 5-door hatchback variant on a 2013 registration (with and without airbags):

ASEAN NCAP test results Kia Picanto (non-airbag) (2013)
Test	Points	Stars
Adult occupant:	0.40	0 /5 stars
Child occupant:	29%	1 /5 stars
Safety assist:	NA	

ASEAN NCAP test results Kia Picanto (2013)
Test	Points	Stars
Adult occupant:	12.67	4 /5 stars
Child occupant:	73%	4 /5 stars
Safety assist:	NA	

ASEAN NCAP test results Kia Morning (2015)
Test	Points	Stars
Adult occupant:	1.48	0 /5 stars
Child occupant:	27%	1 /5 stars
Safety assist:	NA	

The airbag variant tested was the Malaysian model equipped with six airbags, Electronic stability control (ESC), and Isofix. The non-airbag variant tested was the Thai version, which is similarly equipped as the Philippine and Indonesian models.

==== Euro NCAP ====
Euro NCAP test results for a LHD, 5-door hatchback variant on a 2011 registration:

Euro NCAP test results Kia Picanto (2011)
Test	Points	%
Overall:	4 /5 stars	
Adult occupant:	31	86%
Child occupant:	40	83%
Pedestrian:	17	47%
Safety assist:	3	43%

==== ANCAP ====
Australian NCAP test results for a RHD, 5-door hatchback variant on a 2016 registration:

ANCAP test results Kia Picanto all New Zealand variants (2011)
Test	Score
Overall	5 /5 stars
Frontal offset	15.12/16
Side impact	14.14/16
Pole	2/2
Seat belt reminders	3/3
Whiplash protection	Not Assessed
Pedestrian protection	Marginal
Electronic stability control	Standard

ANCAP test results Kia Picanto all Australian & New Zealand variants (2013)
Test	Score
Overall	5 /5 stars
Frontal offset	15.12/16
Side impact	14.14/16
Pole	2/2
Seat belt reminders	3/3
Whiplash protection	Adequate
Pedestrian protection	Marginal
Electronic stability control	Standard

== Third generation (JA; 2017) ==
Third generation
- Pre-facelift

Overview
- Model code: JA
- Also called: Kia Morning; Kia Grand Eko Taxi (Colombia)
- Production: March 2017–present
- Assembly: South Korea: Seosan (Donghee); Malaysia: Gurun (Naza); Algeria: Batna (GLOVIZ) (2017-2019); Russia: Kaliningrad (Avtotor); Vietnam: Chu Lai (Thaco Kia) (facelift, 2020-present)
- Designer: Peter Schreyer

Body and chassis
- Body style: 5-door hatchback
- Platform: Hyundai-Kia BA
- Related: Hyundai Casper; Hyundai i10 (AC3); Kia Syros

Powertrain
- Engine: Petrol: 1.0 L Kappa II MPI I3; 1.0 L Kappa II TCI MPI I3; 1.0 L Kappa II T-GDI I3; 1.0 L Smartstream G1.0 MPI I3; 1.0 L Smartstream G1.0 T-GDI I3; 1.2 L Smartstream G1.2 MPI I4; 1.25 L Kappa II MPI I4; LPG: 1.0 L Kappa LPI I3
- Transmission: 5-speed manual 4-speed automatic 5-speed automated manual

Dimensions
- Wheelbase: 2,400 mm (94.5 in)
- Length: 3,595 mm (141.5 in)
- Width: 1,595 mm (62.8 in)
- Height: 1,485 mm (58.5 in)

The third-generation Picanto made its official global debut at the 2017 Geneva Motor Show. The new Picanto was equipped with a choice of three engines: the outgoing model's 1.0-liter Kappa II three-cylinder engine in the multi-point injected and turbocharged direct-injected versions, and the 1.2-liter Kappa II four-cylinder engine. Both 1.0-liter engines were mated exclusively with a 5-speed manual transmission, while the 1.2-liter engine was also offered with an optional 4-speed automatic transmission. The car features all-new safety features such as Torque Vectoring Brake Based (TVBB) system, Straight Line Stability (SLS), Forward Collision Warning System (FCWS) and Autonomous Emergency Braking (AEB).

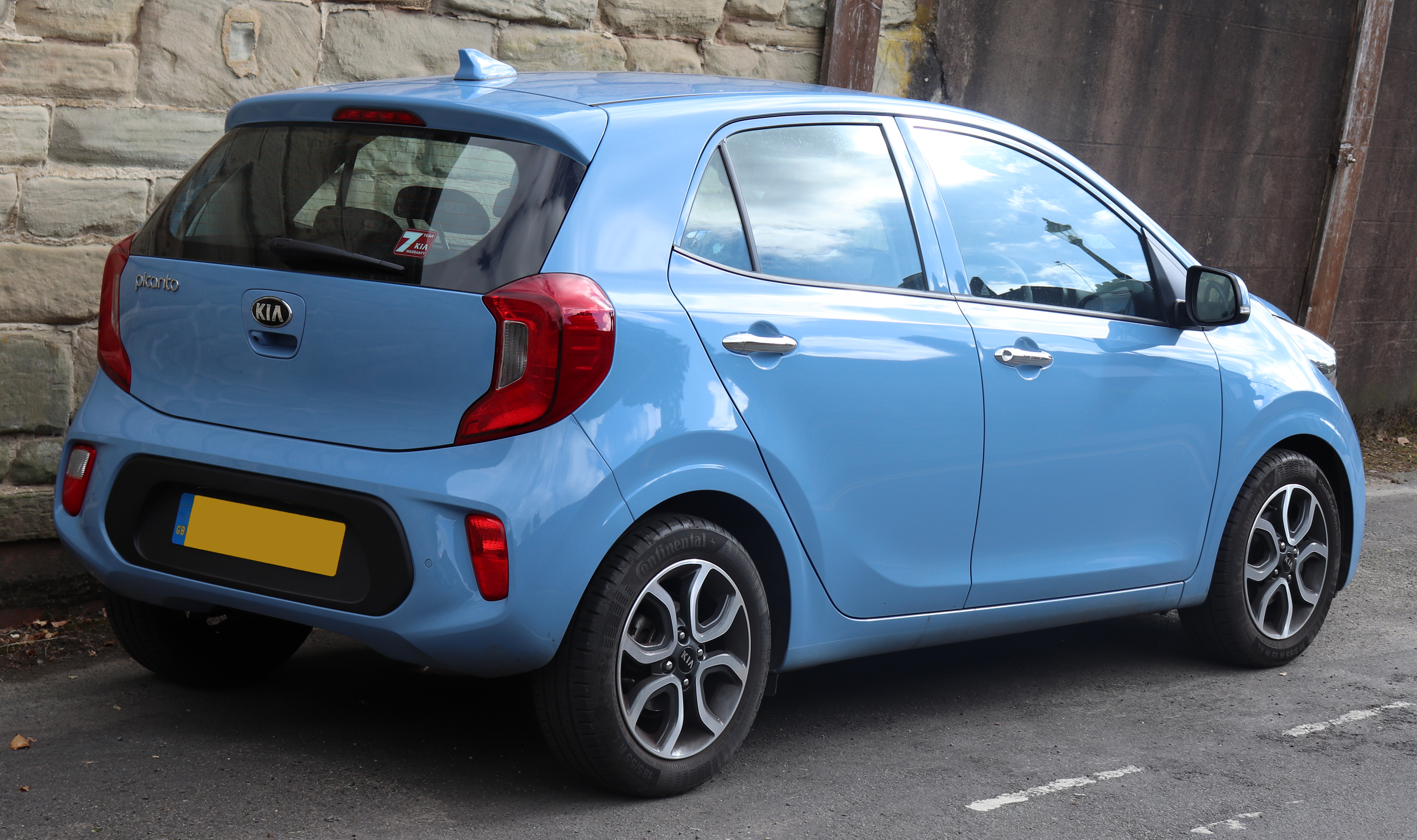
Rear view (pre-facelift) (United Kingdom)

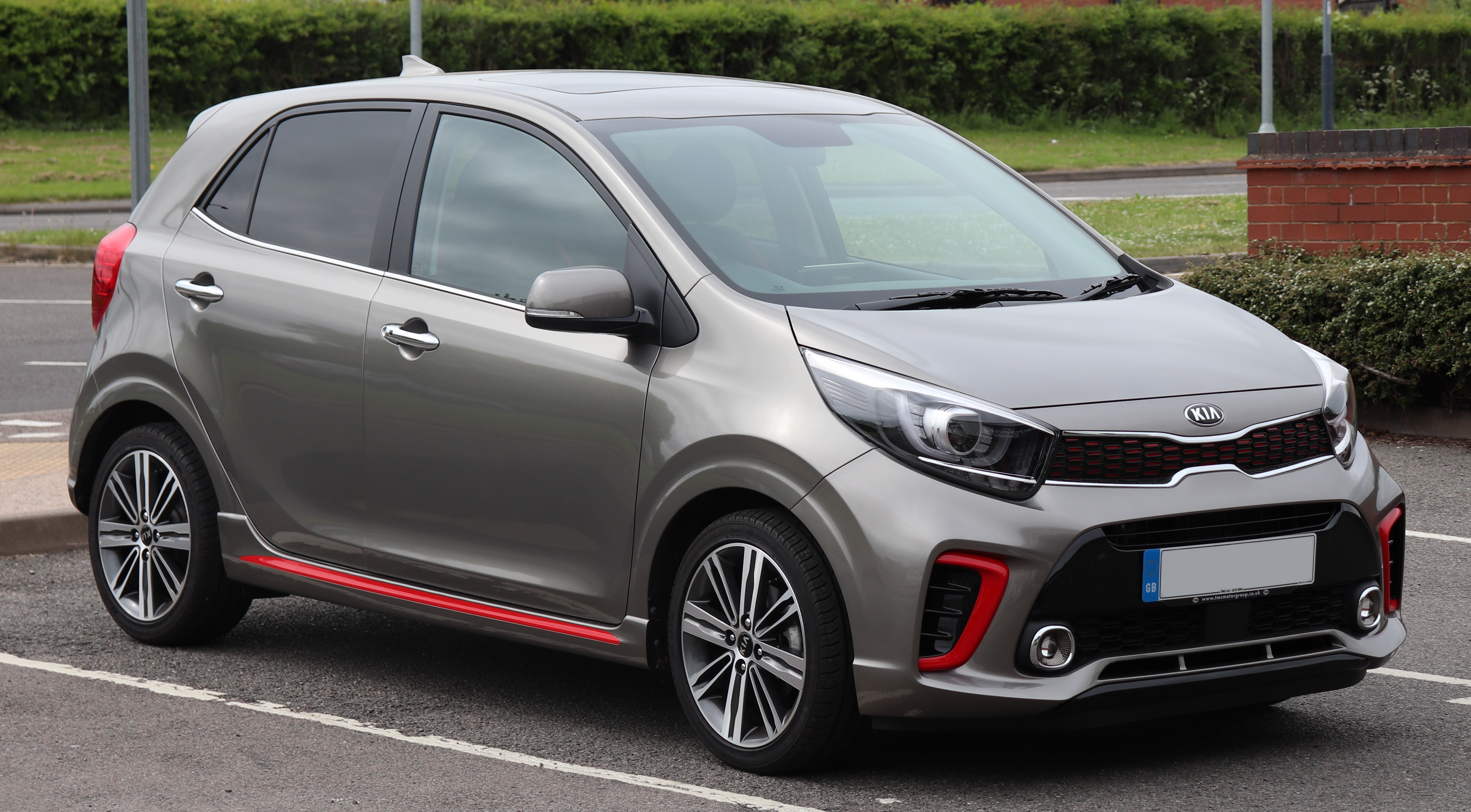
GT-Line

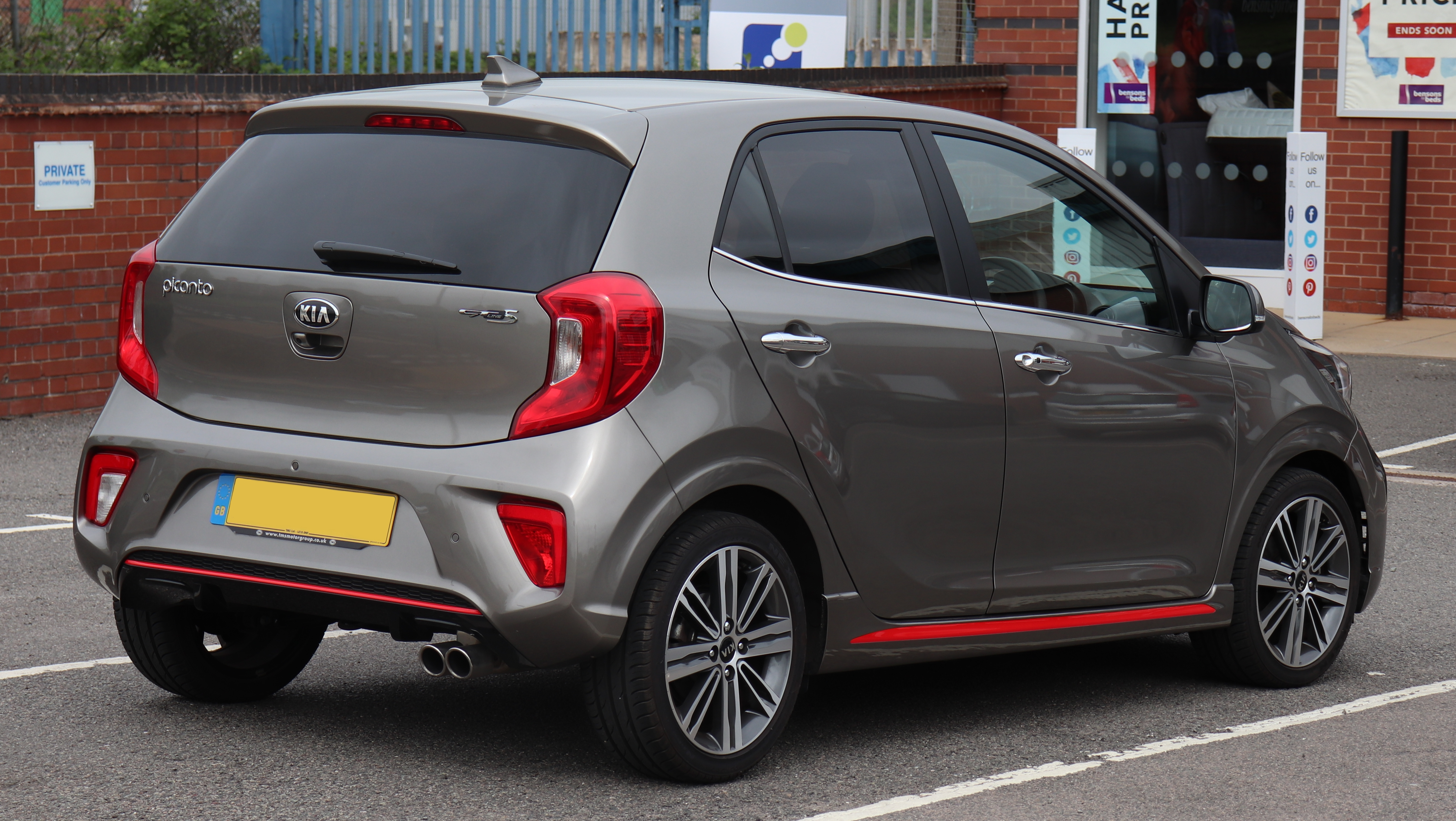
GT-Line

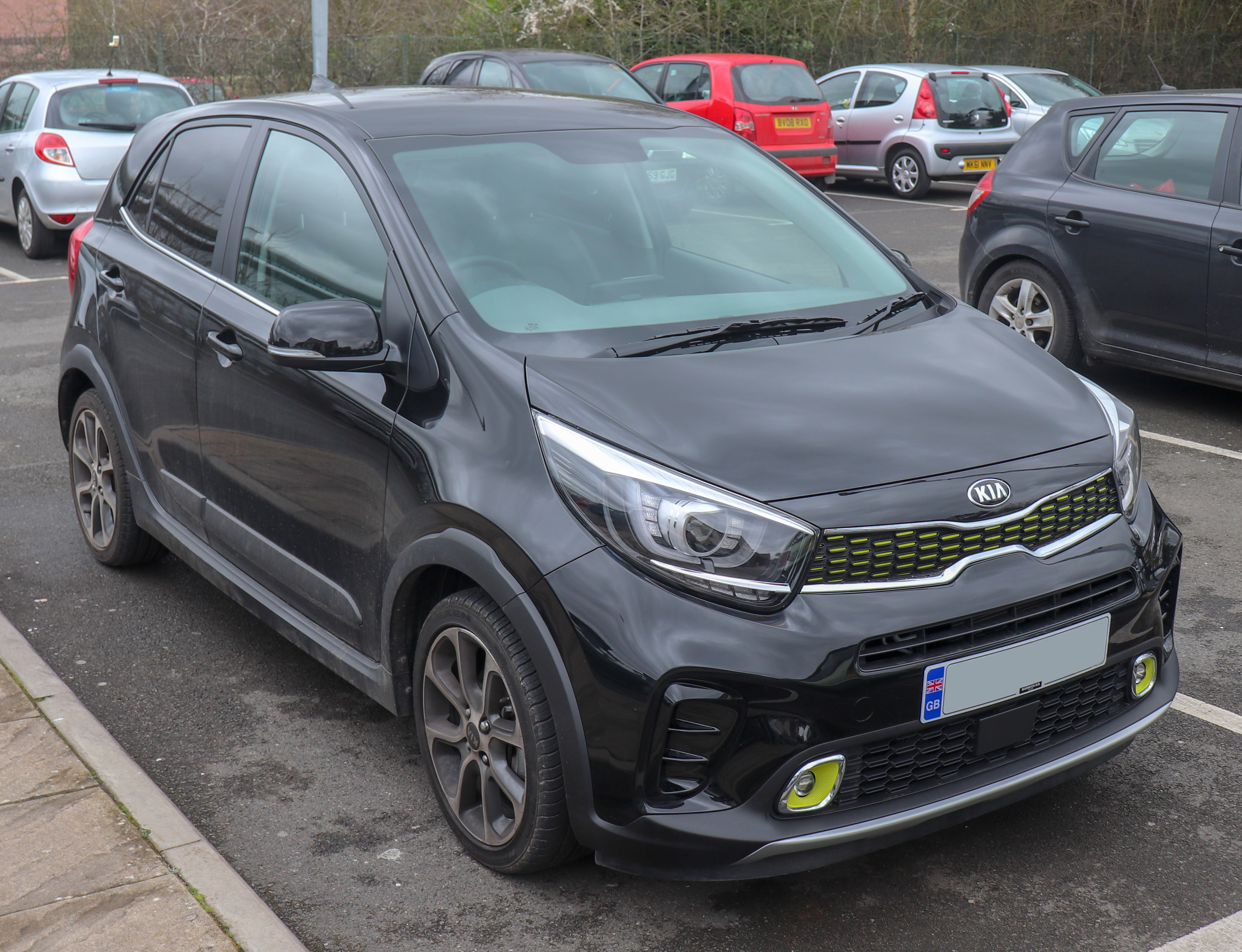
X-Line (UK)

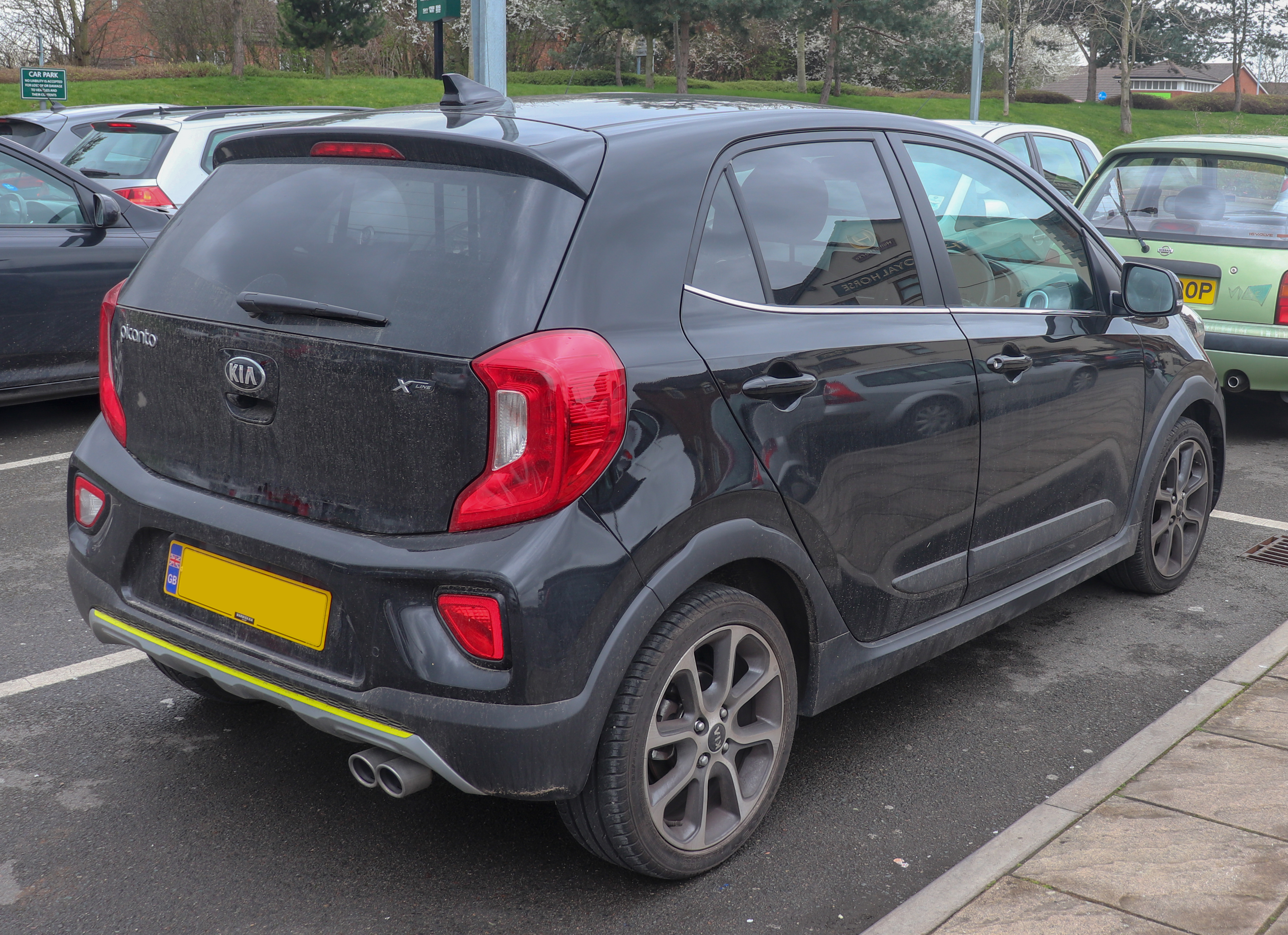
X-Line (UK)

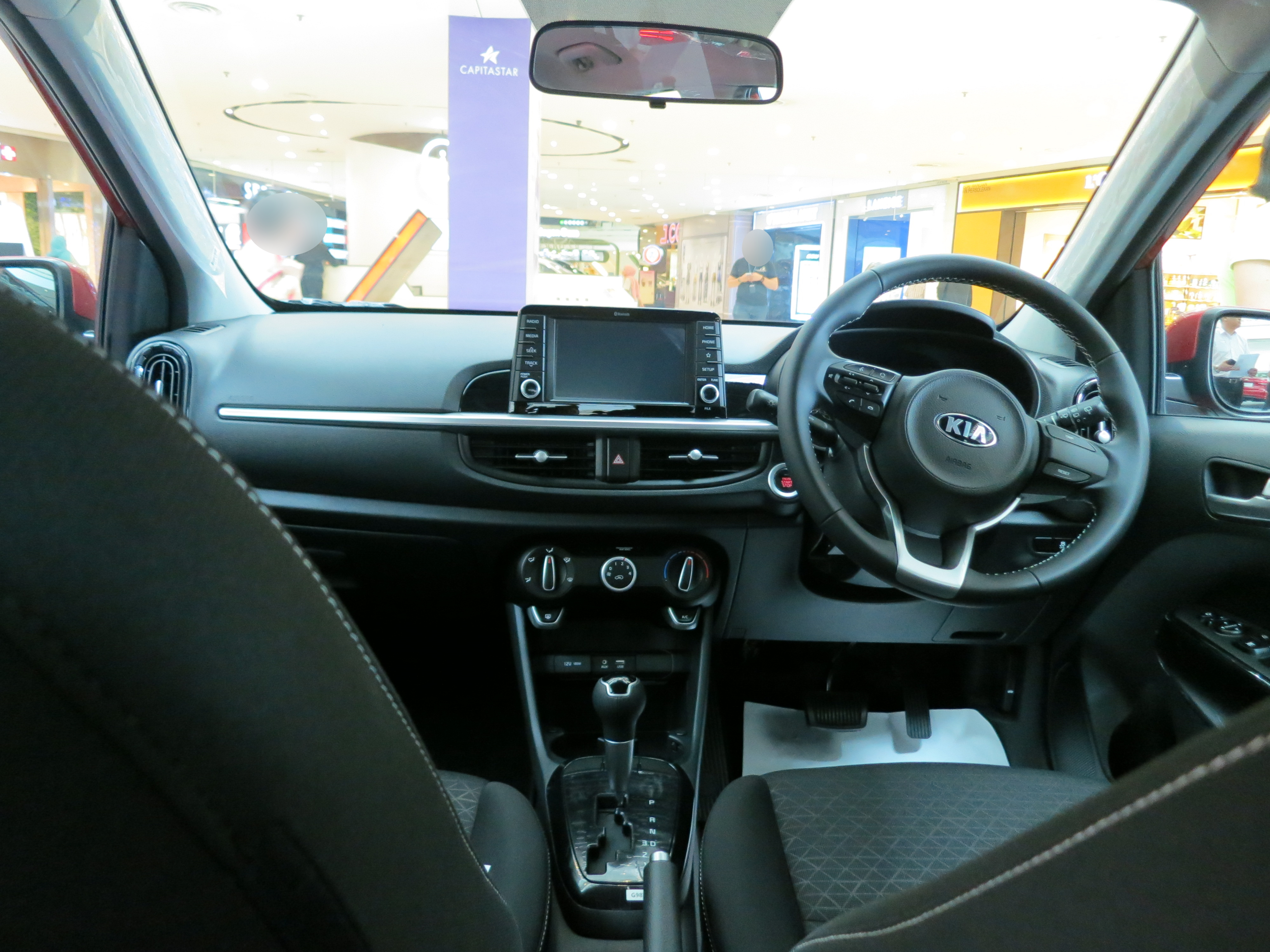
Interior

For the Malaysian market, the third-generation Picanto was launched in January 2018. It was powered by the naturally-aspirated 1.2-litre four-cylinder engine and was initially available in only one trim level (EX), with a 4-speed automatic transmission. In January 2019, the GT-Line variant was announced, featuring Autonomous Emergency Braking (AEB) and many other new features. In May 2019, a base variant KX and a crossover variant designated X-Line were added.

For the Indonesian market, the third-generation Picanto went on sale in October 2019. It was powered by the 1.2-liter four-cylinder engine and offered in GT-Line and EX trim levels with either a 5-speed manual or a 4-speed automatic transmission. The Picanto was discontinued in Indonesia in 2022.

=== Marketing ===
Kia Motors in South Korea debuted the Morning in January 2017 with a series of TV commercials featuring actors Shim Eun-kyung, Park Jeong-min, and Jin Kyung. For the international release of the Picanto and the fourth-generation Kia Rio, Kia Motors produced two music videos featuring Korean-American singer Kate Kim and American musician Lee Radde in May 2017.

The Picanto GT Line was featured in Season 2 Episode 3 of The Grand Tour, where co-presenters James May and Richard Hammond drove it on a "lunchtime office car park racing" track at Houghton Hall business park in the Luton/Dunstable Urban Area.

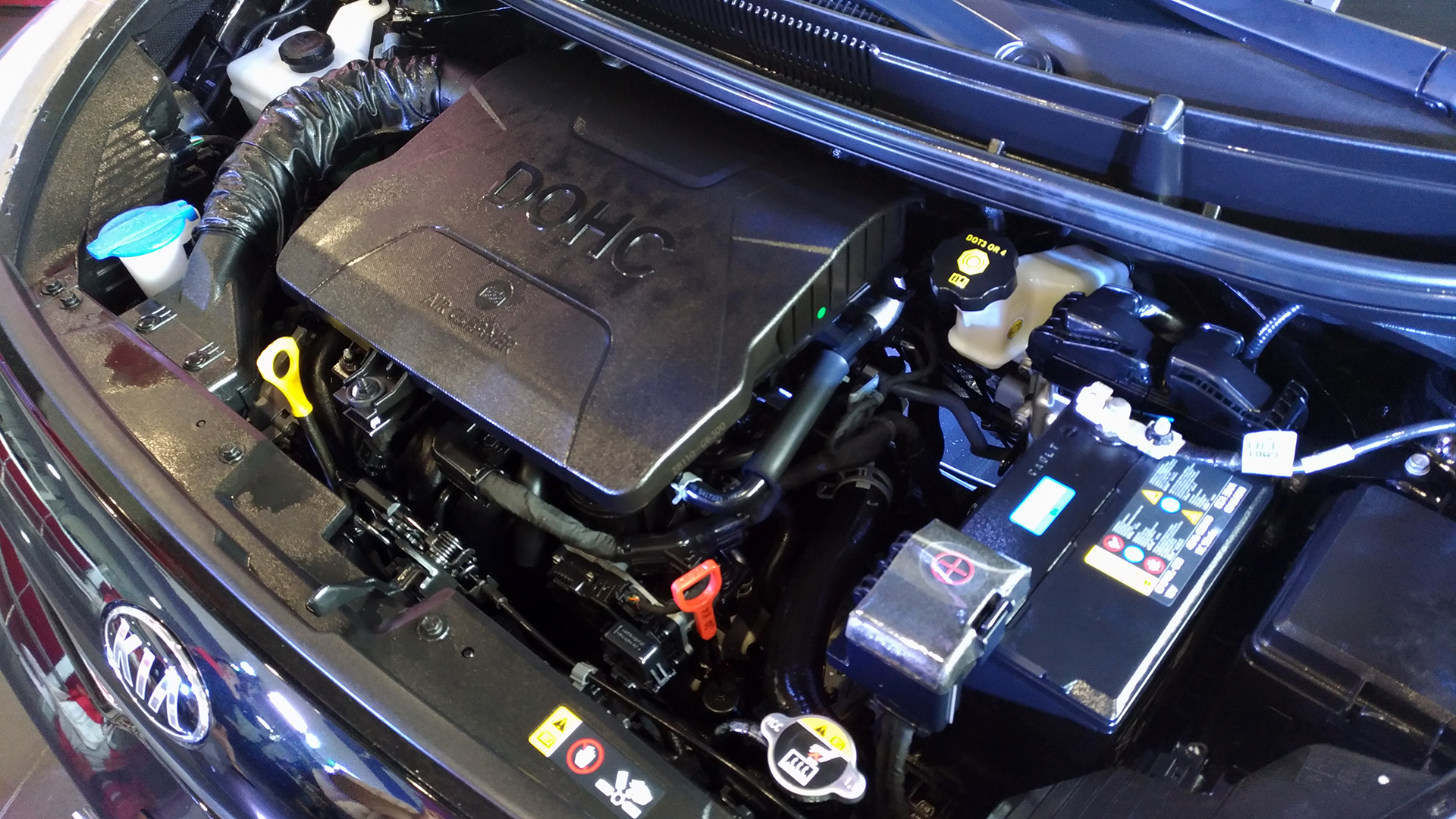
2018 Kia Picanto GT-Line S 1.25 liter Kappa II engine

=== Awards ===
The third-generation Picanto won the iF product design award in the "Transportation Design" category and the Red Dot award in the "Car Design" category in 2018.

What Car? named the Picanto "Best City Car" in their 2018 Car of the Year Awards.

=== Safety ===
==== Latin NCAP ====
Latin NCAP 3.0 results for the South Korean-made Picanto in its most basic Latin American market configuration with two airbags, no load limiters, and no ESC (similar to Euro NCAP 2014) in 2020 for a LHD, 5-door hatchback variant with only one airbag. It received a zero-star rating

Latin NCAP 3.0 test results 2020 Kia Picanto (2020, similar to Euro NCAP 2014)
Test	Points	%
Overall:	0 /5 stars	
Adult occupant:	0.0	0%
Child occupant:	14.32	29%
Pedestrian:	24.59	51%
Safety assist:	3.00	7%

==== Euro NCAP ====
Euro NCAP test results in 2017 for a LHD, 5-door hatchback variant with standard equipment on a 2017 registration:

Euro NCAP test results Kia Picanto w/ standard equipment (2017)
Test	Points	%
Overall:	3 /5 stars	
Adult occupant:	30.3	79%
Child occupant:	31.6	64%
Pedestrian:	22.8	54%
Safety assist:	3	25%

Euro NCAP test results in 2017 for a LHD, 5-door hatchback variant with optional safety pack on a 2017 registration:

Euro NCAP test results Kia Picanto w/ optional safety pack (2017)
Test	Points	%
Overall:	4 /5 stars	
Adult occupant:	30.3	79%
Child occupant:	31.6	64%
Pedestrian:	22.8	54%
Safety assist:	5.7	47%

==== ANCAP ====
ANCAP test results Kia Picanto (2017, aligned with Euro NCAP)
Test	Points	%
Overall:	4 /5 stars	
Adult occupant:	33.2	87%
Child occupant:	31.5	64%
Pedestrian:	22.7	54%
Safety assist:	5.7	47%

=== 2020 facelift ===
In June 2020, Kia introduced a mid-life facelift. Featuring styling tweaks on the exterior, new technology and powertrains. Exterior update on standard models includes restyled headlights and grille, whilst the GT-Line and X-Line trims were given restyled front and rear bumpers. Interior updates includes a 4.2-inch instrument panel and 8-inch infotainment system with Apple CarPlay and Android Auto supports. Other interior updates are new upholstery and different colour trim options.

The engine range has also been updated with revised fuel injection and engine management to improve fuel economy as well as a five-speed automatic gearbox to replace the older four-speed one. Safety and driver assist technology has been updated with features such as lane-keeping aid and emergency stop signal, the latter of which automatically turn on the car’s hazard lights in an event of sudden braking.

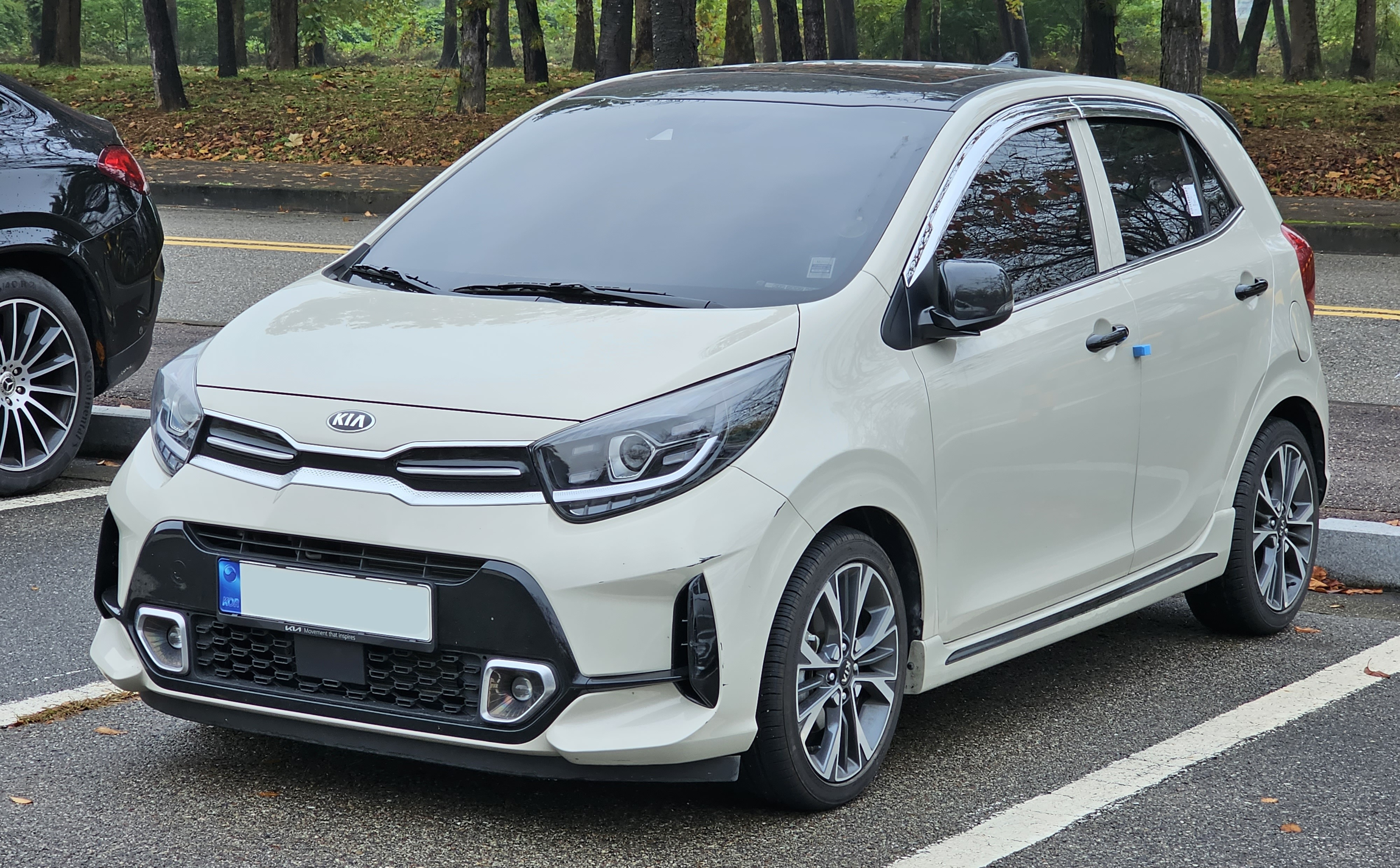
Facelift

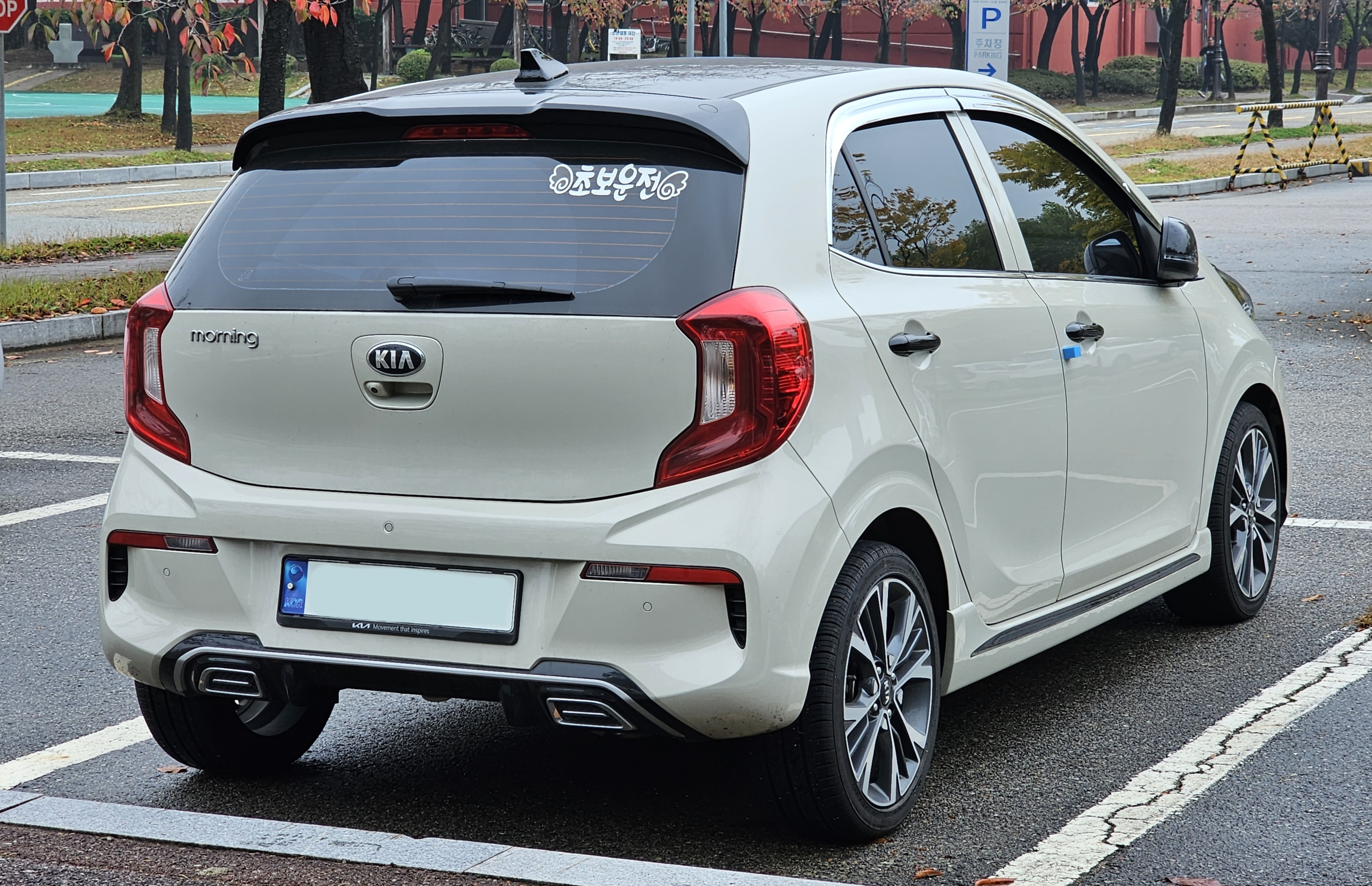
Facelift

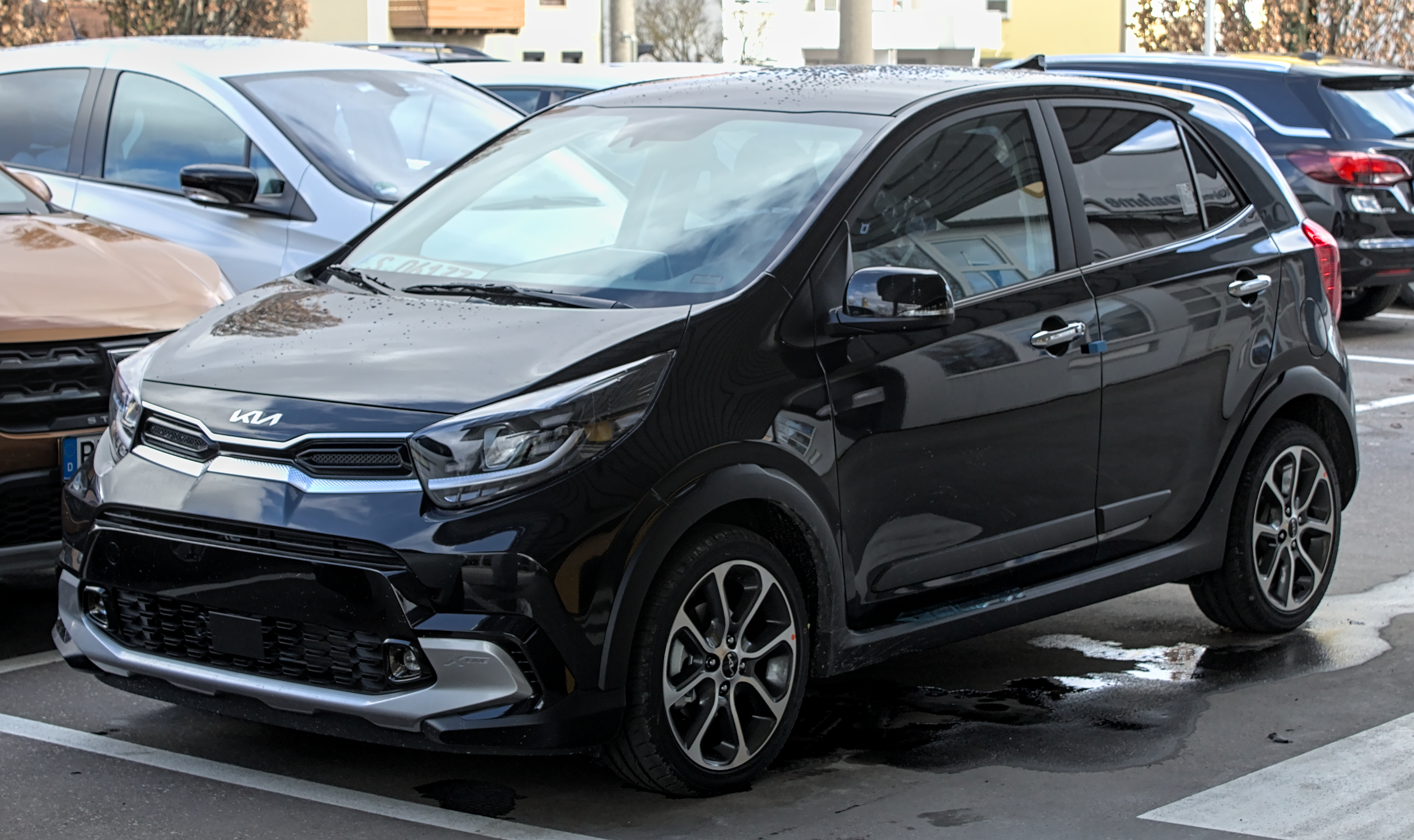
X-Line (facelift)

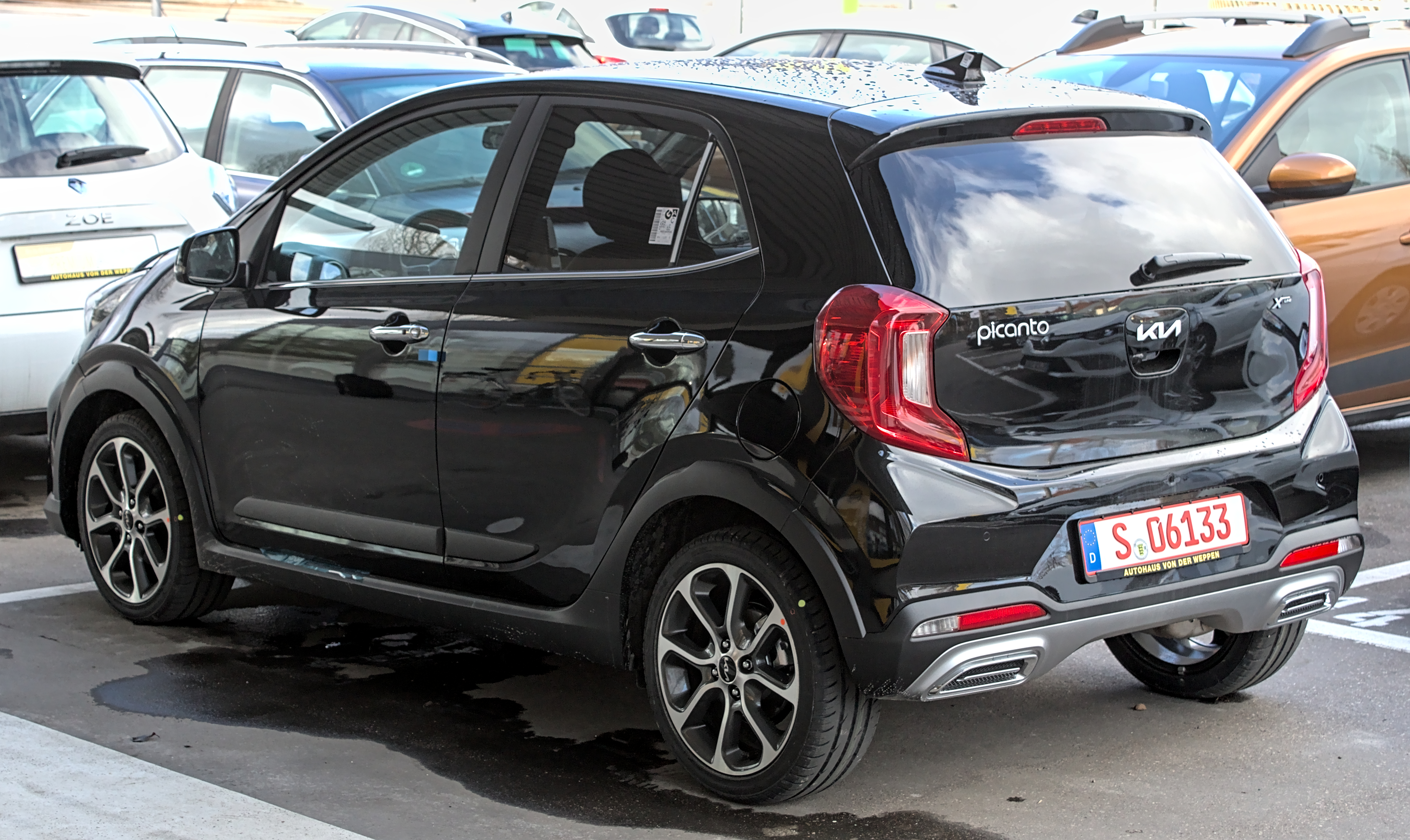
X-Line (facelift)

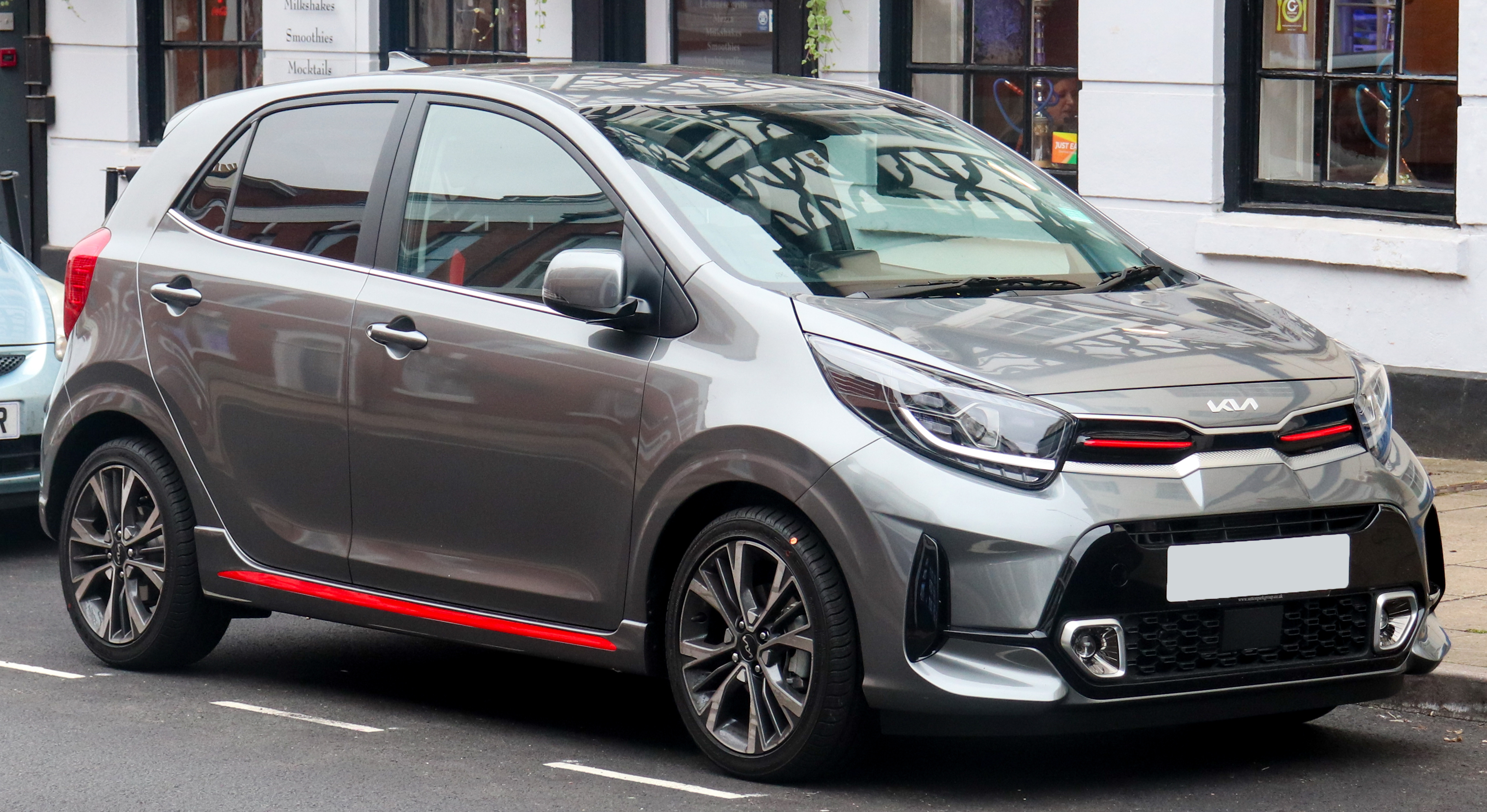
GT-Line (facelift)

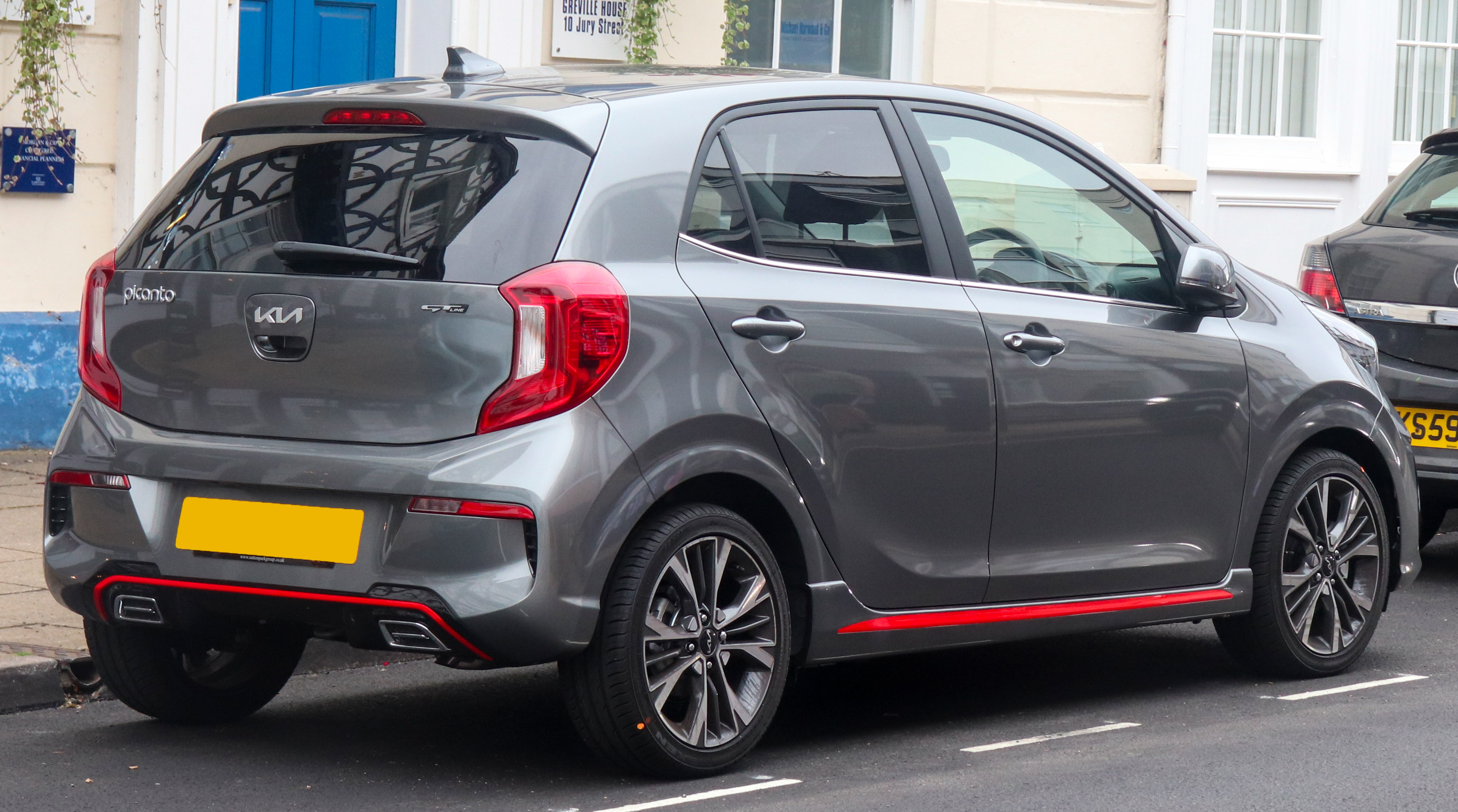
GT-Line (facelift)

=== 2023 facelift ===
On 4 July 2023, a second refresh of the JA Kia Picanto/Morning was unveiled in South Korea. This includes new styling changes, safety improvements and new equipment such as LED headlights and a new instrument cluster.

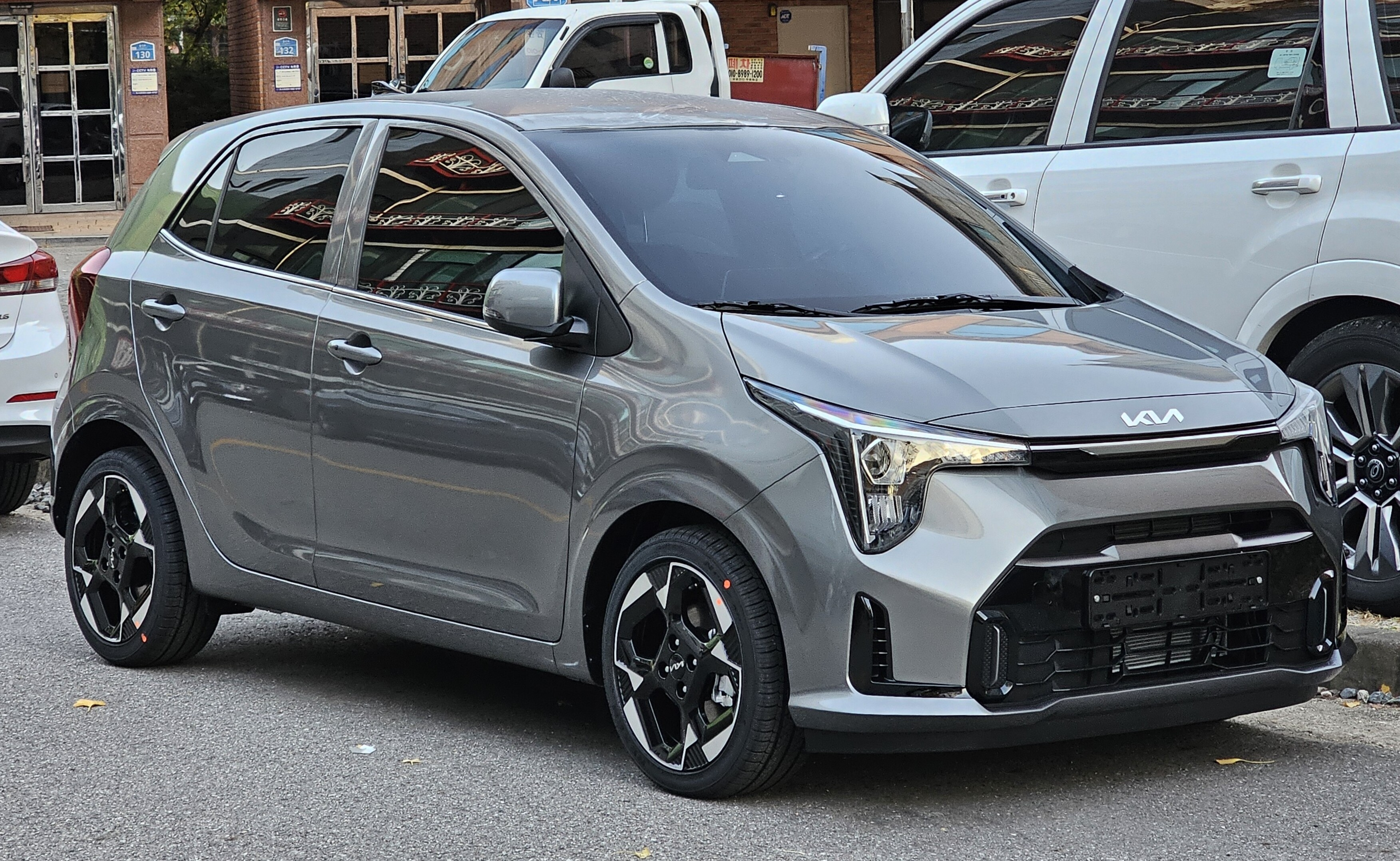
Second facelift (South Korea)

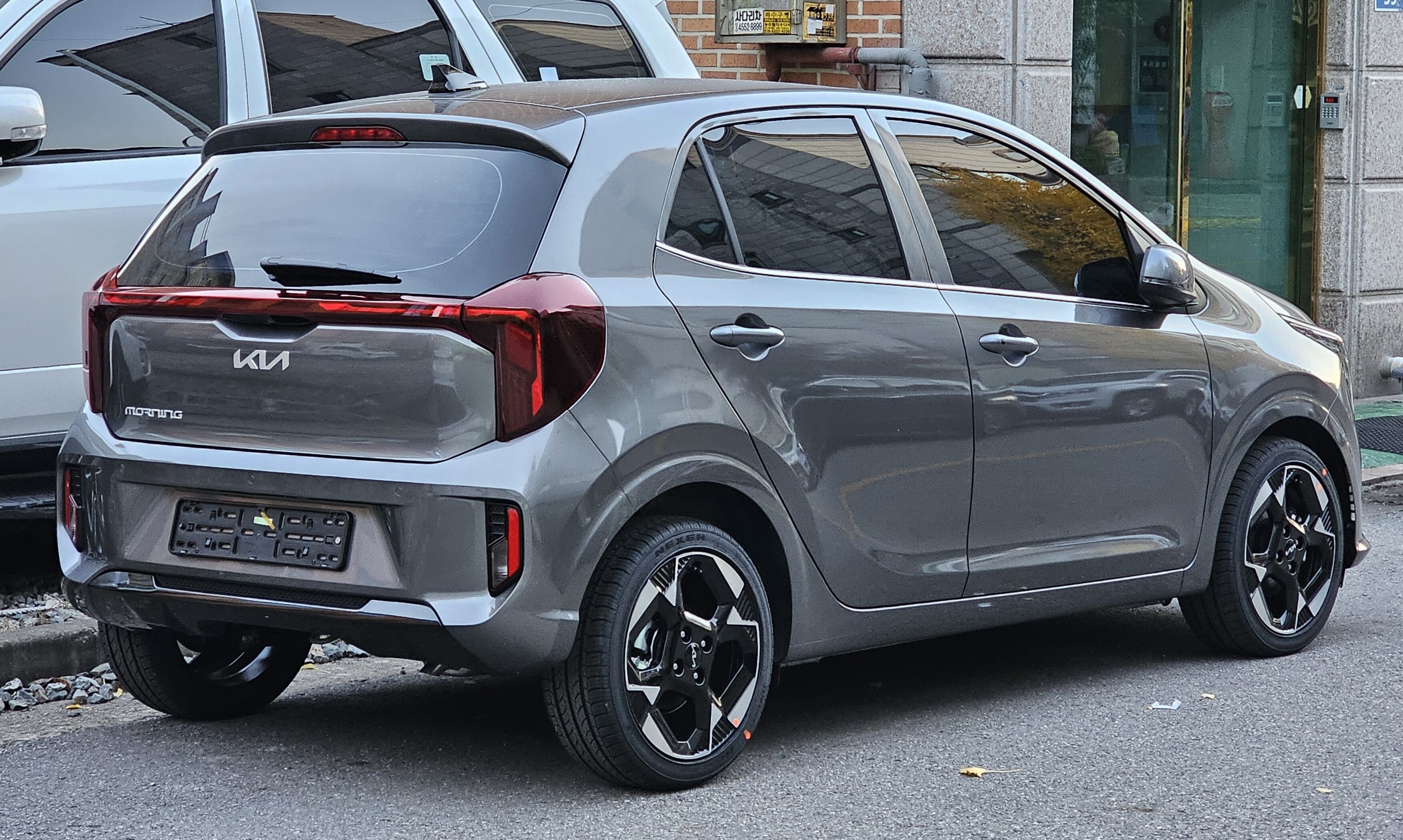
Second facelift (South Korea)

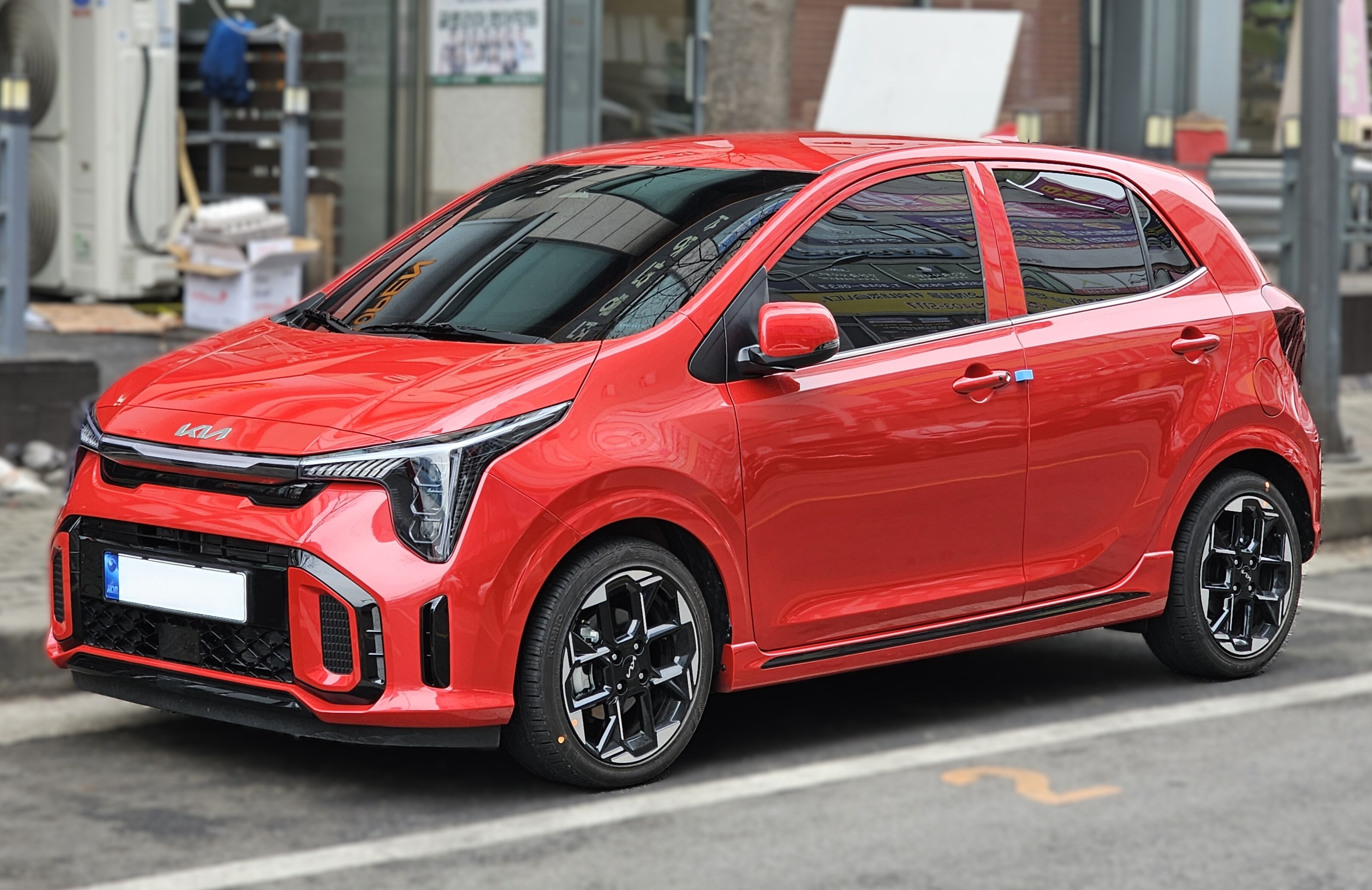
GT-Line (second facelift; South Korea)

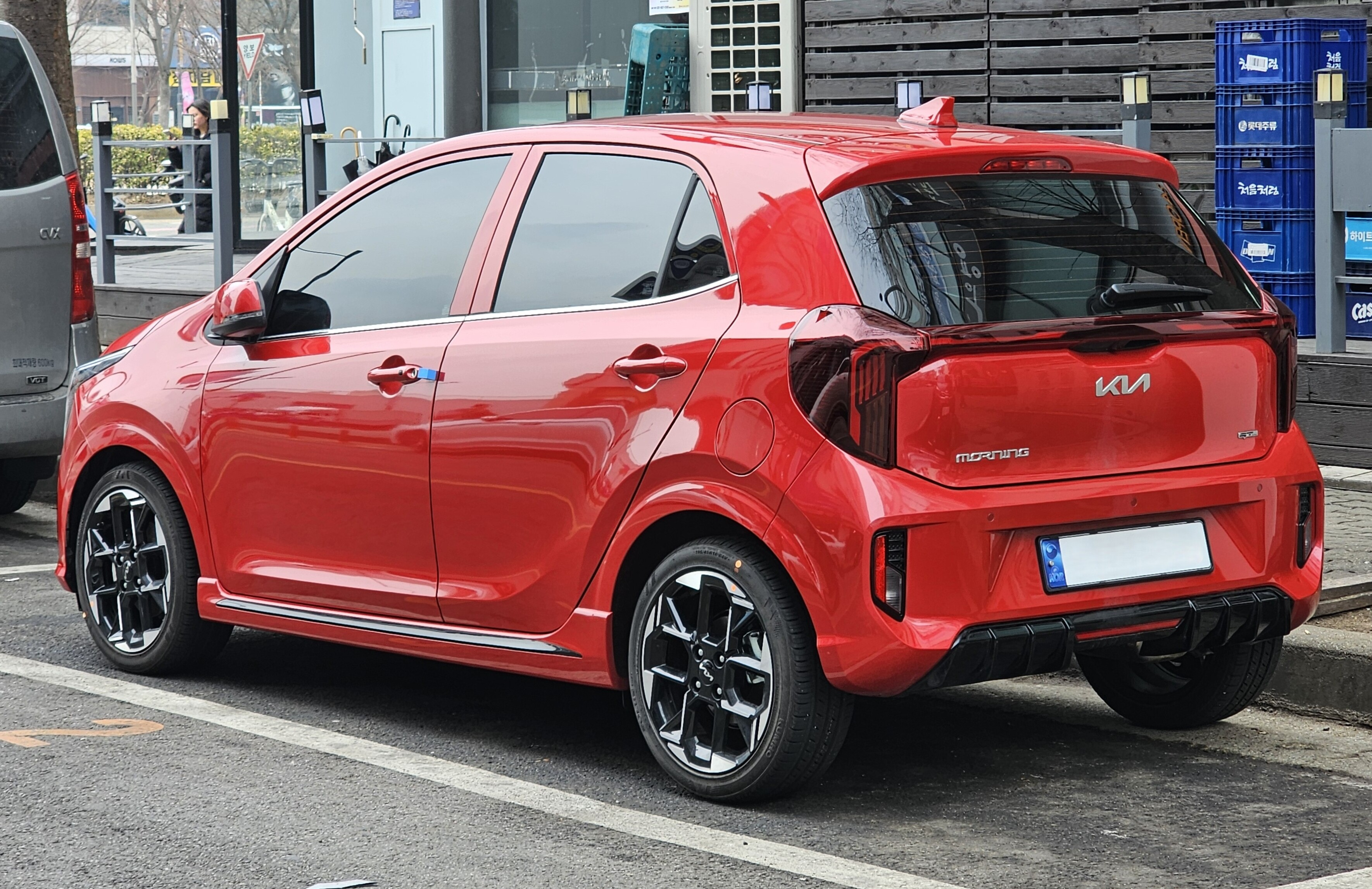
GT-Line (second facelift; South Korea)

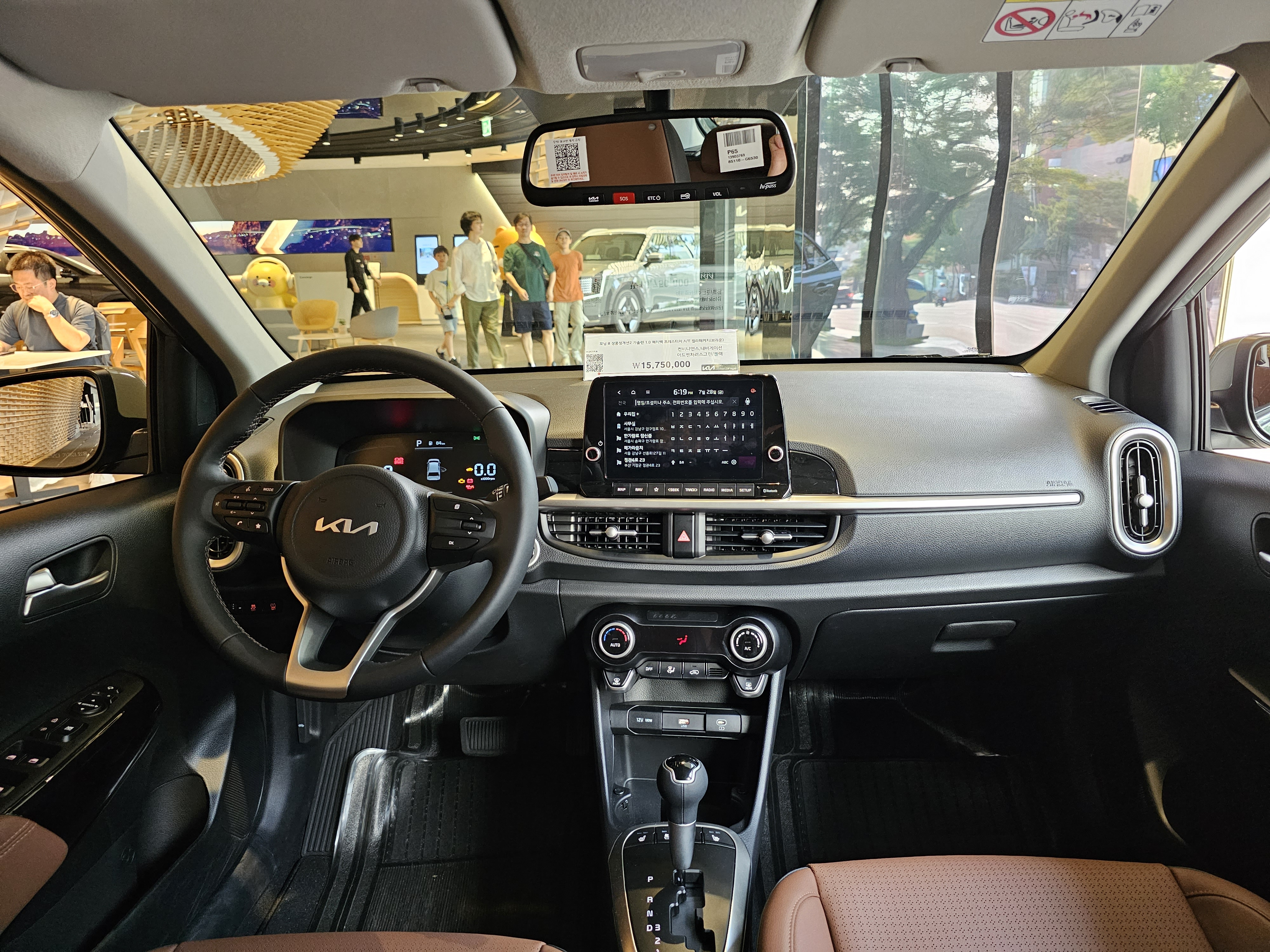
Interior

== Reliability ==
In January 2013, the Picanto was named most reliable car in the UK, according to data published by Moneysupermarket.com in conjunction with Warranty Direct. Out of a Reliability Index (RI) of 100 (the lower the score, the fewer problems reported by owners), the Picanto achieved a score of 3.00/100.

== Motorsport ==
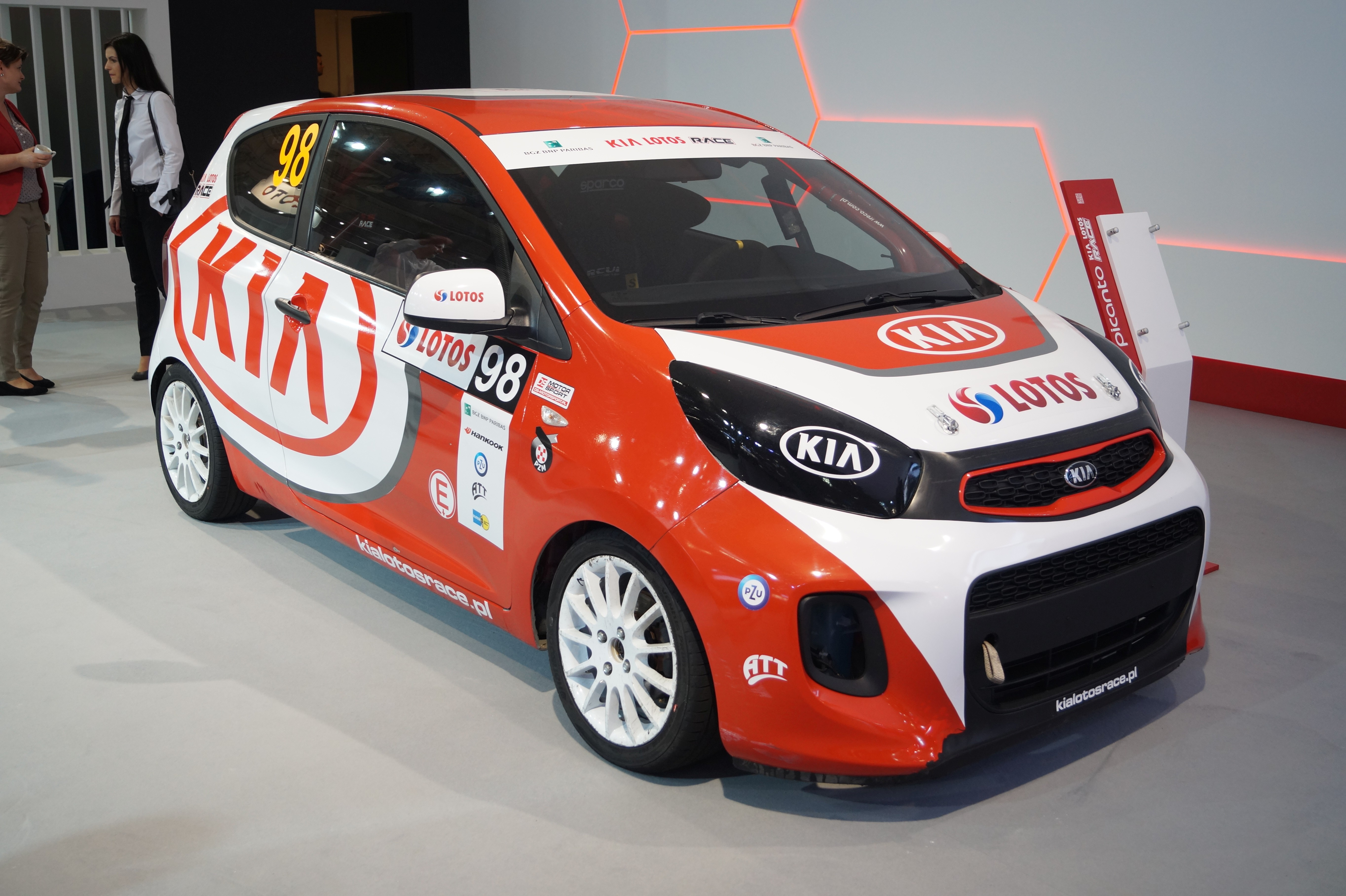
Kia Lotos Race-spec Picanto.

The Picanto is an official race car in Poland's Kia Platinum Cup, a racing organization created by Kia Motors Polska and Polish Automobile and Motorcycle Association. The organization started in 2006 as the Kia Picanto Cup before establishing a partnership with Grupa Lotos to form the Kia Lotos Race a year later. Following the 2017 season, the organization was changed to Kia Platinum Cup after PKN Orlen replaced Grupa Lotos as the title sponsor.

The Morning is also an official race car in the Korea Speed Festival.

In 2018, the Kia Picanto GT Cup was established in Portugal by Kia Motors Portugal and CRM Motorsport.

== Chinese copy controversy ==
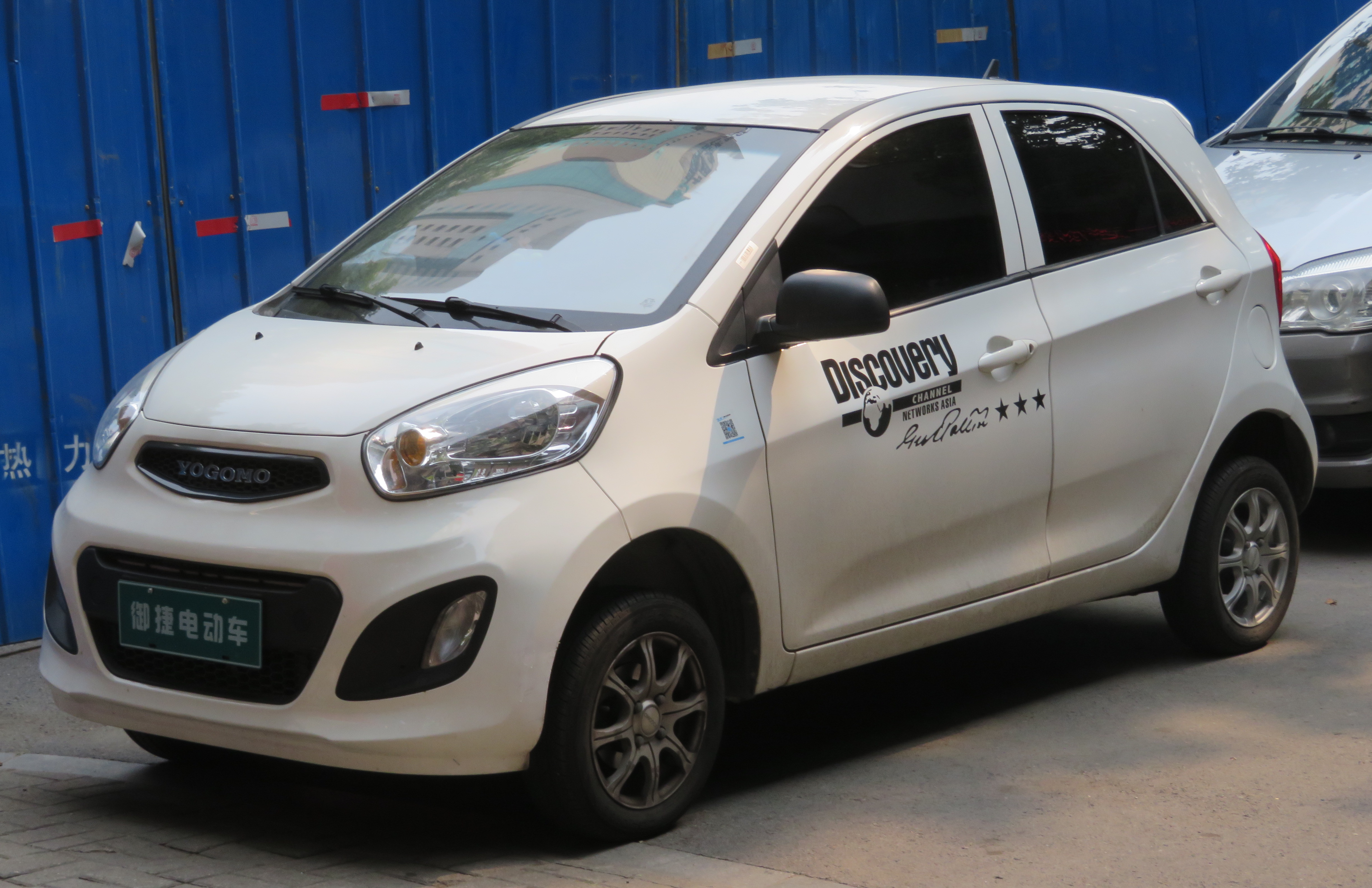
Yogomo 330 electric car.

In 2015, a Chinese low-speed electric vehicle manufacturer Yogomo released the Yogomo 330 electric car, which is a near-exact copy of the second generation Picanto.

== Sales ==
The Picanto was Kia's best selling vehicle in Europe from 2004 to 2006, accounting for a third of the brand sales volumes during these years.

Calendar year	South Korea	Europe	Colombia	Australia	Malaysia (Note: Figures based on registration (Malaysia))		
Calendar year	South Korea	Europe	Colombia	Australia	Kia Picanto	Naza Picanto	Naza Suria
2004		58,579			1,002		
2005		85,314			2,226		
2006		76,550			878	1	656
2007		60,996			71	0	4,362
2008		39,483			94	0	2,697
2009		55,604			57	54	1,052
2010	101,570	46,262			7	780	30
2011	117,029	51,137			48	894	0
2012	94,190	58,175			2	31	0
2013	93,631	50,524			281	0	0
2014	96,089	51,222			1,651		
2015	88,455	54,036			872		
2016	75,133	54,982			178		
2017	70,437	62,161		3,323	116		
2018	59,042	74,526		5,394	2,053		
2019	50,364	74,305		5,237	1,330		
2020	38,766	49,211	5,261	3,891	67		
2021	30,530	59,949	8,719	6,591	1		
2022	29,380	51,962	9,975	5,196	4		
2023	25,879	68,574	5,604	7,706	1		
2024	15,835	64,757	5,789	5,822	1		
2025				7,166			
