= Nio =

Nio or NIO may refer to:

- NI Opera, Opera company
- Nio (Buddhism), guardians of the Buddha
- Nio (electronic literature), interactive software for audio and poetry by Jim Andrews
- Nio Inc., a Chinese electric automobile manufacturer
- Nicaraguan córdoba, currency by ISO 4217 currency code
- National Institute of Oceanography (disambiguation), several organizations
- National Institute of Ophthalmology (disambiguation), several organizations
- Neurotechnology Industry Organization
- Non-blocking I/O (usually "NIO"), a collection of Java programming language APIs introduced with the J2SE 1.4 release of Java by Sun Microsystems
- Northern Ireland Office, an arm of the United Kingdom government, responsible for Northern Ireland affairs
- Northern Ireland Open (darts), darts tournament
- Northern Ireland Open (golf), gold tournament
- Northern Ireland Open (snooker), snooker tournament
- Nickel(II) oxide, NiO
- Liang (surname), pronounced and romanized as Nio in several southern Chinese variants

== See also ==
- Ios (aka: Nios, Greek: Νιός), an island in Greece
- Nios (disambiguation)
- Ni-0 zero-valent oxidation state, see nickel
- NLO (disambiguation)
- N10 (disambiguation)
