= Nios =

Nios or NIOS may refer to:

== Places ==
- Ios or Nios, a Greek island

== Computing ==
- Network I/O System, Digital Research's NIOS component in CP/NET in the 1980s
- NetWare I/O Subsystem, Novell's NIOS component in the 32-bit network clients in the mid-1990s
- Nios embedded processor, Altera 16-bit embedded processor
  - Nios II, Altera 32-bit embedded processor

== Other uses ==
- National Institute of Open Schooling, the board of education in India
- Hyundai Grand i10 Nios, a 2019–present Korean-Indian city car

== See also ==
- NetBIOS
- Lake Nyos, a crater lake in Cameroon
- NIO (disambiguation), for the singular of NIOs
