= 10N =

10N may refer to:

- Nitrogen-10 (^{10}N), an isotope of nitrogen
- List of highways numbered 10N, various highways
- Powers of 10, or 10 multiplied by itself n times, sometimes written as 10^{n}

== See also ==
- N10 (disambiguation)
