= NLO =

NLO may refer to:

- Naval Live Oaks Reservation, Florida, United States
- New London Orchestra, London, England
- Next to Leading Order, in the scientific context; see Leading-order term § Next-to-leading order
- NLO (magazine), Russian print issue
- Nonlinear optics material
- Norman Lockyer Observatory, Sidmouth, Devon, England
- Nuffield Laboratory of Ophthalmology, Oxford, England
- NLO TV, a defunct Ukrainian television channel

== See also ==
- NIO (disambiguation)
- N10 (disambiguation)
