= N10 =

N10 may refer to:

== Roads ==
- N10 (South Africa)
- N10 highway, Philippines
- N10 highway (Cameroon)
- N10 road (Ghana)
- N10 road (Ireland)
- Makran Coastal Highway, Pakistan
- Nebraska Highway 10, United States
- Route nationale 10, France

== Vehicles ==
- LNER Class N10, a class of British steam locomotives
- Nieuport 10, a French sesquiplane
- Nissan Pulsar (N10), a Japanese car
- Toyota Hilux (N10), a Japanese pickup

== Other uses ==
- Intel i860 XR, a microprocessor
- Interstitial nephritis
- London Buses route N10
- Nitrogen-10, an isotope of nitrogen
- Northern 10 Athletic Conference
- N10, a postcode district in the N postcode area for London

== See also ==
- Ni-0 zero-valent oxidation state, see nickel
- 10N (disambiguation)
- NLO (disambiguation)
- NIO (disambiguation)
