= Neurotechnology Industry Organization =

The Neurotechnology Industry Organization (NIO) is a San Francisco, California based non-profit trade association that represents a broad spectrum of companies involved in neuroscience, brain research centers, and advocacy groups from around the globe. Operating as a coalition of organizations in the field of neurotechnology, the goal of NIO is to enhance awareness of brain and nervous system illnesses, as well as to promote and advocate for treatment and diagnostic options.

== See also ==
- Brain-computer interface
- Brain implant
- Neuroprosthetics
- Neural Engineering
- Transcranial magnetic stimulation
- Enablement (disambiguation)
