= NLO (magazine) =

Russian ufology magazine

- Categories: Ufology, paranormal
- Frequency: Weekly
- Founded: 1994
- Country: Russia
- Language: Russian
- ISSN: 1560-2788

NLO (Russian: НЛО, acronym for Невероятное, Легендарное, Очевидное (Incredible, Legendary, Obvious)) was a Russian magazine about ufology, paranormal phenomena and history published by Kaleydoskop publishing house. First published in 1994 as a newspaper, the publication shifted to a magazine format in 1998. The editorial board included prominent Russian ufologist Vladimir Azhazha.

The magazine format is A4. The publication repeatedly changed its design and logo, being a newspaper, magazine and, most recently, a newspaper-like magazine. According to the Russian National Print Run Service, NLO's stated print run of 200,000 has been inflated, being three times higher than the actual one (64,337).
