= Hyundai BlueOn =

Battery electric city car

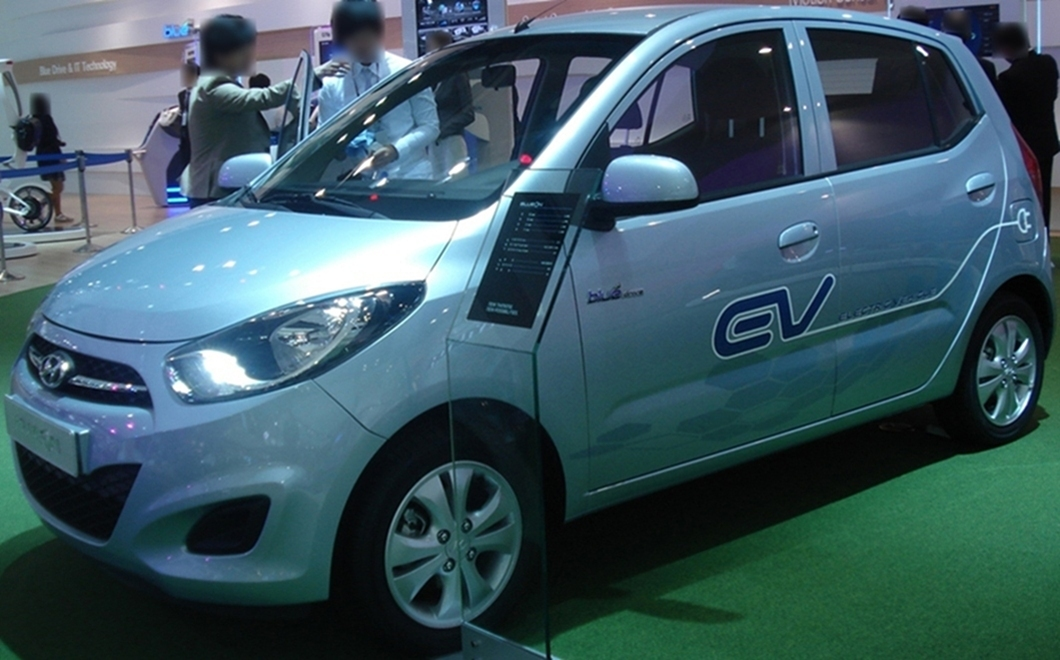
Hyundai BlueOn at the 2010 Seoul Motor Show.

The Hyundai BlueOn (Korean: 현대 블루온) was a limited-production 5-door hatchback battery electric city car produced by Hyundai Motor Company in 2009–2010. According to the manufacturer, the Blue-on all-electric range is 140 km (87 mi) and has a top speed of over 130 km/h (81 mph). Field testing with 30 units began in South Korea by late 2010 and sales in the domestic market were scheduled for late 2012.

The BlueOn is based on the first generation i10, a vehicle not sold in South Korea and targeted at global emerging markets. The vehicle qualifies for South Korea's light car (Korean: 경차 category, which offers tax incentives for vehicles with exterior dimensions below 3,600 mm (141.7 in) in length and 1,600 mm (63.0 in) in width.

== History ==
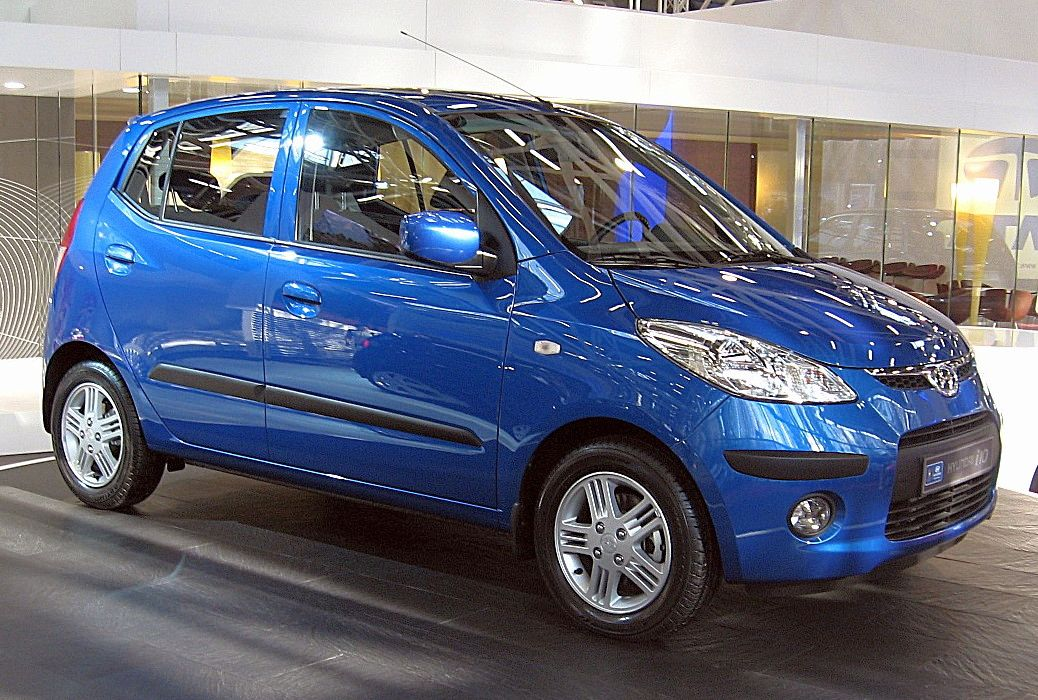
The BlueOn is based on the Hyundai i10.

According to Hyundai Motor Company, the total investment to develop the BlueOn, its first production electric car, was around 40 billion won (US$34.3 million). The prototype, an electric version of i10, was first unveiled at the International Motor Show Germany 2009 in Frankfurt. The pre-production testing model was unveiled in Seoul in September 2010, when the first of 30 units were delivered to South Korean government agencies for field testing. The carmaker planned to build 2,500 units by the end of 2012, but sales were limited to the South Korean market.

== Main features ==
The BlueOn is equipped with a 16.4 kWh lithium polymer (Li–Poly) battery pack and charges in 6 hours with a 220 V power outlet and in 25 minutes to 80% with three-phase electric power (in a 380 V outlet). The maximum speed is 130 km/h (81 mph) and 0–100 km/h is achieved in 13.1 seconds. The BlueOn has a range of 140 km (87 mi) on a single charge.

The BlueOn is based on the Hyundai i10 and features an electric warning sound developed by Hyundai called the Virtual Engine Sound System (VESS). The warning system will be included in the BlueOn test fleet and it will provide synthetic audio feedback mimicking the sound of an internal combustion engine (ICE).

== See also ==
- Hyundai Elantra LPI Hybrid
- Hyundai i10
- Hyundai Santa Fe
- List of electric cars currently available
