= Enablement =

Enablement refers to any act of enabling.

Specific usages of the word enablement include:

- Application enablement
- Mobile sales enablement
- Supplier enablement, the process of electronically connecting suppliers to a company's supply chain
- Sufficiency of disclosure in patent law
