= List of highways numbered 10N =

The following highways are numbered 10N.

== United States ==
- U.S. Route 10N (Montana) (former)
- U.S. Route 10N (Minnesota) (former)
- New Jersey Route 10N (former)

== See also ==
- List of highways numbered 10
