= Hyundai i10 =

City car manufactured by Hyundai

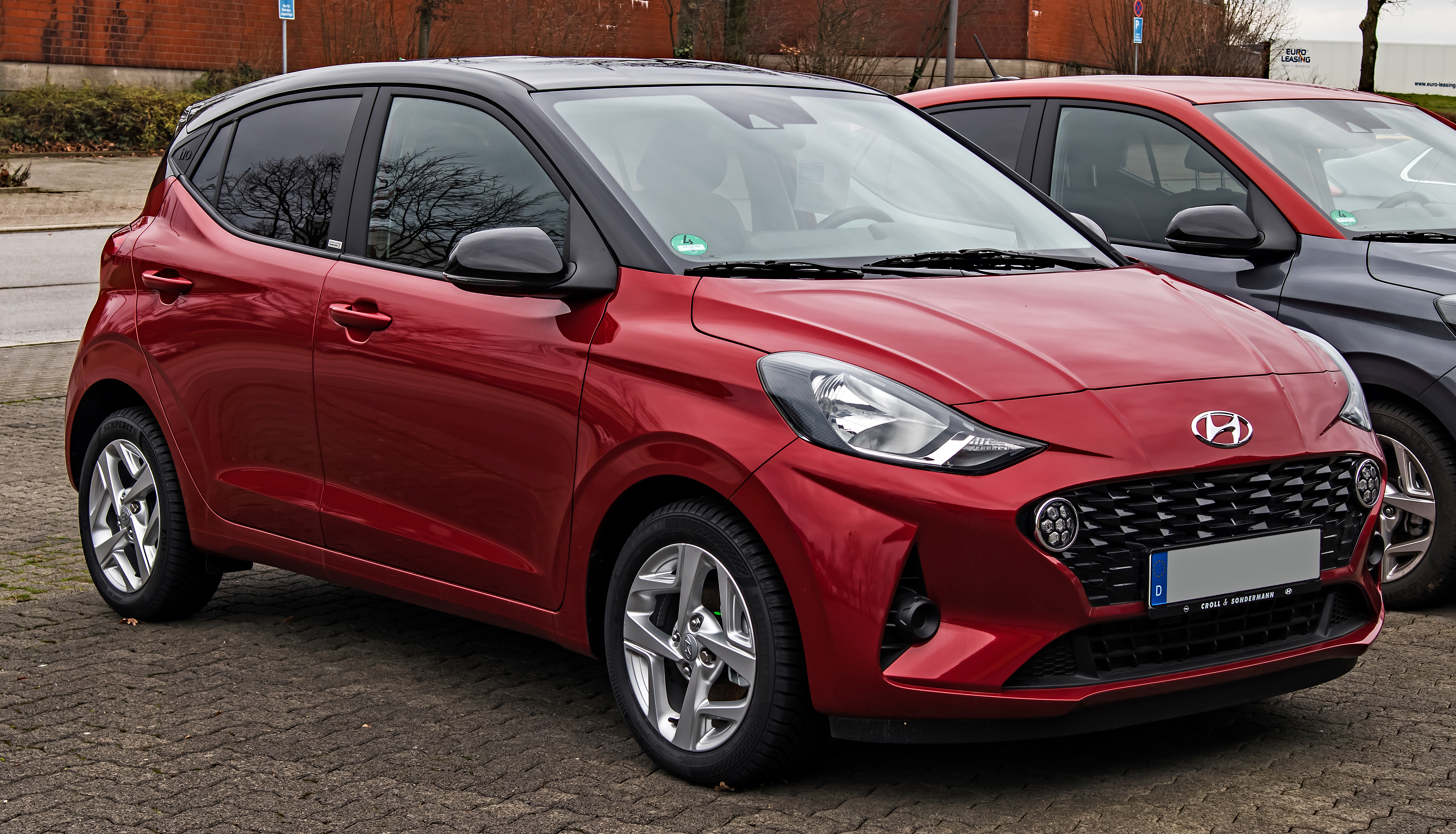
- Hyundai i10 (AC3)

Overview
- Manufacturer: Hyundai Motor Company
- Production: 2007–present

Body and chassis
- Class: City car (A)
- Layout: Front-engine, front-wheel-drive
- Related: Kia Picanto

Chronology
- Predecessor: Hyundai Atos

The Hyundai i10 is a city car produced by the South Korean manufacturer Hyundai since 2007. It replaced the Hyundai Atos in the model line-up, and was initially available only as a five-door hatchback body style. The third generation i10 was unveiled in India on 7 August 2019 and launched on 20 August 2019, offered in 10 variants across petrol and diesel engines as well as manual and automatic transmissions. There are also sedan derivatives, the Hyundai Xcent and the Hyundai Aura.

== First generation (PA; 2007) ==
First generation
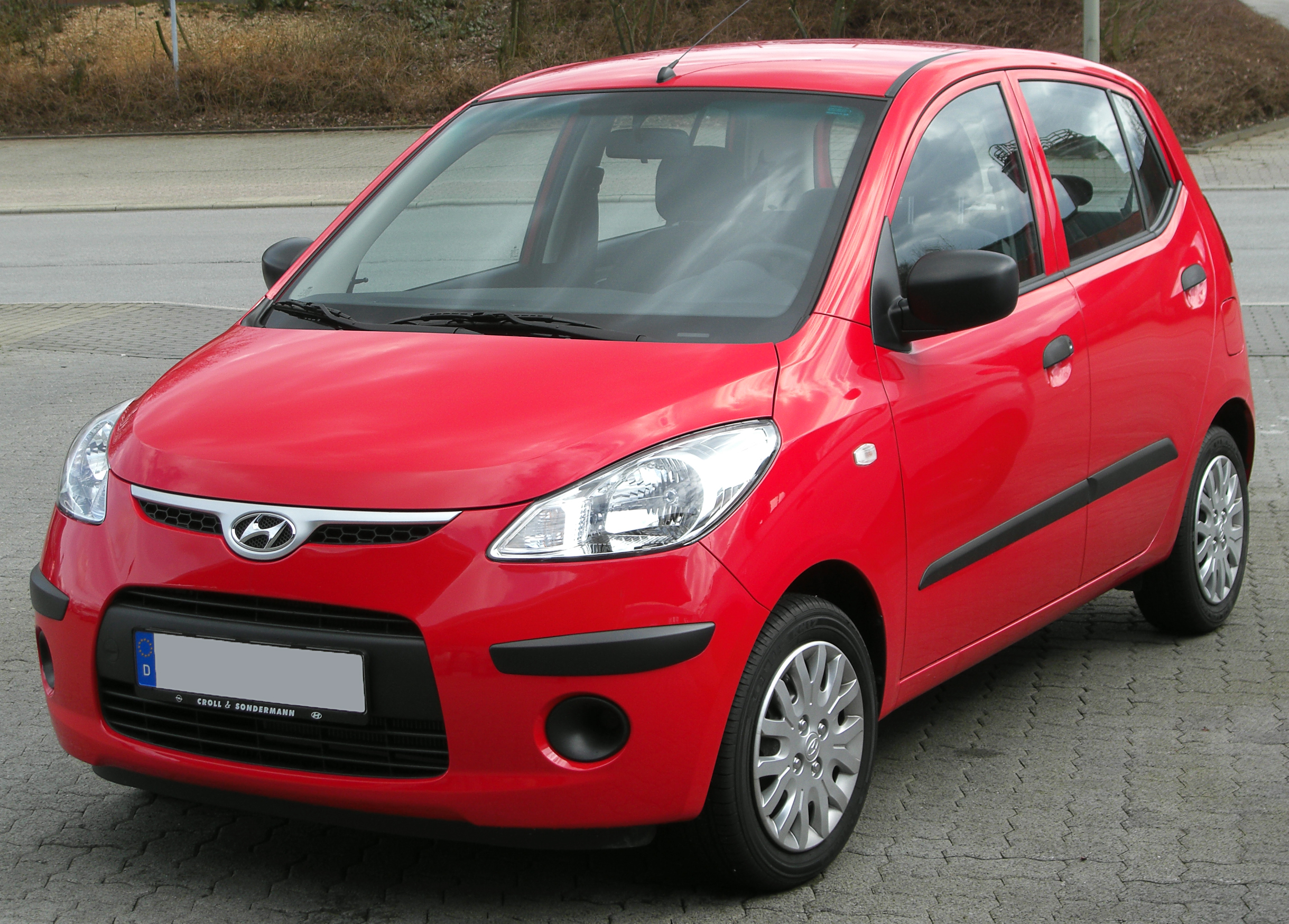

Overview
- Model code: PA
- Also called: Dodge i10 (Mexico); Inokom i10 (Malaysia)
- Production: 2007–2015
- Assembly: India: Chennai (HMIL); Vietnam: Ninh Bình (HTMV); Malaysia: Kulim (Inokom); Indonesia: Bekasi (HIM)
- Designer: Thomas Bürkle

Body and chassis
- Body style: 5-door hatchback
- Platform: Hyundai-Kia SA
- Related: Kia Picanto (SA)

Powertrain
- Engine: Petrol: 1.0 L Kappa II I3; 1.1 L Epsilon I4 (2007–2013); 1.2 L Kappa I4 (2008–2013); Diesel: 1.1 L U-Line I3
- Transmission: 5-speed manual; 4-speed automatic

Dimensions
- Wheelbase: 2,380 mm (93.7 in)
- Length: 3,565 mm (140.4 in)
- Width: 1,595 mm (62.8 in)
- Height: 1,550 mm (61.0 in)
- Curb weight: 925–1,040 kg (2,039–2,293 lb)

The first generation i10 was announced on 31 October 2007 in New Delhi, India. It was produced in India at Hyundai's Chennai plant for the domestic and export markets.

In India, it originally had three different variants: D-Lite, Era and Magna with only 1.1L iDREZ engine. Integrated CD music system, Electric sunroof and Remote key are optional only in Magna Variant. In July 2008, Hyundai added two variants Sportz and Asta and an additional engine: 1.2-litre Kappa engine.

In Europe, it has four different versions: Classic, Style, Comfort and Eco Blue Version, with a 1.0 liter engine. All versions come with four airbags, ABS, front electric windows, air conditioning and an RDS radio/CD player. Higher versions have heated front seats, electric sunroof, start-stop system, and, optional, there is ESP.

=== Background ===
Hyundai started development of the i10 to replace the Hyundai Atos. The development for the concept was codenamed Hyundai PA. The car was targeted primarily at the Indian market and intended for production in India, given the popularity of hatchback subcompacts in the country.

=== Styling ===
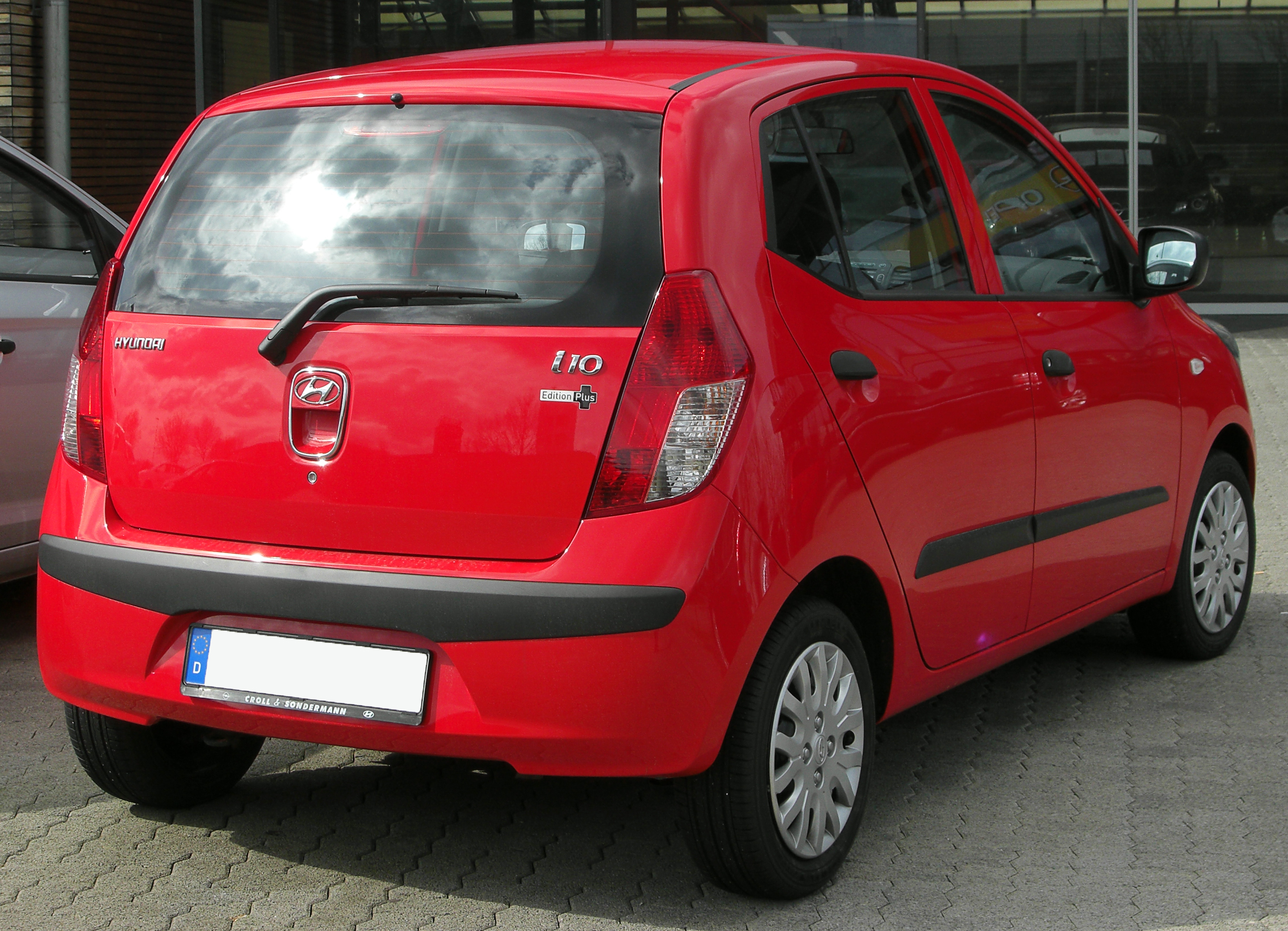
Rear view (pre-facelift)

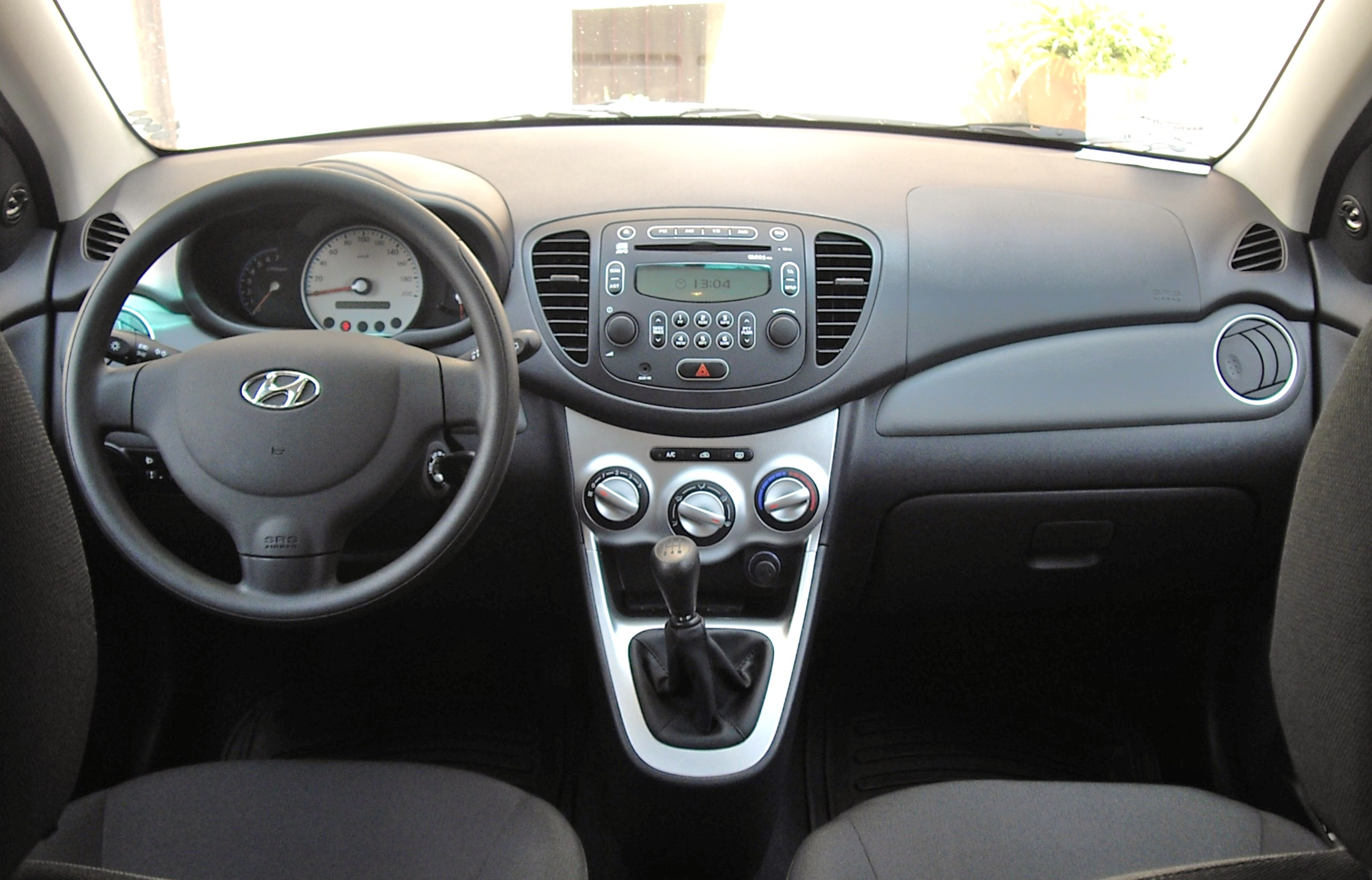
Interior

The i10 has a large air dam, pulled-back headlamps, chrome lined grille, fog lamps, and a rear window with an up swept kink.

The tailgate has a chrome lined boot release handle, and a roof spoiler on the top end versions.

Overall length (3,565 mm) and wheelbase (2,380 mm) are identical to the Atos with slightly more interior space; Ergonomic design was intended to accommodate tall drivers and increasing rear knee room. The width has been increased (and front and rear track) by 70 mm (2.8 in) for more shoulder room. The height has been reduced by 40 mm (1.6 in). Boot space, at 225 litres (7.9 cu ft), is significantly lower than that of Getz.

==== Interior ====
The interior has a plastic dash housing with an optional integrated stereo. The instrument binnacle has a large white faced speedometer, flanked by the tachometer and fuel and temperature gauges.

The gear shifter is built into the center console, leaving space between the front seats for two cup holders.

=== Facelift ===
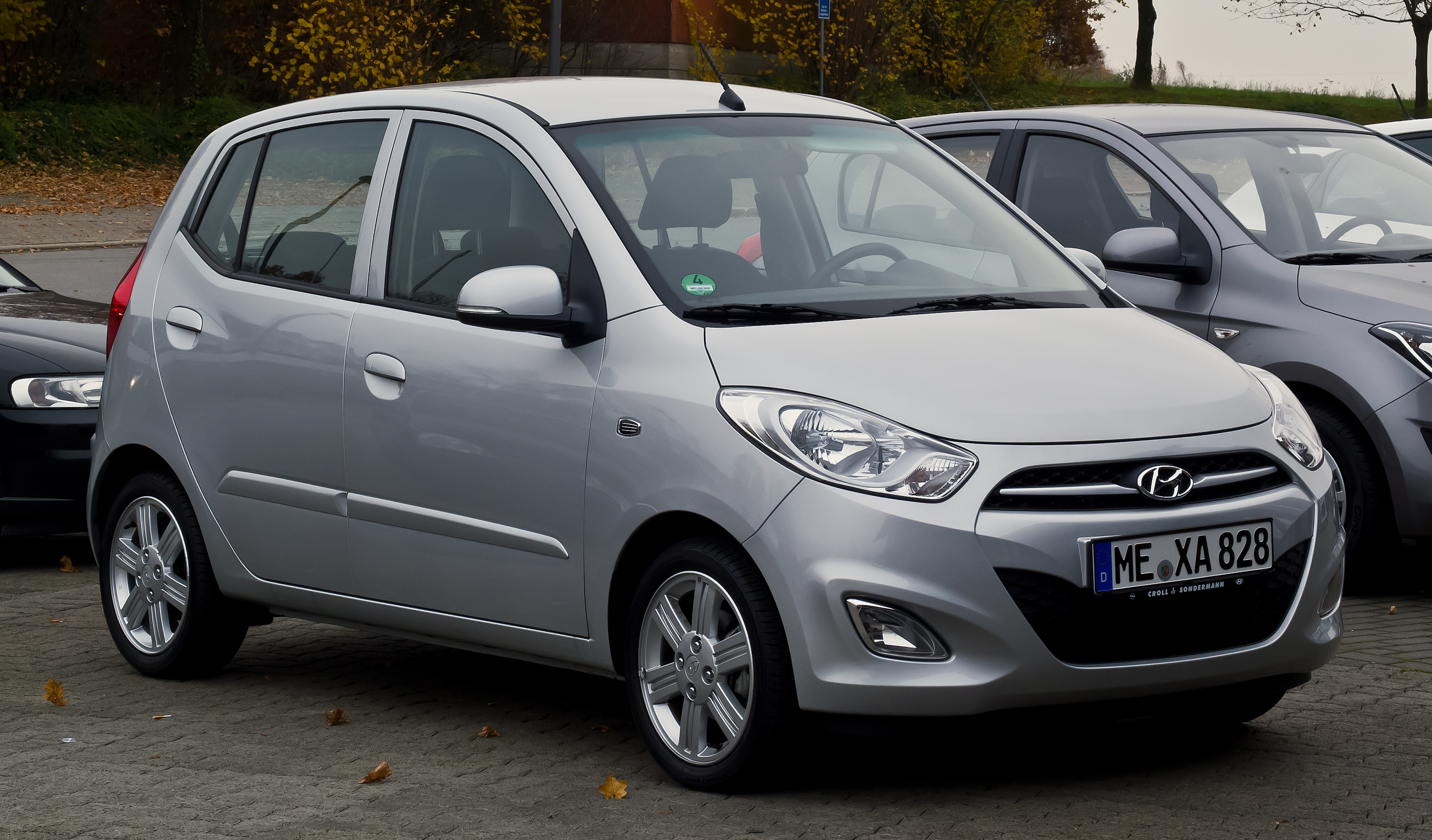

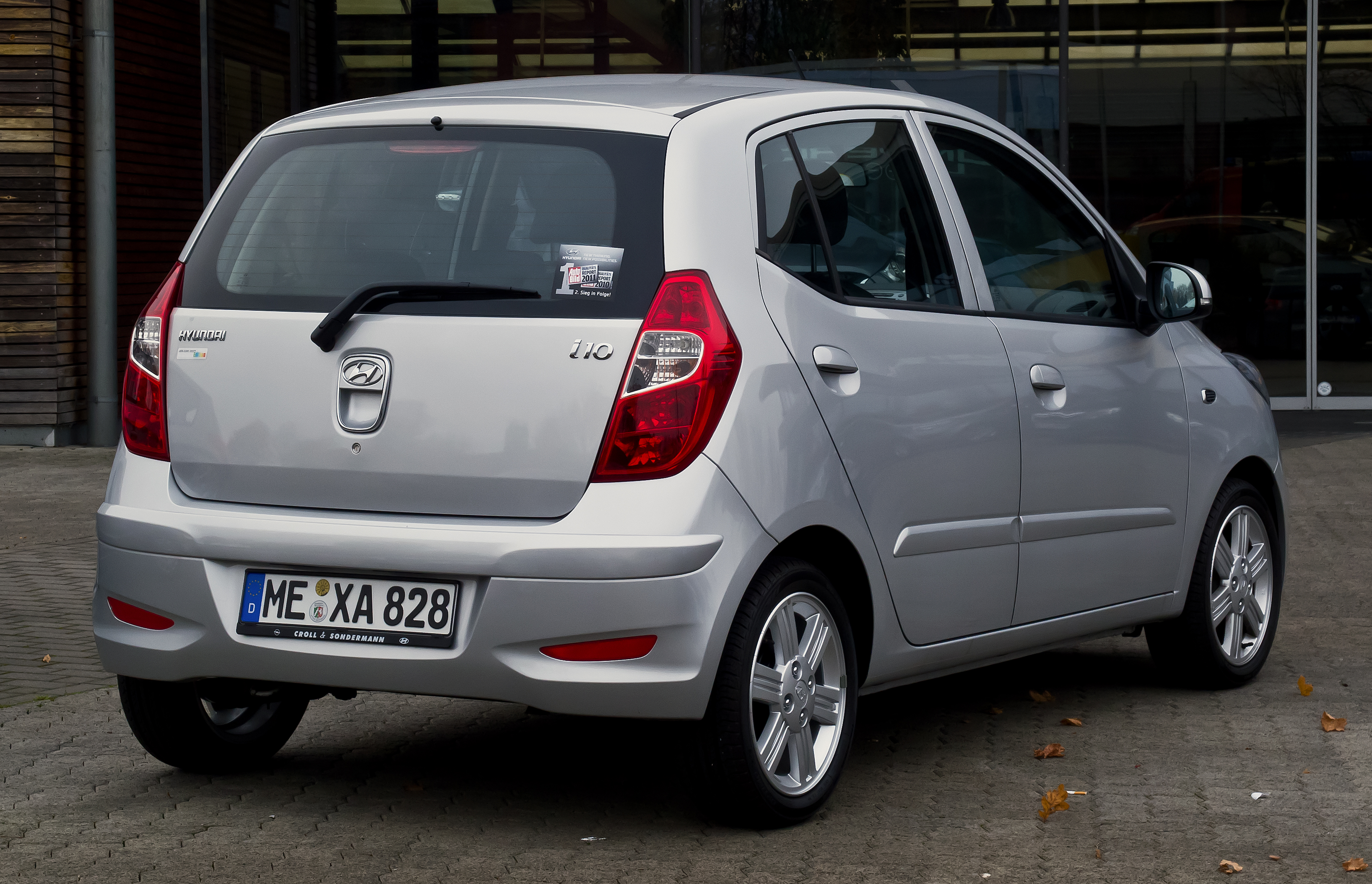
October 17, 2010 facelift

On September 23, 2010, Hyundai revealed a facelift for the i10 in India, making it available for pre-order and then for test drives. On October 17, 2010, the facelifted i10 officially debuted in the Indian market and became available for purchase. Although the facelift was introduced, production of the pre-facelift model did not cease until late October 2010 and continued to be sold in several regions until the end of the year. In other countries, the facelift was released after the end in 2010, mostly in 2011.

==== Exterior ====
Hyundai introduced a new front end design inspired by the 'Fluidic Sculpture' design language with new, less angled headlights.

The rear tail lamps and bumper were redesigned with new reflectors.

==== Interior ====
The i10 has a two tone beige and light brown color in certain markets. The interior features chrome and silver accents and a new instrument cluster with a gear shift indicator display (on manual models) and a digital fuel indicator.

=== Engines ===
The i10 was launched with a 1.1 liter 48 kW (65 PS; 64 hp) I4 iRDE engine, the same motor as used in the Kia Picanto and Hyundai Atos Prime/Santro Xing but with lower CO_{2} emissions. The i10 also came with a 1.2 liter gasoline, Euro 5 compliant engine (called the Kappa engine), with the same CO_{2} emissions as the 1.1L version. The spark plug of the 1.2L is non-standard. A 1.1-litre, three-cylinder diesel CRDi variant was available in the European and Indian markets.

In 2010 Hyundai launched a facelifted version of the i10 in India which received a Kappa II engine with VTVT Variable valve timing.

==== i10 Electric ====
Hyundai unveiled the i10 concept Electric at the 2010 Delhi Auto Expo, which led to the production of the i10-based electric vehicle called BlueOn in South Korea in 2010.

=== Reception ===
The i10 was recognized as "Car of the Year 2008" by various automotive magazines and television channels in India, like BS Motoring, CNBC-TV18 AutoCar, NDTV Profit Car & Bike India and Overdrive magazine. The car was conferred with the Indian Car of the Year (ICOTY) by automotive media of the country.

In Malaysia, the Hyundai i10 has also earned recognition through awards such as the Best People's Car in the Asian Auto – VCA Auto Industry Awards 2009, 1st Place in Asian Auto-Mudah.my Fuel Efficiency Awards 2009 in the Compact City Cars Category with a combined fuel efficiency of 5.0 L/100 km, which is not only the best performance in its category but also throughout all the participating vehicles in Malaysia.

The Hyundai i10 also won the New Straits Times / Maybank Car of the Year Award in the Entry Level Car category two times consecutively in 2009 and 2010.

In 2008, Hyundai commemorated 10 years of operations in India by initiating a transcontinental drive from Delhi to Paris in two of its i10 Kappa cars. The drive covered a distance of 10,000 kilometres (6,200 mi) in just 17 days after which the i10s were showcased at the Paris Motor Show in October.

In 2009, the i10 became a popular buy in the United Kingdom during the Government Scrappage Scheme.

In 2013, automotive portal CarDekho awarded Hyundai i10 as 'Most Popular Hatchback' in India.

=== Safety ===
Euro NCAP test results for a LHD, five door hatchback variant on a registration of 2008:

Test	Score	Points
Overall:	N/A	N/A
Adult occupant:	4/5 stars	26
Child occupant:	4/5 stars	37
Pedestrian:	3/4 stars	21
Safety assist:	N/A	N/A

ASEAN NCAP test results for a RHD, 5-door hatchback variant on a 2011 registration:

ASEAN NCAP test results Hyundai i10 (2012)
Test	Points	Stars
Adult occupant:	7.31	2 /5 stars
Child occupant:	48%	0 /5 stars
Safety assist:	NA	

The amount of safety features varies from market to market. While most countries have the i10 equipped with airbags for all passengers, the entry level 1.1 manual transmission model in the Philippines can be sold without airbags. Since launch and as of August 2009, electronic stability control (ESC) was an order option for United Kingdom spec cars which prevents a five star Euro NCAP score.

Global NCAP 1.0 test results (India) Hyundai i10 – No Airbags (2014, similar to Latin NCAP 2013)
Test	Score	Stars
Adult occupant protection	0.00/17.00	0 /5 stars
Child occupant protection	6.97/49.00	1 /5 stars

=== India ===
After the success of Hyundai Santro, Hyundai launched the i10 in 2007. The i10 slotted between Santro and Getz (later replaced by i20).

In India, the first generation i10 was available in nine variants, and with two different engine options which is a 1.1L gasoline engine with manual transmission gearbox. This engine produces 66.7 PS (49 kW; 66 hp) and maximum torque of 10.1 kg⋅m (99 N⋅m; 73 lb⋅ft). The other engine is a 1.2 L Kappa engine which produces 80 PS (59 kW; 79 hp) of maximum power and 11.4 kg⋅m (112 N⋅m; 82 lb⋅ft) of maximum torque.

== Second generation (IA/BA; 2013) ==
Second generation
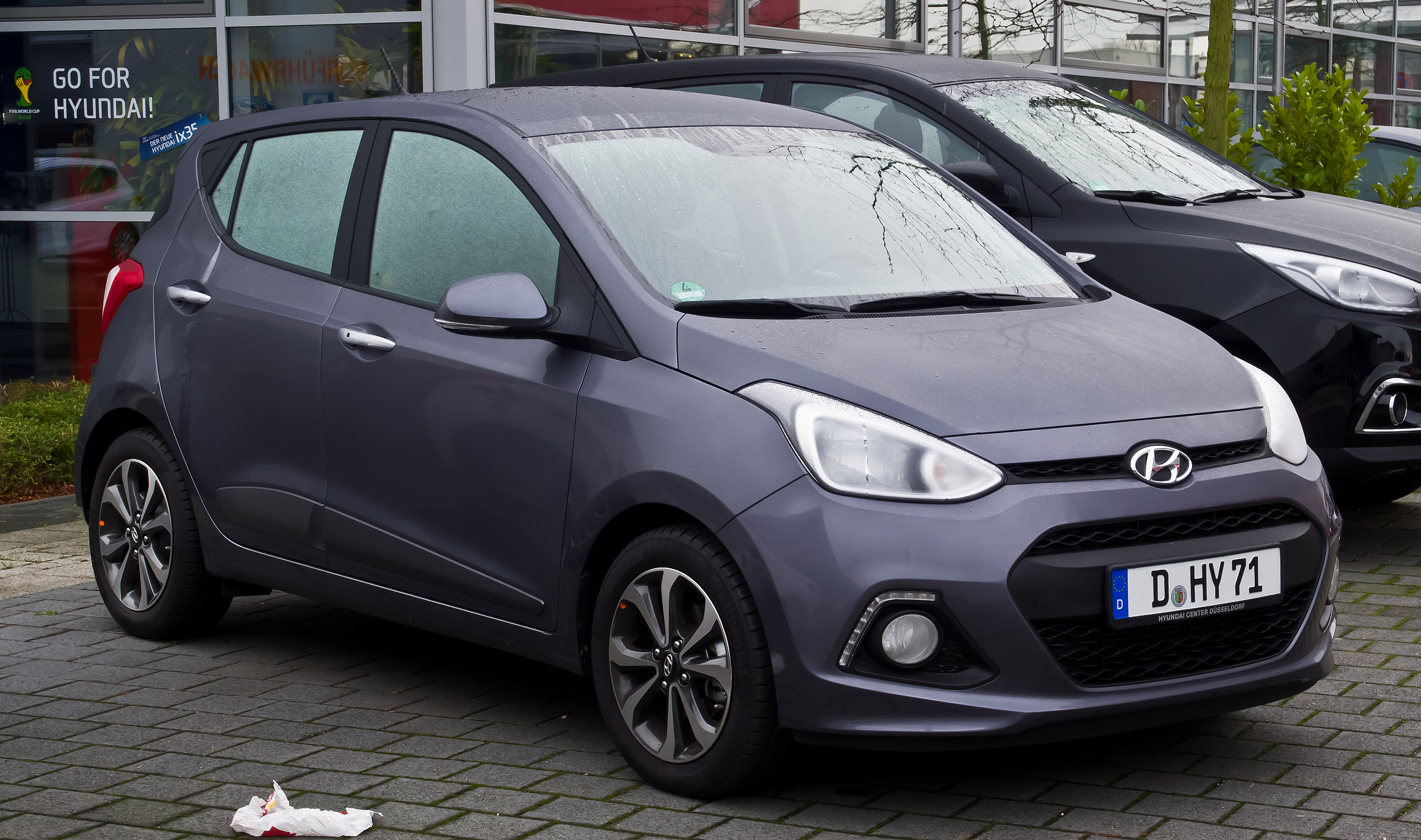
- 2013 Hyundai i10 1.2 Style (IA; pre-facelift)

Overview
- Model code: IA; BA (Grand i10)
- Also called: Hyundai Grand i10 (BA); Hyundai Grand i (Laos); Hyundai Gran Metro Taxi Hatchback (Colombia); Hyundai Xcent (sedan)
- Production: 2013–2022
- Assembly: Turkey: Izmit (Hyundai Assan Otomotiv); India: Chennai (HMIL); Ecuador: Quito (Aymesa); Vietnam: Ninh Bình (HTMV); Algeria: Tiaret (TMC); Iran: Bam, Kerman (KMC); Mozambique: Matola (Somyoung Motors)
- Designer: Thomas Bürkle

Body and chassis
- Body style: 5-door hatchback 4-door sedan
- Platform: Hyundai-Kia BA
- Related: Hyundai Xcent; Kia Picanto (TA)

Powertrain
- Engine: Petrol: 1.0 L Kappa II MPi I3; 1.2 L Kappa II MPi I4; Petrol/LPG: 1.0 L Kappa II LPi I3; Diesel: 1.1 L U II CRDi I3
- Transmission: 5-speed manual; 4-speed automatic

Dimensions
- Wheelbase: 2,385 mm (93.9 in); 2,425 mm (95.5 in) (BA)
- Length: 3,645 mm (143.5 in); 3,765 mm (148.2 in) (BA)
- Width: 1,660 mm (65.4 in)
- Height: 1,500 mm (59.1 in); BA: 1,520 mm (59.8 in); Grand i10X: 1,655 mm (65.2 in)
- Curb weight: 933–961 kg (2,057–2,119 lb)

Originally planned for release in the beginning of 2014, the development of the new i10 started in India in 2012, using the Kia Picanto as a test mule for individual parts.

In August 2013, the i10s redesign was revealed by Hyundai's European design team led by Thomas Bürkle. The new car was 80 mm (3.1 in) longer, 65 mm (2.6 in) wider and 50 mm (2.0 in) lower than the previous model. The new dimensions result in a trunk space increase by 10%, totaling to 252 liters. Most versions can seat five occupants.

The new car made its debut at the Frankfurt Motor Show in September 2013. The i10 arrived in European showrooms in January 2014.

Production of the i10 commenced at Hyundai Assan Otomotiv's plant in İzmit, Turkey, in the end of September 2013, at an annual capacity of 200,000 units.

In addition to the previous generation, its equipment includes, depending on the version, automatic air conditioning, daytime running lights, curtain airbags, Tyre pressure monitoring system, hill-start-assist, and as options – cruise control, rear parking sensors, heated steering wheel and front seats or 15-inch alloy wheels.

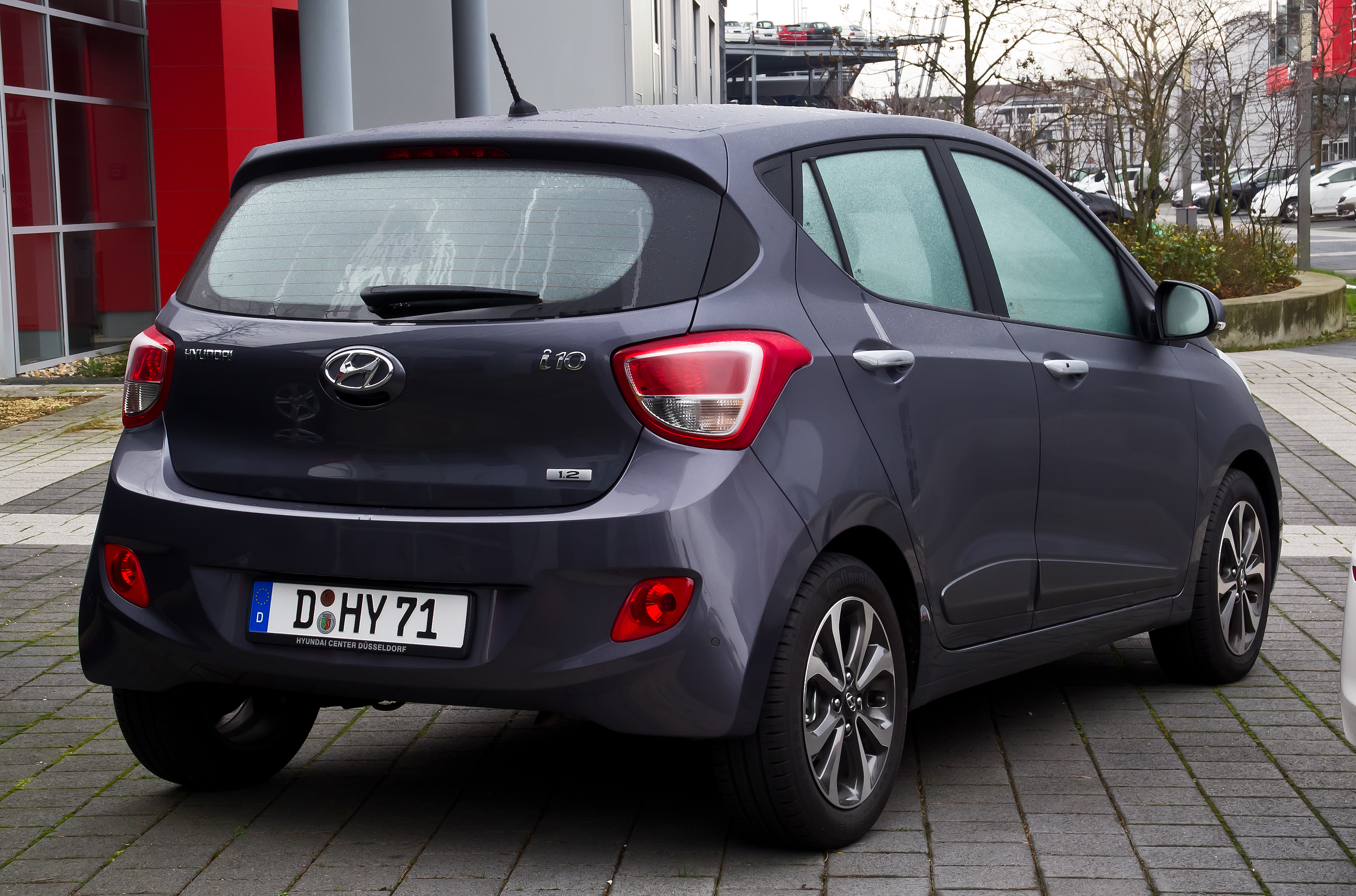
2013 Hyundai i10 1.2 Style (IA; pre-facelift)

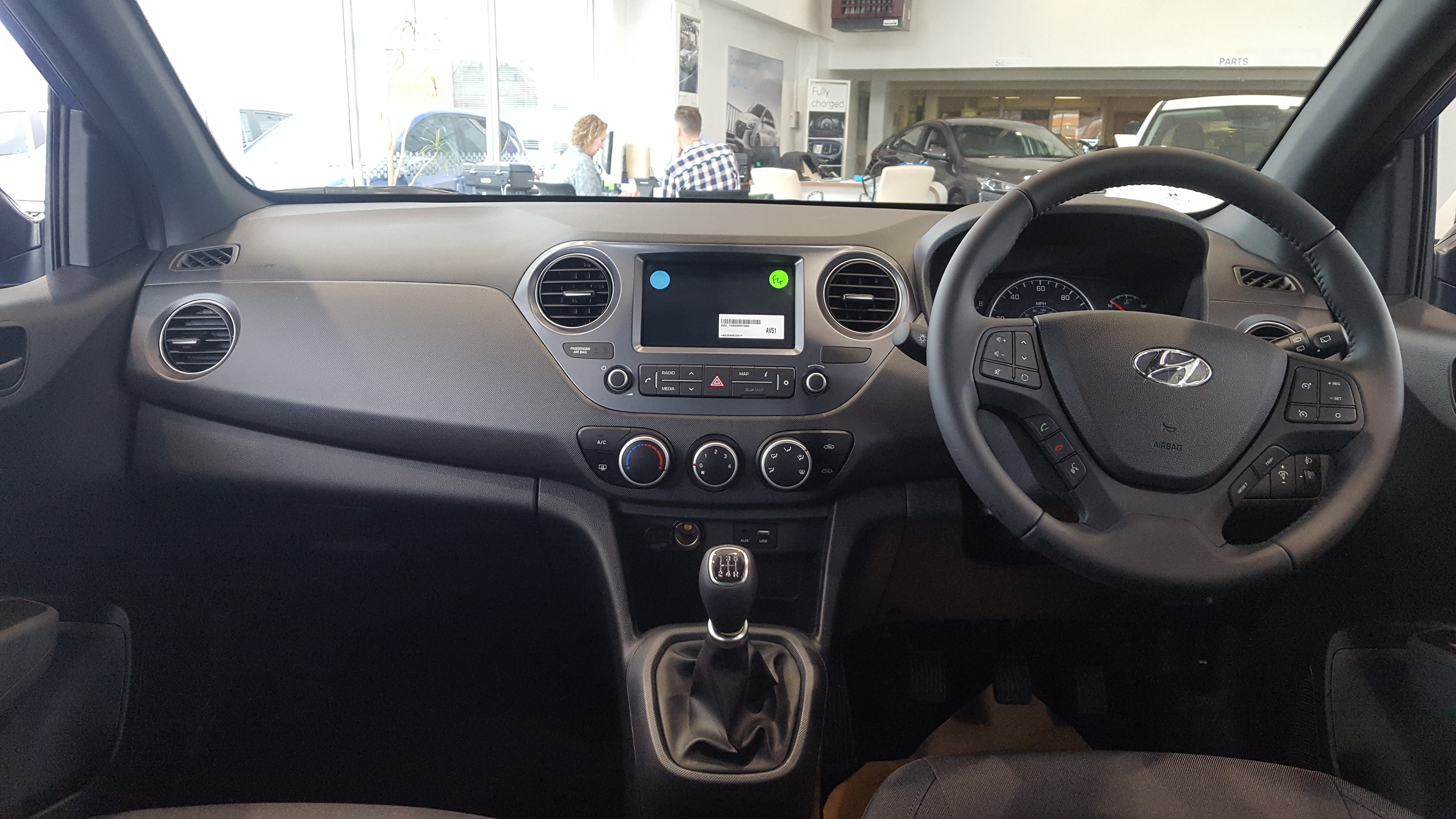
Interior (facelift)

=== Facelift ===
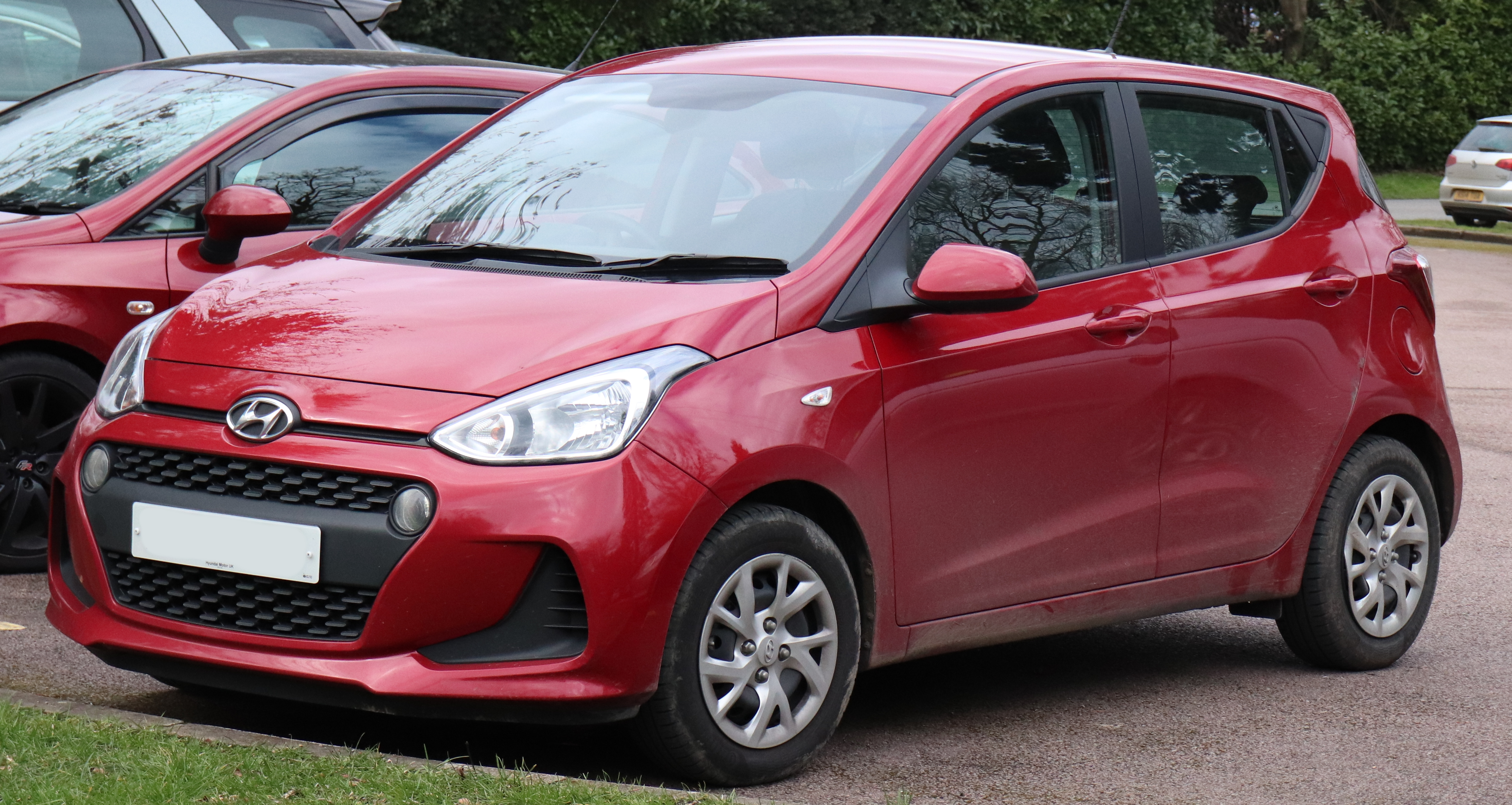
2017 Hyundai i10 SE Automatic 1.2 (IA; facelift)

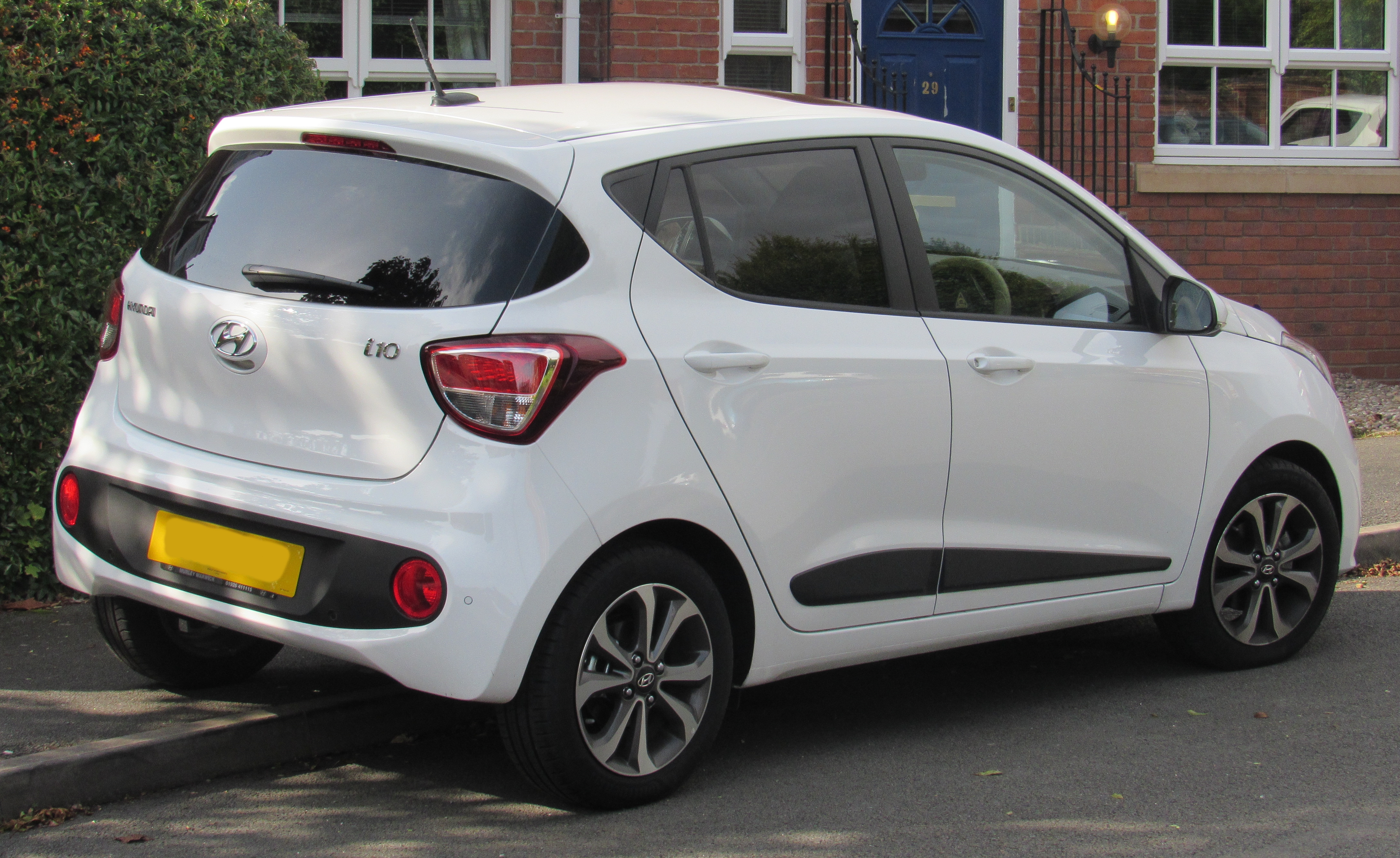
2017 Hyundai i10 Premium SE Automatic 1.2 (IA; facelift)

=== Grand i10 (BA) ===
Hyundai Motor India released the model in September 2013 as the Grand i10. The Grand i10 differentiates from the European model with its wheelbase increase by 40 mm (1.6 in). The Grand i10 offers dual toned interiors, enlarged cabin space, keyless entry, push button on/off and auto folding outside mirrors that automatically open and fold when car is unlocked and locked. In addition, the car is equipped with rear AC vents and 1GB internal memory to store music, which are both first in its segment.

In February 2014, Hyundai Asia Resources, Inc. (HARI) announced details on the Philippine market version of the Grand i10. The base models come with the 1.0-liter three cylinder gasoline engine while the 1.2-liter four cylinder engine is reserved for the range topping L automatic transmission model.

In the beginning of 2014, Hyundai released the Grand i10 in Mexico. The car is offered with only the 1.2-liter, four-cylinder engine in the market.

In Colombia a taxi model is sold under the name Hyundai Gran Metro Taxi Hatchback.

In 2019, Hyundai launched a two-seat commercial vehicle in South Africa, called the Hyundai Grand i10 Cargo. It was available in 1.0 Fluid or 1.25 Motion trims and has a 1,202-litre (42.4 cu ft) load space.

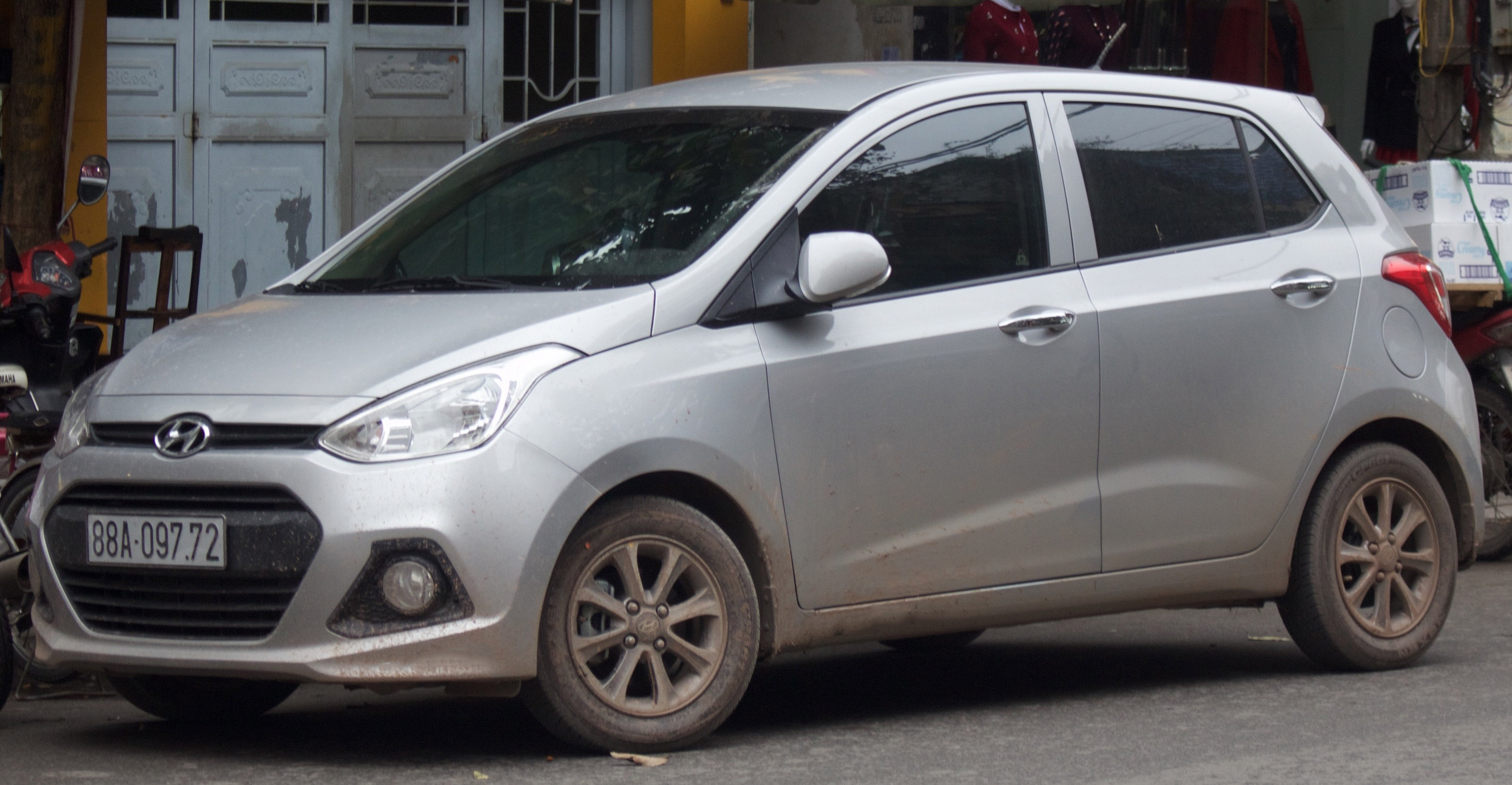
Hyundai Grand i10 (Vietnam; pre-facelift)

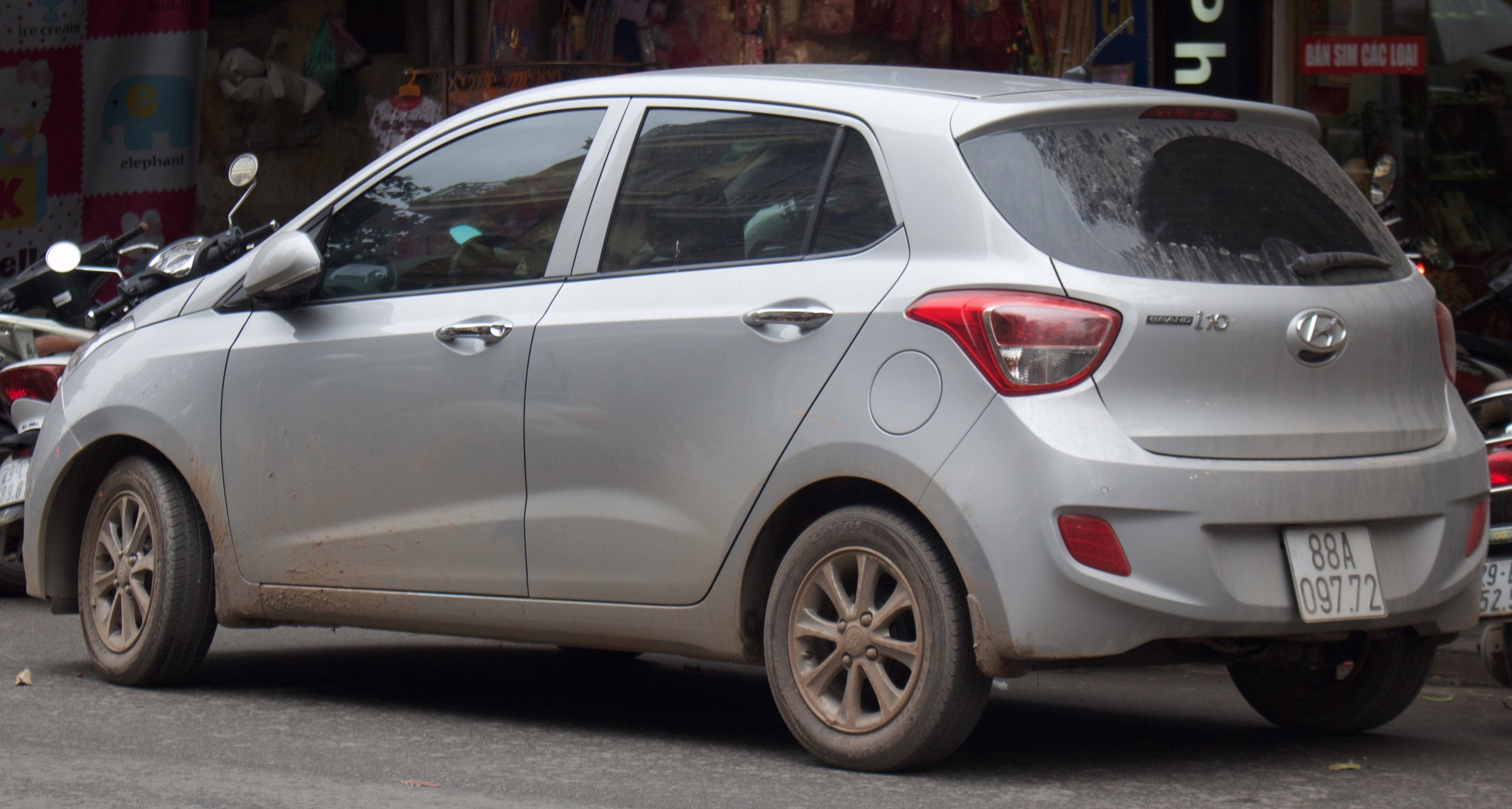
Hyundai Grand i10 (Vietnam; pre-facelift)

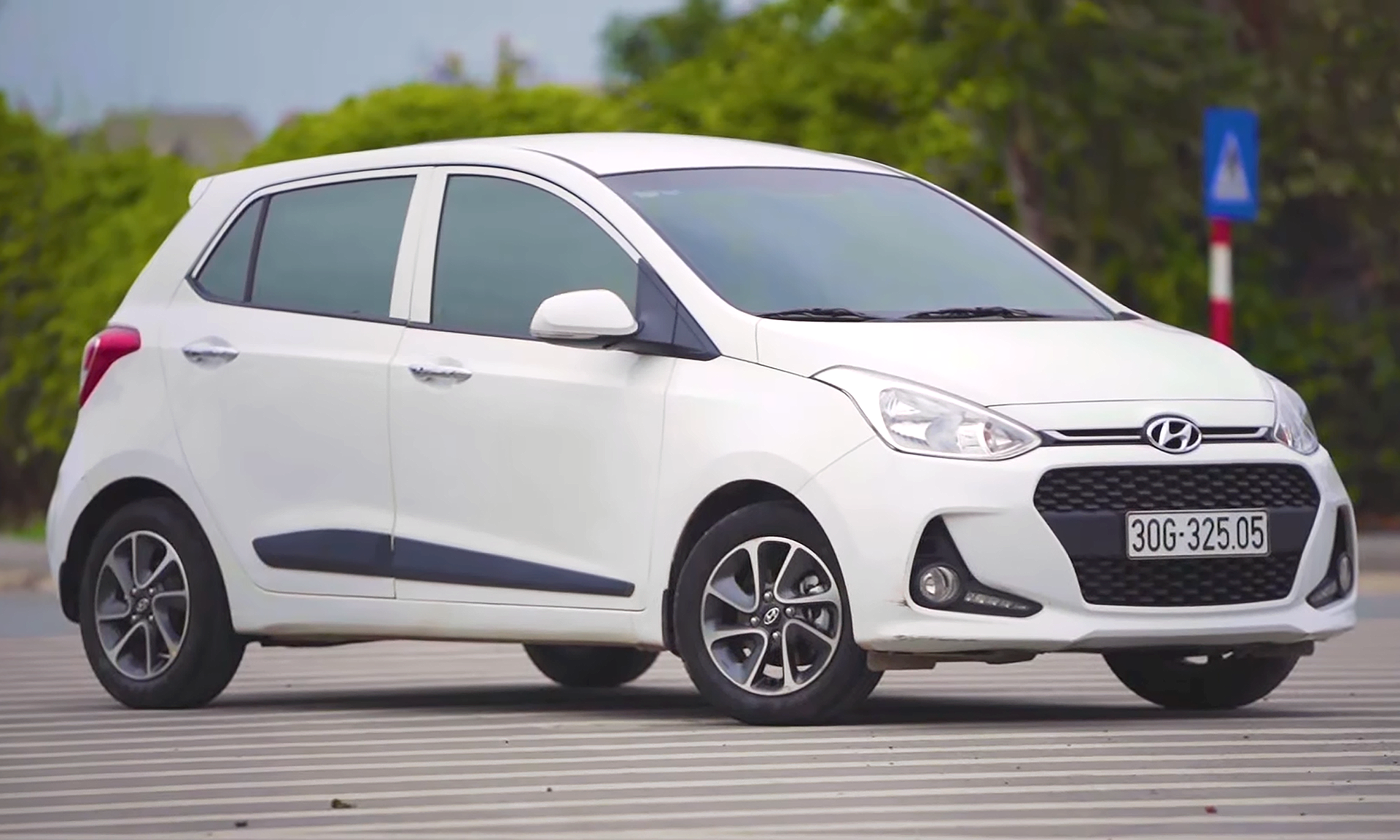
2020 Hyundai Grand i10 (Vietnam; facelift)

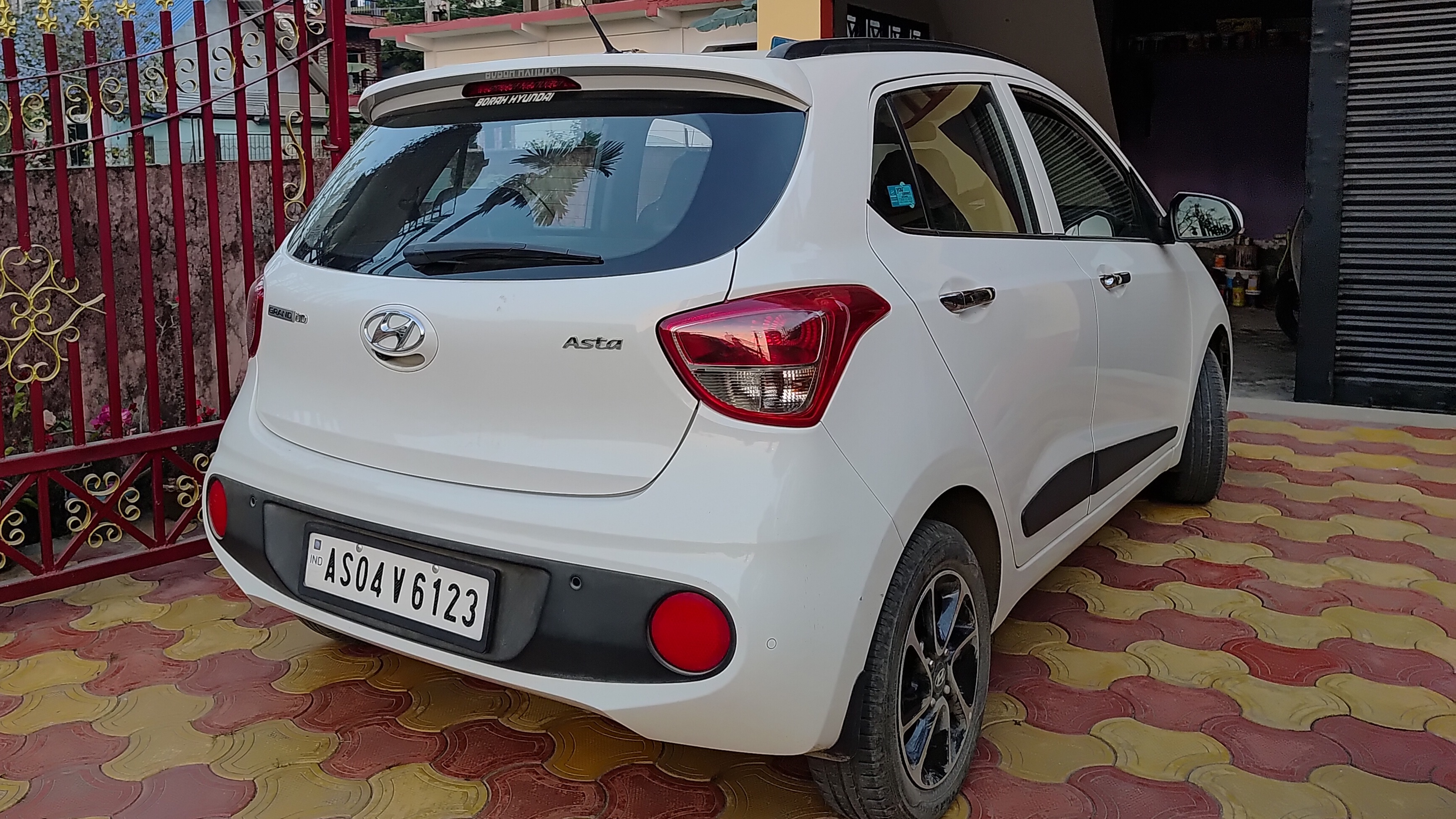
2018 Hyundai Grand i10 Asta Automatic 1.2 (India; Facelift)

==== Grand i10X ====
Introduced in 2015 and sold exclusively in Indonesia, the Grand i10X is a crossover-inspired variant of the Grand i10, featuring different front and rear bumpers and black plastic panels for the fender flares, door panels, rocker panels, and two-tone 14-inch alloy wheels.

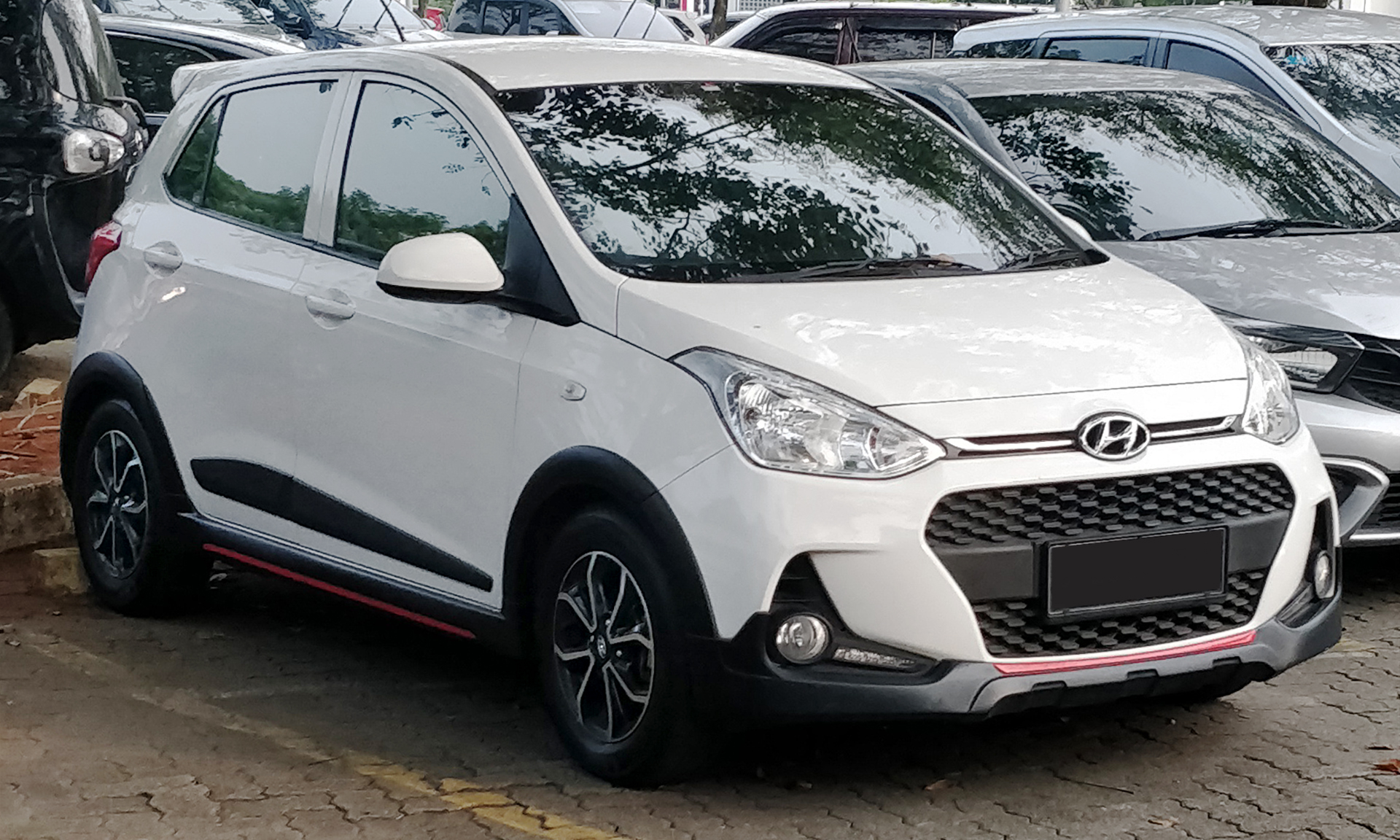
Hyundai Grand i10X (Indonesia; facelift)

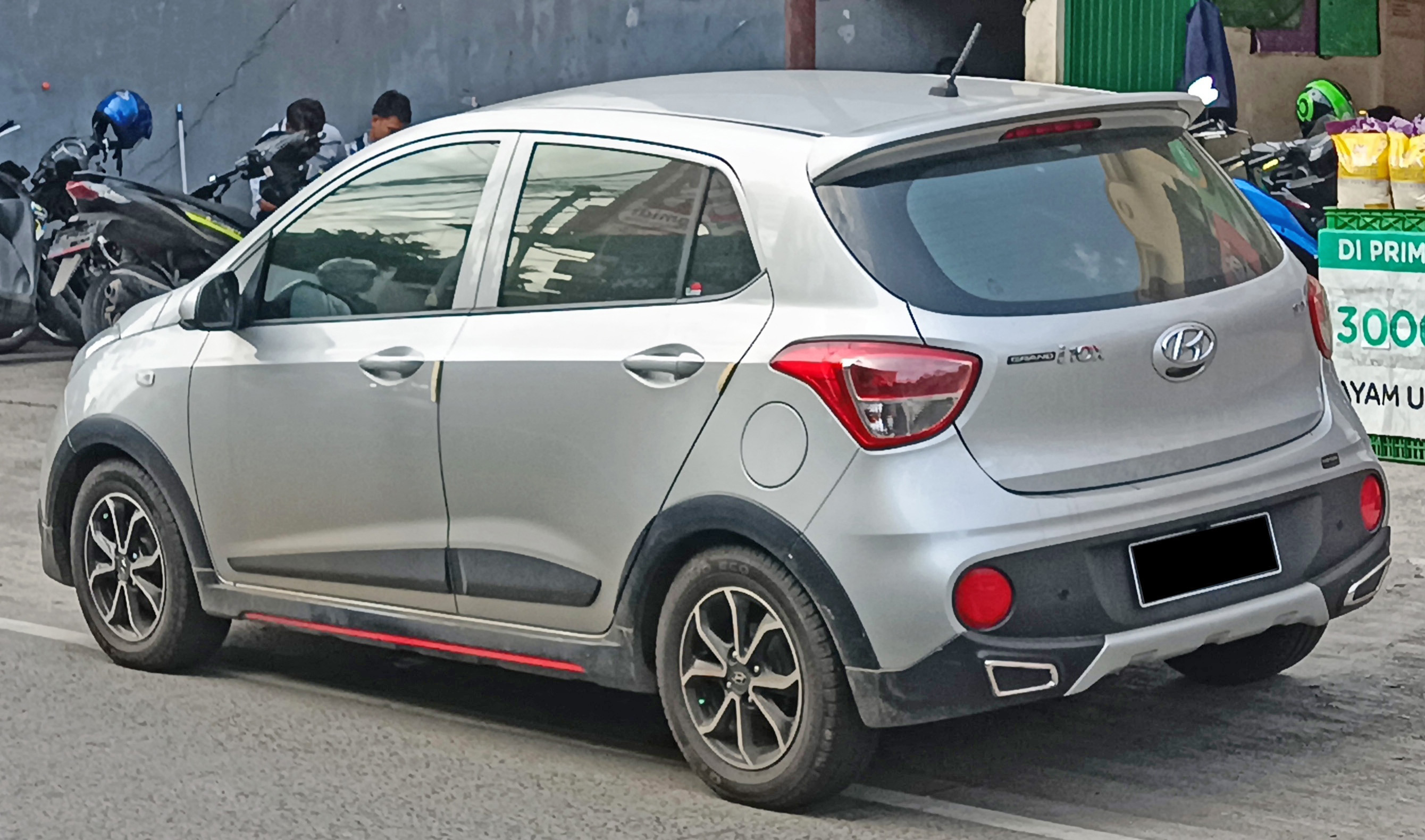
Hyundai Grand i10X (Indonesia; facelift)

=== Xcent/Grand i10 sedan ===
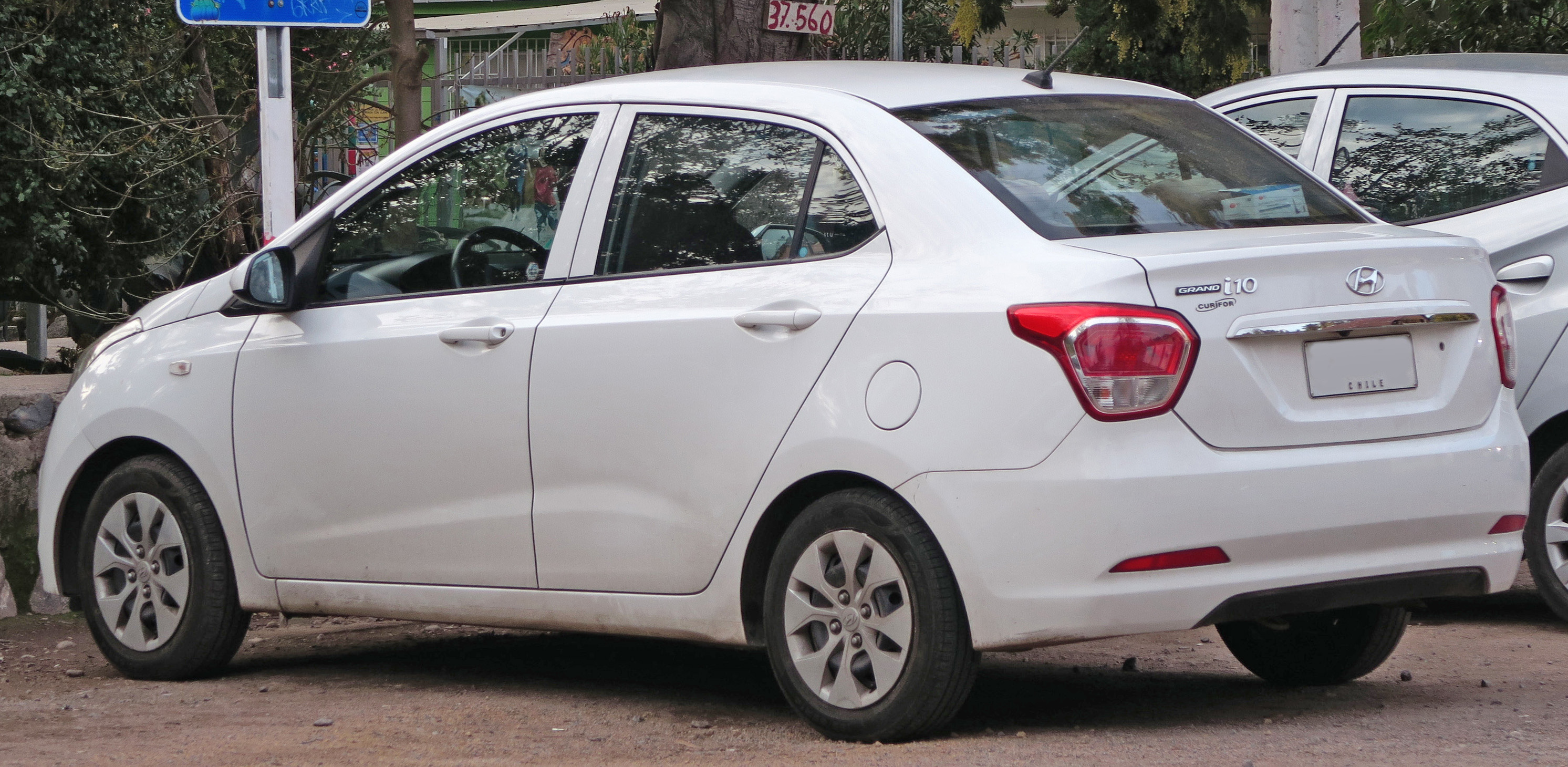
Hyundai Grand i10 sedan

Prior to the official unveiling of the Grand i10, Hyundai Motor India revealed that a sedan variant will be launched in 2014. The new sedan, called the Xcent, was revealed in February 2014. It is designed to fit in the popular sub-4 metre sedan segment in India which emerged after the government imposed heavier tax for cars longer than 4,000 mm (157.5 in) in length. It is exported to numerous emerging countries as the Grand i10 sedan.

=== Reception ===
The European i10 was met with very positive reviews. John McIlroy of What Car? magazine gave the car a five-star rating, commenting that it "represents a major step forward over its predecessor – to the point where it's an extremely tempting alternative to a VW Up, and not just on price." Piers Ward of Top Gear gave the i10 a score of 8 out of 10, with his verdict being: "Yet another quality car from the Koreans. Cheap price, good design and with minimal compromise."

Matt Burt of Autocar gave it four and a half out of five stars, calling it "one of the most accomplished and well-rounded offerings in the city car segment, and has road manners that would embarrass a few much larger (and more expensive) vehicles."

Andrew English of The Daily Telegraph also gave the car four out of five stars, describing it as "Clever and quite a nice little car. Reasonable comfort, ride, handling and well put together, though not the most economical. It's certainly the best car Hyundai makes and wouldn't be disgraced as the family's main transport."

In India, the Grand i10 was awarded the 2014 Golden Steering Wheel in the hatchback category. It was also awarded "Car of the Year" and "Entry Hatchback of the Year" at the 2014 NDTV Car and Bike Awards. In the Philippines, the Grand i10 was awarded Best Mini Car of the Year by the Car Awards Group for 2014–2015.

=== Powertrain ===
Specs
Model	Year	Transmission	Power	Torque	0–100 km/h (0-62 mph) (Official)	Top Speed (Official)
i10
Petrol
1.0L Kappa LPi	2013–2019	5–speed manual	67 PS (49 kW; 66 hp) @ 6,200 rpm	9.2 kg⋅m (90 N⋅m; 67 lbf⋅ft) @ 3,500 rpm	15.0s	153 km/h (95 mph)
1.0L Kappa MPi	2013–2019	5–speed manual 4-speed automatic	66 PS (49 kW; 65 hp) @ 5,500 rpm	9.7 kg⋅m (95 N⋅m; 70 lbf⋅ft) @ 3,500 rpm	14.9s (Manual 4-seater); 14.7s (Manual 5-seater); 16.8s (Automatic)	155 km/h (96 mph) (Manual 4-seater); 156 km/h (97 mph) (Manual 5-seater); 150 km/h (93 mph) (Automatic)
1.25L Kappa MPi	2013–2019	5–speed manual 4-speed automatic	87 PS (64 kW; 86 hp) @ 6,000 rpm	12.3 kg⋅m (121 N⋅m; 89 lbf⋅ft) @ 4,000 rpm	12.1s (Manual); 13.8s (Automatic)	175 km/h (109 mph)
Grand i10
Petrol
1.2L Kappa MPi	2013–2019	5–speed manual 4-speed automatic	83 PS (61 kW; 82 hp) @ 6,000 rpm	11.6 kg⋅m (114 N⋅m; 84 lbf⋅ft) @ 4,000 rpm	12.9s (Manual); 14.8s (Automatic)	167 km/h (104 mph) (Manual); 158 km/h (98 mph) (Automatic)
Diesel
1.1L U2 CRDi	2013–2019	5–speed manual	71 PS (52 kW; 70 hp) @ 4,000 rpm	16.3 kg⋅m (160 N⋅m; 118 lbf⋅ft) @ 1,500–2,750 rpm	15.6s	161 km/h (100 mph)

=== Safety ===
Global NCAP awarded the Indian market version with no airbags and no ABS 0 stars in 2014.

Latin NCAP awarded the Indian-made i10 in its most basic Latin American market configuration with no airbags and no ABS 0 stars in 2015.

Latin NCAP 2.0 test results Hyundai Grand i10 - NO Airbags (2016, based on Euro NCAP 2008)
Test	Points	Stars
Adult occupant:	0.00/34.0	0 /5 stars
Child occupant:	20.81/49.00	2 /5 stars

Euro NCAP 2014 test results (similar to Latin NCAP 2020) for a LHD, five door hatchback European market variant on a registration of 2014:

Test	Score
Overall:	4/5 stars
Adult occupant:	79%
Child occupant:	80%
Pedestrian:	71%
Safety assist:	56%

ASEAN NCAP test results Hyundai i10 (2015)
Test	Points	Stars
Adult occupant:	4.40	1 /5 stars
Child occupant:	79%	4 /5 stars
Safety assist:	NA	

Electronic Stability Control (ESC) is standard on all European models.

== Third generation (AC3/AI3; 2019) ==
Third generation
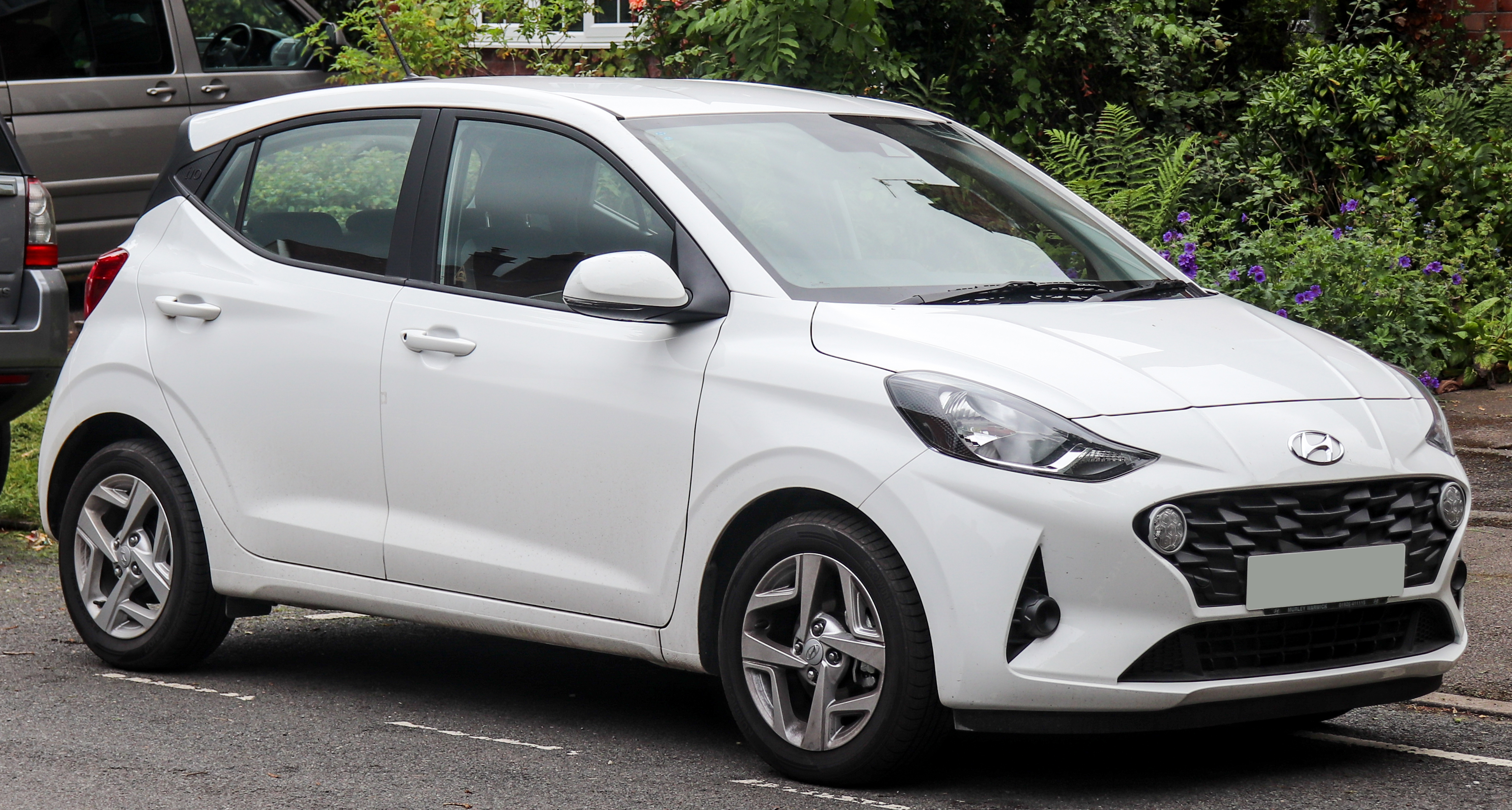
- 2022 Hyundai i10 SE

Overview
- Model code: AC3; AI3 (Grand i10)
- Also called: Hyundai Grand i10 (AI3); Hyundai Grand i10 Nios (India, AI3 hatchback); Hyundai Aura (India, sedan); Hyundai Prime HB (India, fleet)
- Production: 2019–present (AI3); 2020–2026 (AC3)
- Assembly: Turkey: Izmit (HAOS, AC3); India: Chennai (HMIL, AI3); Vietnam: Ninh Bình (HTMV, AI3); Sri Lanka: Colombo (Abans, AI3)
- Designer: Sungno Kim & Hyeryun Sohn (Exterior); Youngwook Kang (Interior)

Body and chassis
- Body style: 5-door hatchback 4-door sedan
- Platform: Hyundai-Kia BA/K1
- Related: Kia Picanto (JA) (AC3); Hyundai Santro (AH2); Hyundai Exter (AI3)

Powertrain
- Engine: Petrol: 1.0 L Kappa II MPI I3; 1.0 L Kappa II T-GDI I3; 1.0 L Smartstream G1.0 MPI I3; 1.0 L Smartstream G1.0 T-GDI I3; 1.2 L Kappa II MPI I4; Diesel: 1.2 L U II CRDI I3
- Transmission: 5-speed manual; 5-speed AMT; 4-speed automatic (AI3, except India)

Dimensions
- Wheelbase: AC3: 2,425 mm (95.5 in); AI3: 2,450 mm (96.5 in)
- Length: AC3: 3,670–3,675 mm (144.5–144.7 in); AI3: 3,815 mm (150.2 in)
- Width: 1,680 mm (66.1 in)
- Height: AC3: 1,480–1,483 mm (58.3–58.4 in); AI3: 1,520 mm (59.8 in)
- Curb weight: 921–1,045 kg (2,030–2,304 lb)

The third-generation model debuted in India as the Grand i10 Nios on 7 August 2019. The Grand i10 Nios, codenamed AI3, is longer than the previous-generation Grand i10 by 160 mm (6.3 in), or 40 mm (1.6 in).

The European i10 (codename: AC3) was revealed a month after the Indian model, just ahead of the Frankfurt Motor Show in September 2019. This model has been designed, developed and built in Europe. The roof has also been lowered by 20 mm (0.8 in) and the width has been increased by 20 mm (0.8 in). It is powered by a 1.0-litre T-GDi petrol engine, in addition to the 1.2-litre MPi. Both the engines get Idle Stop and Go (ISG) as standard, which helps improve fuel economy and reduce CO_{2} emissions. The i10 N Line was also unveiled with a sportier exterior design.

The Euro-spec i10 production started at Hyundai Assan Otomotiv in January 2020, until January 2026.

Rear view

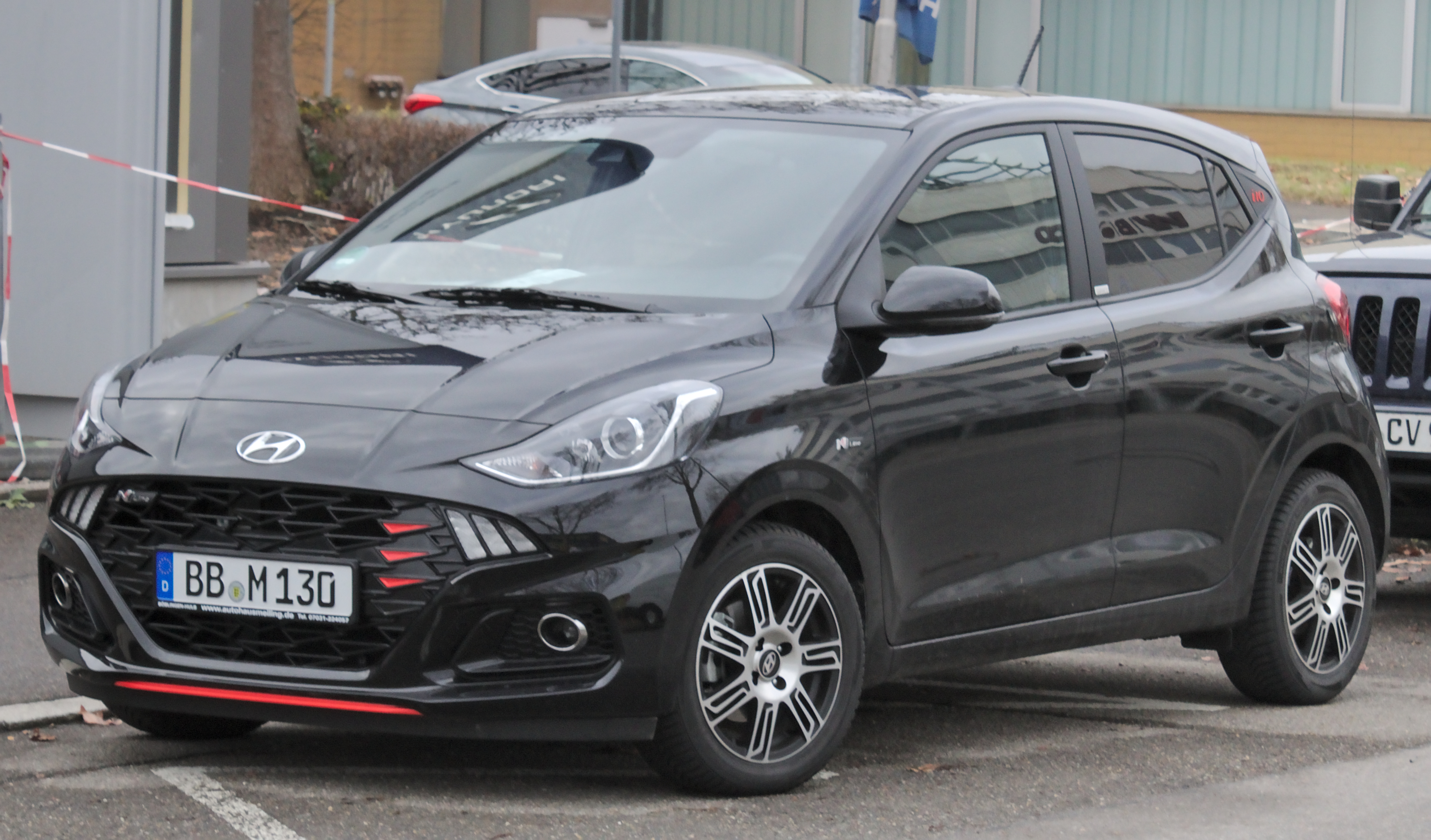
Hyundai i10 N-Line (AC3)

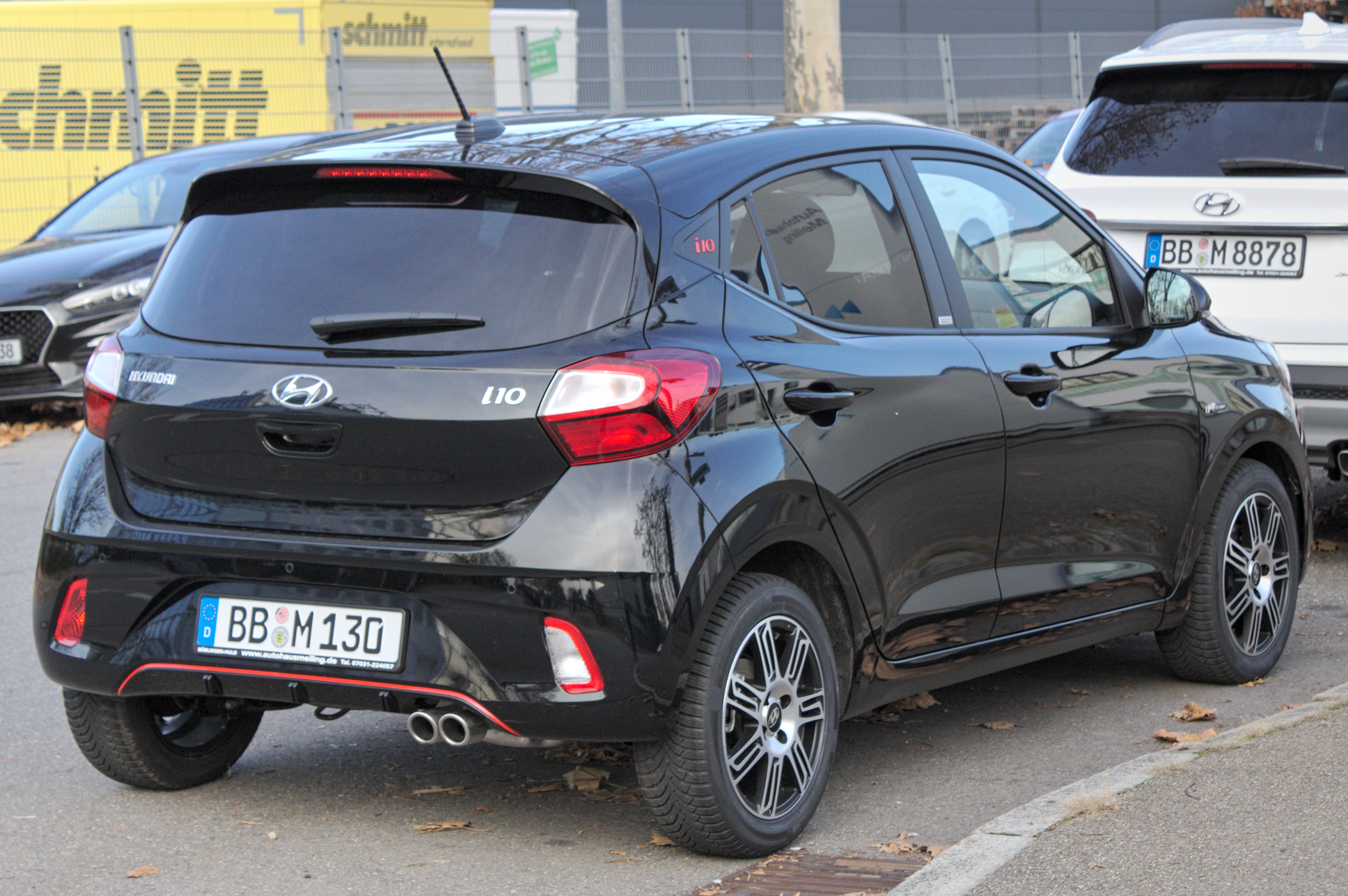
Hyundai i10 N-Line (AC3)

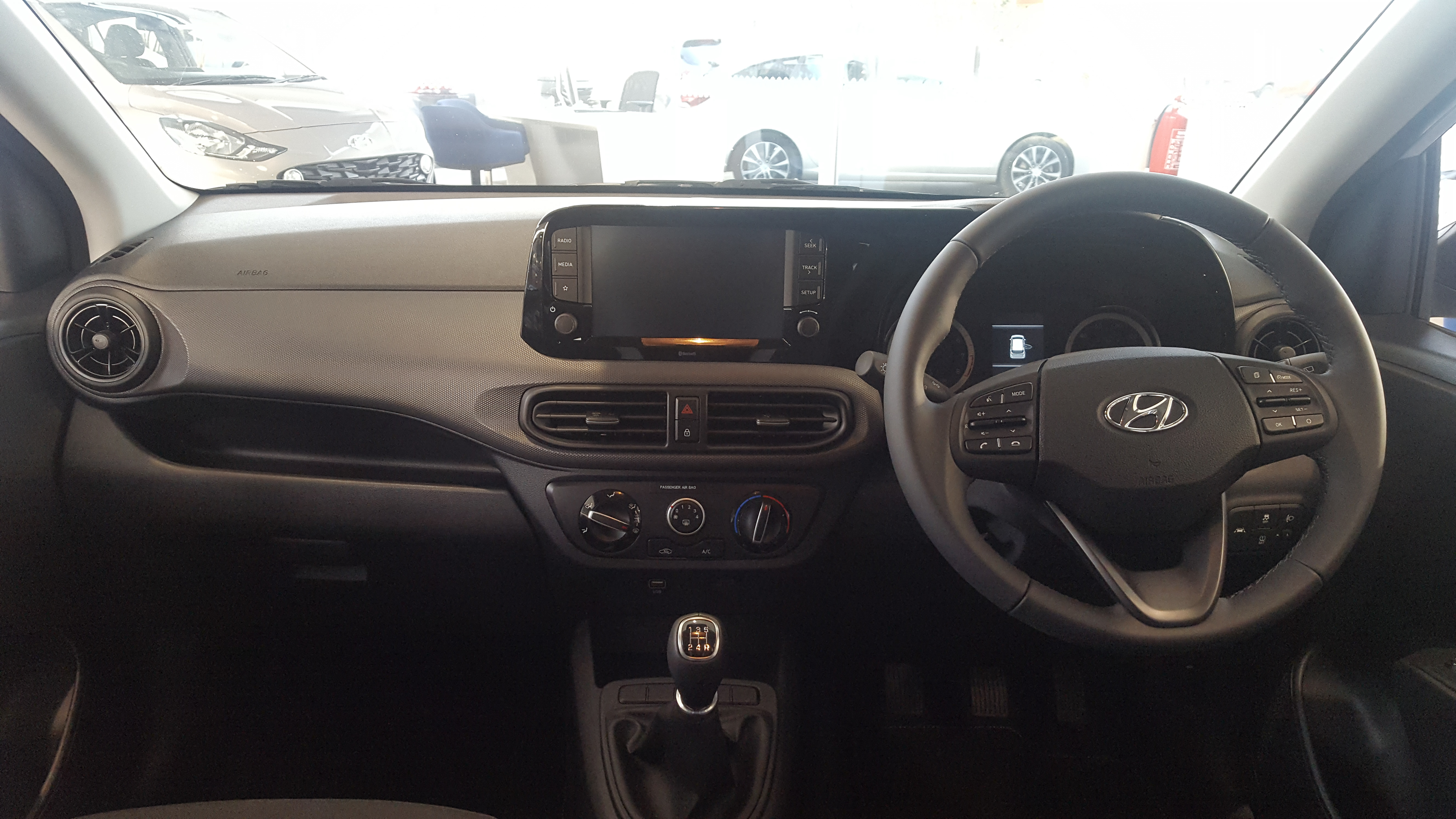
Interior (AC3)

=== Facelift ===
A facelift was unveiled on 27 February 2023.

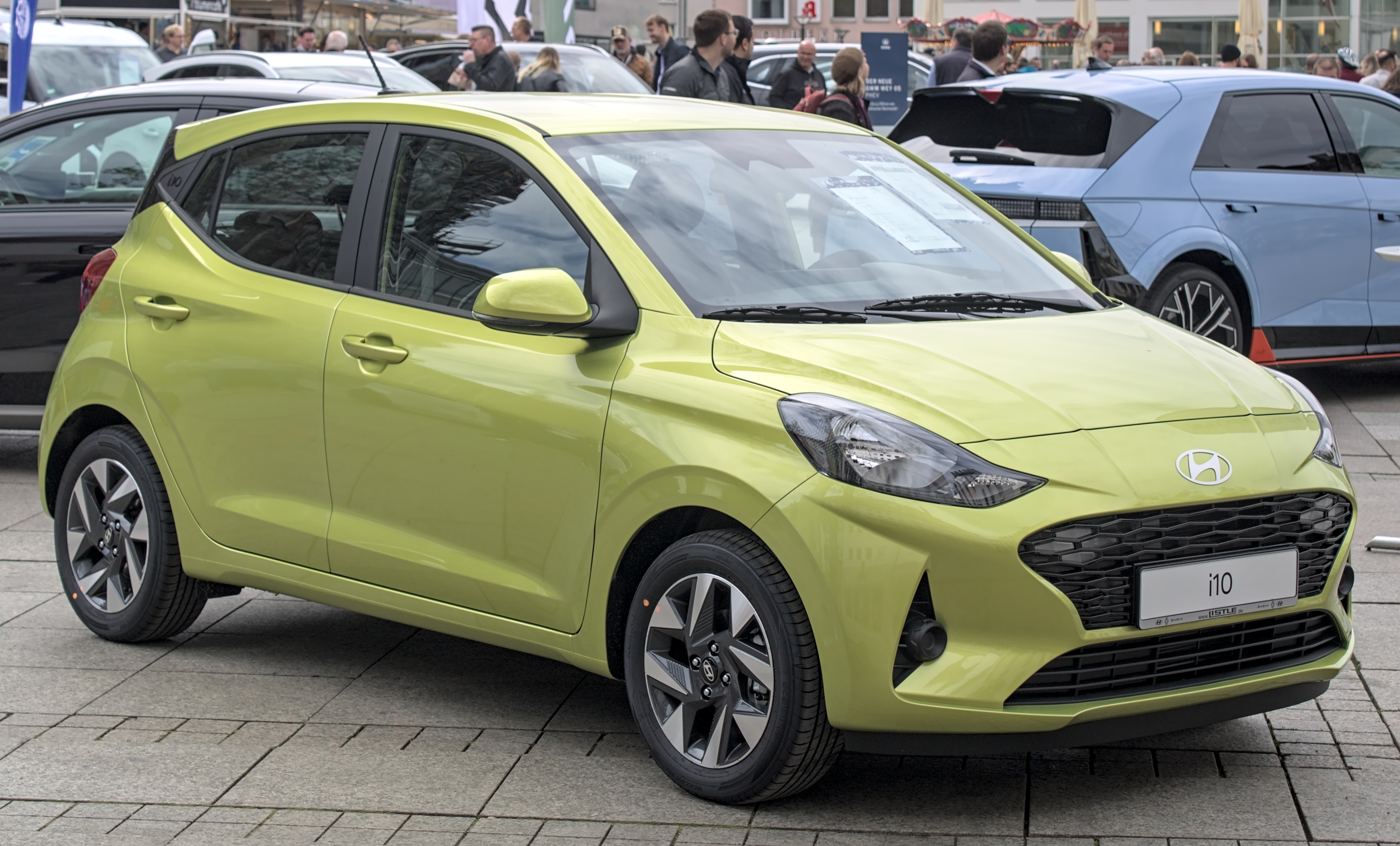
2023 i10 (front view, facelift)

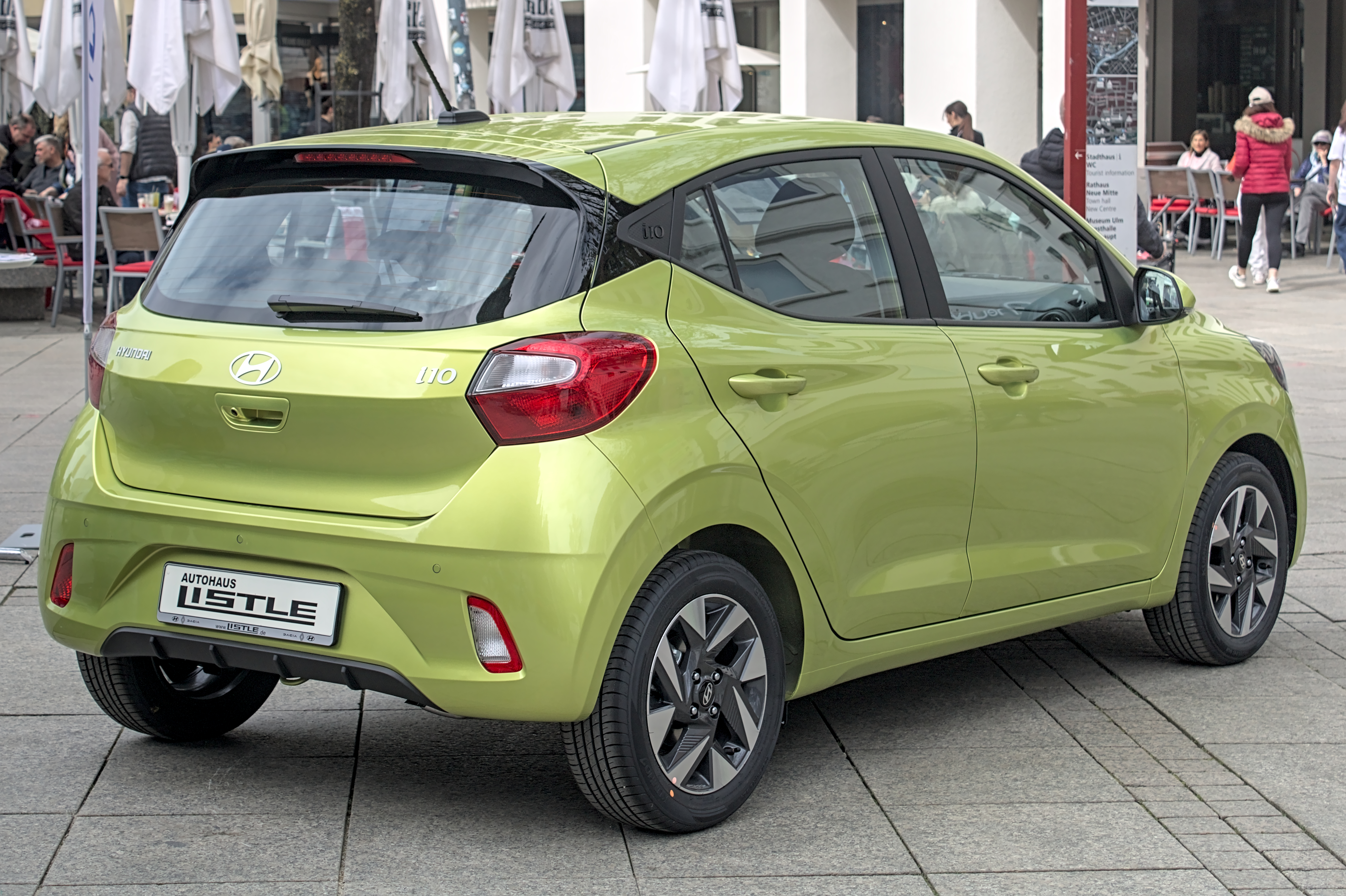
2023 i10 (rear view, facelift)

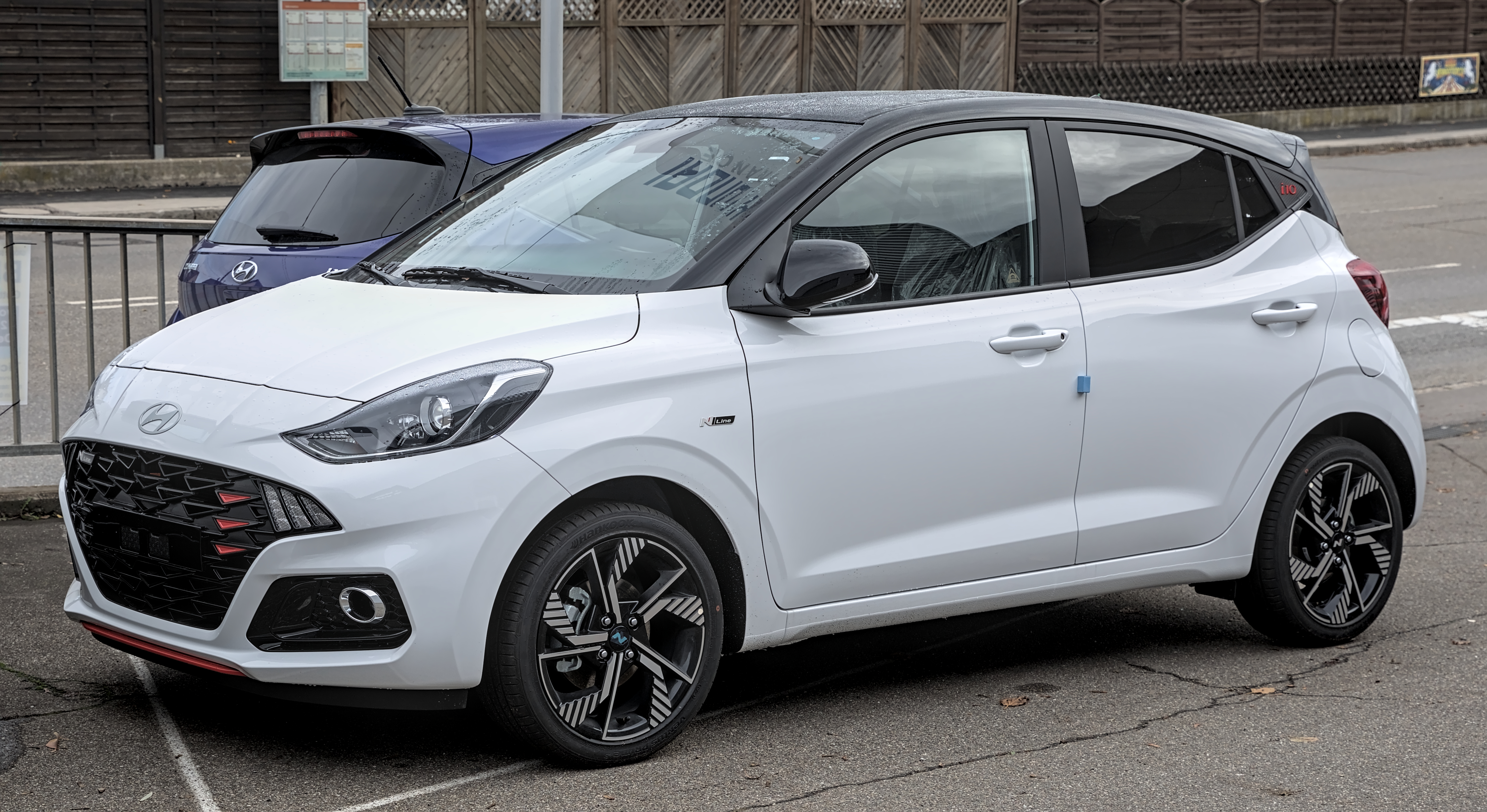
2023 i10 N Line (front view, facelift)

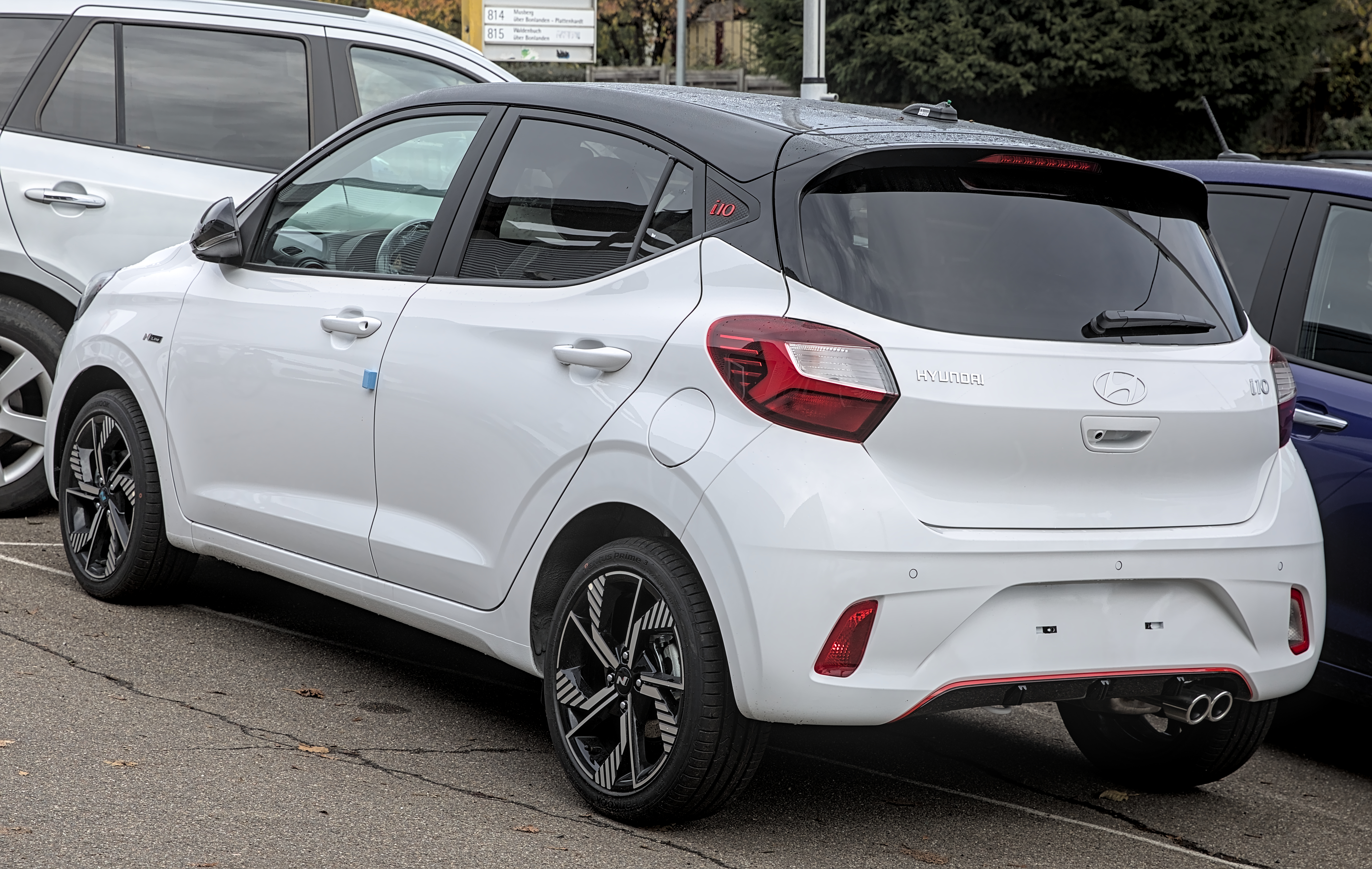
2023 i10 N Line (rear view, facelift)

=== Grand i10 (AI3) ===
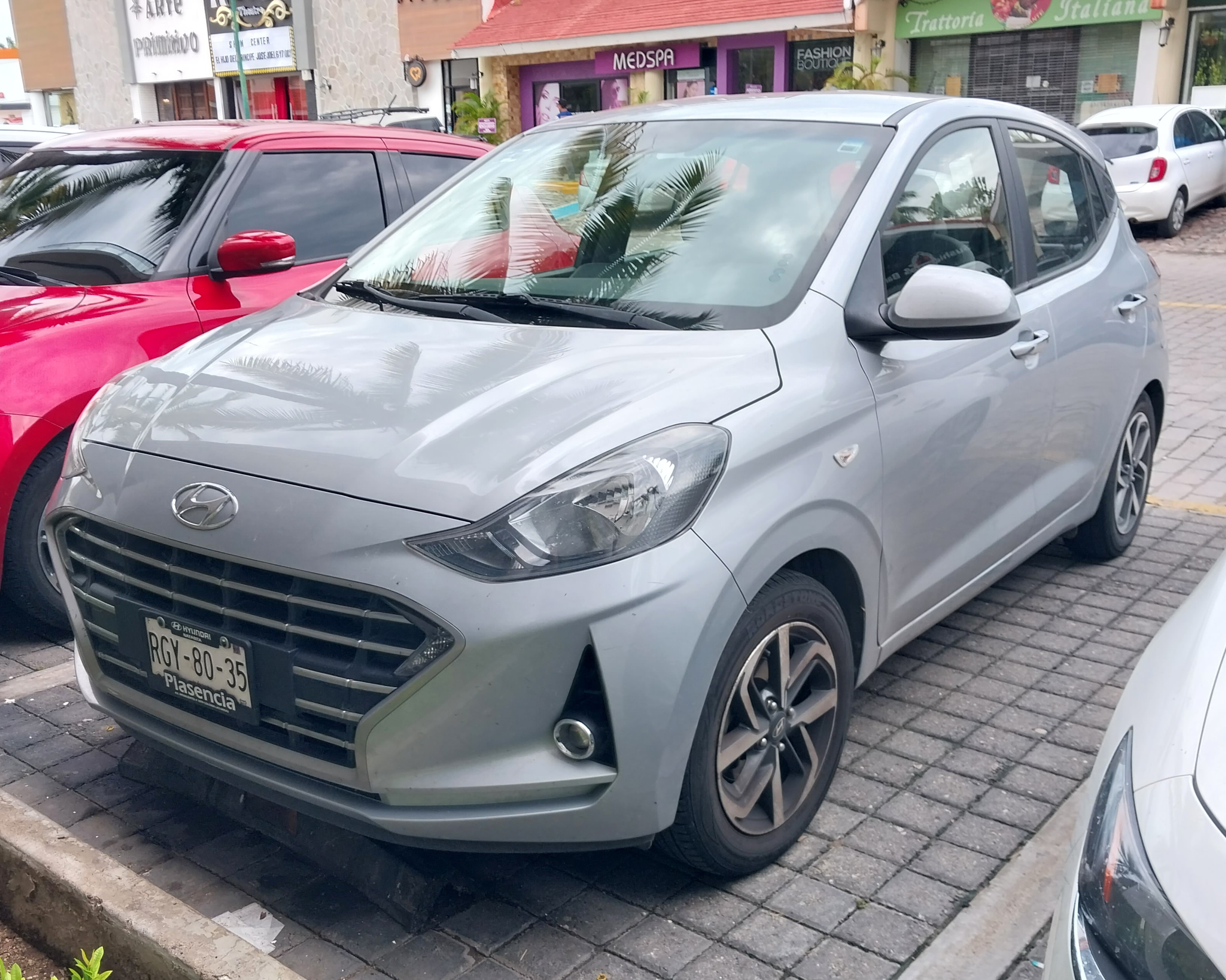

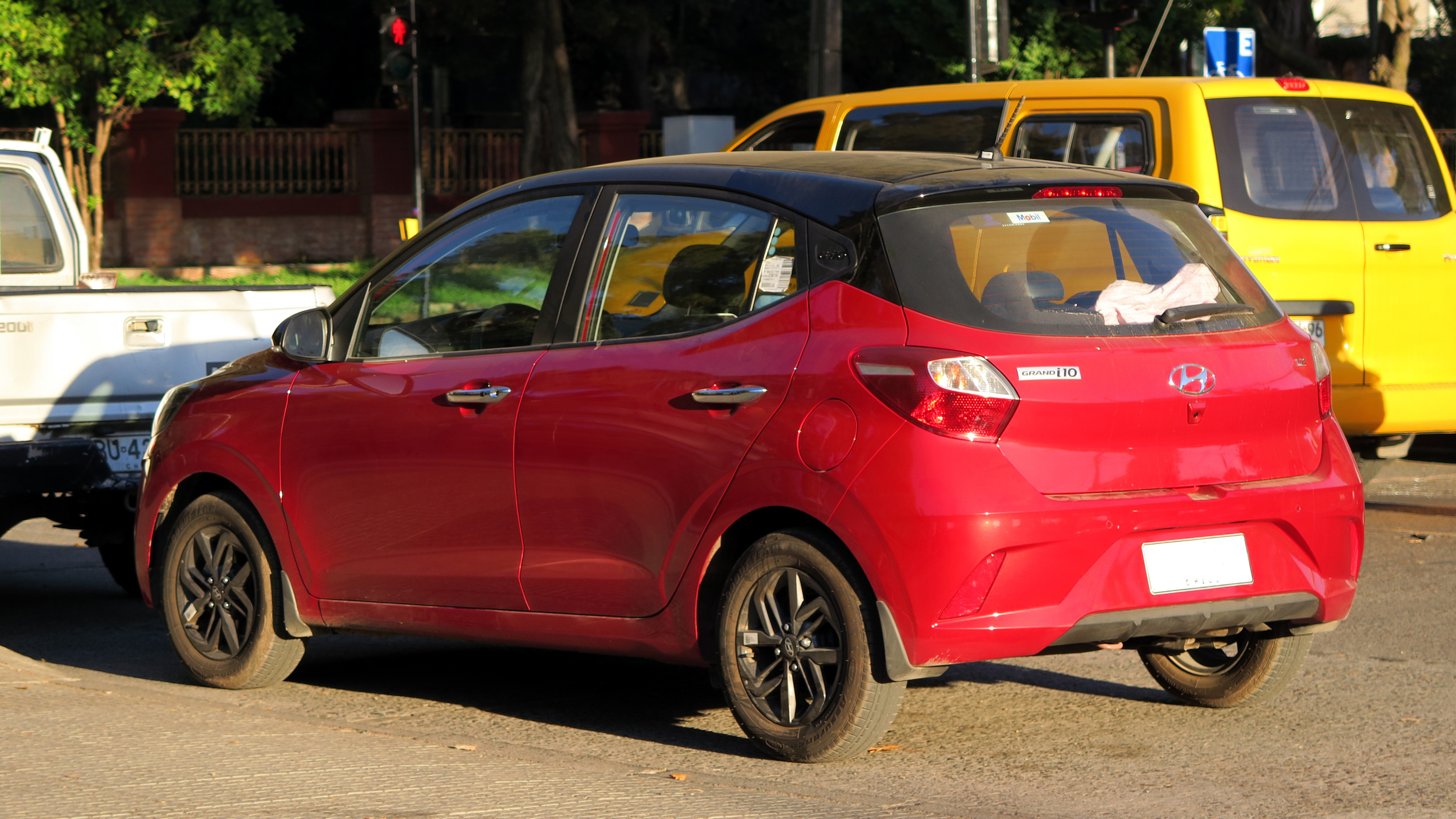
Pre-facelift Grand i10

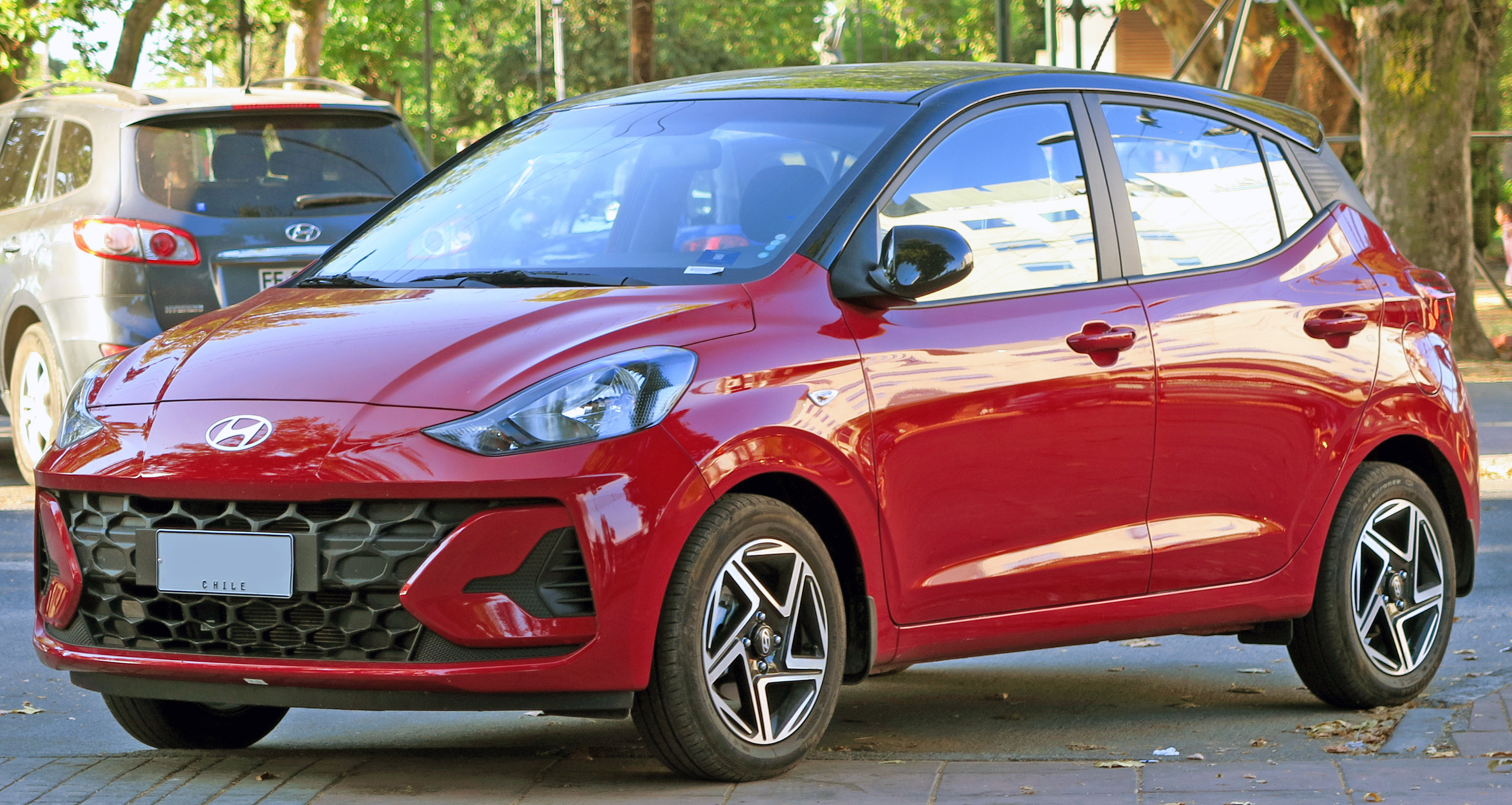
Facelift Grand i10

==== India ====
The third-generation i10, marketed as the Grand i10 Nios was launched on 20 August 2019 in India and offered in 10 variants across petrol and diesel engines as well as manual and automatic transmissions. As it is the case with the second-generation model, it is also larger than the European model. This model is 135 mm (5.3 in) longer than the Euro-spec AC3 i10, with its wheelbase extended by 25 mm (1.0 in). It is available with an eight-inch infotainment system, keyless entry with engine start/stop, 5.3-inch MID, and Arkamys sound system.

The Grand i10 Nios is available with a 1.2-litre naturally aspirated four-cylinder petrol engine and a 1.0-litre turbocharged three-cylinder petrol engine and a 1.2-litre turbocharged three-cylinder diesel engine. Both the engines come with a common 5-speed manual and 5-speed automated manual transmission choices.

===== Facelift =====
The facelift was launched on 20 January 2023, it features a redesigned front fascia and new tail lights.

By May 2024, cumulative sales of the model reached 3 million units in the country.

==== Vietnam ====
The AI3 Grand i10 was introduced in Vietnam in August 2021 in both hatchback and sedan models.

==== Mexico ====
The Grand i10 was launched in Mexico on 16 July 2020 in hatchback and sedan models. Imported from India, it is offered in four trim levels: GL, GL Mid, GLS, and NS (hatchback only) and offered in automatic and manual transmissions. It is only available with a 1.2 litre engine.

==== South Africa ====
Hyundai's new-generation Grand i10 hatchback has been launched in South Africa during October 2020. The Grand i10 Cargo has been renewed a few months later.

In July 2024, Hyundai tweaked its facelifted Hyundai Grand i10 range, which now features a trimmed line-up and renamed trim grades. Hyundai cut the starting prices and also changed the naming convention from Motion and Fluid trim grades to Premium and Executive. Hyundai has also trimmed the line-up from eight to six derivatives.

Inside, all facelifted Grand i10 variants have black cloth-and-vinyl upholstery with red accents, a height-adjustable driver’s seat and tilt-adjustable steering column, a multifunction steering wheel, manual aircon, electric windows all round, an 8-inch touchscreen infotainment system which features Apple CarPlay and Andriod Auto, a Type-C USB fast charger (front), a reverse-view camera and rear air vents.

As before, the entry-level engine for the hatchback (including the Cargo-badged panel van) is a naturally aspirated 1.0-litre, 3-cylinder petrol motor, which generates an unchanged 49 kW (66 hp) and 94 N⋅m (69 lb⋅ft). Drive is sent to the front axle via a 5-speed manual gearbox and the claimed consumption figure is 5.5 L/100 km. Also available only in 4-speed automatic guise, is a more powerful hatchback powered by the slightly punchier 1.2-litre, 4-cylinder petrol engine, which delivers peak outputs of 61 kW (82 hp) and 114 N⋅m (84 lb⋅ft). The claimed consumption figure is 5.9 L/100 km.

Standard safety features across the range include dual front airbags, ABS with EBD and ISOfix child-seat anchors, though stability control is again not present.

==== Safety ====
===== Global NCAP =====
====== India ======
The Indian-spec Grand i10 Nios (AI3) received a two star adult and child occupant rating from the Global NCAP 1.0 (similar to Latin NCAP 2013) in 2020. The car's structure and footwell area were deemed to be incapable of further loading. It is not equipped with three-point seat belts and head restraints for all passengers. It does not offer ESC or side airbags on any variant, but ISOFIX is offered on higher variants.

Global NCAP 1.0 test results (India) 2020 Hyundai i10, RHD (2 airbags) (2020, similar to Latin NCAP 2013)
Test	Score	Stars
Adult occupant protection	7.05/17.00	2 /5 stars
Child occupant protection	15.00/49.00	2 /5 stars

====== South Africa ======
The Grand i10 received 0 stars for adult occupants and 3 stars for toddlers as the first vehicle tested by Global NCAP 3.0 for Africa in December 2025 (based on Latin NCAP 2019).

Global NCAP 2.5 test results (South Africa) 2025 Hyundai Grand i10 (December 2025, similar to Latin NCAP 2019)
Test	Score	Stars
Adult occupant protection	0.0/34.00	0 /5 stars
Child occupant protection	28.57/49.00	3 /5 stars

=== Aura/Grand i10 sedan ===
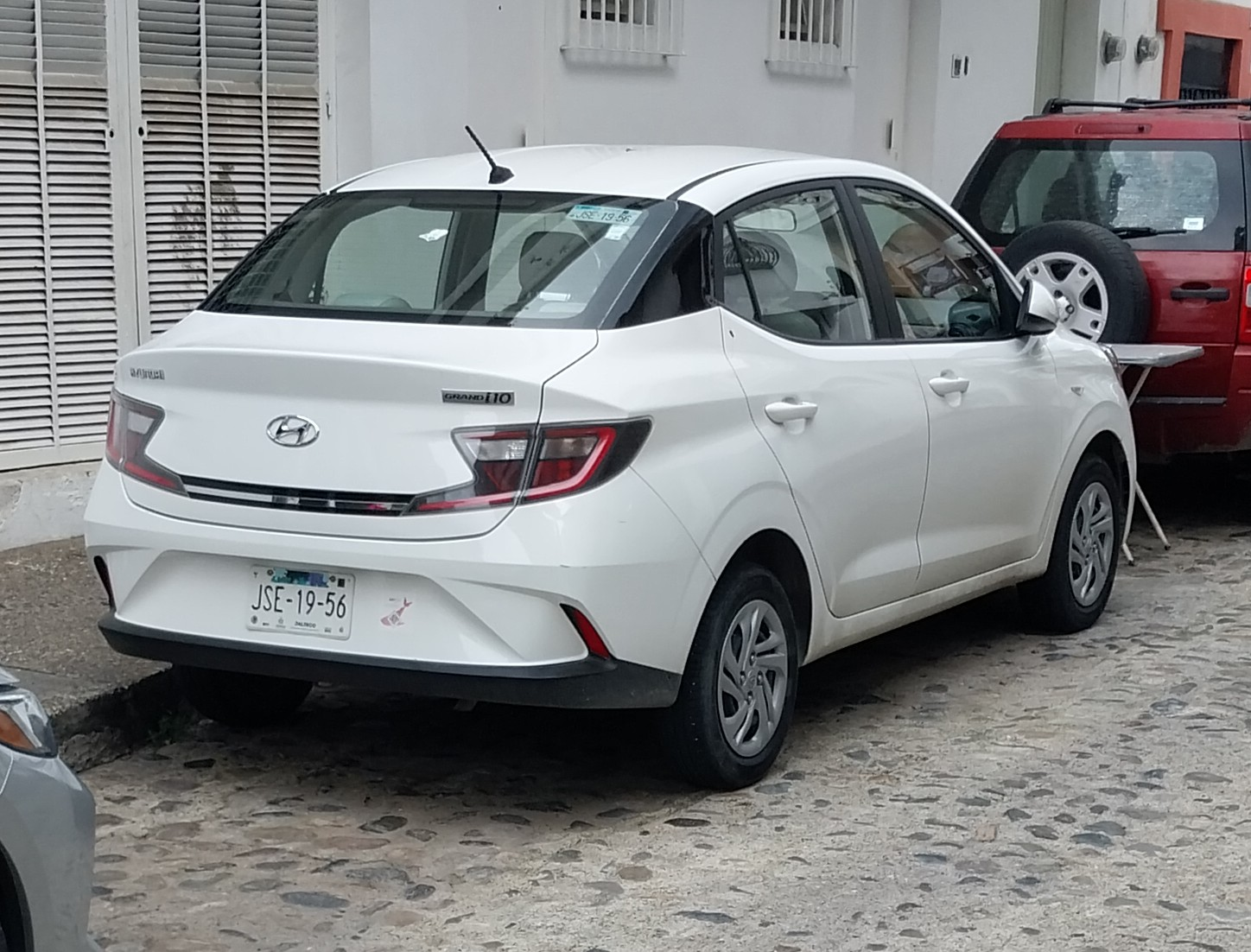
Hyundai Grand i10 sedan

The four-door sedan version was launched as the Hyundai Aura on 21 January 2020 for the Indian market. It is called the Grand i10 Sedan for export markets.

=== Powertrain ===
i10
Model	Year	Transmission	Power	Torque	0–100 km/h (0-62 mph) (Official)	Top Speed (km/h) (Official)
Petrol
1.0L Kappa II MPi	2019–present	5–speed manual 5-speed automated manual	67 PS (49 kW; 66 hp) @ 5,500 rpm	9.8 kg⋅m (96 N⋅m; 71 lbf⋅ft) @ 3,750 rpm	14.6s (Manual); 17.3s (AMT)	156 km/h (97 mph)
1.0L Kappa II T-GDi	2019–present	5–speed manual	100 PS (74 kW; 99 hp) @ 4,500–6,000 rpm	17.5 kg⋅m (172 N⋅m; 127 lbf⋅ft) @ 1,500–4,000 rpm	10.5s	185 km/h (115 mph)
1.2L Kappa II MPi	2019–present	5–speed manual 5-speed automated manual	84 PS (62 kW; 83 hp) @ 6,000 rpm	12 kg⋅m (118 N⋅m; 87 lbf⋅ft) @ 4,200 rpm	12.6s (Manual); 15.8s (AMT)	171 km/h (106 mph)
Diesel
1.2L U II CRDi	2019–2022	5–speed manual 5-speed automated manual	75 PS (55 kW; 74 hp) @ 4,000 rpm	19.4 kg⋅m (190 N⋅m; 140 lbf⋅ft) @ 1,750–2,250 rpm		

=== Safety ===
==== Euro NCAP ====
In contrast to the disastrous rating of the Indian version, the European Hyundai i10 in its standard European market configuration scored 3 stars under the much more stringent Euro NCAP 2020 protocol. Notable differences are the presence of more airbags, ESC and a strengthened structure. However, protection to vulnerable road users was rated at only 52% and the Safety Assistance systems scored 59%. Though AEB, Lane Keep Assist and steering-based driver monitoring are present, Euro NCAP states "The system performed marginally in tests of its detection and reaction to other vehicles".

Euro NCAP scores (2020)
Overall rating	3/5 stars
Adult Occupant	69%
Child Occupant	75%
Vulnerable Road Users	52%
Safety Assist	59%

== Sales ==
Year	Europe	India			Vietnam	Mexico	
Year	Europe	PA	BA	AI3	Vietnam	Sedan	Hatchback
2007	353	14,451					
2008	53,197	104,815					
2009	109,424	137,564					
2010	89,314	159,158					
2011	72,380	138,470					
2012	66,623	98,702					
2013	60,324	77,913	41,861				
2014	80,819	37,207	103,749			394	4,269
2015	86,004	33,240	124,055			7,228	5,578
2016	85,385	19,952	136,187			9,592	5,995
2017	90,603		154,747			6,471	3,799
2018	83,102		134,249			6,146	4,840
2019	78,791		102,693		18,088	8,002	5,056
2020	50,233		91,930		17,767	7,264	4,215
2021	56,074		95,515		11,732	9,427	5,936
2022	44,483			106,222	10,752	7,520	5,759
2023	52,814				7,944	8,046	6,296
2024	58,966				5,831	9,477	10,347

== See also ==
- List of Hyundai vehicles
