= National Print Run Service =

The National Print Run Service (Russian: Национальная тиражная служба) is an independent Moscow-based nonprofit organization oversighting print runs and distribution of periodicals in Russia. The service was established in August 1998 by the Russian Chamber of Commerce and Industry, Union of Journalists of Russia and five other organizations. The National Print Run Service maintains the black list of print run fraudsters (publishers and publications who exaggerate their actual print run figures).
