= National Institute of Ophthalmology =

National Institute of Ophthalmology may refer to:

- National Institute of Ophthalmology, India

== See also ==
- National Institute of Ophthalmic Sciences, Malaysia
