= Exter =

Exter may refer to:

- Exter (Vlotho), a village near Vlotho in Germany
- Exter (Weser), a tributary of the river Weser in Germany
- Exter (surname)
- Extince or Exter-O-naldus or De Exter (born 1967), Dutch language rapper
- Hyundai Exter, a car

== See also ==
- Exter Formation
- Exeter
