= Hyundai Motor India =

South Korean subsidiary in India

Hyundai Motor India Limited
- Type: Public subsidiary
- Traded as: NSE: HYUNDAI; BSE: 544274
- Industry: Automotive
- Founded: 6 May 1996; 30 years ago
- Headquarters: Gurugram, Haryana, India (corporate office) Kancheepuram, Tamil Nadu, India (registered office)
- Key people: Tarun Garg (MD & CEO)
- Products: Automobiles
- Production output: ▲777,876 units (2024)
- Revenue: ▼₹67,654 crore (US$7.0 billion) (2025)
- Operating income: ▼₹7,391 crore (US$770 million) (2025)
- Net income: ▼₹5,492 crore (US$570 million) (2025)
- Total assets: ▲₹29,372 crore (US$3.1 billion) (2025)
- Total equity: ▲₹15,767 crore (US$1.6 billion) (2025)
- Parent: Hyundai Motor Company
- Website: www.hyundai.com/in/en
- Footnotes; Financials as of 31 March 2024.

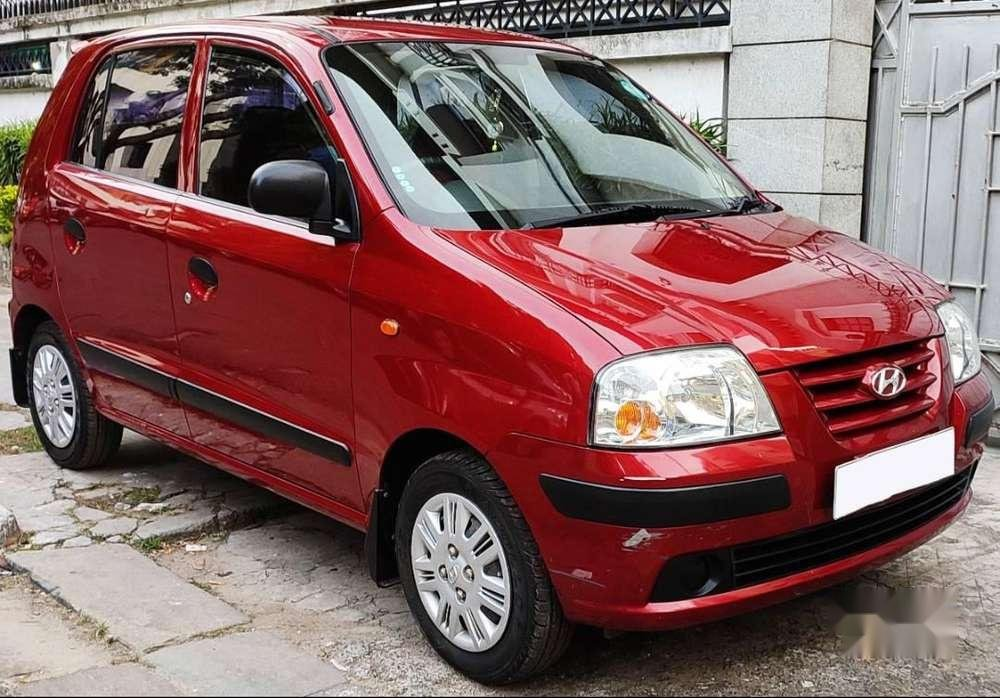
Hyundai Santro Xing (discontinued-2015) was a successful car in India. It was manufactured only by HMIL.

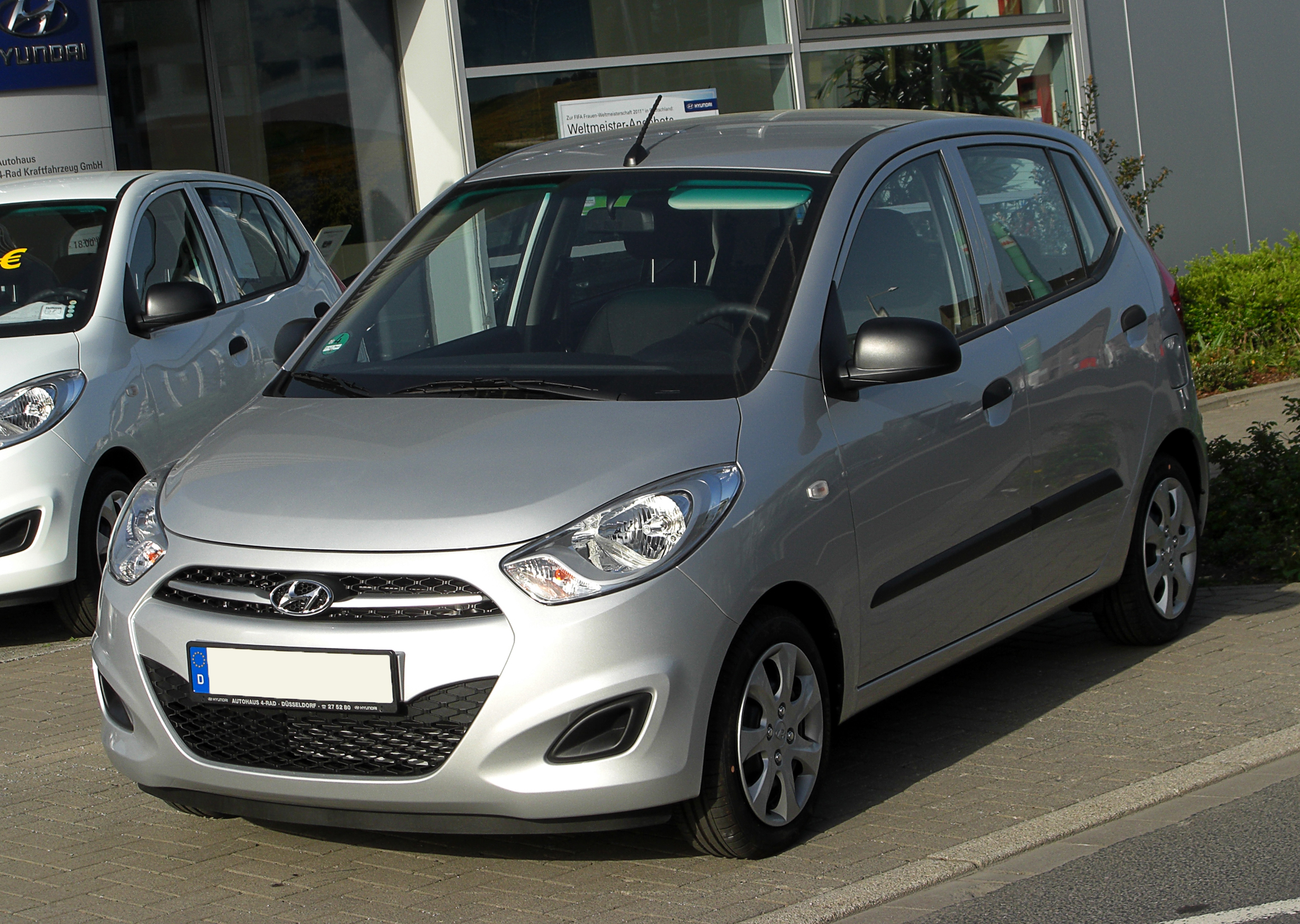
The Hyundai i10 (discontinued-2016) was exclusively manufactured by HMIL.

Hyundai Motor India Limited (HMIL) is the Indian subsidiary of the South Korean automobile manufacturer Hyundai Motor Company. It is the second largest car manufacturer in India by sales until 2025.

== History ==
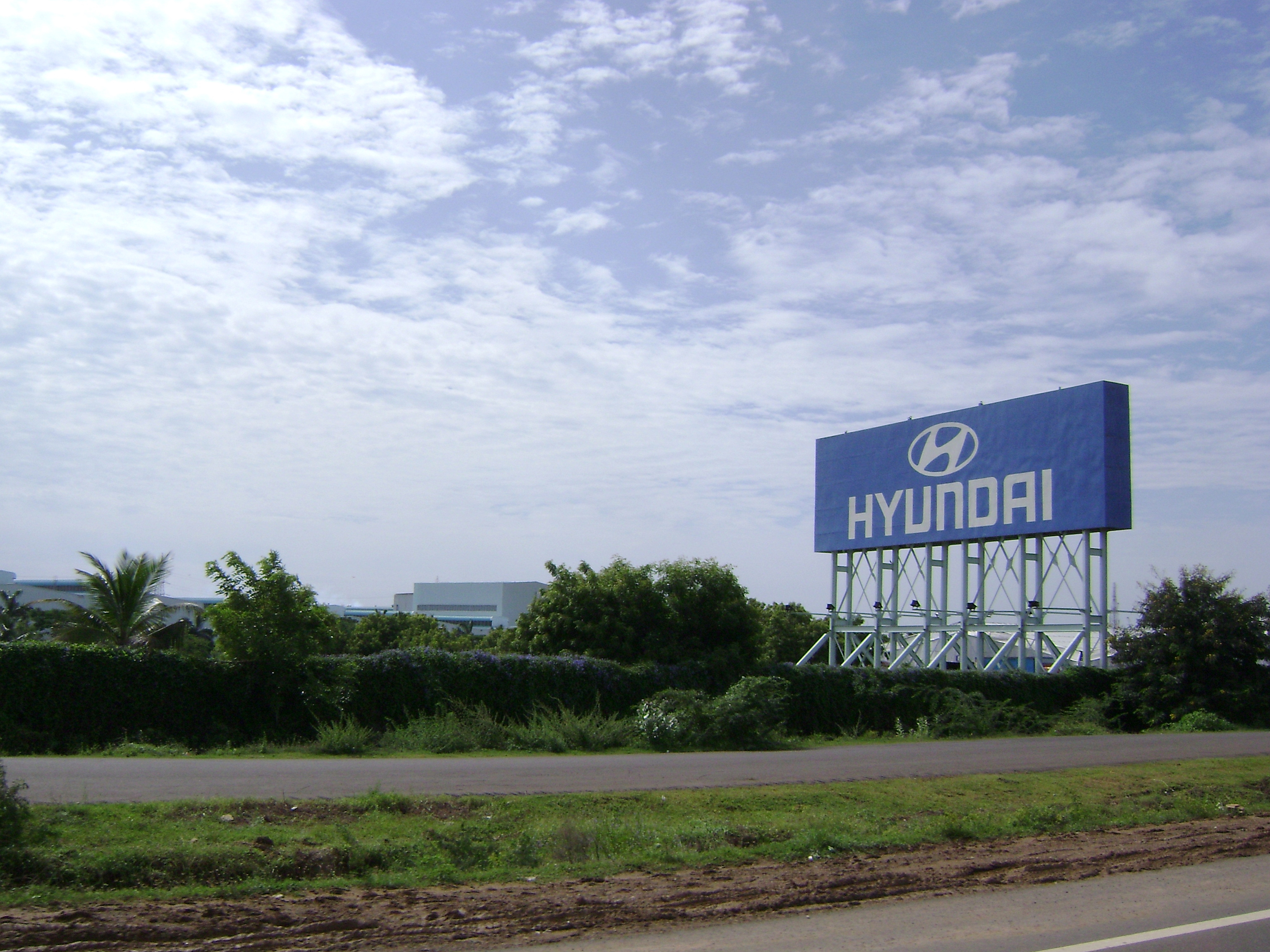
Hyundai's manufacturing plant near Chennai.

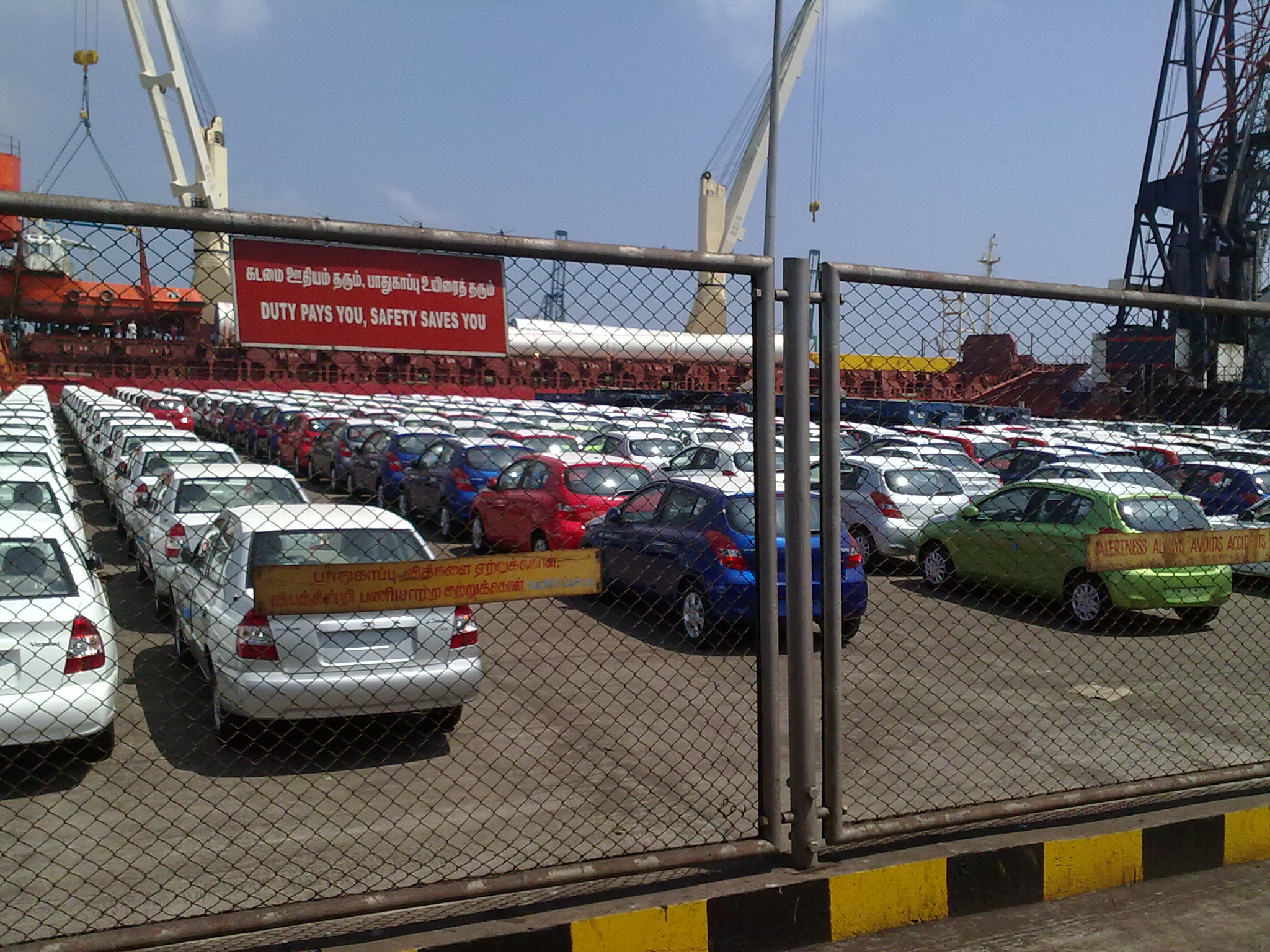
Hyundai Cars at a port.

In the early 1990s, the Indian automobile market had only five major automobile manufacturers: Maruti Suzuki, Tata and Mahindra, Hindustan, Premier. Maruti Suzuki had a near monopoly over the passenger cars segment. Tata and Mahindra were solely utility and commercial vehicle manufacturers, while Hindustan and Premier both built outdated and uncompetitive products. Daewoo had entered the Indian automobile market with Cielo just three years back, while Ford, Opel and Honda had entered less than a year back.

Hyundai Motor India Limited was formed on 6 May 1996 as a wholly owned subsidiary of Hyundai Motor Company of South Korea. Its first manufacturing plant was constructed in Irungattukottai near Chennai, Tamil Nadu. Its first car, the Hyundai Santro, was launched on 23 September 1998 and was a runaway success. Within a few months of its inception, HMIL became India's second-largest automobile manufacturer and the largest automobile exporter.

Mr Yang Soo Kim was then the managing director of Hyundai Motor India. The Indian counterpart leadership team was managed by Mr AP Gandhi, Mr BVR Subbu and Mr G.S. Ramesh. Mr AP Gandhi was the president for a few years of inception. Mr BVR Subbu was the marketing director responsible for dealer development and sales. He resigned from Hyundai Motor India in 2006.

HMC has set up a research and development facility (Hyundai Motor India Engineering – HMIE) in the cyber city of Hyderabad.

As HMC's global export hub for compact cars, HMIL became the first automotive company in India to achieve the export of 10 lakh cars in just over a decade. HMIL currently exports cars to more than 87 countries.

In July 2012, Arvind Saxena, the Director of Marketing and Sales stepped down from the position after serving the company for seven years.

In August 2018, Rakesh Srivastava, Director of Sales and Marketing at Hyundai India, resigned from his position after serving for six years.

On 4 December 2018, Hyundai Motor India Ltd, announced the top-level management changes immediately. Seon Seob Kim assumed the responsibilities of MD and CEO from Young Key Koo.

In 2019, Hyundai Motor Company invested around 1.1 trillion KRW in an additional EV production line and began manufacturing Kona Electric.

In 2022, Hyundai Motor India Limited receives about 85% of its electrical power as eco-friendly energy from external power plants. Moreover, it is currently installing a stationary solar power system of 1.9MWp using the module factory's roof with a size of 13,028m².

On 15 June 2024, Hyundai Motor India filed a draft prospectus with the Securities and Exchange Board of India seeking approval for an initial public offering.

AS of 2025, HMIL is the second largest passenger car exporter and the second largest car manufacturer in India.

== Manufacturing facilities ==
HMIL has two manufacturing plants, one in Irungattukottai, Tamil Nadu and Other in Talegaon, Maharashtra. Irungattukottai Plant has a capacity of 850,000 vehicles per annum.

== R&D centre ==
Hyundai Motor India Engineering (HMIE) is a fully owned subsidiary of Hyundai Motor Company, South Korea, which is located at Hyderabad, Telangana. HMIL established HMIE in November 2006 and contributed to the development of Hyundai Motors' popular new models for the Indian market starting with the Eon and followed now by the "i" series, and also in SUV segments like the Creta. Hyundai Motors' other overseas R&D centres are located in the United States, Germany, Japan, Korea, and China.

== Global Quality Centre ==
Indian Quality Centre (INQC) is one of five quality centres worldwide, along with those in the US, China, Europe and Middle East.

The India centre located at Faridabad, Haryana will conduct durability studies of existing models and benchmark parts and systems for constant improvement.

The key activity of the centre is to "contribute in new car development from pilot stage to create quality product with zero defect".

The centre will also be responsible for ensuring "top level safety quality" through proactive customer oriented management system and understanding feedback from them to eliminate potential risks. The centre also has an objective to study market conditions and other Asia Pacific regions to develop new cars and adapt strategies for continuous product quality improvement.

The company opened a training centre at the facility. It will have its own body and paint unit. The new service training will ensure overall skill development of entire service profile of dealer manpower.

== Models ==
=== Current models ===
==== ICE vehicles ====
| Model | Indian introduction | Current model | |
| Model | Indian introduction | Introduction (model code) | Update (facelift) |
|---|---|---|---|
Hatchback
| Grand i10 Nios | 2007 | 2019 (AI3) | 2023 |
| i20 | 2008 | 2020 (BI3) | 2023 |
Sedan
| Aura | 2020 | 2020 (AI3) | 2023 |
| Verna | 2006 | 2023 (BN7) | 2026 |
SUV/crossover
| Exter | 2023 | 2023 (AI3) | 2026 |
| Venue | 2019 | 2025 (QU2i) | — |
| Bayon | 2026 | 2026 | — |
| Creta | 2015 | 2020 (SU2i) | 2024 |
| Alcazar | 2021 | 2021 (SU2i LWB) | 2024 |

==== Electric vehicles ====
| Model | Indian introduction | Current model | |
| Model | Indian introduction | Introduction (model code) | Update (facelift) |
|---|---|---|---|
SUV/crossover
| Creta Electric | 2025 | 2025 (SU2 EV) | — |
| Ioniq 5 | 2023 | 2023 (NE) | 2026 |

=== Discontinued models ===
Milestones

| Image | Model | Released | Discontinued |
|---|---|---|---|
| | Santro | 1998 | 2022 |
| | Accent | 1999 | 2013 |
| | Sonata | 2001 | 2015 |
| | Terracan | 2003 | 2007 |
| | Elantra | 2004 | 2022 |
| | Getz | 2004 | 2009 |
| | Tucson | 2005 | 2025 |
| | Santa Fe | 2010 | 2017 |
| | Eon | 2011 | 2019 |
| | Xcent | 2014 | 2020 |
| | Kona Electric | 2019 | 2024 |

== Sales and service network ==
As of 2025, HMIL has 1,366 sales points and 1,550 service points across India. HMIL also operates its own dealerships known as Hyundai Motor Plazas in large metros across India. HMIL has the second largest sales and service network in India after Maruti Suzuki.

== Sales and exports ==
Hyundai Motor India Limited annual sales
| Year | Domestic sales | Exports | Total |
|---|---|---|---|
| 1998 | 8,447 | 0 | 8,447 |
| 1999 | 17,627 | 20 | 17,647 |
| 2000 | 82,896 | 3,823 | 86,719 |
| 2001 | 87,175 | 6,092 | 93,267 |
| 2002 | 102,806 | 8,245 | 111,051 |
| 2003 | 120,325 | 30,416 | 150,741 |
| 2004 | 139,759 | 75,871 | 215,630 |
| 2005 | 156,291 | 96,560 | 252,851 |
| 2006 | 186,174 | 113,339 | 299,513 |
| 2007 | 200,411 | 126,749 | 327,160 |
| 2008 | 245,397 | 243,919 | 489,316 |
| 2009 | 289,863 | 270,017 | 559,880 |
| 2010 | 356,717 | 247,102 | 603,819 |
| 2011 | 373,709 | 242,330 | 616,039 |
| 2012 | 391,276 | 250,005 | 641,281 |
| 2013 | 380,000 | 233,260 | 613,260 |
| 2014 | 410,000 | 191,221 | 601,221 |
| 2015 | 476,001 | 167,268 | 643,269 |
| 2016 | 500,537 | 161,517 | 662,054 |
| 2017 | 527,320 | 150,901 | 678,221 |
| 2018 | 550,002 | 160,010 | 710,012 |
| 2019 | 510,260 | 181,200 | 691,460 |

HMIL currently exports vehicles to over 92 countries across Africa, Middle East, Latin America, Australia and Asia.

In February 2010 HMIL achieved a record export of 1 million units.

HMIL has been consecutively awarded "Top Exporter Of The Year" for 10 years by EEPC. The highest exported volume was 2,70,017 in year 2009. As of 2025, HMIL is the second largest car exporter in India following Maruti Suzuki.

== Awards and achievements ==
- Indian Car of the Year (ICOTY)
  - 2008 — Hyundai i10
  - 2014 — Hyundai Grand i10
  - 2015 — Hyundai Elite i20
  - 2016 — Hyundai Creta
  - 2018 — Hyundai Verna
  - 2020 — Hyundai Venue
  - 2021 - Hyundai i20
- J D Power Appeal Awards 2016 demonstrating excellence of 'Made In India' Products as per global standards for Grand i10, Elite i20 & Creta.
- JD Power Indian Customer Satisfaction Award 2017 – For Ranking Number 1 in After Sales Customer satisfaction.

== Brand ambassador ==
The carmaker got Shah Rukh Khan on board as its brand ambassador for the Hyundai Xcent, the company's recently launched sub-compact sedan in India. 1998, SRK shot his first TVC for the Hyundai Santro, and his association with the car brand has now turned 23.

In 2010 Khan won the "Brand Ambassador of the Year" for Hyundai i10 at NDTV Profit Car and Bike Awards.

Khan also promotes the "Be The Better Guy" road safety campaign for Hyundai.

In July 2017, Hyundai India extended Khan's contract for two years.

In 2024 Hyundai Motor India appointed Deepika Padukone as brand ambassador along with Shah Rukh Khan ahead with Hyundai Creta Facelift.

== Charging Network ==
Hyundai Motor India has added 11 ultra-fast charging stations strategically located across major highways and cities in India. And have plans to install 100 more charging stations by 2027.

== Hyundai Motor India Foundation ==
In 2021, the Hyundai Motor India Foundation (HMIF), the philanthropic arm of Hyundai Motor India Ltd., announced a new initiative, Art for Hope. It will work towards encouraging artists across various domains like digital arts, crafts, multidisciplinary arts, performance arts and visual arts. The project is scheduled to begin October 2021. Selected artists will get an opportunity to exchange ideas, complete an art project and be mentored by key industry people. The final projects will be displayed in art shows across India.

== Potential Expansion ==
As of September 2026, there is conversation around expanding the footprint of Hyundai in India by adding a third plant by 2030 due to the expectation of India being an emerging growth market for Hyundai. The plan is in the early stages and a site has not been chosen, but the proposed plant would be large enough to increase production capacity within India by 500,000 units. This expansion would be in addition to the Sriperumbudur and Talegaon plants already within the country.

== See also ==
- Hyundai Motor Group
- Automotive industry in India
- List of Hyundai Motor Company manufacturing facilities
