= Texter (surname) =

Texter is a surname. Notable people with the surname include:

- Gilda Texter (born 1946), American costume designer, wardrobe supervisor, and actress
- John Texter (born 1949), American engineer

== See also ==
- Dexter (name)
- Exter (surname)
- Textor (surname)
