= Hyundai Aura =

City car

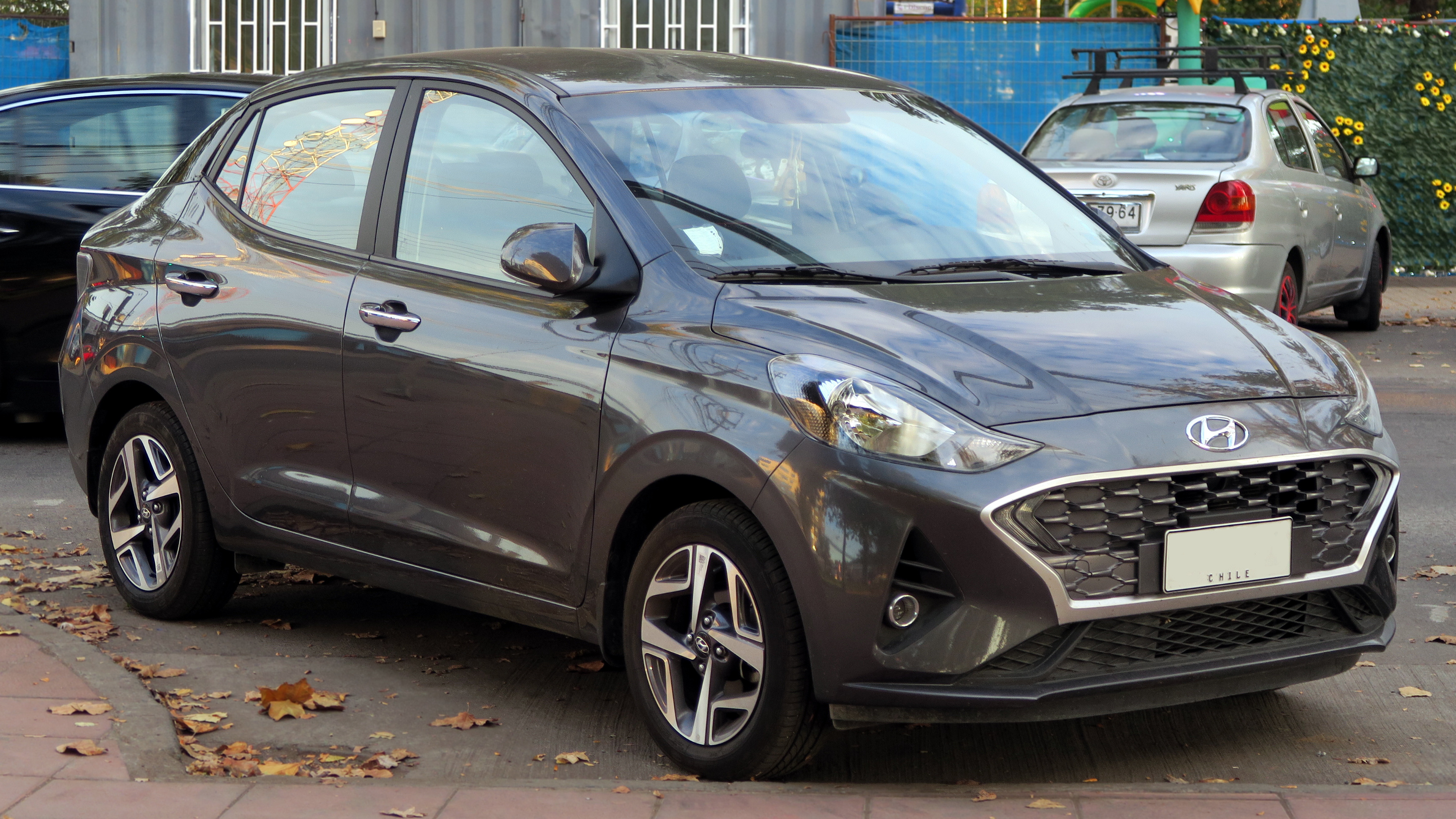
- Hyundai Grand i10 Sedan (Chile, pre-facelift)

Overview
- Manufacturer: Hyundai
- Model code: AI3
- Also called: Hyundai Grand i10 sedan Hyundai Prime SD (India, fleet)
- Production: 2020–present
- Assembly: India: Chennai (HMIL); Vietnam: Ninh Bình (Hyundai Thanh Cong Vietnam)
- Designer: Ju Hyun Ha

Body and chassis
- Class: Subcompact car
- Body style: 4-door sedan
- Layout: Front-engine, front-wheel-drive
- Platform: Hyundai-Kia K1
- Related: Hyundai Grand i10 Nios (AI3); Hyundai Exter

Powertrain
- Engine: Petrol: 1.0 L Kappa II turbo GDI I3; 1.2 L Kappa II I4; Diesel: 1.2 L U II CRDI I3
- Transmission: 5-speed manual; 5-speed automated manual

Dimensions
- Wheelbase: 2,450 mm (96.5 in)
- Length: 3,995 mm (157.3 in)
- Width: 1,680 mm (66.1 in)
- Height: 1,520 mm (59.8 in)

Chronology
- Predecessor: Hyundai Xcent

The Hyundai Aura is a city car produced by the South Korean manufacturer Hyundai. It is a sedan based on the third generation Hyundai i10 (Hyundai Grand i10 Nios in India), and was designed primarily for the Indian market. It is the successor to the Hyundai Xcent, a different nameplate is used as the Xcent remained in production mainly for fleet and commercial customers. The Aura was launched on 21 January 2020 in India.

The Aura features an 8.0-inch touchscreen infotainment with Android Auto system and Apple CarPlay compatibility, a Arkamys music system and a half-digital instrument cluster. Additionally, it is also well equipped with comfort features such as wireless charging, rear AC vent, rear centre armrest.

The Aura is available with three engine options. The only diesel option is the U-Line 1.2 L turbodiesel producing 75 PS (55 kW; 74 hp). The petrol engine is a 1.2 L naturally aspirated petrol engine shared with the Grand i10 Nios, and a 1.0 L turbocharged GDI petrol unit which can generate 100 PS (74 kW; 99 hp) of peak power.

The Hyundai Aura CNG has a 1.2-liter petrol engine that can run on both petrol and CNG. The engine is BS6 compliant and produces a maximum power of 68 horsepower at 6,000rpm and a maximum torque of 95Nm at 4,000rpm.

The facelift Aura was launched on 23 January 2023 in India, featuring a redesigned front fascia.

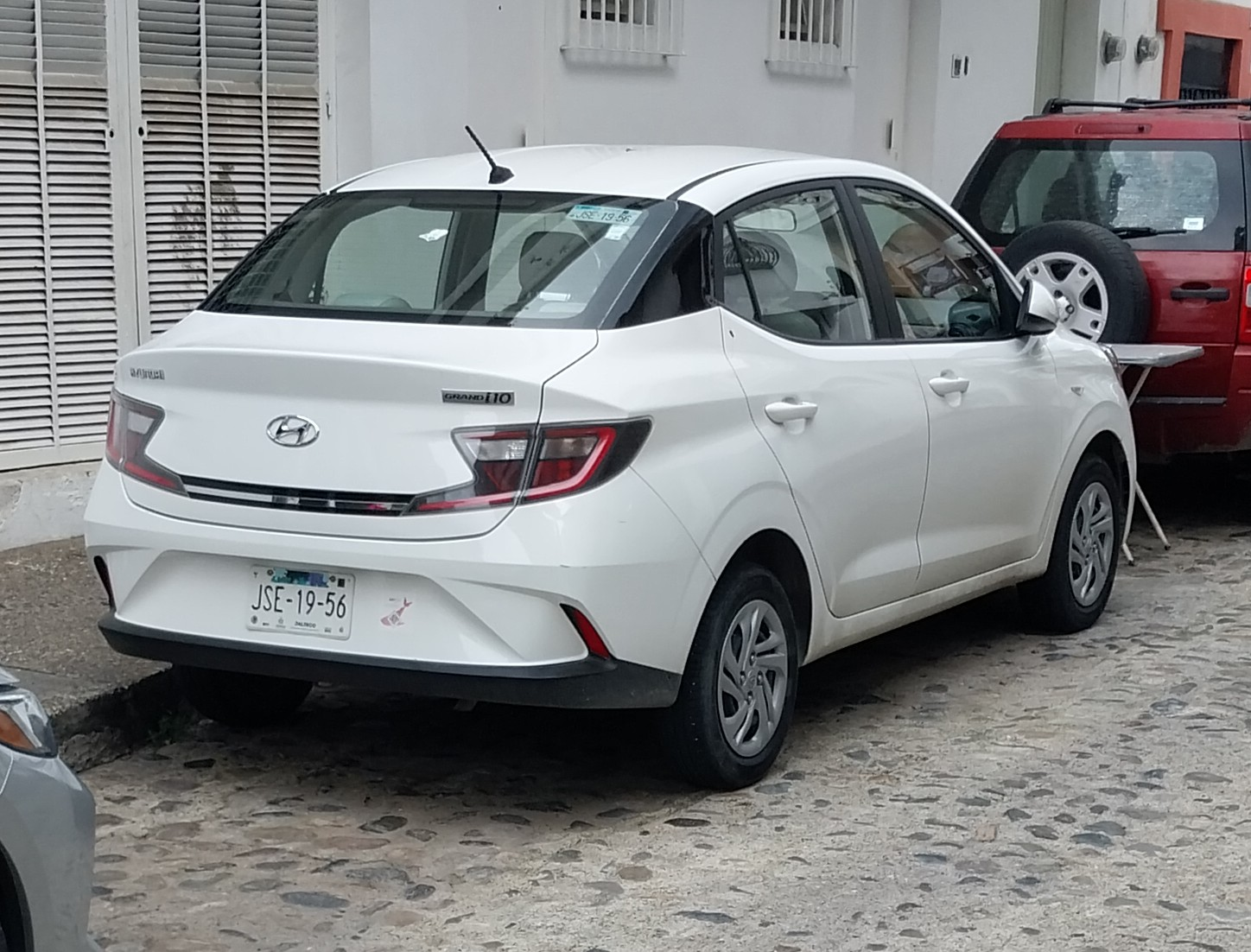
Rear view

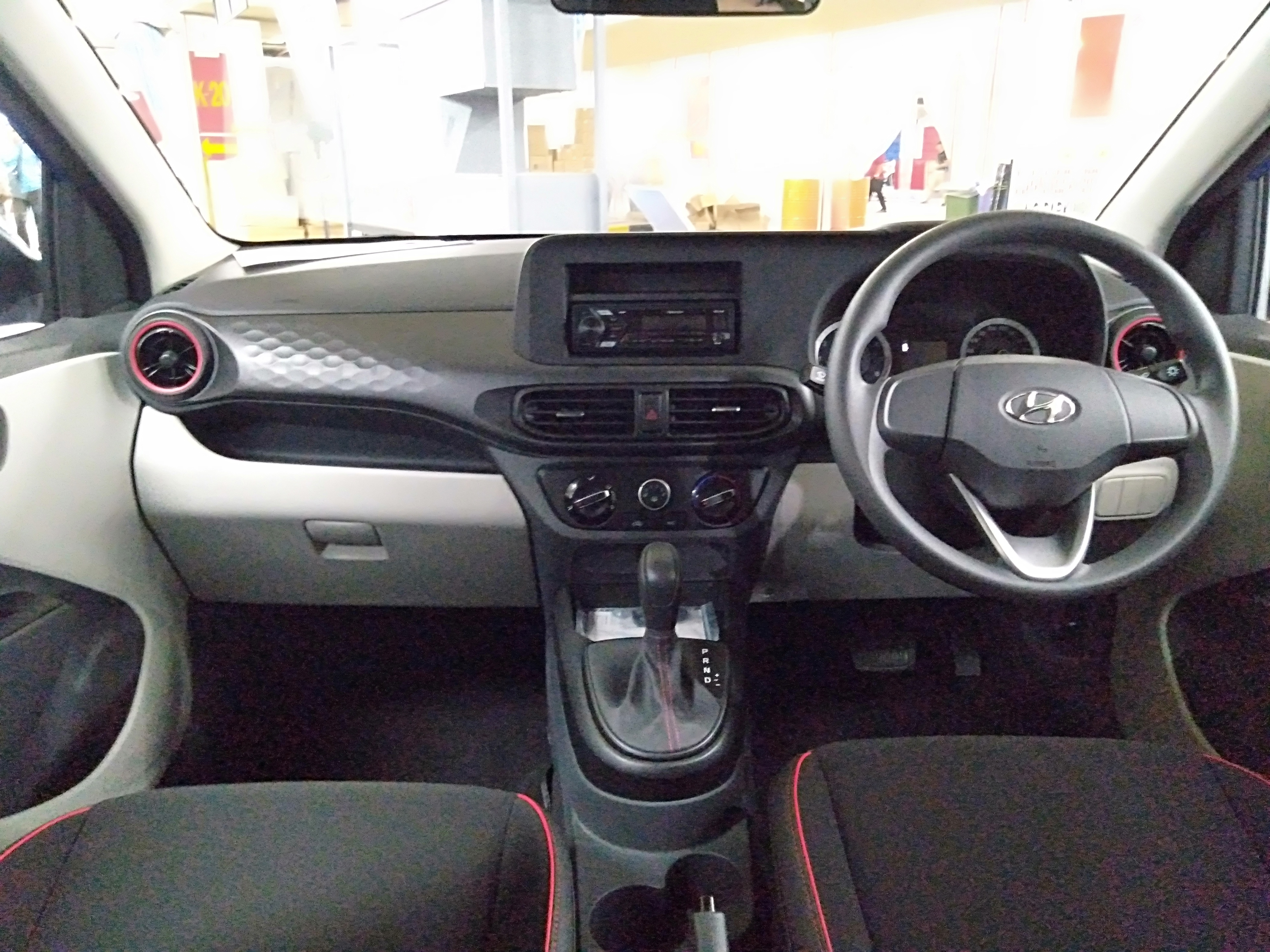
Interior (RHD)

== See also ==
- List of Hyundai vehicles
