= Textor =

Textor is a surname of German and Dutch origin, meaning "weaver". Notable people with the surname include:

- Benoit Textor (c. 1509–c. 1565), French physician and naturalist
- Clinton Textor (1856–1943), American politician and jurist
- Friedrich Karl Ludwig Textor [de] (1775–1851), German jurist and dialect writer
- George Textor (1886–1954), American baseball player
- John Textor (born 1965), American businessman
- Jean Tixier de Ravisi (c. 1470–1542), French scholar, also known as Johannes Textor Ravisius

== See also ==
- Texter (surname)
