= Hyundai Xcent =

Subcompact car

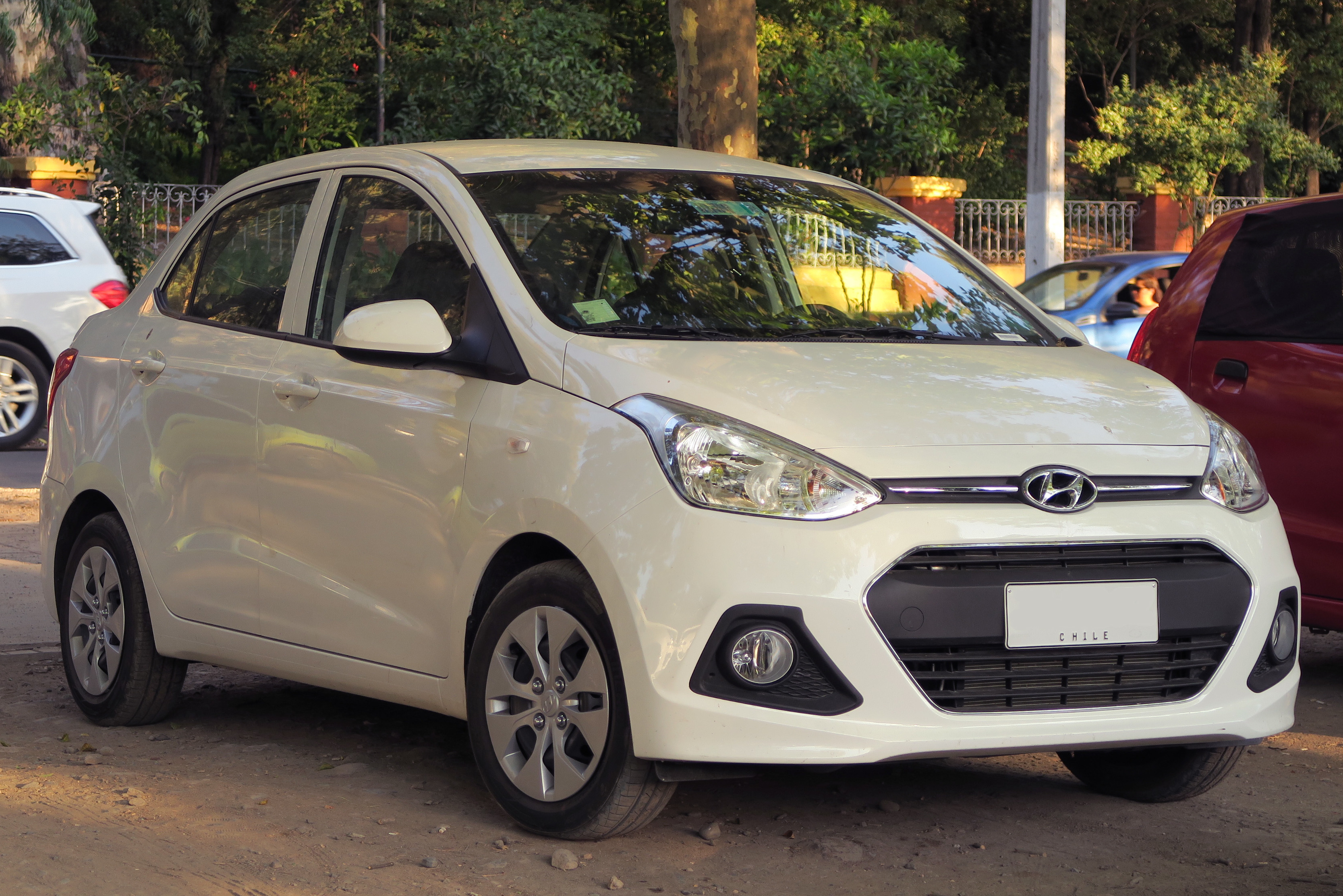

Overview
- Manufacturer: Hyundai
- Model code: BA
- Also called: Hyundai Grand i10 sedan Hyundai Grand i Smart (Laos); Hyundai Grand Metro Taxi (Colombia)
- Production: 2014–2020; 2018–2023 (fleets only)
- Assembly: India: Chennai (HMIL); Vietnam: Ninh Bình (Hyundai Thanh Cong Vietnam)

Body and chassis
- Class: Subcompact car
- Body style: 4-door sedan
- Layout: Front-engine, front-wheel-drive
- Platform: Hyundai-Kia BA
- Related: Hyundai Grand i10 (BA)

Powertrain
- Engine: 1.2 L Kappa II I4 (petrol); 1.1 L U-Line I3 (diesel)
- Transmission: 5-speed manual; 4-speed automatic

Dimensions
- Wheelbase: 2,425 mm (95.5 in)
- Length: 3,995 mm (157.3 in)
- Width: 1,660 mm (65.4 in)
- Height: 1,520 mm (59.8 in)

Chronology
- Successor: Hyundai Aura

The Hyundai Xcent is a subcompact car produced by the South Korean manufacturer Hyundai. Based on the Hyundai Grand i10, the Xcent is a sedan manufactured by Hyundai Motor India Limited in Chennai. The Xcent was launched on 12 March 2014, being conceived to fit in the popular sub-4 metre sedan segment in India which emerged after the government imposed larger tax for cars longer than 4,000 mm (157.5 in) in length. It is also sold in markets outside India as the Hyundai Grand i10 Sedan.

== Marketing ==
In September 2014, Indian actor Shah Rukh Khan signed with Hyundai Motors India to be the brand ambassador for the Xcent.

== Discontinuation ==
In June 2019, Hyundai Motor India confirmed that the production of the Xcent would be discontinued by 2020 in India, the reason being that the Xcent nameplate was being used for taxi purposes. The Xcent would be replaced by the Hyundai Aura in 2020. The Xcent would be sold alongside the Aura as a fleet sales only.

== Gallery ==
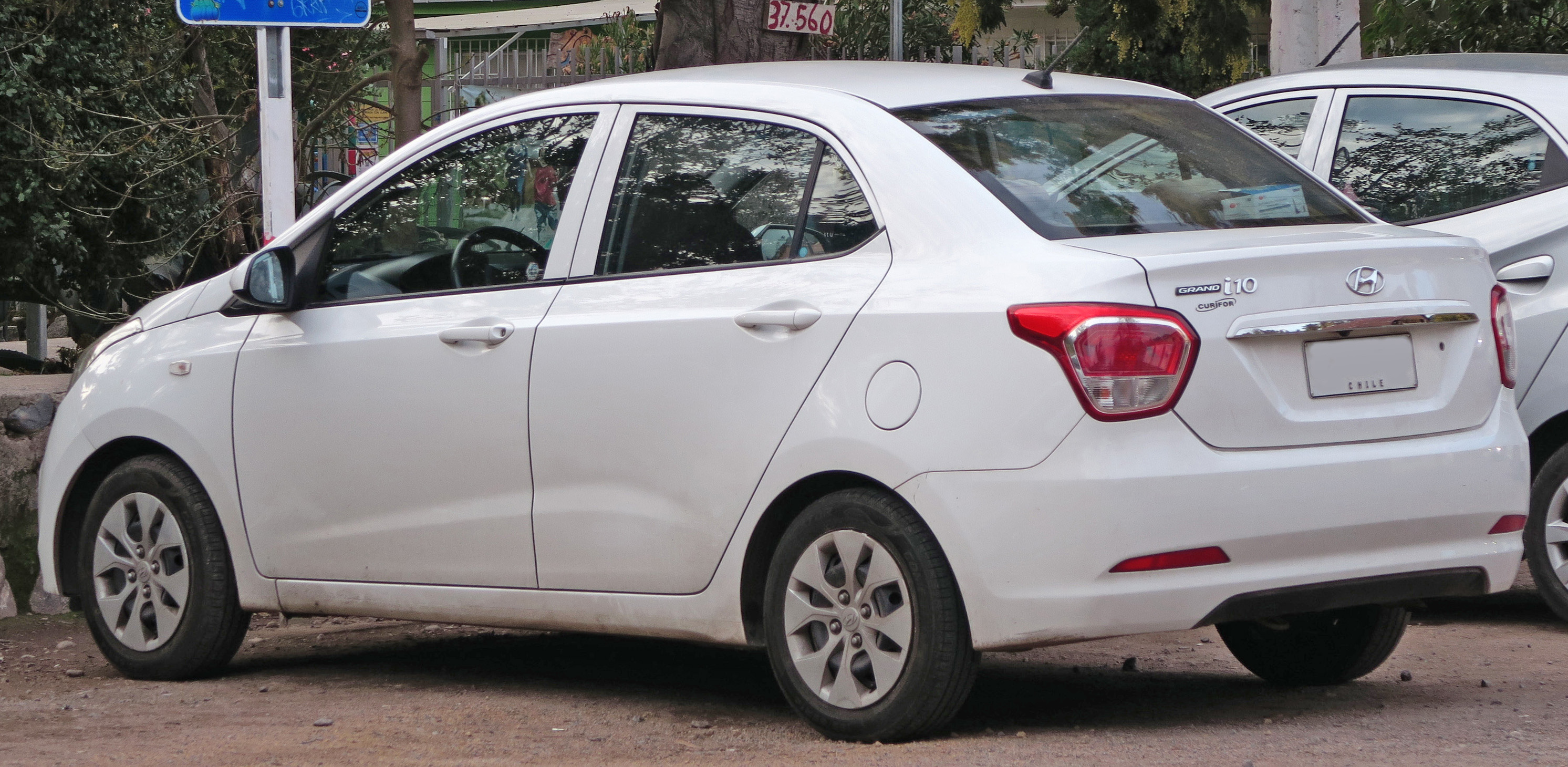
Hyundai Grand i10 sedan (Chile)

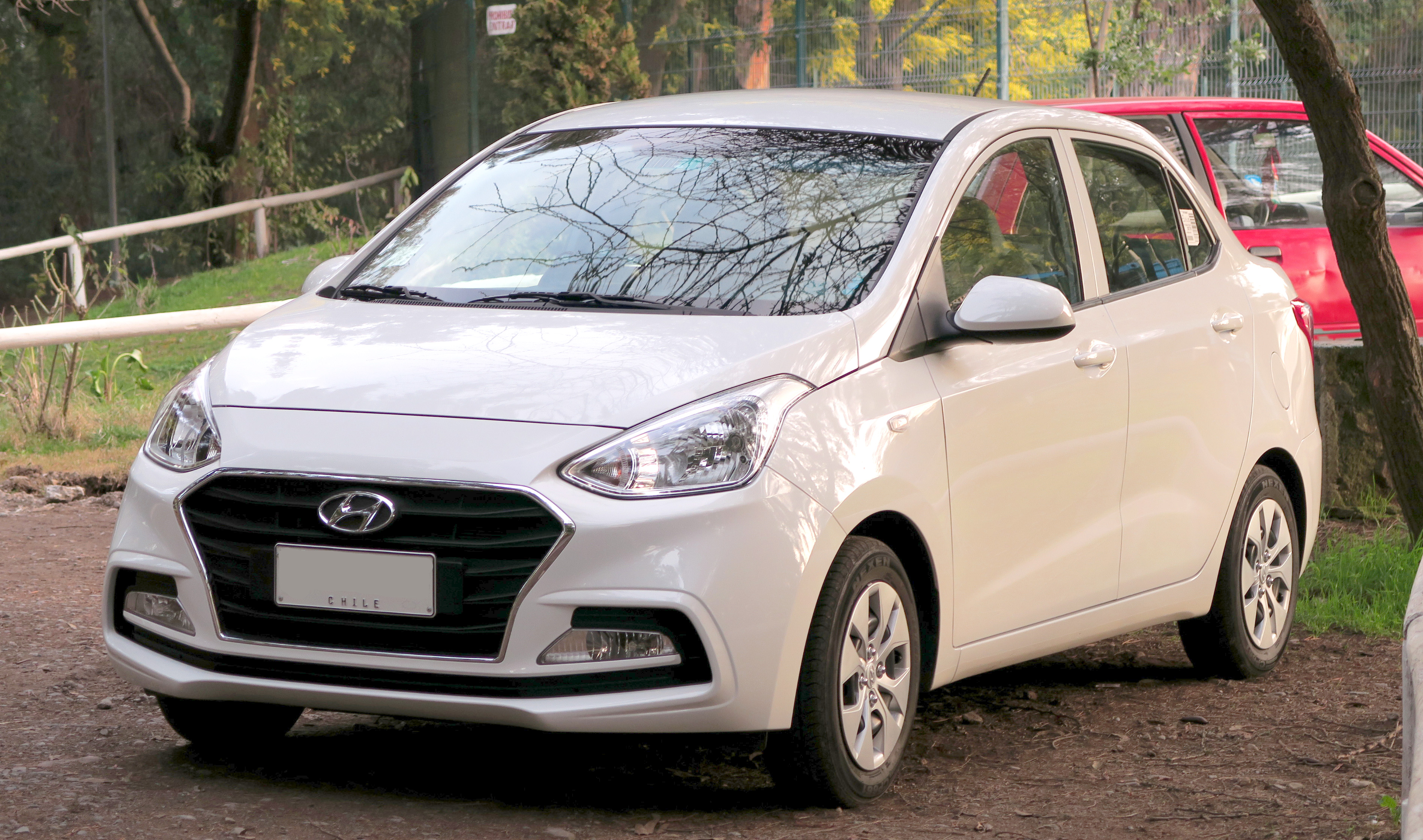
Hyundai Grand i10 sedan (Chile; facelift)
