= Hyundai Exter =

Crossover city car

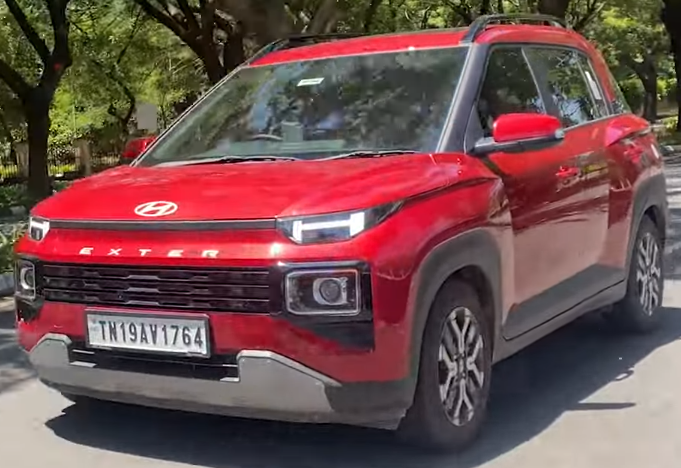

Overview
- Manufacturer: Hyundai
- Model code: AI3 CUV
- Production: June 2023 – present
- Assembly: India: Chennai (HMIL)
- Designer: Cho-hee Park

Body and chassis
- Class: Crossover city car (A)
- Body style: 5-door mini SUV
- Layout: Front-engine, front-wheel-drive
- Platform: Hyundai-Kia K1
- Related: Hyundai Grand i10 Nios; Hyundai Aura

Powertrain
- Engine: Petrol: 1.2 L Kappa II MPI I4; Petrol/CNG: 1.2 L Kappa II MPI I4
- Transmission: 5-speed manual; 5-speed AMT

Dimensions
- Wheelbase: 2,450 mm (96.5 in)
- Length: 3,830 mm (150.8 in)
- Width: 1,710 mm (67.3 in)
- Height: 1,631 mm (64.2 in)

The Hyundai Exter is an (A-segment) crossover city car manufactured by the South Korean automaker Hyundai since 2023.

First unveiled in India in the second quarter of 2023, it is the smallest crossover from Hyundai in its local lineup as an alternative to the Casper.

== Design ==
Styling features include H-shaped LED daytime running lights and square headlights, alongside large intakes on the front bumper.

It is based on the Grand i10 hatchback and Aura sedan, sharing the same platform, engine options, and dashboard design.

== Facelift (2026) ==
The Exter facelift was launched on 20 March 2026.

== Markets ==
=== India ===
The Exter was launched in India on 10 July 2023, with five trim levels: EX, S, SX, SX (O), and SX (O) Connect. The CNG powertrain is available on the S and SX trim levels. Since pre-bookings opened until launch, there were over 11,000 bookings made, with the AMT variants made up 38% and the CNG models accounted for 20%.

=== South Africa ===
The Exter was launched in South Africa on 17 September 2024, with three trim levels: Premium, Executive and Elite. The Premium and Executive trim levels come standard with a 5-speed manual, while the 5-speed automated manual transmission is standard for the Elite trim but optional on the former two trim levels.

In September 2026, the Cargo Van model was introduced in South Africa. It is homologated as a light commercial vehicle with the deletion of rear seats, a mesh divider behind the front seats and mesh inserts on the rear side windows.

== Awards ==
In December 2023, Hyundai Exter was selected as the Indian Car of the Year (ICOTY) 2024.

== See also ==
- List of Hyundai vehicles
