= Crossover SUV =

Style of motor vehicle

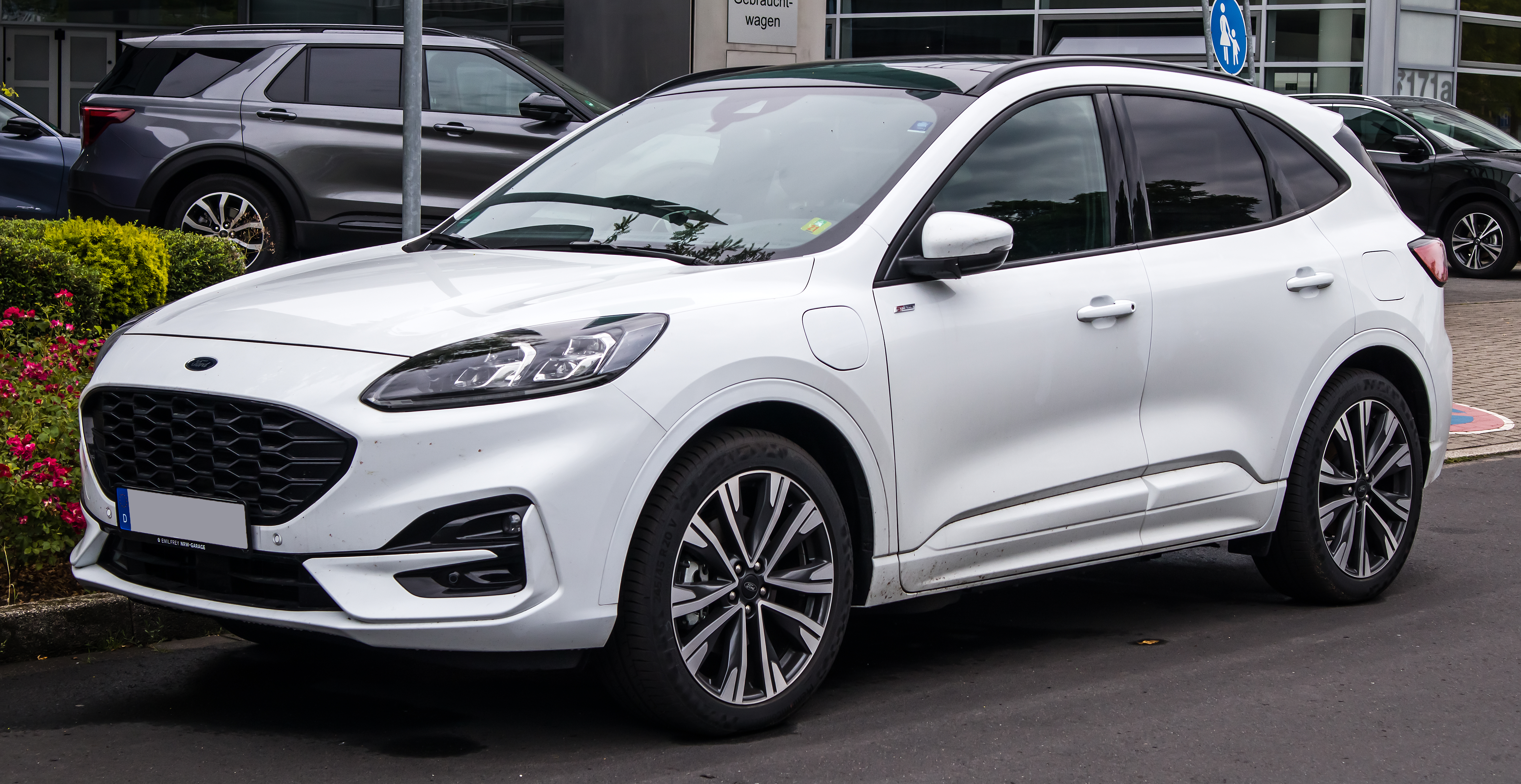
Ford Escape/Kuga compact crossover

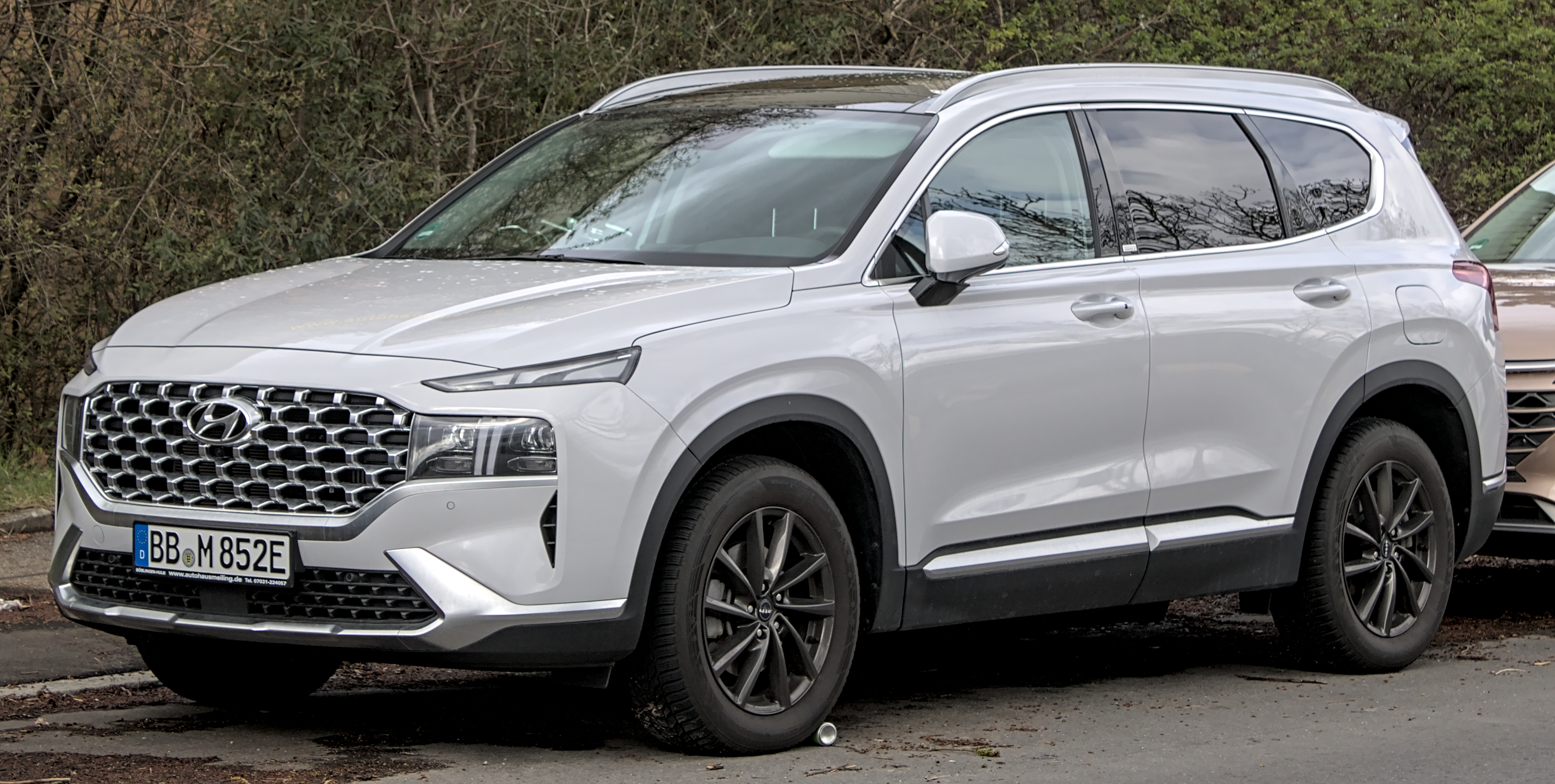
Hyundai Santa Fe mid-size crossover

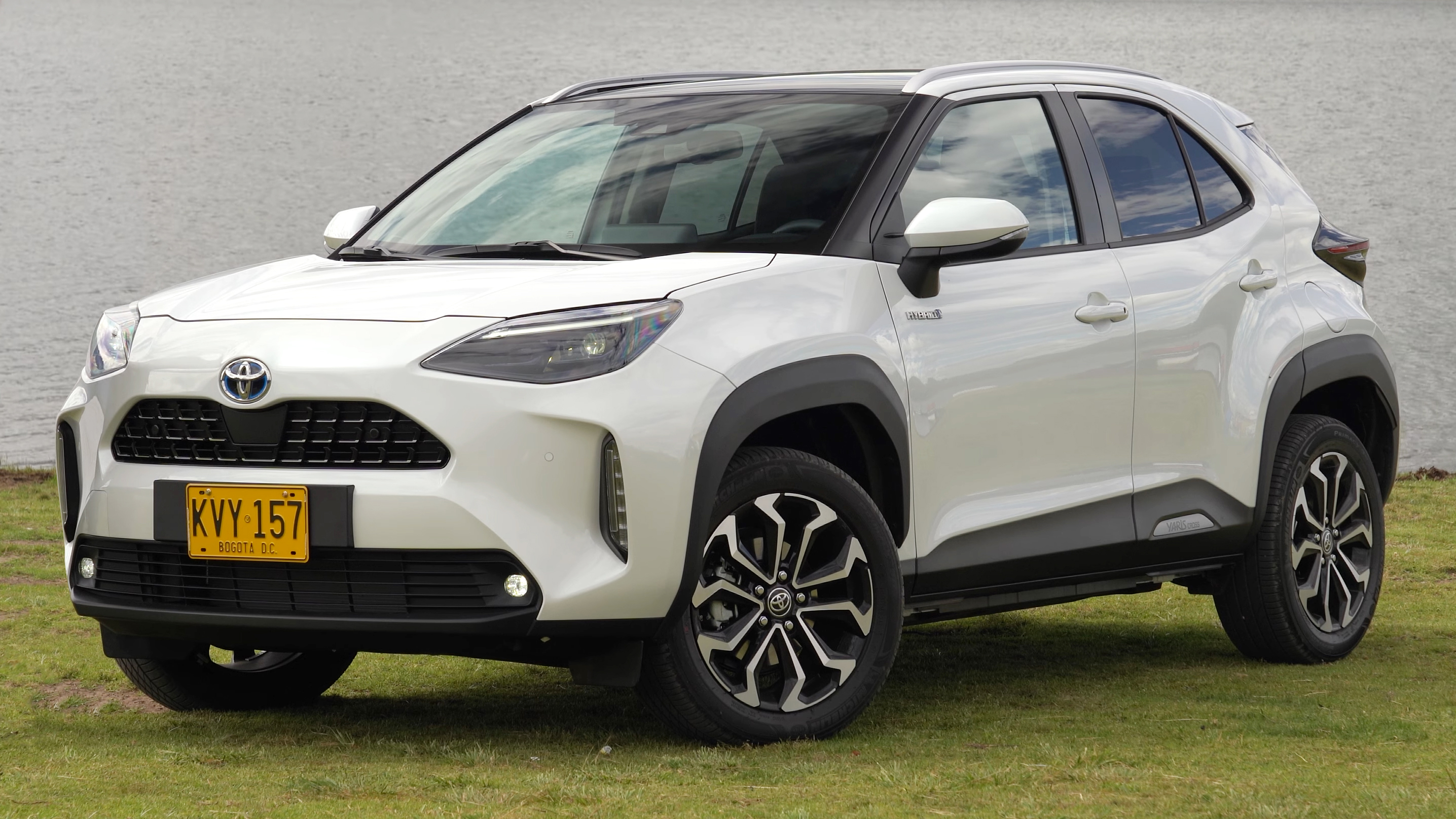
Toyota Yaris Cross subcompact crossover

A crossover, crossover SUV, or crossover utility vehicle (CUV) is a type of automobile with an increased ride height built on a unibody chassis construction shared with passenger cars, as opposed to traditional sport utility vehicles (SUVs), which are built on a body-on-frame chassis construction similar to pickup trucks.

Originating in North America, the term crossover was initially used for any vehicle that blends characteristics of two kinds of vehicle, but over time came to refer predominantly to unibody-based SUVs. SUV is often used as an umbrella term for both crossovers and traditional SUVs due to their similarities.

Compared to traditional SUVs, crossovers are known to be less capable in off-road conditions and hauling heavy loads but offer advantages such as improved fuel economy and handling. Compared to traditional cars with a lower ride height and lower roofs (such as sedans and hatchbacks), crossovers offer larger cabin space and higher driving position.

The 1977 Lada Niva was the world's first mass-produced unibody off-road vehicle and has been described as a forerunner to the crossover before that term was used, with the AMC Eagle introduced in 1979 being the first example in the United States. The Toyota RAV4, introduced in 1994, has also been described as initiating the modern concept of the crossover.

In the US, the market share of crossovers has grown from under 4% in 2000 to nearly 40% in 2018.

== Definition ==
The difference between crossover SUVs and other SUVs as generally defined by journalists and manufacturers is that a crossover is built using a unibody platform, while an SUV is built using a body-on-frame platform. However, this distinction are often blurred in practice, since unibody vehicles are also often referred to as SUVs. "Crossover" is a relatively recent term, and early unibody SUVs (such as the 1984 Jeep Cherokee (XJ)) are rarely called crossovers. Due to these inconsistencies, the term "SUV" is often used as an umbrella term for both crossovers and traditional SUVs.

U.S. magazine MotorTrend in 2005 mentioned that the term "crossover" has become "blurred as manufacturers apply it to everything from the Chrysler Pacifica to the Ford Five Hundred sedan". At that time, the publication proposes that the term "soft-roader" is more appropriate.

Some regions outside North America do not have a distinction between a crossover SUV and body-on-frame SUV, calling both of them SUVs. Several government bodies in the United States also did not acknowledge the crossover distinction, including the United States Environmental Protection Agency (EPA). In some jurisdictions, crossovers are classified as light trucks as are traditional SUVs and pickup trucks.

Outside the United States, the term "crossover" tends to be used for C-segment (compact) or smaller vehicles, with large unibody vehicles—such as the Audi Q7, Range Rover, Porsche Cayenne, and Volkswagen Touareg—usually referred to as SUVs rather than crossovers. In the United Kingdom, a crossover is sometimes defined as a hatchback with raised ride height and SUV-like styling features. The Sunday Times noted the number of "soft-roader" cars on sale in 2019.

== Characteristics ==
Crossovers' driving characteristics and performance are similar to those of traditional passenger cars while providing more passenger and cargo space with relatively minor trade-offs in fuel economy and running costs. According to Consumer Reports, the three top-selling crossovers in the US in 2018 (Toyota RAV4, Honda CR-V, and Nissan Rogue) return an average of 10% less fuel economy than the top three selling sedan equivalents in the mid-size segment (Toyota Camry, Honda Accord, Nissan Altima), but provide almost 1.5 times the cargo space. Furthermore, the average mid-size crossover in the US costs less than 5% more than the average mid-size car.

Compared to truck-based SUVs, crossovers typically have greater interior comfort, a more comfortable ride, better fuel economy, and lower manufacturing costs, but inferior off-road and towing capabilities. Many crossovers lack an all-wheel drive or four-wheel-drive train, which, in combination with their inferior off-road capability, causes many journalists and consumers to question their definition as "sports utility vehicles". This has led some to describe crossovers as pseudo-SUVs.

== History ==
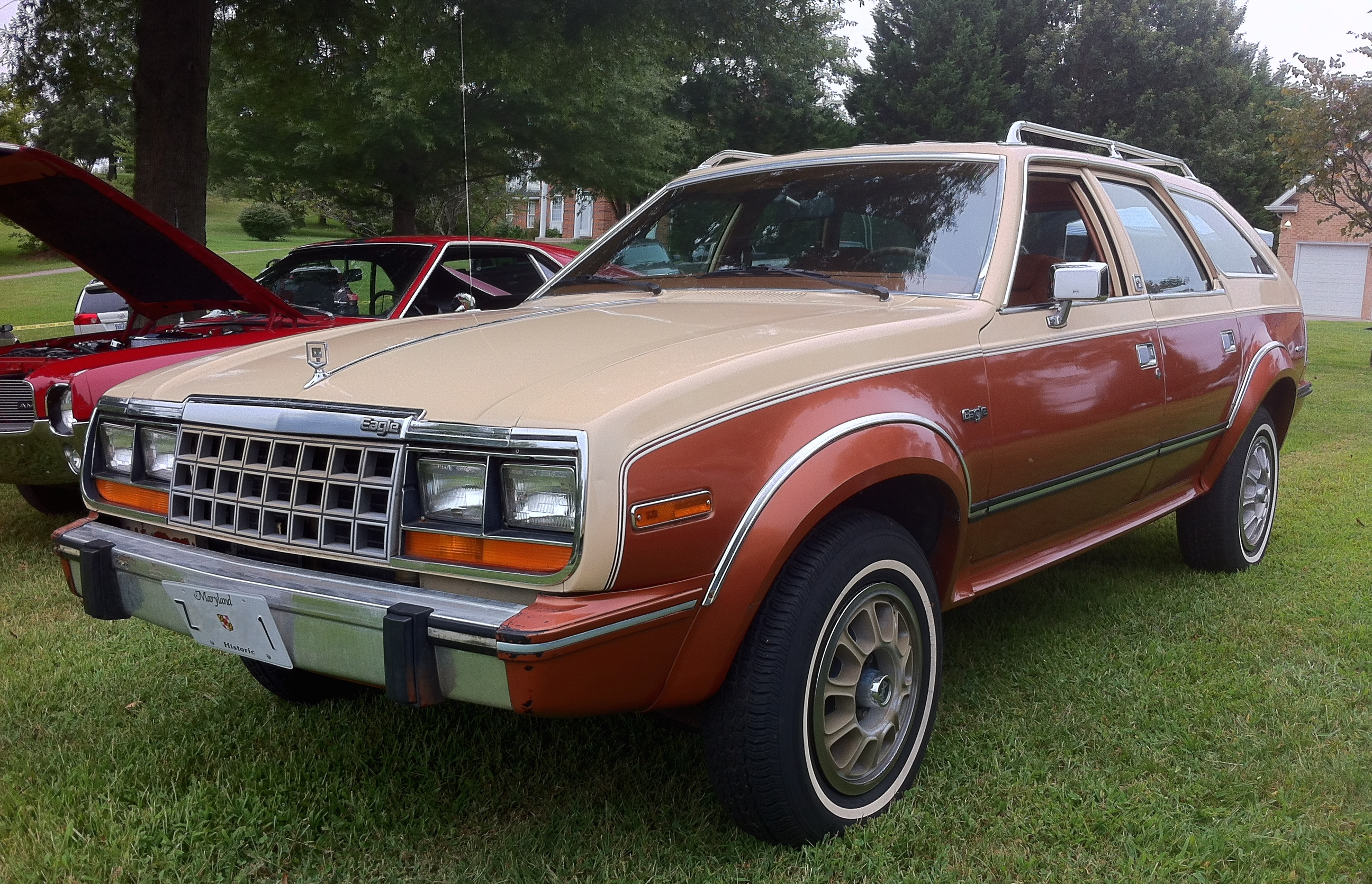
1979–1987 AMC Eagle

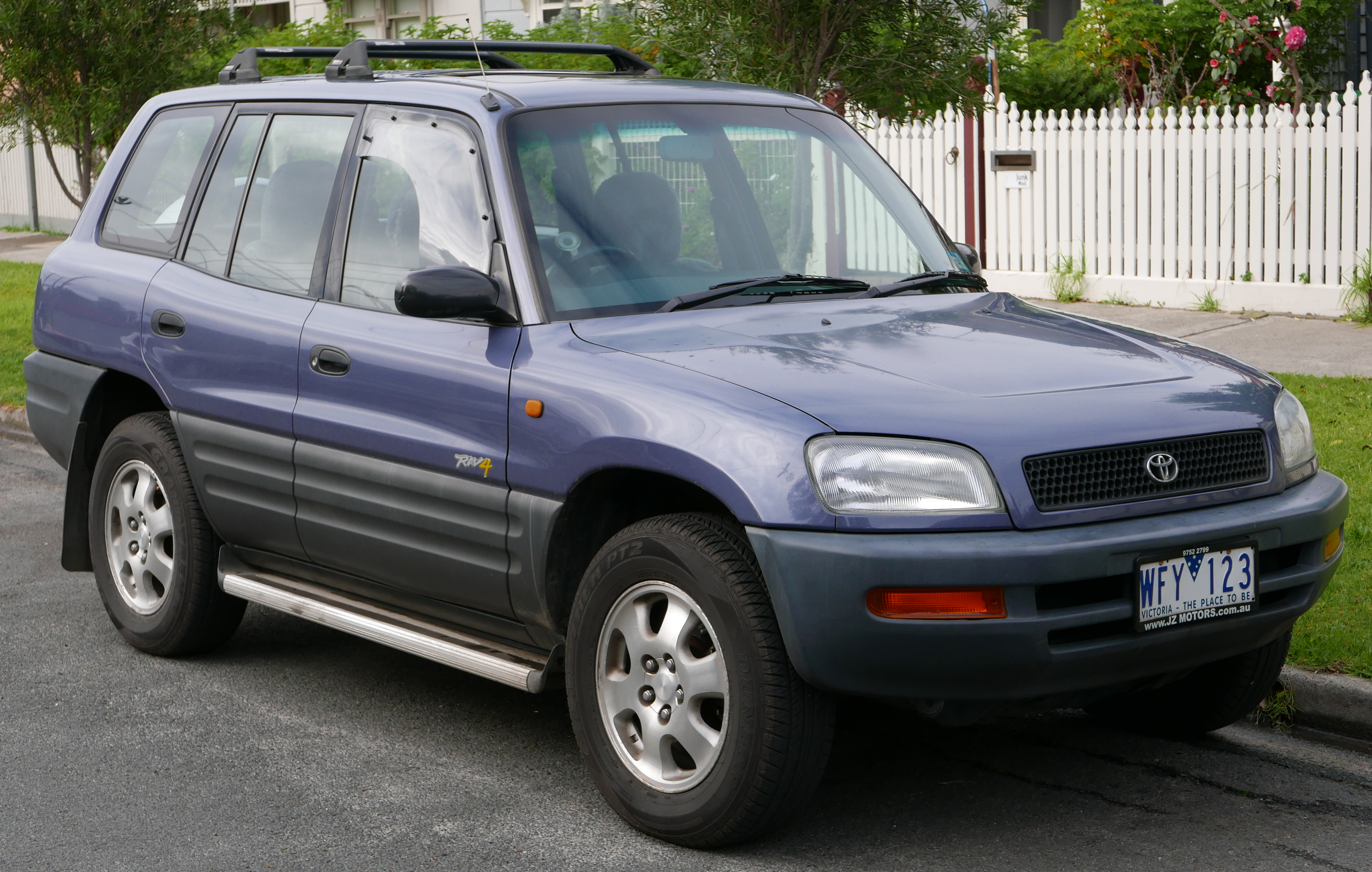
1995 Toyota RAV4

Introduced in 1979, prior to the terms "SUV" or "crossover" being coined, the AMC Eagle is retroactively considered to be the first dedicated crossover automobile. The mass-market Eagle model line was based on a unibody passenger car platform, with fully-automatic four-wheel drive and a raised ride height. Furthermore, a writer for Motor Trend characterized the 1963 Studebaker Wagonaire as the "first crossover" because the innovative station wagon with a sliding roof "mashed up various vehicle types." It was available only with a conventional rear-wheel drive.

Others cite the front-wheel drive 1977 Matra Rancho as a slightly earlier forerunner to the modern crossover. Marketed as a "lifestyle" vehicle, it was not available with four-wheel drive. In 1981, American Motors Corporation (AMC) introduced four-wheel drive subcompact models built on the two-door AMC Spirit, the "Eagle SX/4" and "Eagle Kammback". These low-priced models joined the compact AMC Eagle line and they foreshadowed the market segment of comfortable cars with utility and foul-weather capabilities.

The first-generation Toyota RAV4, released in 1994, has been credited as the model that expanded the concept of a modern crossover. The RAV4 was based on a modified platform used by the Toyota Corolla and Toyota Carina. At its release, Toyota in Japan used the term "4x4 vehicle" to describe the model, while Toyota in the US called the vehicle a "new concept SUV". By the early 2000s, Toyota was leading the market in its development of car-based trucks in North America with the release of other crossover models such as the Highlander and the Lexus RX.

In North America, crossovers increased in popularity during the 2000s, when fuel efficiency standards for light trucks, which had been stuck at 20.7 miles per US gallon (11.4 L/100 km; 8.8 km/L) since 1996, moved upwards by 2005. With increasing fuel prices, traditional SUVs began to lose market share to crossovers. In the United States as of 2006, crossover models comprised more than 50% of the overall SUV market. Crossovers have become increasingly popular in Europe also since the early 2010s.

In the first quarter of 2023 the Tesla Model Y crossover became the best-selling vehicle in the world.

== Size categories ==
Depending on the market, crossovers are divided into several size categories. Since there is an absence of any official distinction, often the size category is ambiguous for some crossover models. Several aspects needed to determine the size category of a vehicle may include length and width, positioning in its respective brand line-up, platform, and interior space.

=== Crossover city car (A-segment) ===
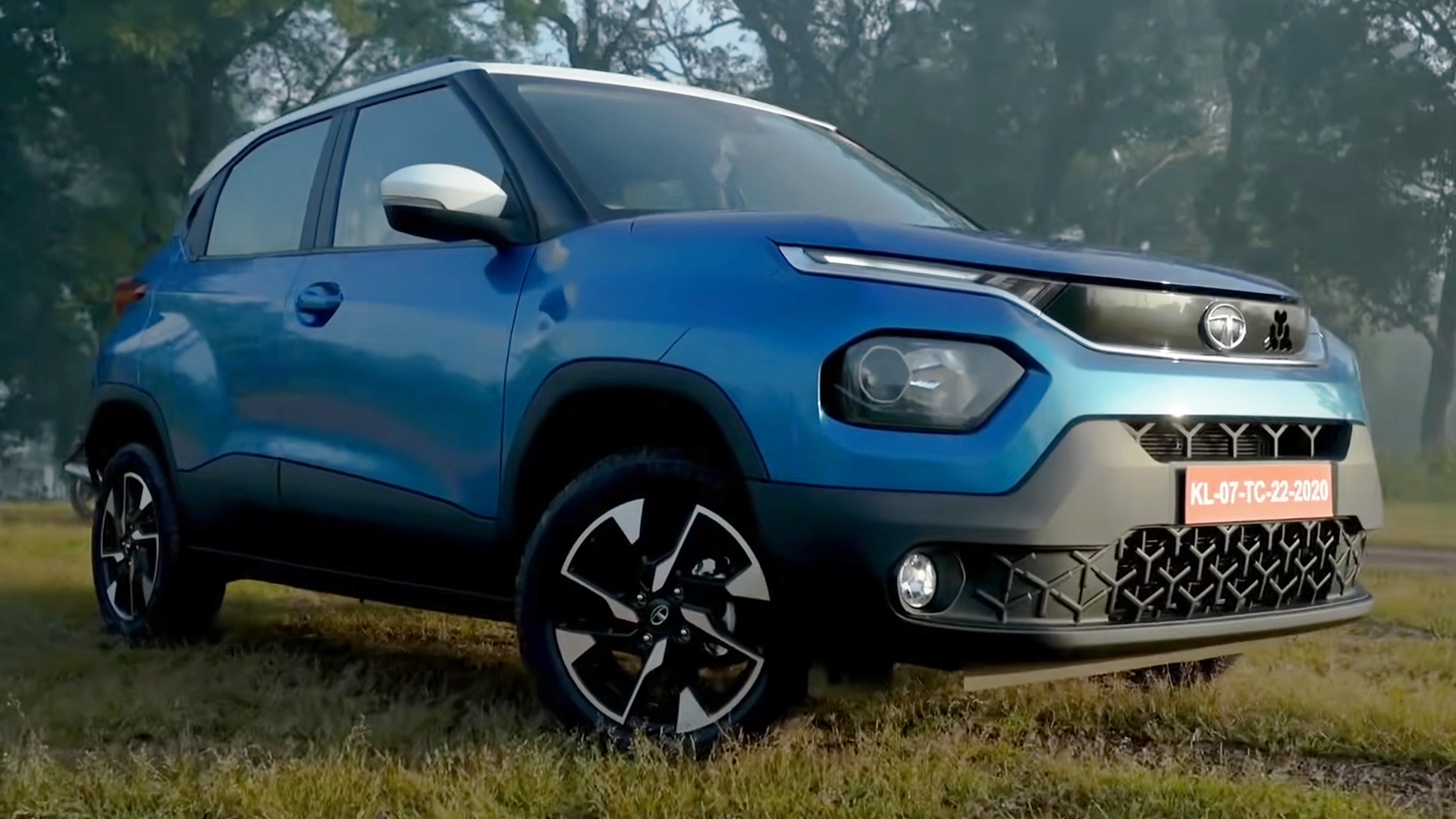
Tata Punch, the best-selling A-segment in India

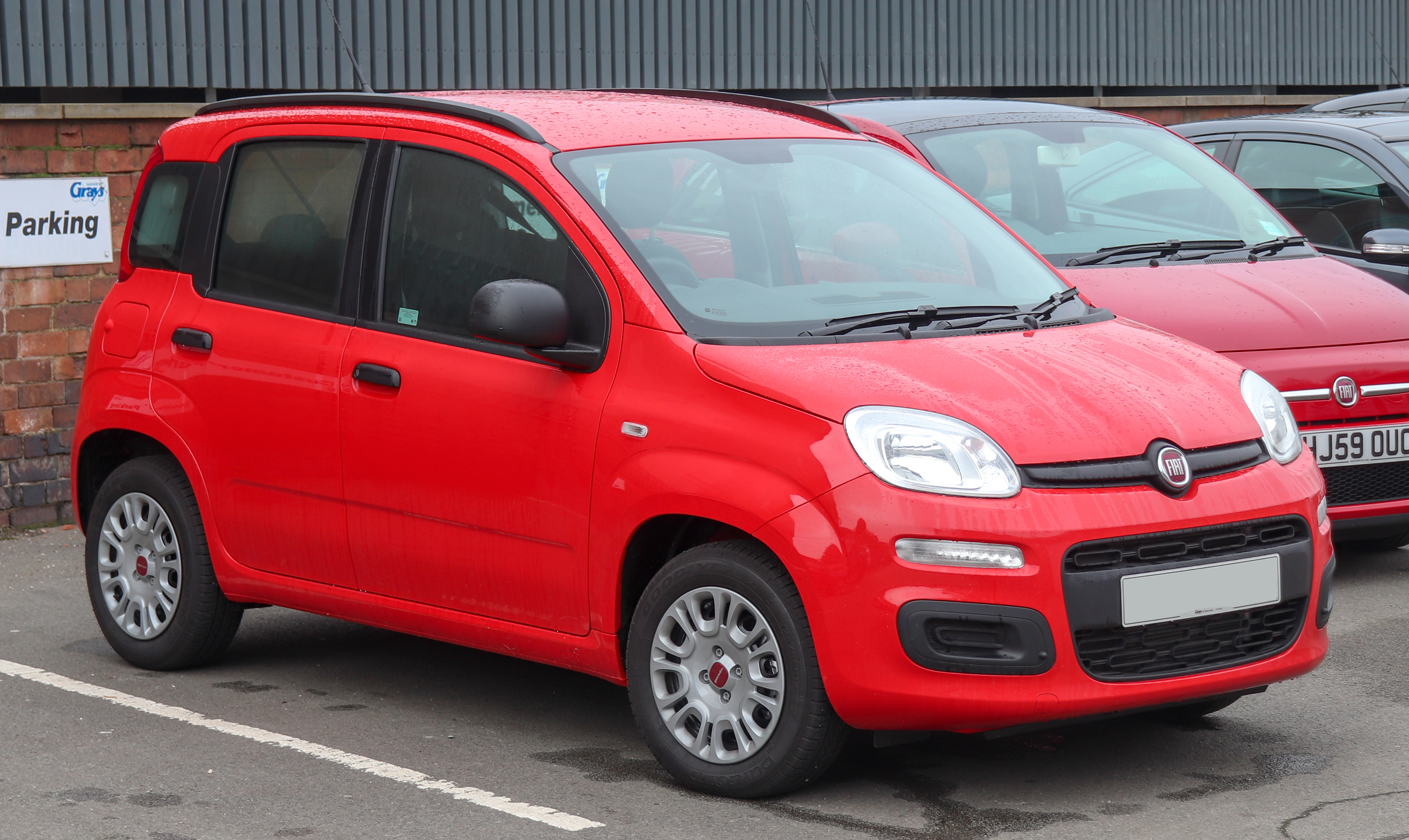
Fiat Panda, the best-selling A-segment in Europe

Crossover city cars (also called A-SUVs, city SUVs, city crossovers, or A-segment SUVs) are crossovers that generally ride on the platform of a city car (A-segment).

Crossover city car is a newly introduced automotive vehicle segment, with the first vehicle in the segment being the Fiat Panda Cross, though the Suzuki Ignis helped bring the segment more attention. Cars in this segment are generally styled as hatchbacks.

Since the late 2010s, the segment has received significantly more attention. As of 2026, examples include the Toyota Aygo X, Hyundai Casper, Renault Kwid, VinFast VF 5, Suzuki Xbee, Fiat Panda Cross/City Cross, Tata Punch and Hyundai Exter.

=== Subcompact crossover SUV (B-segment) ===
Subcompact crossover SUVs (also called B-segment crossover SUV, B-SUV, small SUV) are crossovers that are usually based on the platform of a subcompact (also known as supermini or B-segment) passenger car, although some high-end subcompact crossover models are based on a compact car (C-segment).

The segment may be called differently depending on the market. In several regions, the category may be known as "compact crossover" or "compact SUV" instead.

This category is particularly popular in Europe, India, and Brazil, where it accounted for 37, 75, and 69% respectively of total SUV sales in 2018. In the United States, it accounted for 7% of total SUV sales in 2018. The best-selling vehicle in the segment in 2019 was the Honda HR-V, with 622,154 units being recorded as having been sold worldwide.

=== Compact crossover SUV (C-segment) ===
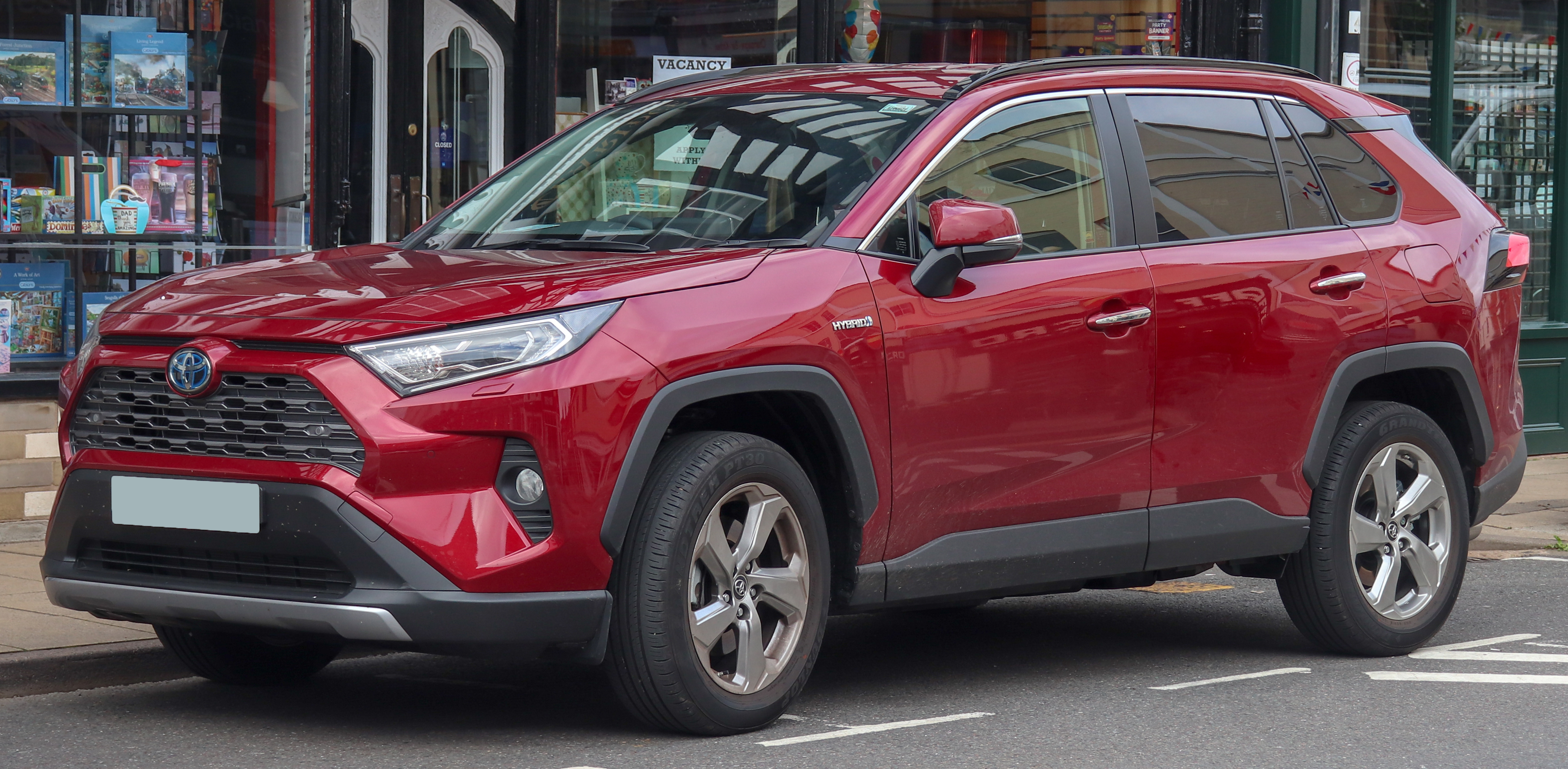
Toyota RAV4, the first modern crossover ever made

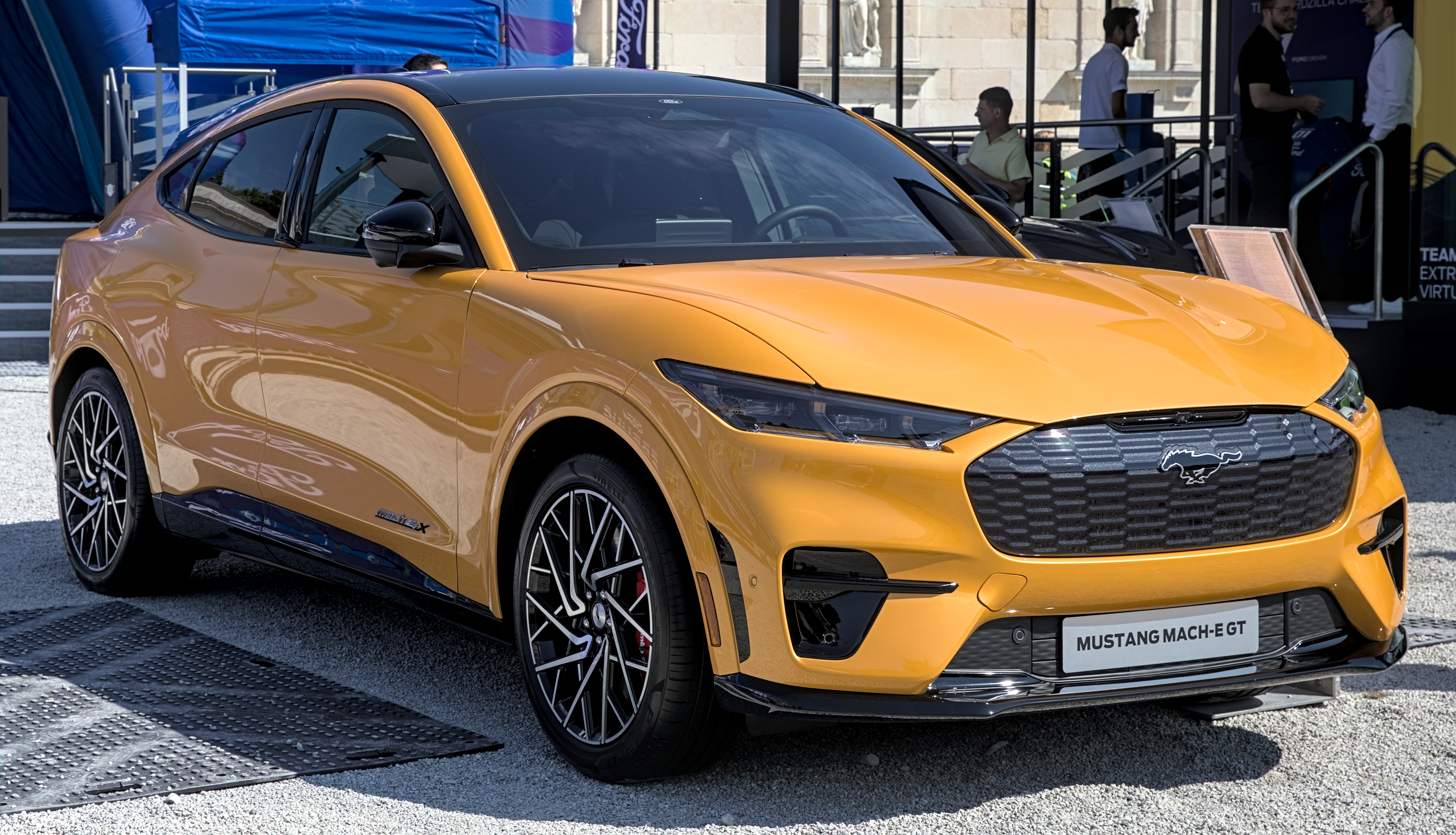
Ford Mustang Mach-E, compact battery electric crossover

A compact crossover SUV (also called C-segment SUV or C-SUV) is a vehicle that is usually based on the platform of a compact car (C-segment), while some models are based on a mid-size car (D-segment) or a subcompact (B-segment) platform. Most compact crossovers have two-row seating, but some have three rows.

The naming of the segment may differ depending on the market. In several regions outside North America, the category may be known as "mid-size crossover" or "mid-size SUV", not to be confused with the North American definition of a mid-size crossover SUV, which is a larger D-segment crossover SUV.

The first compact crossover was the 1980 AMC Eagle that was based on the compact-sized Concord line. Its four-wheel drive system was an almost unheard-of feature on regular passenger cars at the time, and it came with full-time all-wheel drive, automatic transmission, power steering, power front disk brakes as standard, and numerous convenience and comfort options. Later models included the 1994 Toyota RAV4, 1995 Honda CR-V, 1997 Subaru Forester, 2000 Nissan X-Trail, 2000 Mazda Tribute, and the 2001 Ford Escape.

Between 2005 and 2010, the market share of compact crossovers in the US increased from 6 to more than 11%. In 2014, for the first time ever, sales of compact crossovers outpaced mid-size sedans in the United States.

In 2019, the American magazine Car and Driver stated that "so many of these vehicles are crowding the marketplace, simply sorting through them can be a daunting task". Due to its popularity and to cater to customers' needs, many manufacturers offer more than one compact crossover, usually in slightly different sizes at different price points.

By the late 2010s, the segment had emerged as the most popular segment in several regions. For example, nearly 1 in every 4 cars (24.2%) sold in the United States in 2019 was a compact crossover. It also comprised 5.6% of the total European car market. The best-selling vehicle in the segment in 2019 was the Toyota RAV4, with 961,918 units sold globally.

In late 2020 the Volkswagen ID.4 and Ford Mustang Mach-E debuted as battery electric compact crossover SUVs.

=== Mid-size crossover SUV (D/E-segment) ===
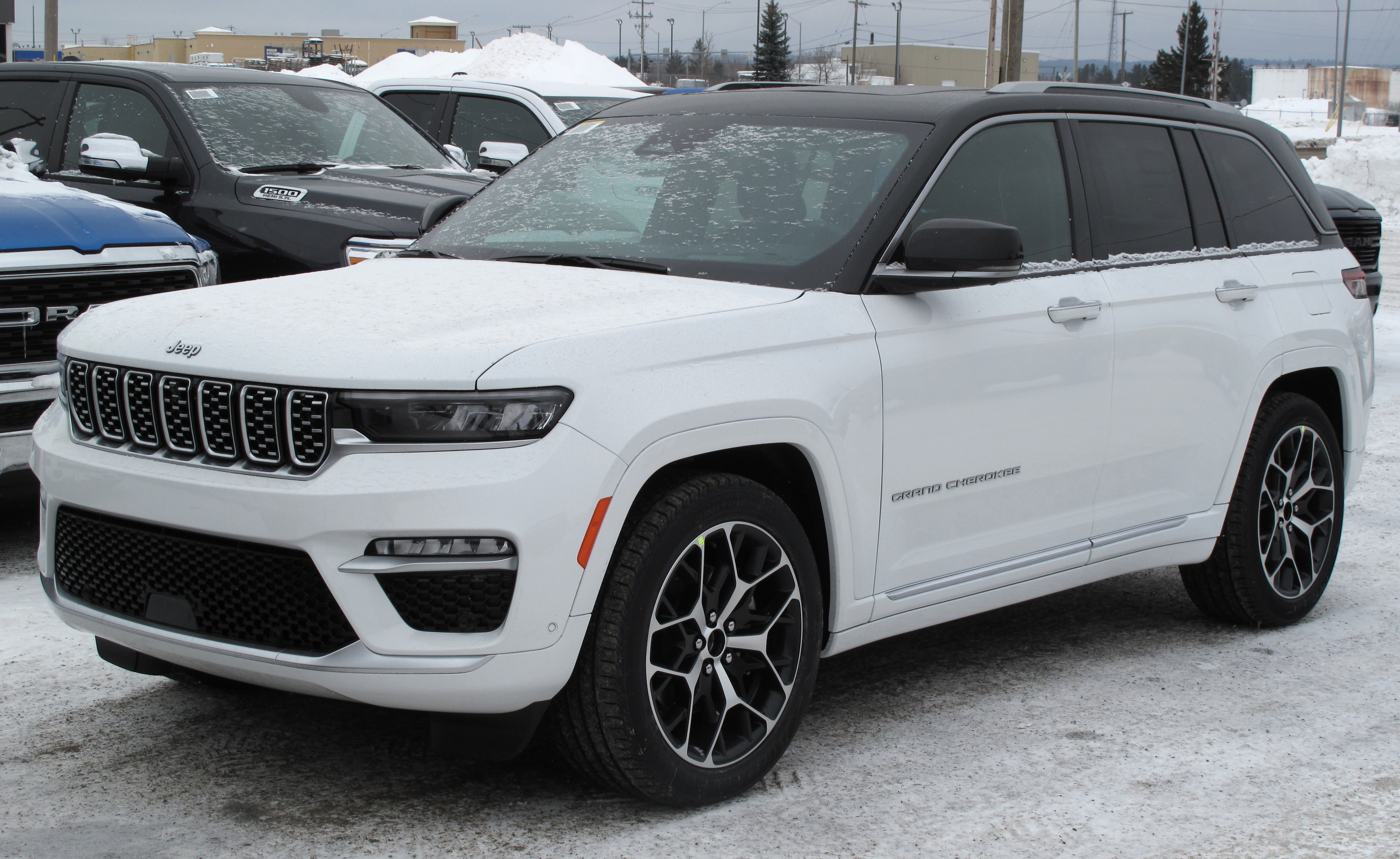
Jeep Grand Cherokee, a mid-size crossover, that from 2021, has a 7-seat extended option

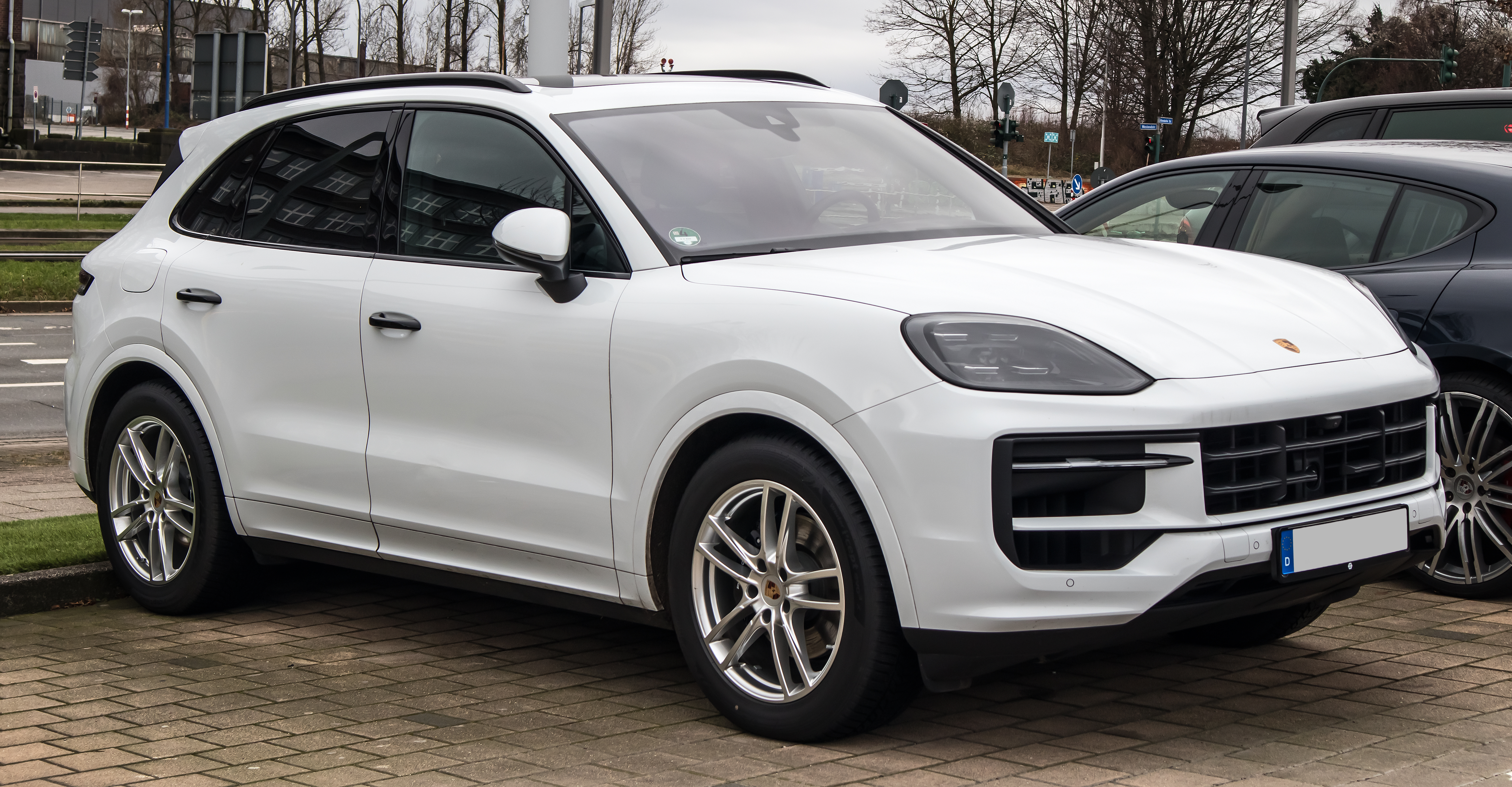
Porsche Cayenne, a mid-size luxury crossover

A mid-size crossover SUV is a class of crossover SUVs that is larger than compact crossover SUVs, but smaller than full-size crossover SUVs. Mid-size crossover SUVs are usually based on the platform of a mid-size (also known as a large family car or a D-segment) passenger car, while some models are based on a full-size car (F-segment) or a compact (C-segment) platform. Some mid-size crossovers have three rows of seats, while others have two rows, which led to several brands offering multiple models to cater to both sub-segments (for example, the Honda Pilot three row crossover and its two row derivative, the Honda Passport). In Australia, American mid-sized crossovers are classified as large SUVs.

The first mid-size crossovers included the Toyota Highlander and Pontiac Aztek, both introduced in 2000 for the 2001 model year.

The segment is most popular in North America and China, where larger vehicles are preferred. It makes up 15.8% of the total United States car market. In Europe, the segment covers 2.1% of the total market in 2019 with luxury crossover SUVs dominating most of the share.

The Toyota Highlander/Kluger was the best-selling vehicle in the category in 2018, with 387,869 sold worldwide.

=== Full-size crossover SUV ===
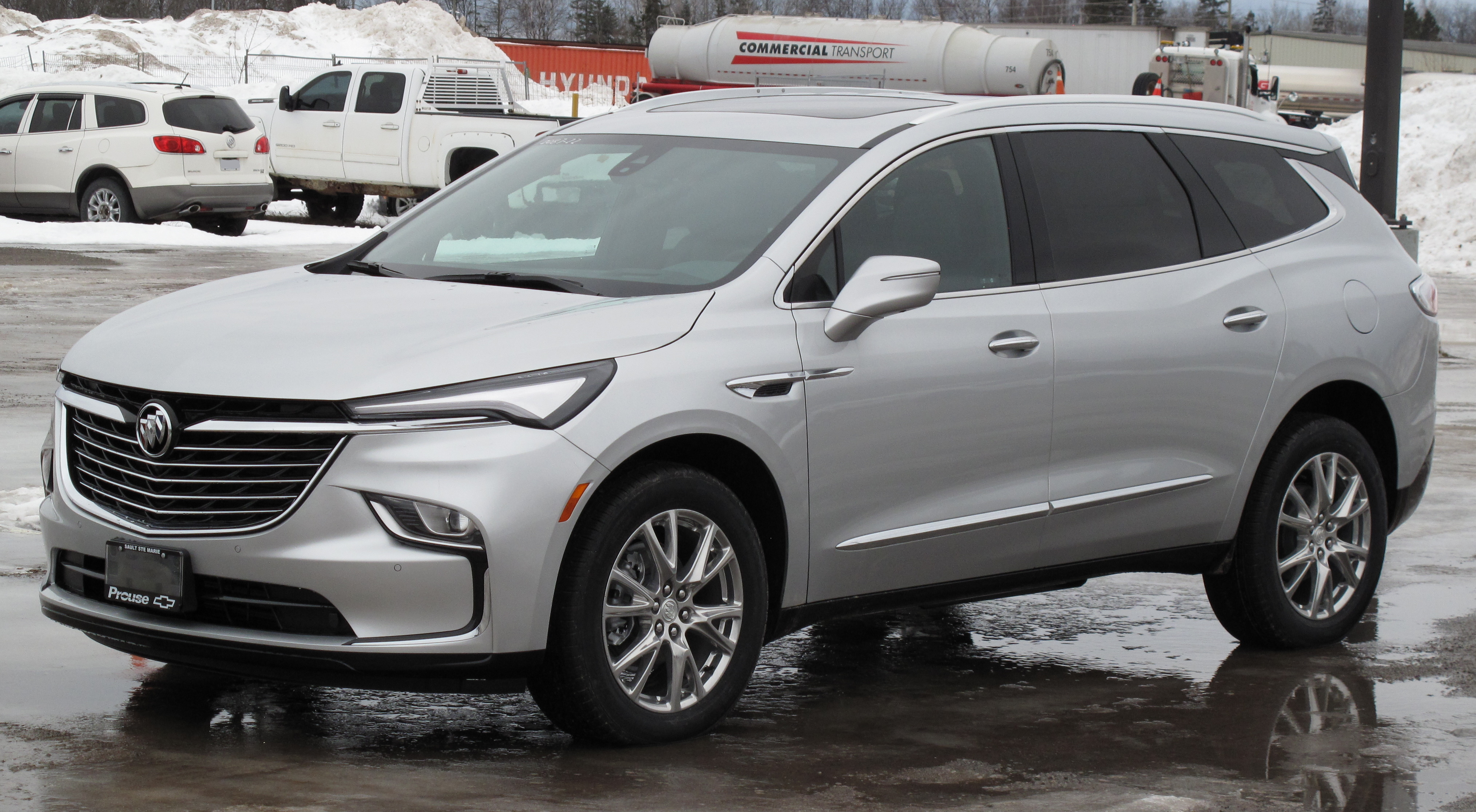
Buick Enclave, full-size crossover

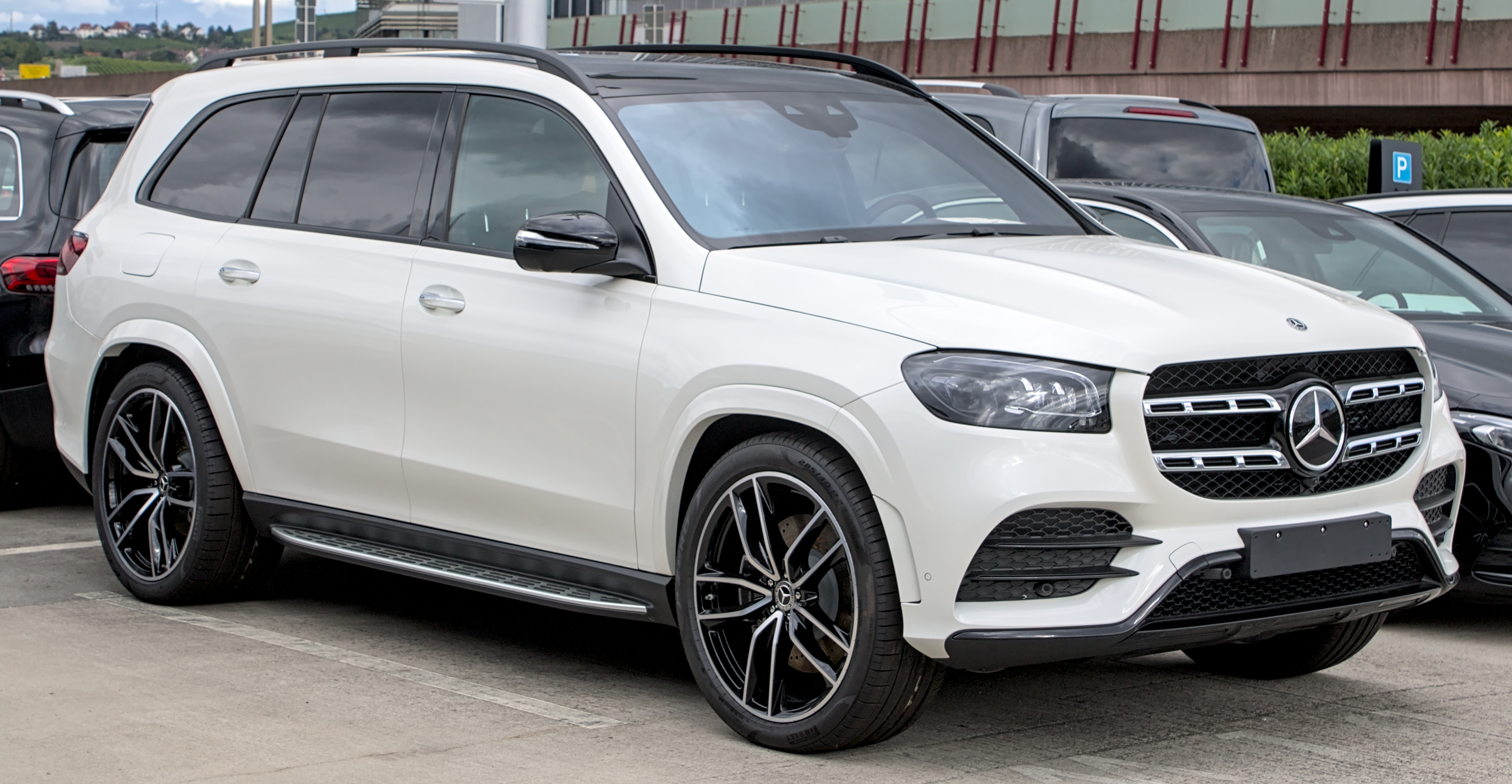
Mercedes-Benz GLS full-size luxury crossover

Full-size crossover SUVs are the largest crossovers and offer exclusively three row seating. The first full-size crossovers included the Ford Freestyle, GMC Acadia, Saturn Outlook, and the Buick Enclave, with older full-size SUVs being built mostly above a body-on-frame chassis. The full-size crossover SUV class is sometimes considered to include the three-row mid-size crossover class, as in the case of the Jeep Grand Cherokee L.

Full-size crossover SUVs are not necessarily based on full-size cars, even if an automaker still has a full-size passenger car in their lineup. For instance the Mercedes-Benz GLS shares its architecture with the mid-size Mercedes-Benz GLE and not the full-size Mercedes-Benz S-Class sedan, even though the GLS is marketed as the crossover SUV counterpart to the S-Class.

== Body style categories ==
=== Three-door crossover ===
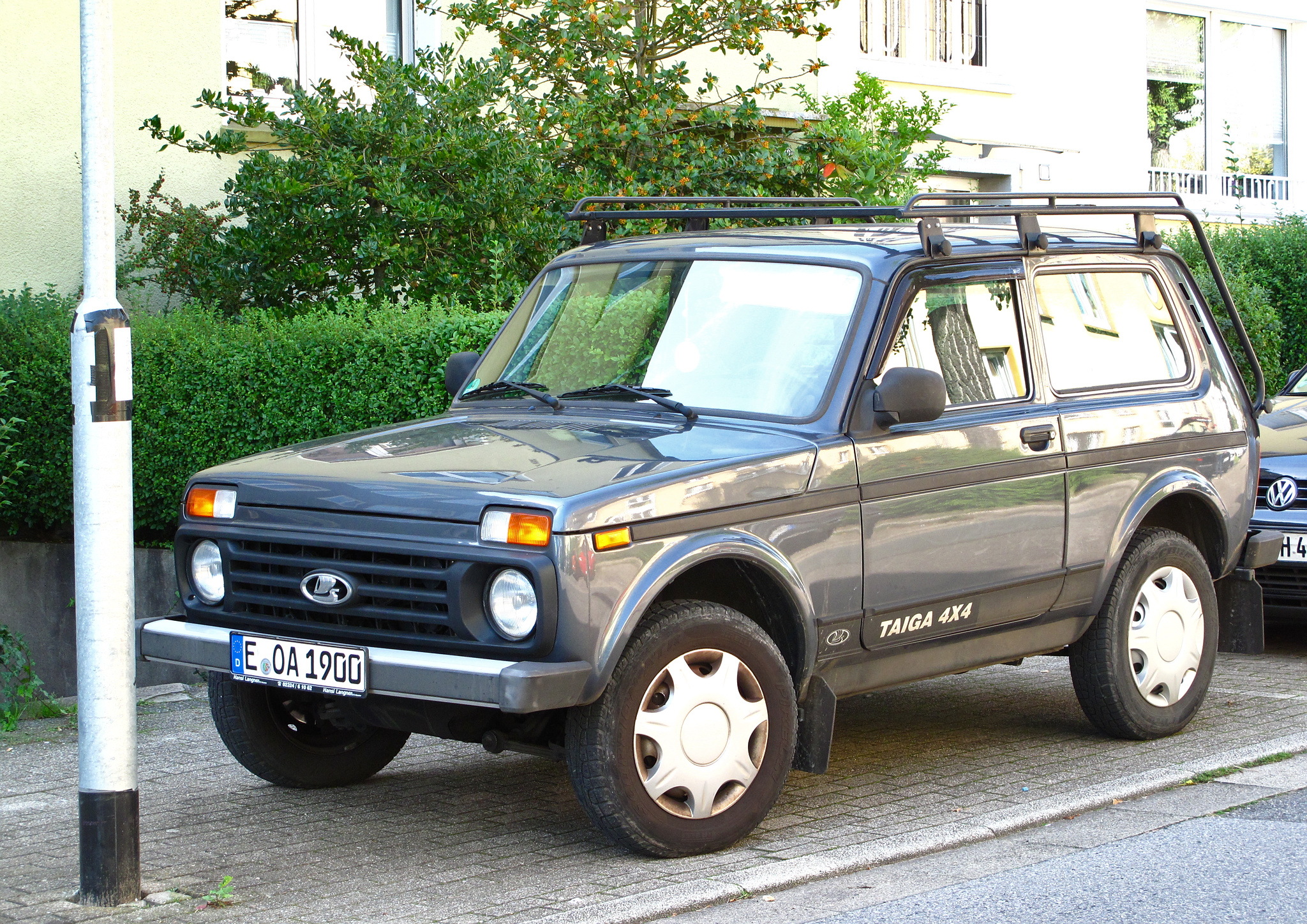
The Lada Niva three-door is one of only a few three-door crossovers still in production.

While three-door body-on-frame SUVs are not uncommon, crossover SUVs with three doors (including the tailgate door) are less prevalent. The decline of two or three-door vehicles, in general, has led to the decline of this category.

=== Coupe crossover ===
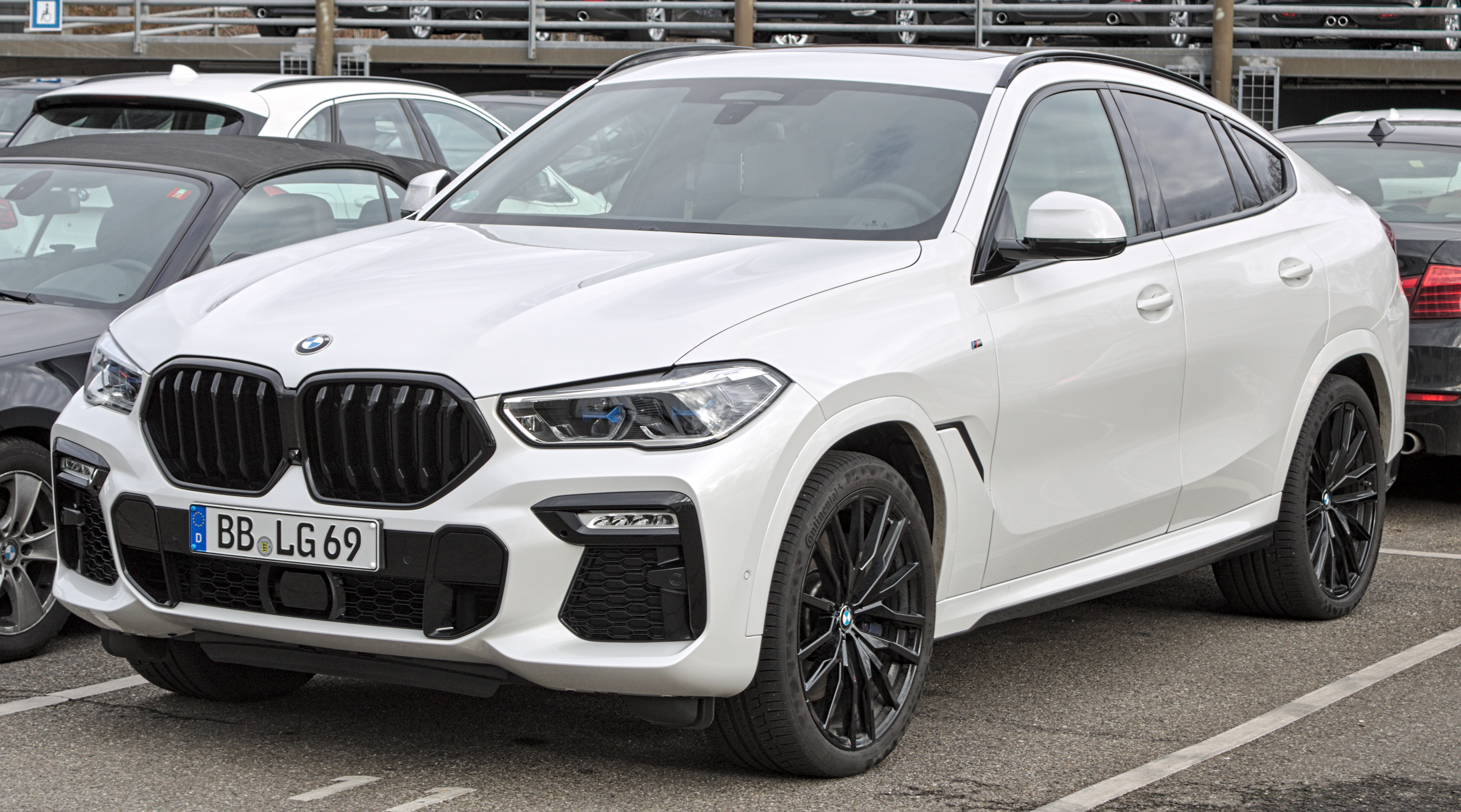
BMW X6 mid-size luxury coupé crossover

Crossover SUVs with a sloping rear roofline may be marketed as a "coupe crossover SUV" or "coupe SUV". Although the term "coupe" itself is supposed to refer to a passenger car with a sloping or truncated rear roofline and usually two doors (although some manufacturers have created a four-door coupé), most coupé crossover SUVs are equipped with five doors. The sloping roofline is designed to offer a styling advantage over its standard crossover counterpart, although others suggest that this is less attractive. The body style has attracted criticism as being more expensive and less practical than normal crossovers. The BMW X6 is credited to be the first coupe crossover.

=== Convertible crossover ===
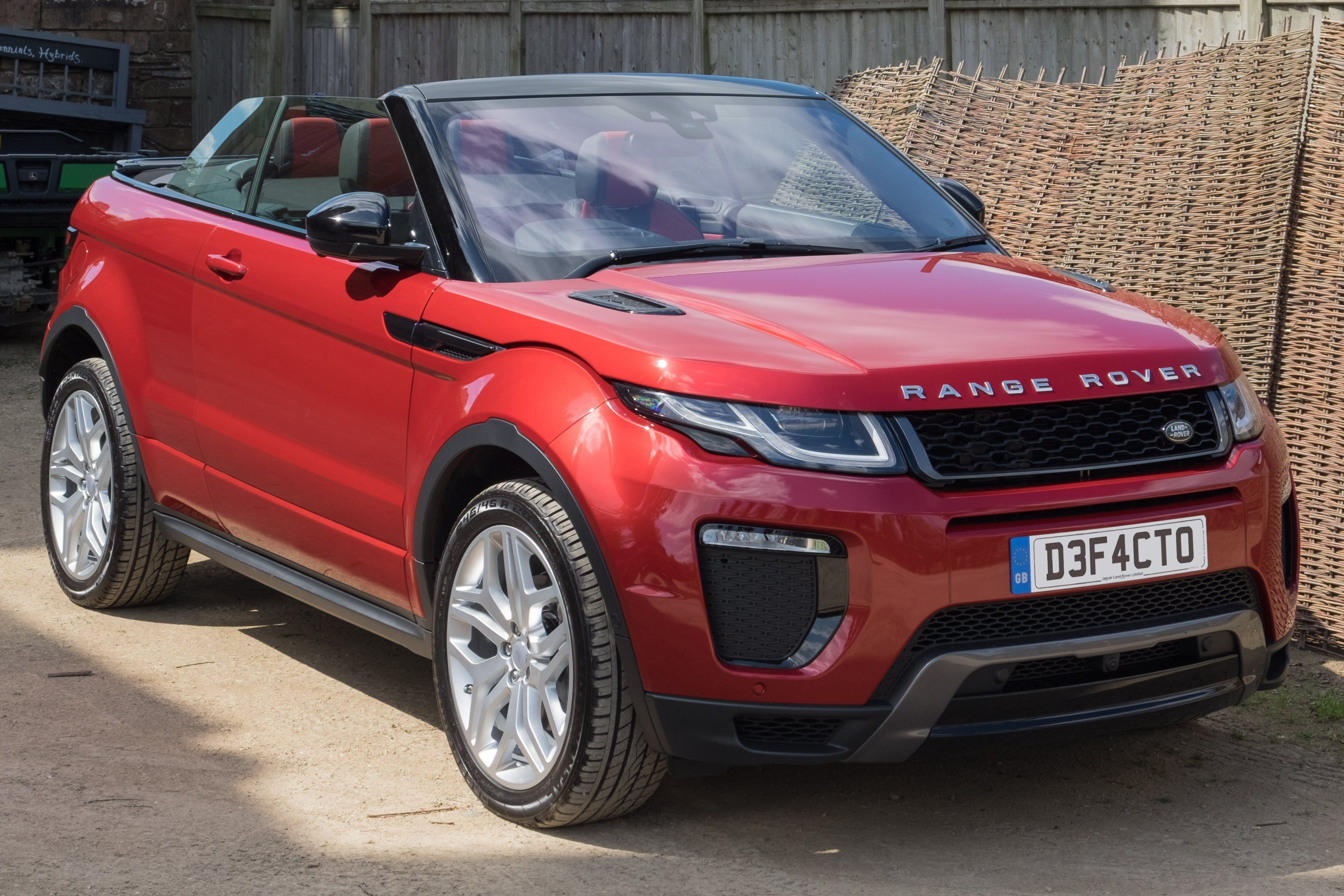
Range Rover Evoque Convertible

The first crossover convertible was the AMC Eagle marketed by AMC dealers during the 1981 and 1982 model years as the Sundancer, a factory-authorized conversion of the all-wheel-drive two-door sedans.

Several convertible crossover SUVs have entered mass production, including the Toyota RAV4 convertible. Released in North America in the 1998 model year, it was offered through the 1999 model year. Other examples include the Nissan Murano CrossCabriolet, Range Rover Evoque Convertible, and Volkswagen T-Roc Cabriolet.

This category was heavily criticized by journalists, enthusiasts, and analysts for numerous reasons, such as its design and high price tag. Some also questioned its purpose, as the practicality that crossovers usually have did not carryover to the convertible version, since it could only have two doors and little luggage space.

== Crossover-styled cars ==
Many manufacturers have capitalized on the SUV trend by offering a version of station wagons, hatchbacks, or MPVs with a raised ride height and the addition of rugged-looking accessories such as a black plastic wheel arch extension kit, body cladding, skid plates, and roof rails. Due to their raised ground clearance, these vehicles may then be marketed as more capable off-road. Some of them may also be equipped with an all-wheel-drive. This strategy has been used by manufacturers to move models upmarket or to help fill an absence in a crossover SUV segment. These vehicles have been described as pseudo-crossovers.

=== Station wagon ===
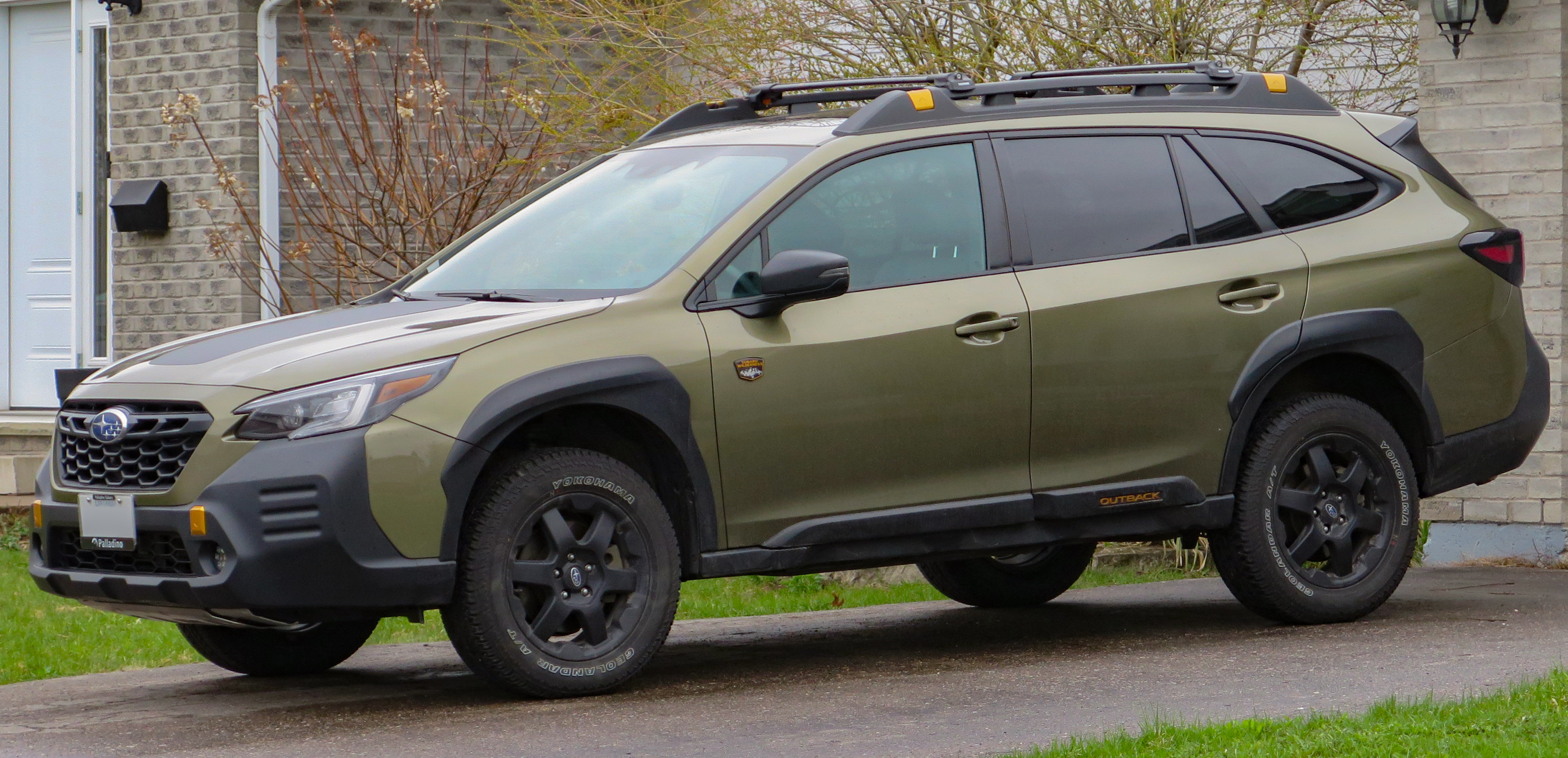
Subaru Outback, mainly based on the Legacy station wagon.

Many manufacturers have released "off-road" versions of station wagons, with larger cargo space and greater practicality, that are marketed as more capable in soft off-road or all-weather situations due to their raised ground clearance, making them a "crossover" between a station wagon and an SUV. In North America, some manufacturers sell station wagons with crossover styling due to the former's unpopularity, the Subaru Outback being the most popular model.

An early model of off-road-styled station wagons was the Subaru Legacy Outback (later Outback) in 1994. At the time, Subaru was absent in the growing SUV segment. Lacking the finances to design a ground-up SUV, Subaru added a two-tone paint scheme, body cladding, and a suspension lift to the Legacy wagon. It was marketed as a capable and more efficient alternative to larger truck-based SUVs. Another example is the Volvo V70 XC (also called V70 Cross Country), first introduced in 1999. In 2002, the model was renamed the XC70. Audi has been making Allroad versions of their station wagons since 1999. The Volkswagen Alltrack and Škoda Scout are equivalent variants.

=== Hatchback ===
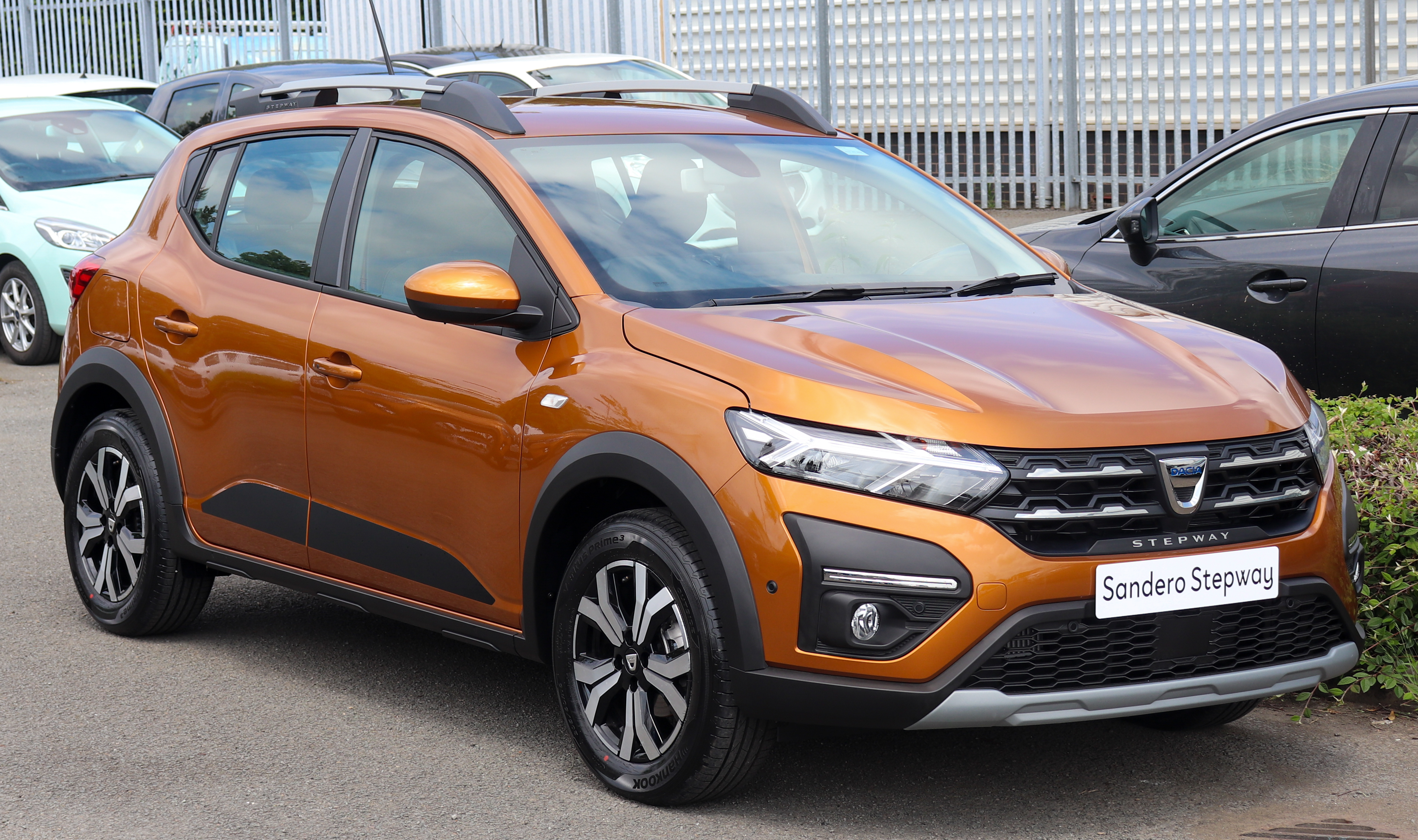
Dacia Sandero Stepway supermini/subcompact hatchback (B-segment)

The crossover-styled variant of hatchbacks or city cars with the same body was introduced either as a substitute for or a complement to the subcompact crossover SUV. Most crossover-styled hatchbacks do not have all-wheel-drive. Forerunners of the SUV-themed hatchback are the 1983 Fiat Panda 4x4, the 1994 Outback Sport, the 1996 Toyota Starlet Remix, and the 2003 Rover Streetwise. The Volkswagen Golf Country, a conversion by Steyr-Daimler-Puch, was also sold between 1990 and 1991, and was offered with part-time four-wheel drive and off-road exterior cladding. In the 2000s, the Volkswagen CrossPolo started the modern crossover-style hatchback trend and was marketed as an SUV-like "lifestyle" vehicle. The Dacia/Renault Sandero Stepway, the crossover-style version of the Sandero launched in 2009, is an example of a well-received crossover-style hatchback, making up 65% of Sandero sales.

=== MPV/minivan ===
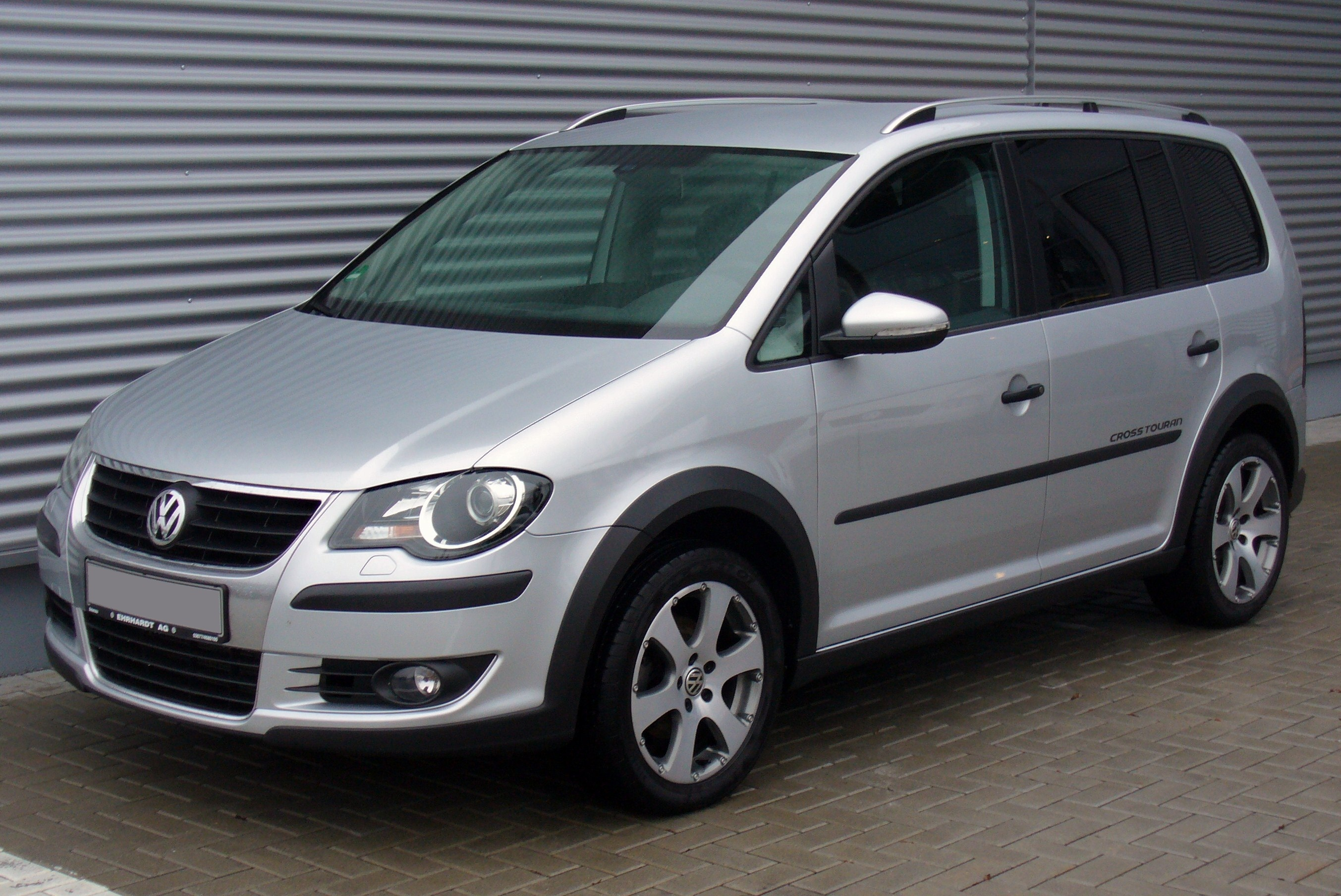
Volkswagen CrossTouran

One of the first MPVs with a crossover-style variant was the Renault Scénic RX4, introduced in 2000. It featured a lifted ride height, rugged body cladding, tailgate-mounted spare wheel, and optional part-time four-wheel-drive. Another example is the Volkswagen CrossTouran, launched in 2006 as a lifted version of the Touran and marketed as a "lifestyle" vehicle. Apart from crossover-style variants equipped with exterior accessories, due to the increasing crossover market shares, many manufacturers began developing MPVs from the ground up with crossover characteristics – and often marketed them either purely as an MPV or as a "crossover MPV" – such as the 5th generation of Renault Espace.

=== Sedan ===
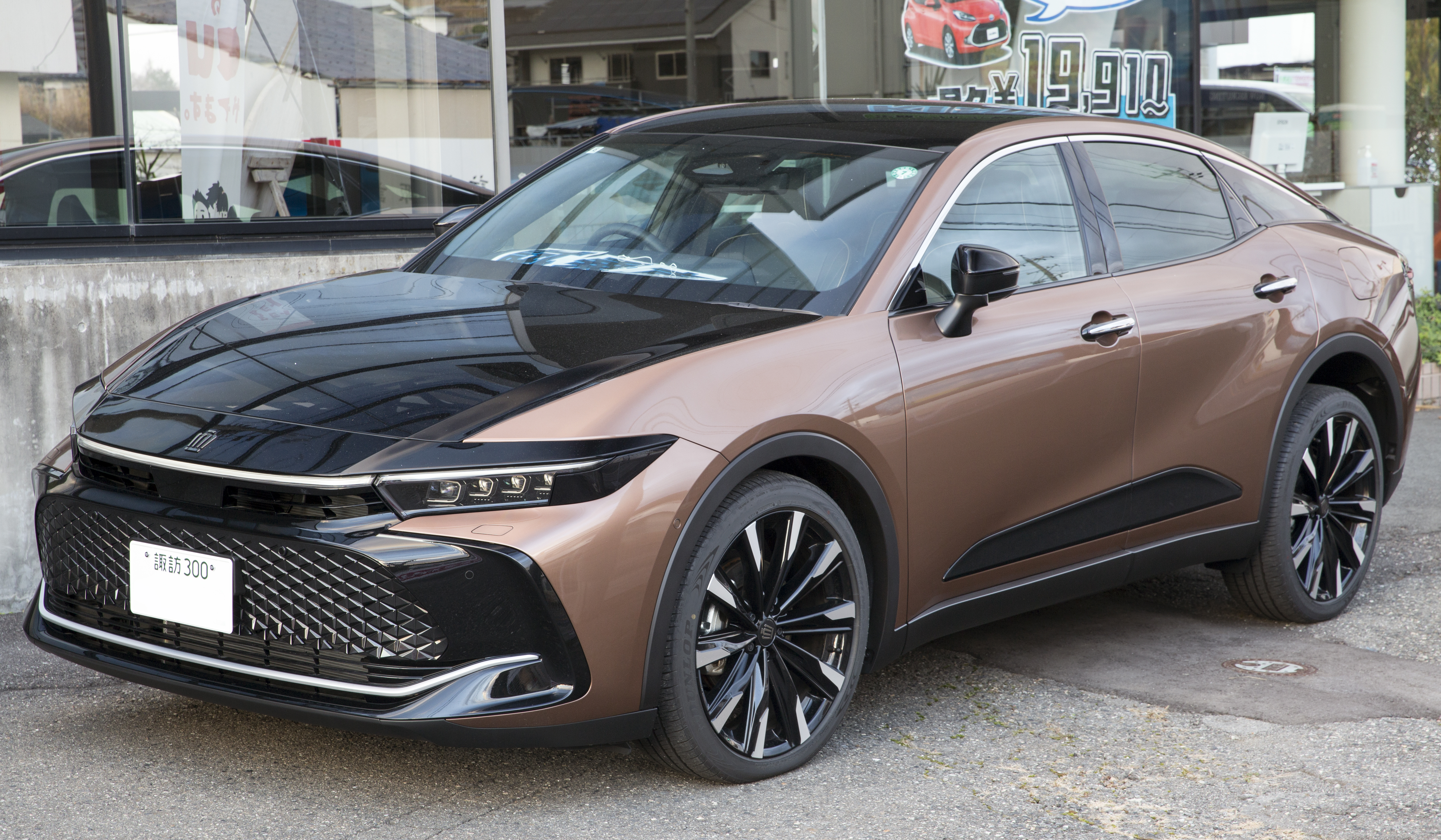
Toyota Crown Crossover

The innovative unibody all-wheel drive AMC Eagle was available in two- and four-door sedan versions when introduced in 1979.

Some examples of sedans with crossover characteristics are the Subaru Legacy SUS (short for "Sport Utility Sedan"), Volvo S60 Cross Country, Polestar 2, Toyota Crown Crossover, Citroën C4 X and C3L in China, Renault/Dacia Logan Stepway and the Qoros 3 GT.

== Sales ==
=== Europe ===
Since the early 2010s, sales of crossover-type vehicles have been increasing in Europe. By 2017, European sales of compact and mid-sized crossover models continued to surge. Analysis of the European new car market by data firm JATO Dynamics reveals that SUVs which mostly consisted of crossovers took almost 40% of the market in 2019, with the crossover segment being a key driver of growth for volume and profits.

=== United States ===
Sales of crossovers increased by 30% between 2003 and 2005. By 2006, the segment came into strong visibility in the U.S., when crossover sales "made up more than 50% of the overall SUV market". Sales increased in 2007 by 16%. In 2013, the Audi Q5 became Audi's second best-selling vehicle in the United States market after the Audi A4 sedan. Between the late 1990s and 2012, around half of Lexus's sales came from its SUVs.

American manufacturers were initially slow to switch from their emphasis on light truck-based SUVs, and foreign automakers developed crossovers targeting the U.S. market as an alternative to station wagons that were unpopular there. By the early 2000s, American car manufacturers had caught up.

=== China ===
The crossover segment has been the fastest-growing category in China's passenger car market since the early 2010s. From 2011 to 2021, the market share of crossovers in China's passenger vehicle sales surged by nearly 35 percentage points, rising from approximately 13% in 2011 to 47.89% in 2021. A 2017 survey by Mintel indicated that Chinese consumers were willing to pay a premium for SUVs, with the median first-time buyer spending RMB 205,000.

By 2023, several crossover models dominated the list of overall best-selling vehicles in China. The Tesla Model Y emerged as the best-selling car across all segments. Other popular crossover models included the BYD Song Plus and Yuan Plus, which ranked 4th and 5th respectively, and the Haval H6, which took the 10th spot. In 2023, Land Rover experienced significant growth in the Chinese market. Combined sales of the Range Rover and Range Rover Sport surpassed 25,000 units, representing a 31% year-over-year increase, whilst sales of the Land Rover Discovery grew by 14% year-over-year.

== List ==
See Category:Crossover sport utility vehicles ( 78 )

== See also ==
- Car classification
- List of sport utility vehicles
- Mini SUV
- Minivan
- Recreational vehicle
