= Exter (surname) =

Exter is a German surname. Notable people with the surname include:

- Aleksandra Ekster (1882–1949), Russian-Ukrainian painter
- Joe Exter (born 1978), American ice hockey goaltender
- John Exter (1910–2006), American economist
- Julius Exter (1863–1939), German avant-garde painter

== See also ==
- Ekster
