= Hyundai Santro =

City car

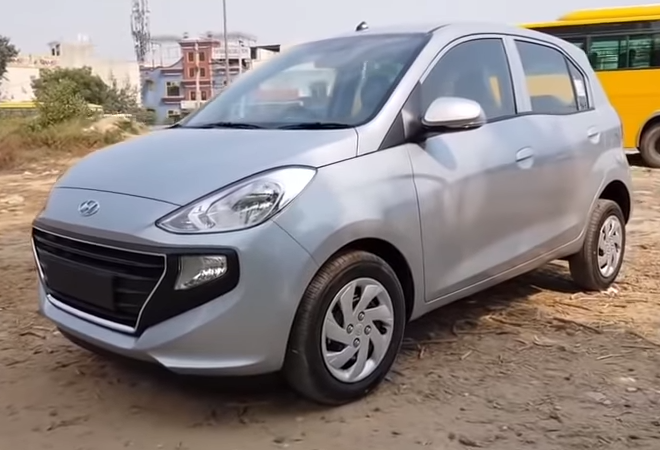

Overview
- Manufacturer: Hyundai
- Also called: Hyundai Atos
- Production: 1998–2015; 2018–2022

Body and chassis
- Class: City car (A)
- Body style: 5-door hatchback
- Layout: Front-engine, front-wheel-drive

Chronology
- Predecessor: Hyundai Santro/Santro Xing; Hyundai Eon
- Successor: Hyundai Grand i10 NIOS

The Hyundai Santro is a city car produced by the South Korean manufacturer Hyundai between 1998 and 2014. The nameplate was revived in 2018 to replace the Eon, and was produced until 2022. The "Santro" nameplate was applied during its first generation to the Atos Prime model, while the second generation is a standalone model.

Hyundai derived the name Santro for the Indian market from Saint-Tropez, a French city famous for fashion, because the company wanted to project it as a ‘fashionable’ car.

== First generation (MX; 1998) ==
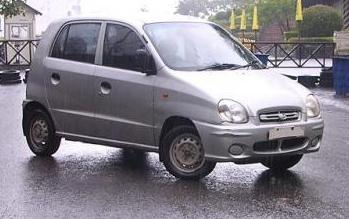
2001 Hyundai Santro (MX; 1998–2003)

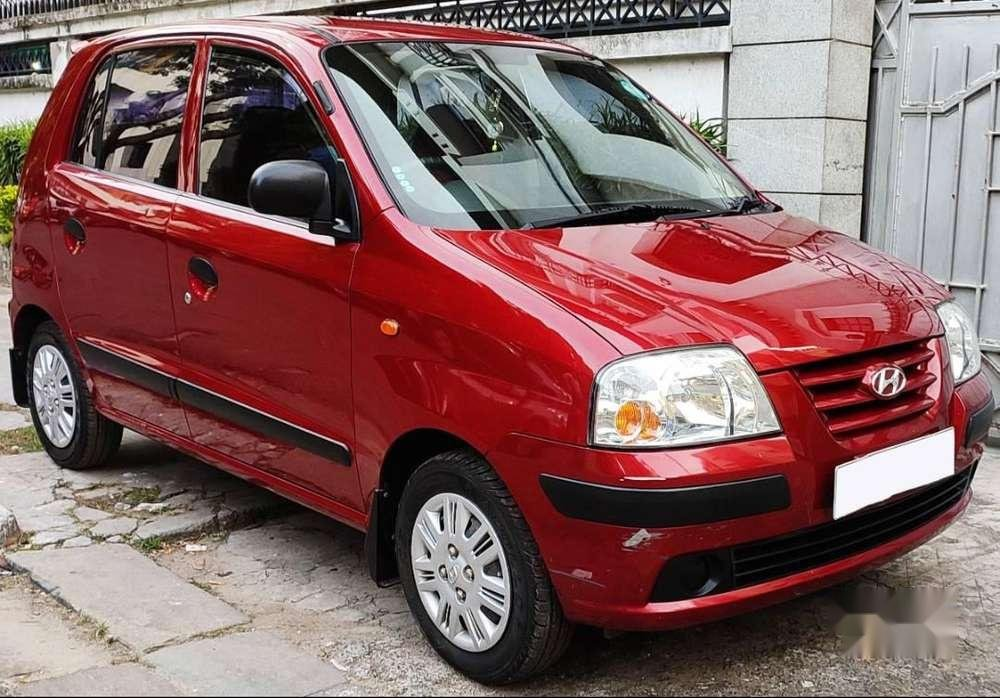
Hyundai Santro Xing (2003–2015)

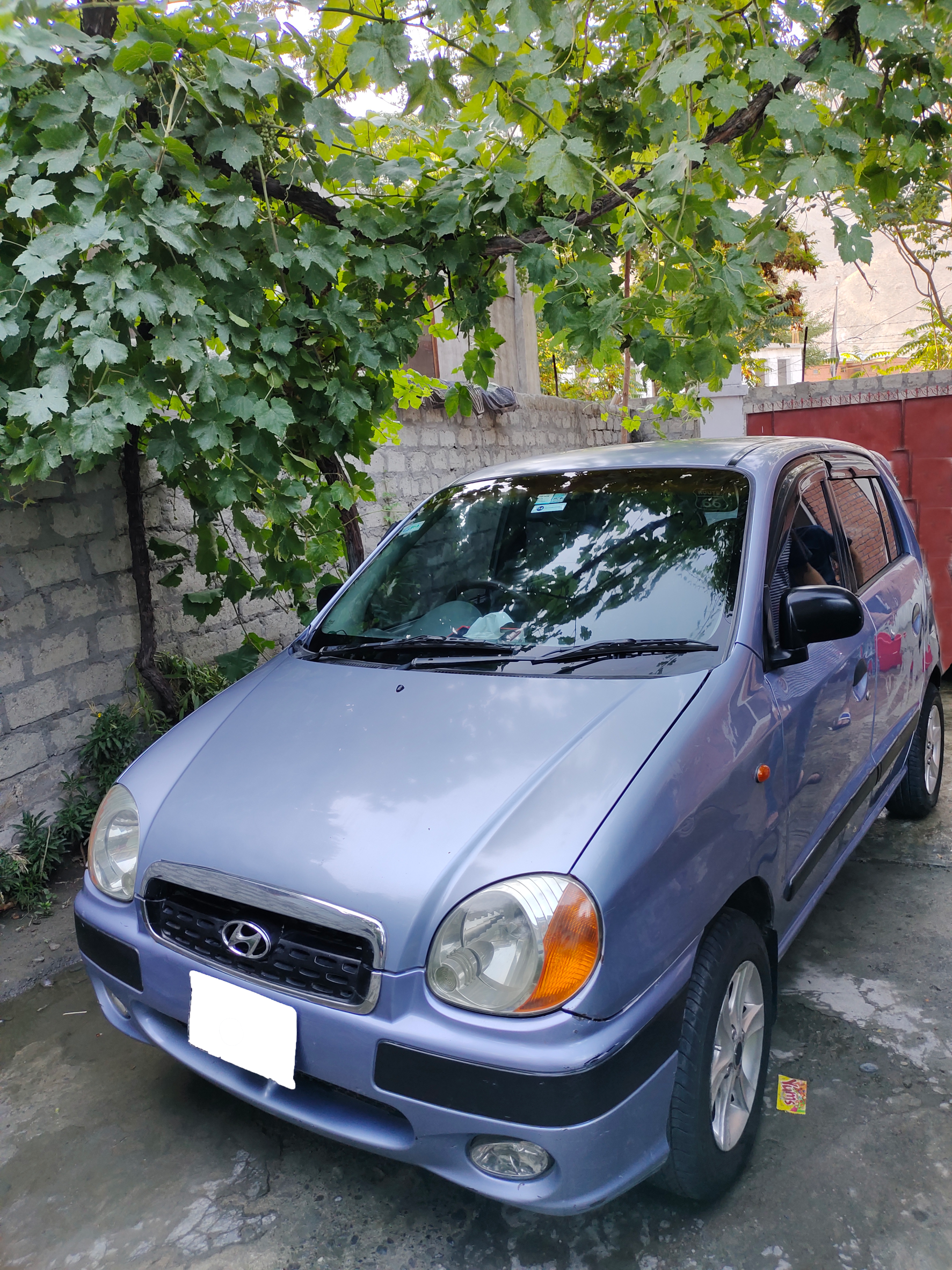
A blue 2004 Hyundai Santro in Pakistan

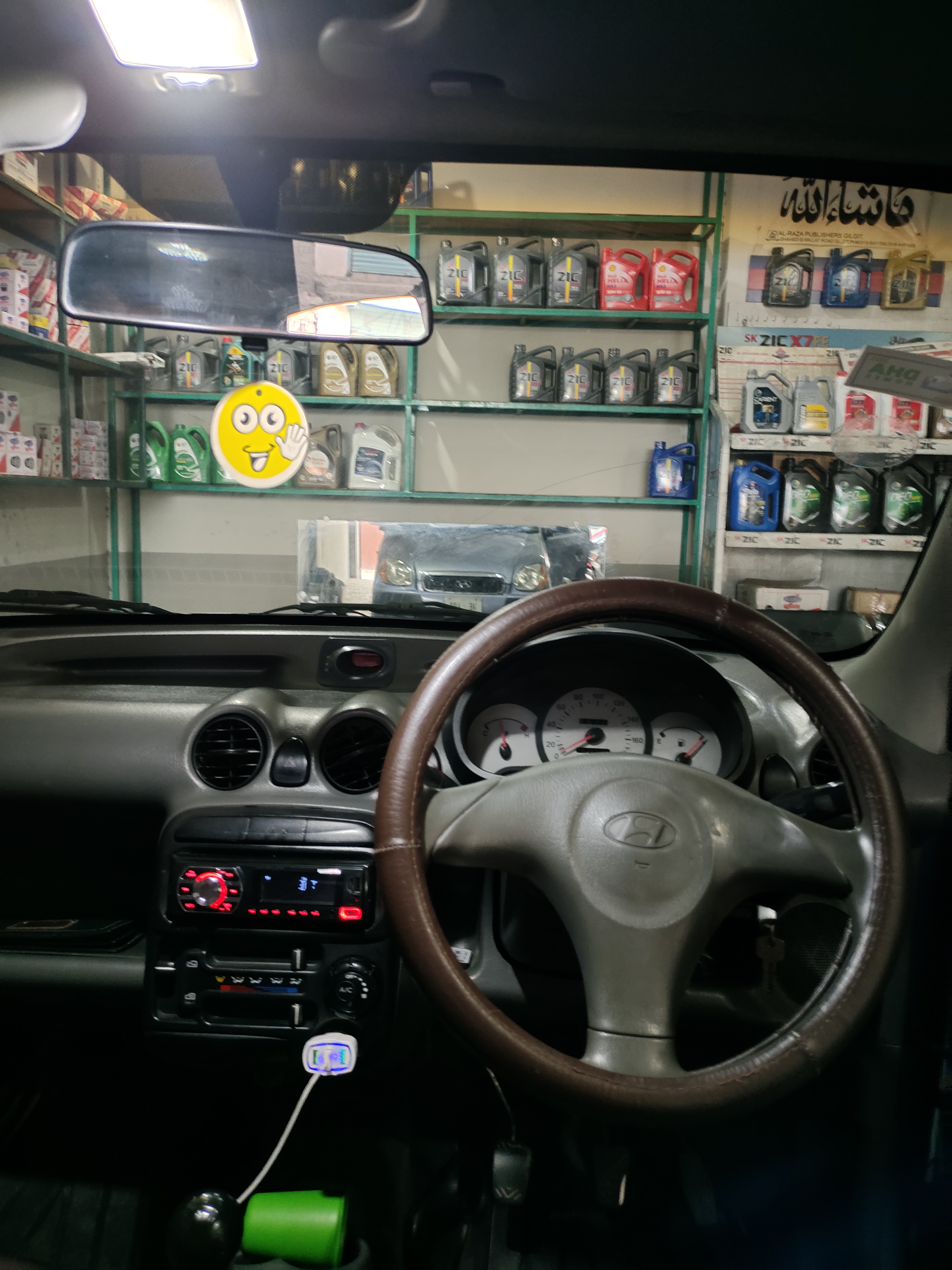
Hyundai Santro 2004 interior

The first generation Santro was introduced in 1998 and went on sale in early 1999. It was also sold in Europe as the Atos Prime and in South Korea and Indonesia as the Kia Visto. It was also known as the Santro Zip in India from 1998 to 2006.

Before the Kia Visto was replaced by the Kia Picanto in 2004, the facelifted Santro was launched in 2003. It was known as the Santro Xing in India from 2003 to 2014.

== Second generation (AH2; 2018) ==
Second generation (AH2)
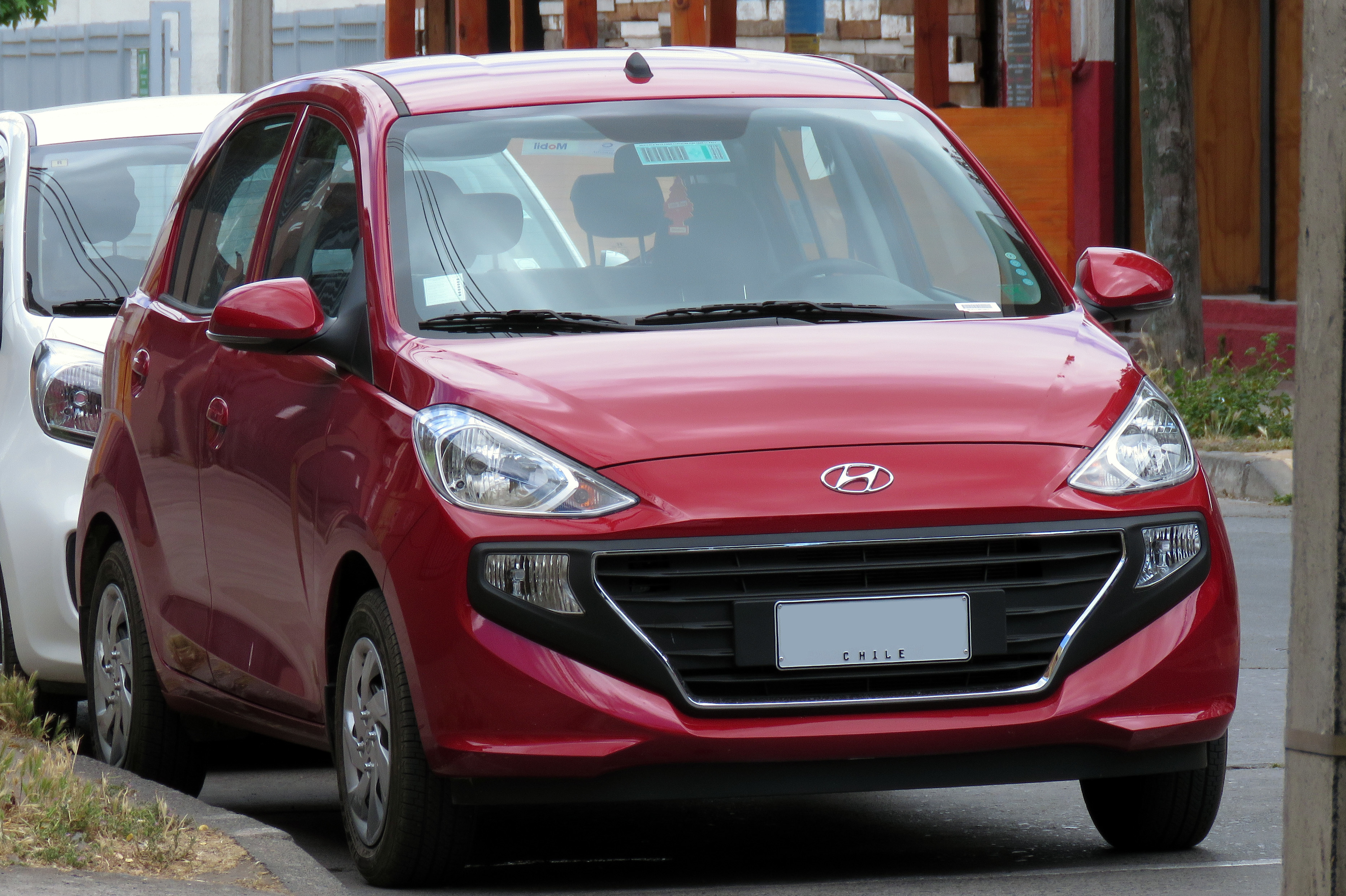
- Hyundai Atos 1.1 Plus (Chile)

Overview
- Also called: Hyundai Atos
- Production: 2018–2022
- Assembly: India: Chennai (Hyundai India)

Body and chassis
- Platform: Hyundai-Kia K1
- Related: Hyundai Grand i10 (AI3)

Powertrain
- Engine: Petrol: 1.1 L Epsilon I4; Petrol/CNG: 1.1 L Epsilon I4
- Transmission: 5-speed manual; 5-speed automated manual

Dimensions
- Wheelbase: 2,400 mm (94.5 in)
- Length: 3,610 mm (142.1 in)
- Width: 1,645 mm (64.8 in)
- Height: 1,560 mm (61.4 in)

Chronology
- Predecessor: Hyundai Eon
- Successor: Hyundai Grand i10 NIOS

The second generation Santro was launched on 23 October 2018 in India. This marked the return of the Santro nameplate in India after four years since the last generation was discontinued and nearly twenty-five years since the start of production. It was positioned below the Hyundai i10.

The model was powered by a 1.1-litre Epsilon G4HG petrol which produces 69 hp (51 kW; 70 PS) at 5,500 rpm and 10.1 kg⋅m (73 lb⋅ft; 99 N⋅m) torque at 4,500 rpm. A bi-fuel version of the engine that uses both petrol and CNG is also available. Transmission options consisted of a 5-speed manual and a 5-speed automated manual.

It was one of the Top 3 Urban World Cars of 2019.

The second generation Santro was discontinued in 2022.

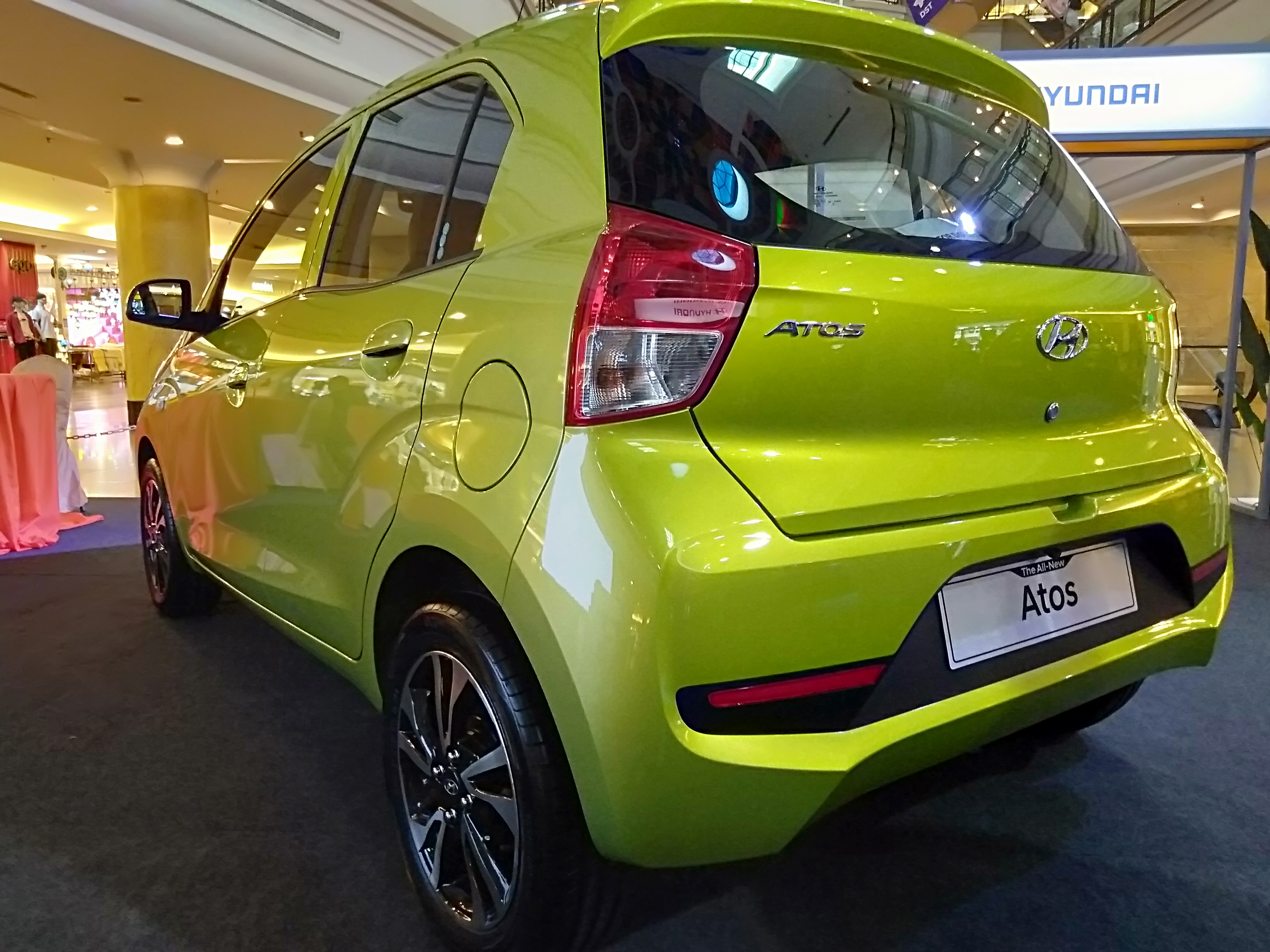
2020 Hyundai Atos (Brunei)

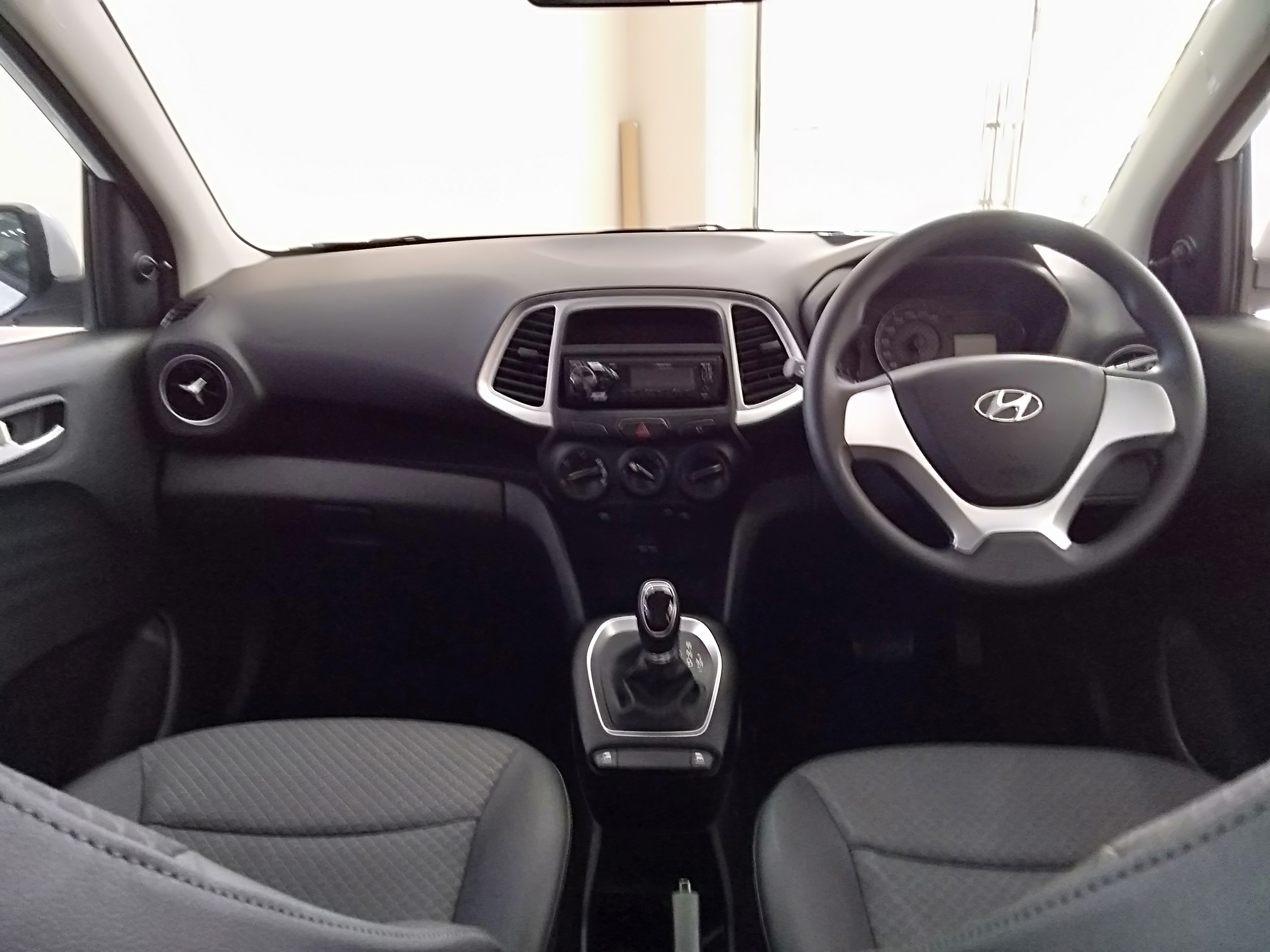
Interior (RHD)

=== Safety ===
The Indian version of the Santro with driver airbag scored 2 stars for adult and child occupant protection in the Global NCAP 1.0 frontal offset crash tests under its Safer Cars for India project in 2019 (similar to Latin NCAP 2013).

Global NCAP 1.0 test results (India) Hyundai Santro – Driver Airbags (2019, similar to Latin NCAP 2013)
Test	Score	Stars
Adult occupant protection	6.74/17.00	2 /5 stars
Child occupant protection	15.00/49.00	3 /5 stars

Global NCAP 1.0 test results (India) Hyundai Grand i10 Nios – 2 Airbags (2020, similar to Latin NCAP 2013)
Test	Score	Stars
Adult occupant protection	7.05/17.00	2 /5 stars
Child occupant protection	15.00/49.00	2 /5 stars
