= Hyundai Atos =

City car manufactured by Hyundai

Hyundai Atos (FF/MX)
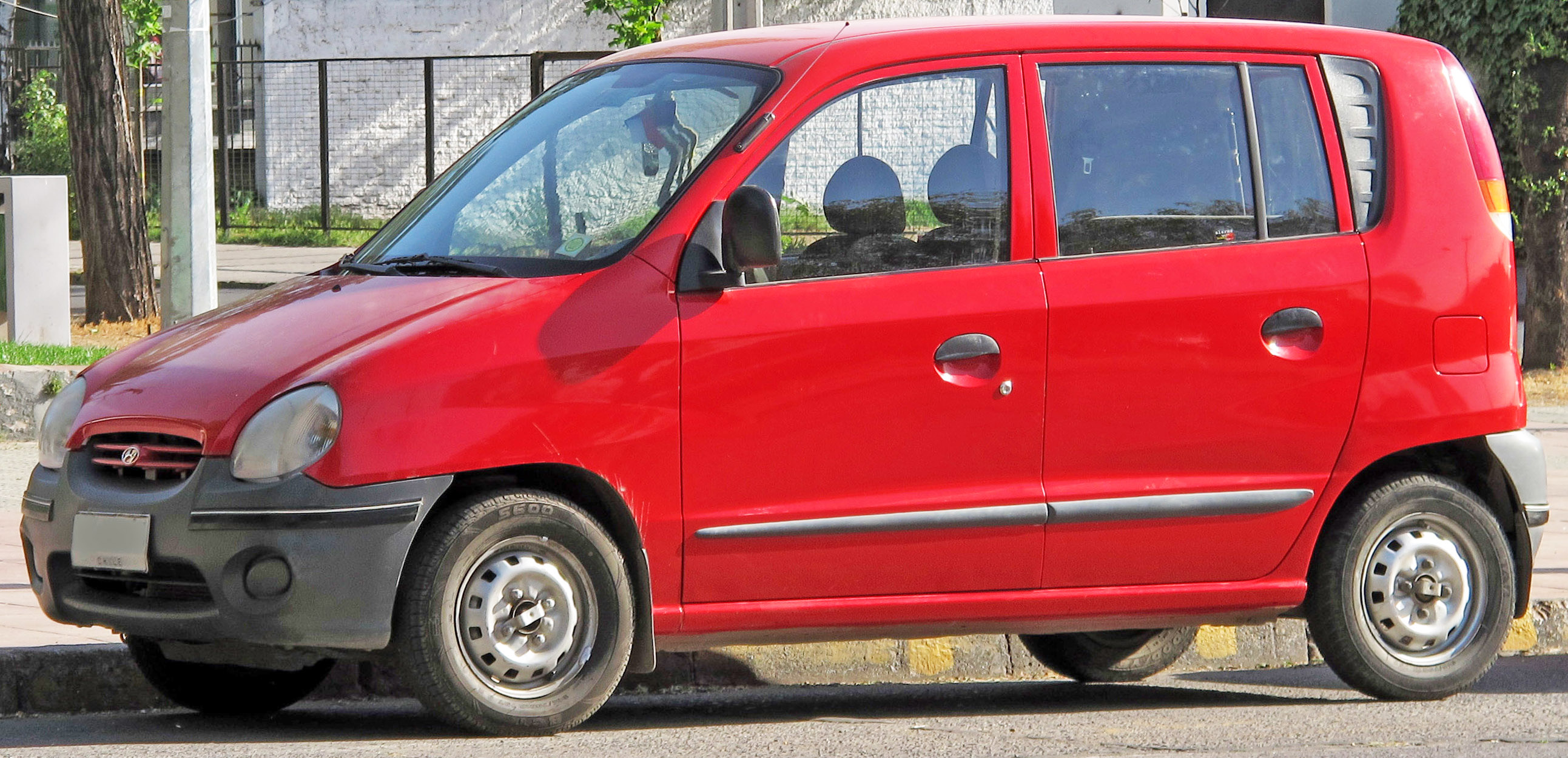
- 2000 Hyundai Atos 1.0 GL (pre-facelift, Chile)

Overview
- Manufacturer: Hyundai
- Also called: Hyundai Amica; Hyundai Atoz (Indonesia and United Kingdom); Hyundai Santro (India and Pakistan); Dodge Atos (Mexico); Inokom Atos (Malaysia); Kia Visto (South Korea, Indonesia, Singapore, Thailand and Philippines)
- Production: 1997–2014; 2018–2022 (for the second generation of Hyundai Santro)
- Assembly: South Korea: Ulsan; India: Chennai (Hyundai India); Malaysia: Kulim (Inokom); Mexico: Campeche (Bering Company); Egypt: Cairo (Ghabbour Group); Pakistan: Sujawal

Body and chassis
- Class: City car (A)
- Body style: 5-door hatchback
- Layout: Front-engine, front-wheel-drive
- Platform: Hyundai-Kia FF
- Related: Kia Picanto; Hyundai Getz

Powertrain
- Engine: 0.8 L Epsilon G4HA I4 (petrol); 1.0 L Epsilon G4HC I4 (petrol); 1.1 L Epsilon G4HG I4 (petrol)
- Transmission: 5-speed manual; 3-speed automatic; 4-speed automatic

Dimensions
- Wheelbase: 2,380 mm (93.7 in)
- Length: 3,495 mm (137.6 in) (1998–2004); 3,565 mm (140.4 in) (2004–2007)
- Width: 1,495 mm (58.9 in) (1998–2004); 1,525 mm (60.0 in) (2004–2007)
- Height: 1,615 mm (63.6 in) (1998–2004); 1,570 mm (61.8 in) (2004–2007)
- Curb weight: 845 kg (1,863 lb)

Chronology
- Successor: Hyundai Eon; Hyundai i10 (for Hyundai Atos); Kia Picanto (for Kia Visto)

The Hyundai Atos (Korean: 현대 아토스) is a city car that was produced by the South Korean manufacturer Hyundai from 1997 until 2014. It was also marketed under the Atoz, Amica and Santro model names. From 1999, the Atos with a different rear fascia and restyled rear side doors is marketed as the Atos Prime and in South Korea and Indonesia as the Kia Visto. It has been available only with a five-door hatchback body style.

It was replaced in most markets by the i10 in 2007, but production continued in India until late 2014. The Santro nameplate, used in India, was revived in October 2018. It was once again discontinued in 2022.

== Overview ==
=== Debut of original Atos ===
The development project for a Hyundai minicar started in October 1995 after the main Korean competitor Daewoo had already put in place the production of a city car, exposing numerous concepts in various international car showrooms that would have foreshadowed the production model (which would become the Matiz designed together with Italdesign Giugiaro). Hyundai produced a concept of a city car which was extremely compact and economical to sell not only in South Korea but also in Europe (market with high sales in the city segment seen the successes of cars such as Fiat Panda, Cinquecento, Renault Twingo and Peugeot 106) and in India. In just 23 months, with a total investment of 155 million dollars, the car passed from the blank sheet to production. In September 1997, Hyundai released it as the Atos, less than 3.50 meters long, characterized by a soft design but a very spacious interior thanks to the shape of the mini-van body, five doors and five seats. At the debut the engine was a four-cylinder petrol 800 cc Epsilon that was approved according to the new restrictive emission standards entered into force in South Korea. For export markets, the Atos adopted a larger 1.0-litre four-cylinder Epsilon engine.

Production in the Ulsan plant started in September 1997. The European version was presented at the International Motor Show Germany in Frankfurt the same month and sales began in March 1998.

Hyundai for the Atos created a specific base platform, very simple in the mechanical and economic setting to produce because the car had to be sold in emerging markets and therefore have a low price list: the front wheel drive scheme was adopted, with MacPherson front suspension, and a torsion-beam suspension at the rear, front disc brakes and rear drum brakes. The design of the Atos is characterized by a front with circular headlights and bumpers in raw plastic, the rear lights are in an upright position near the rear window, and the tailgate is very large to facilitate access to the luggage compartment.

The Atos was one of the first compact city cars (A-segment) to be sold in Europe with the five-door body. The trunk has a volume of 263 liters that rises to 1064 liters by breaking down the back sofa. The dashboard had a simple design, with a large shelf in the dashboard in front of the passenger side and two central vents with the levator climate controls. Safety devices (driver and front passenger airbags and ABS) were paid or standard only on top models.

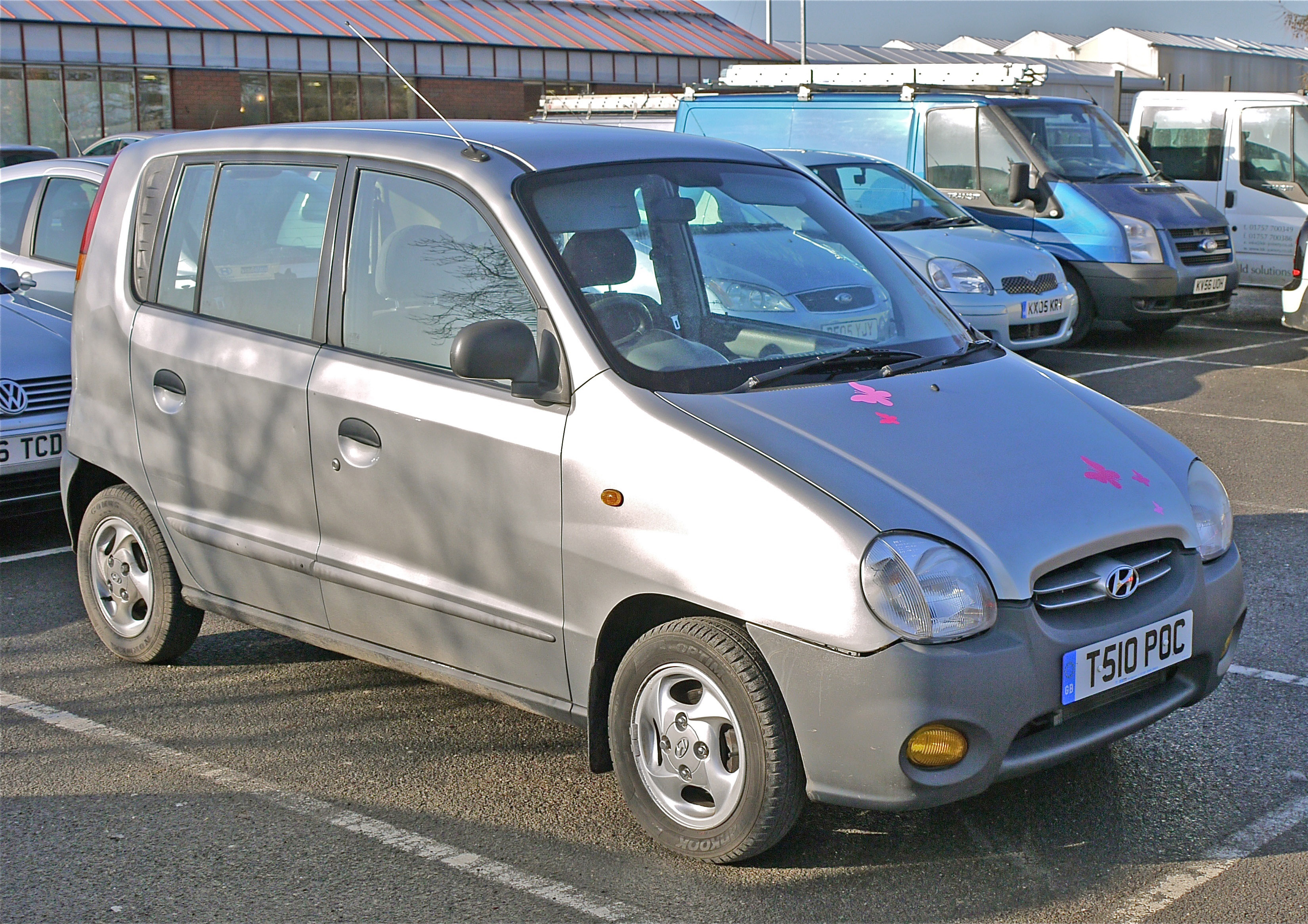
Pre-facelift Hyundai Atos with larger Hyundai emblem

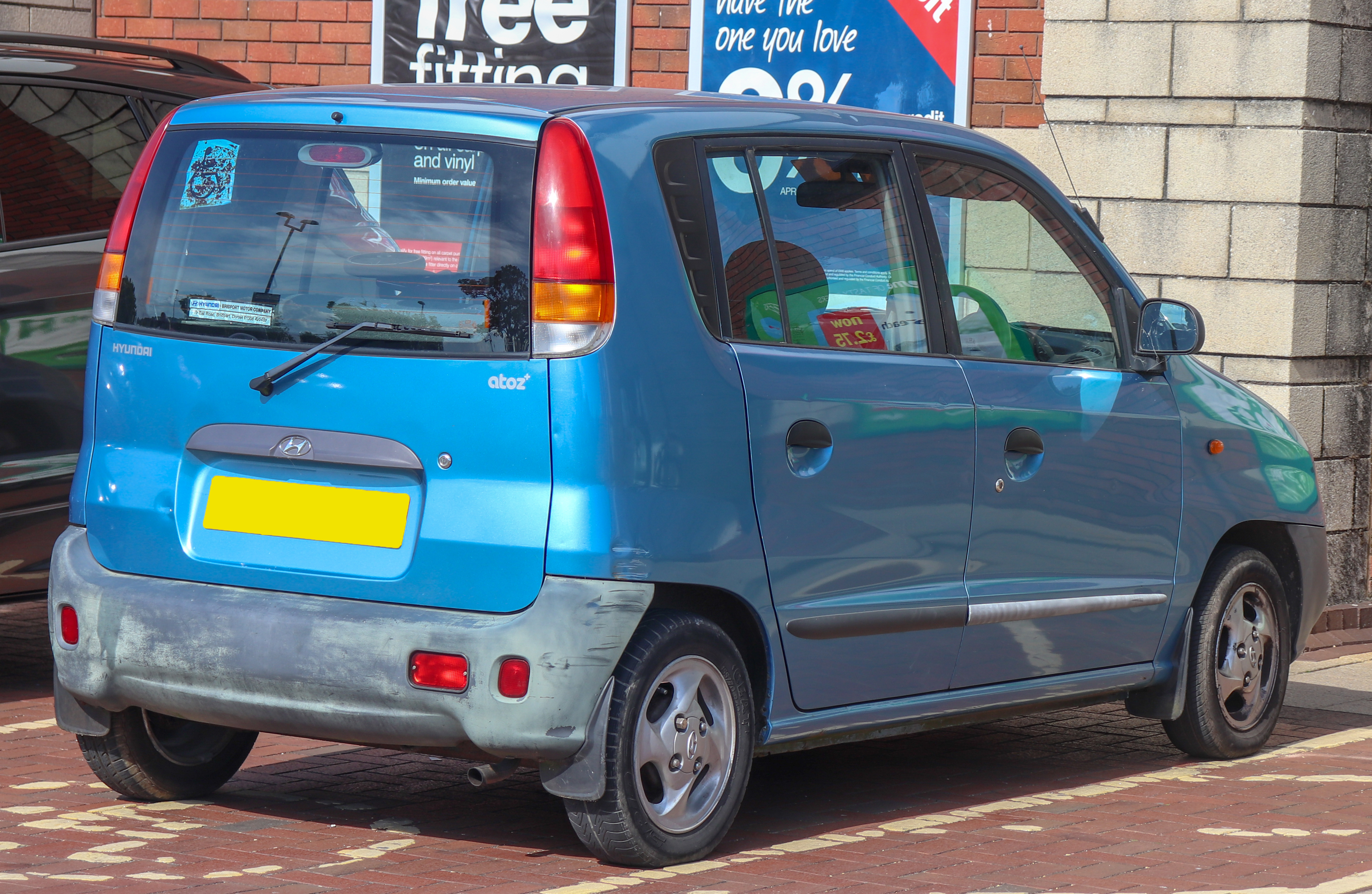
The rear end of the first Atos

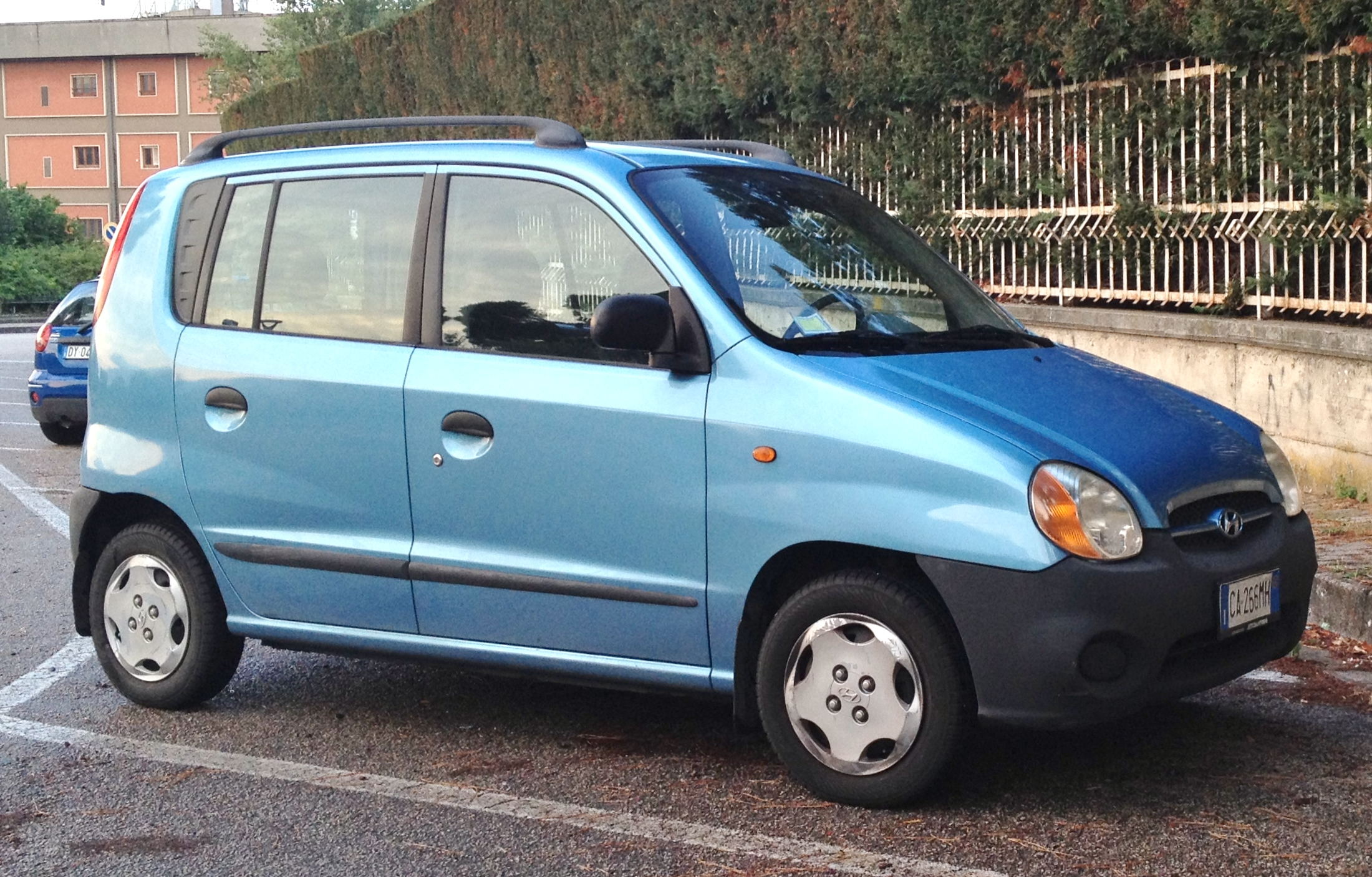
Hyundai Atos 1.0 (first facelift, Europe)

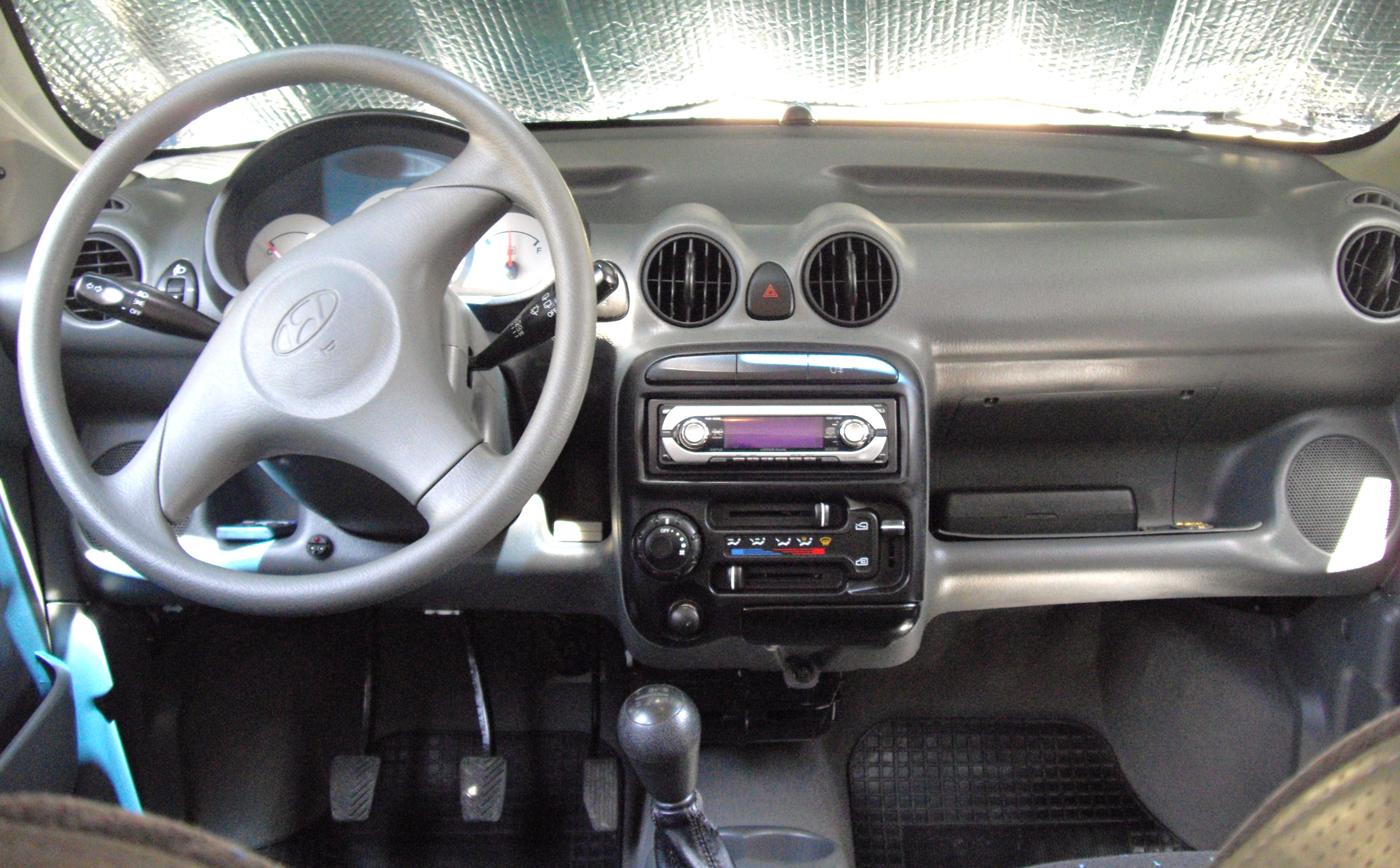
Interior

=== Introduction of Atos Prime (1999–2003) ===
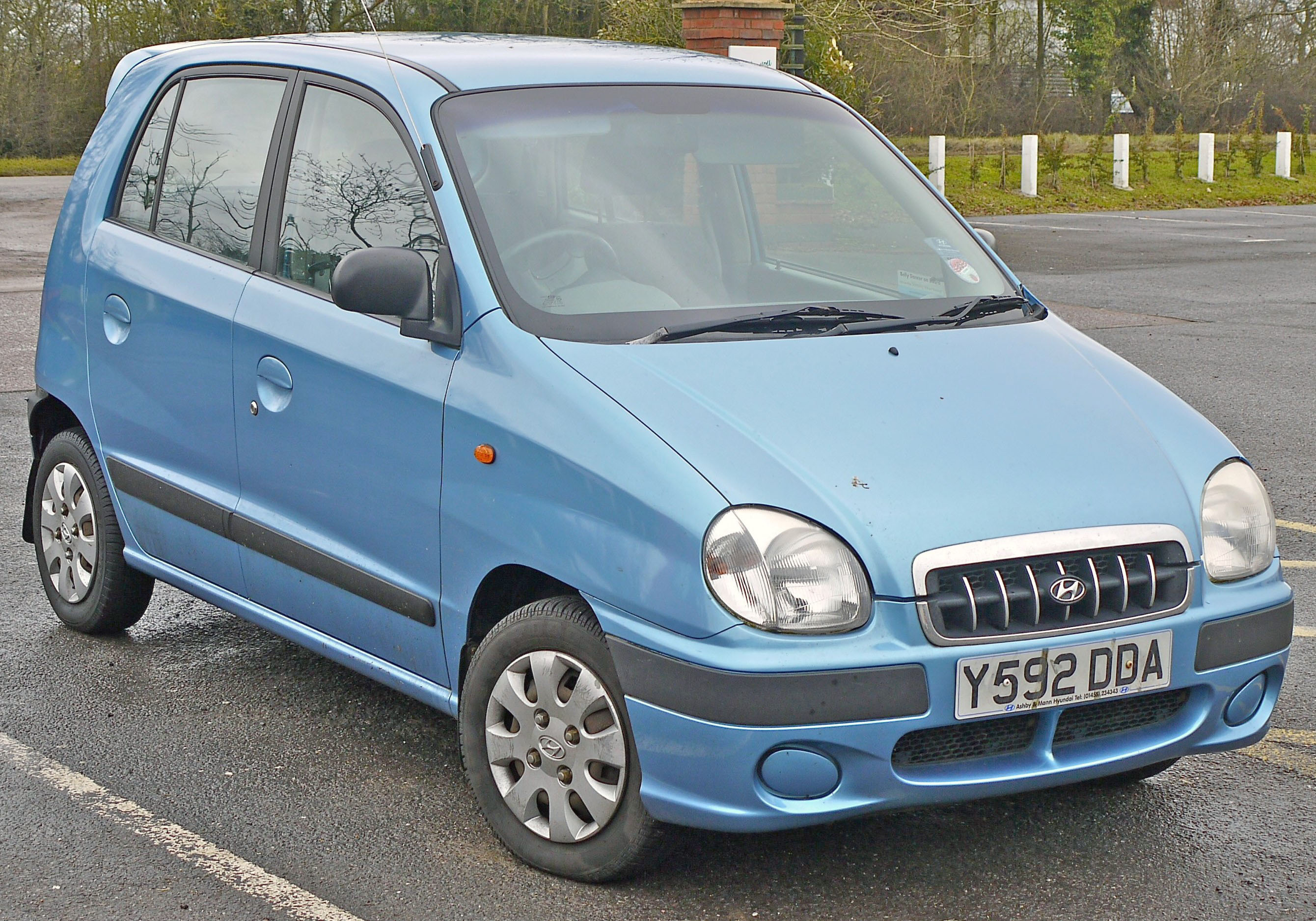
2001 Hyundai Amica Si (pre-facelift, UK)

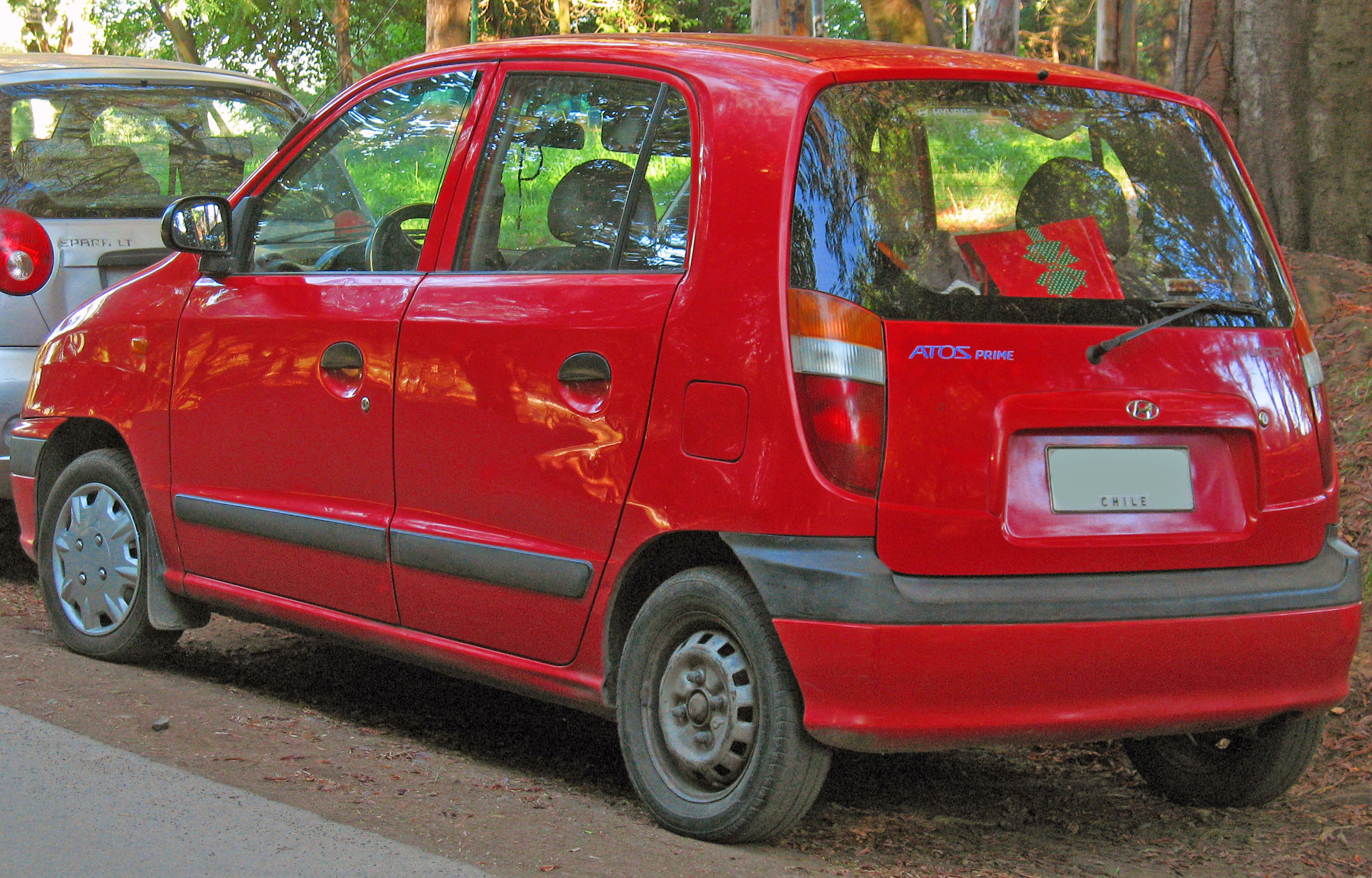
2001 Hyundai Atos Prime 1.0 GL (pre-facelift, Chile)

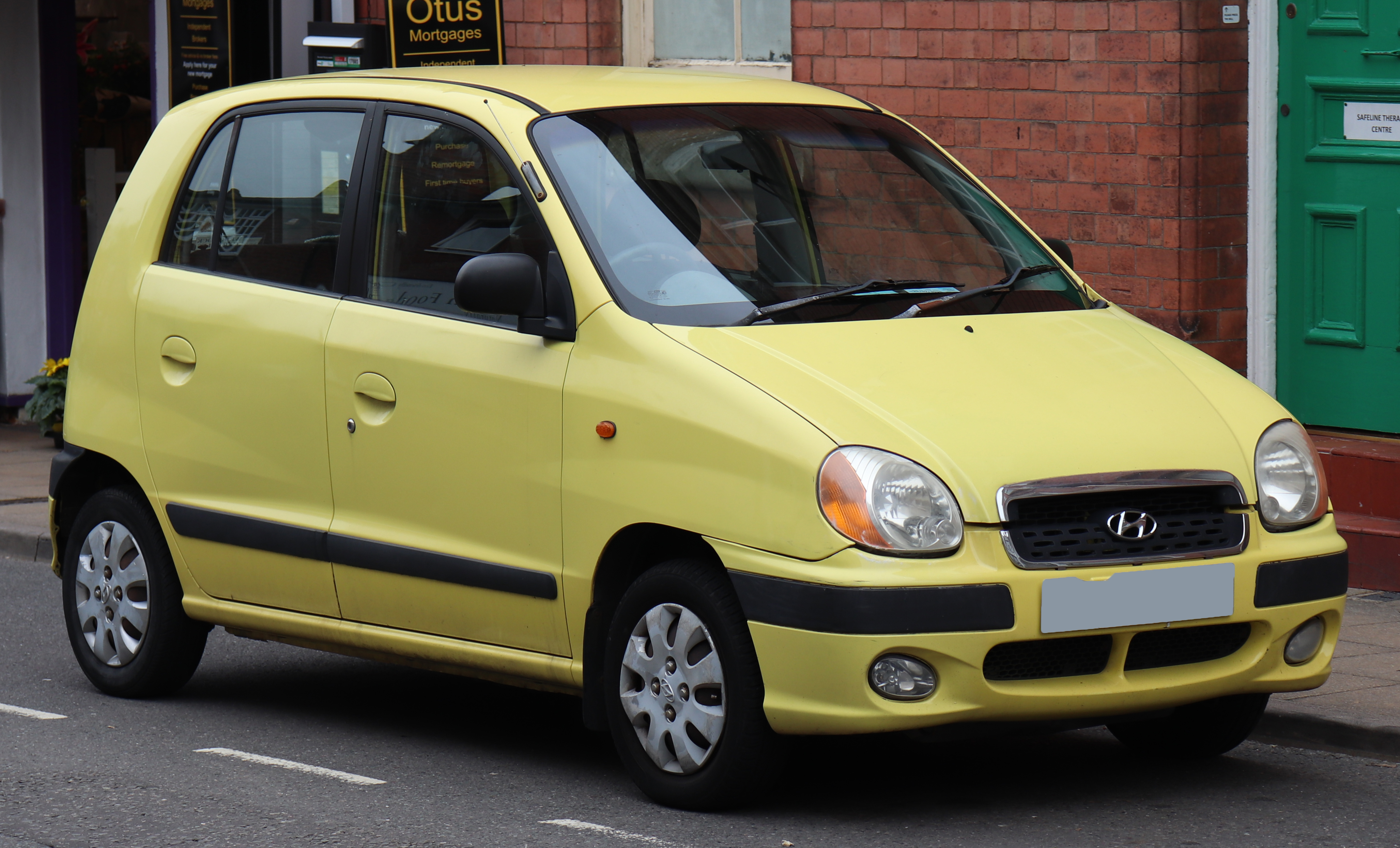

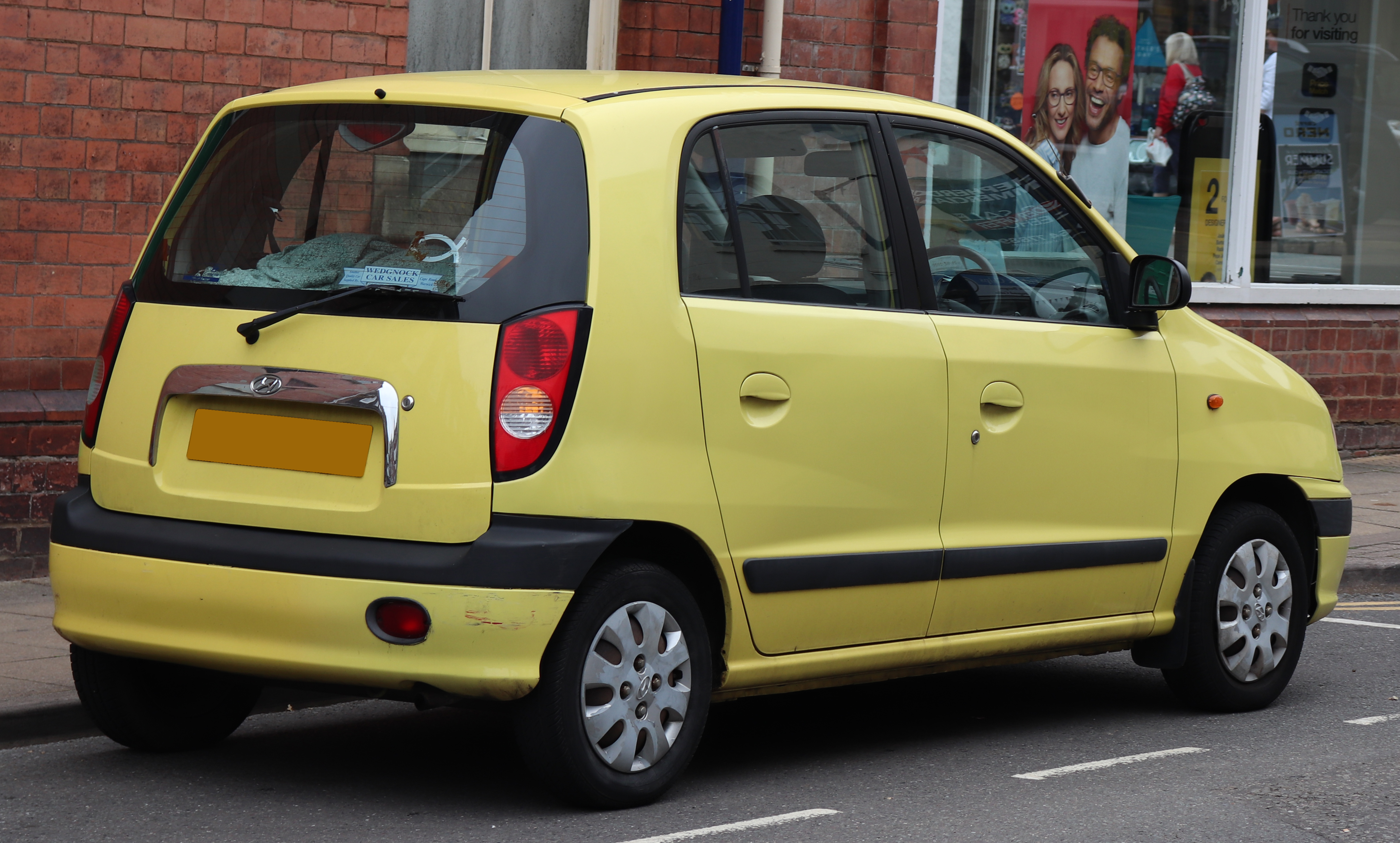
2002 Hyundai Atos Prime (first facelift, UK)

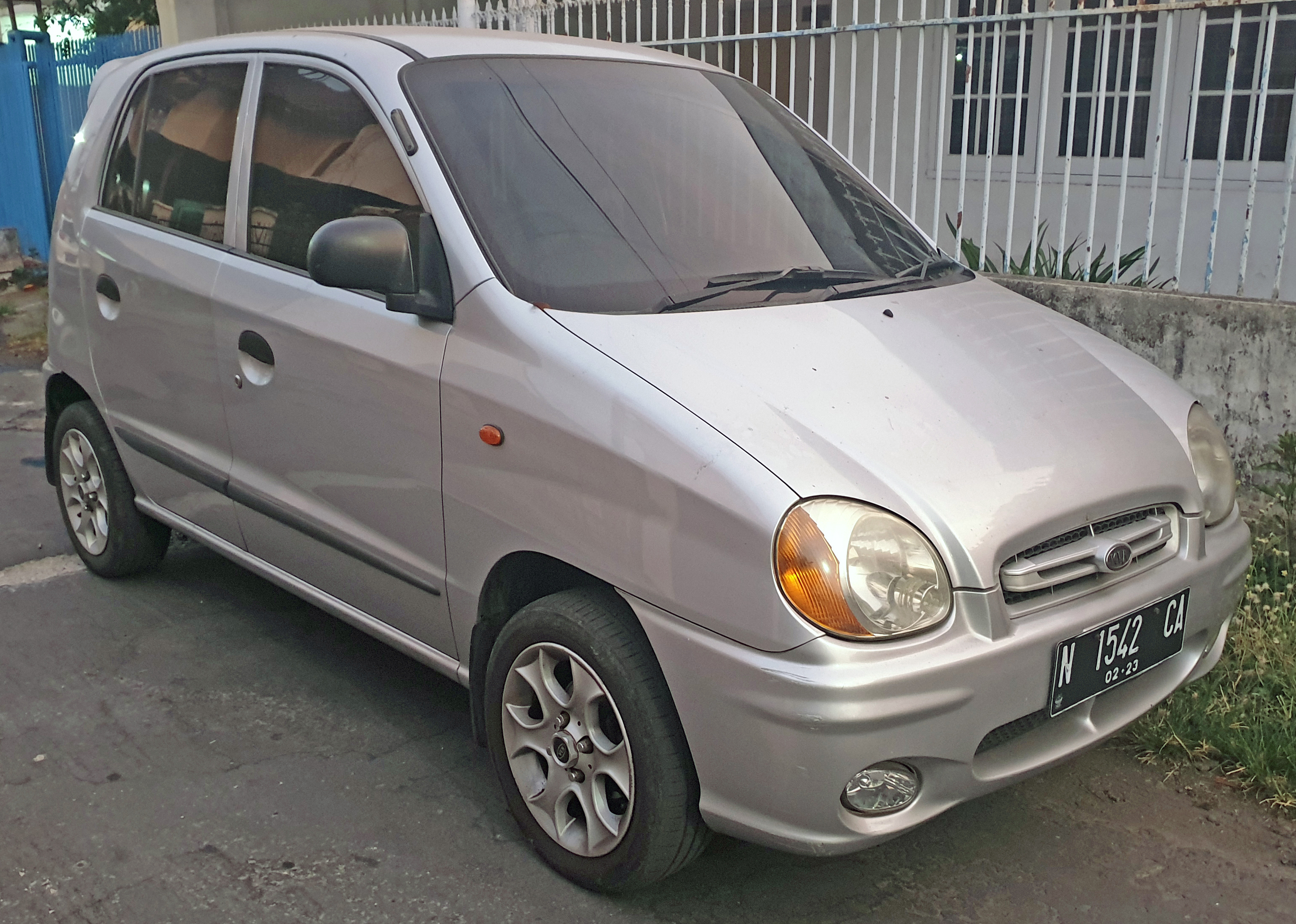

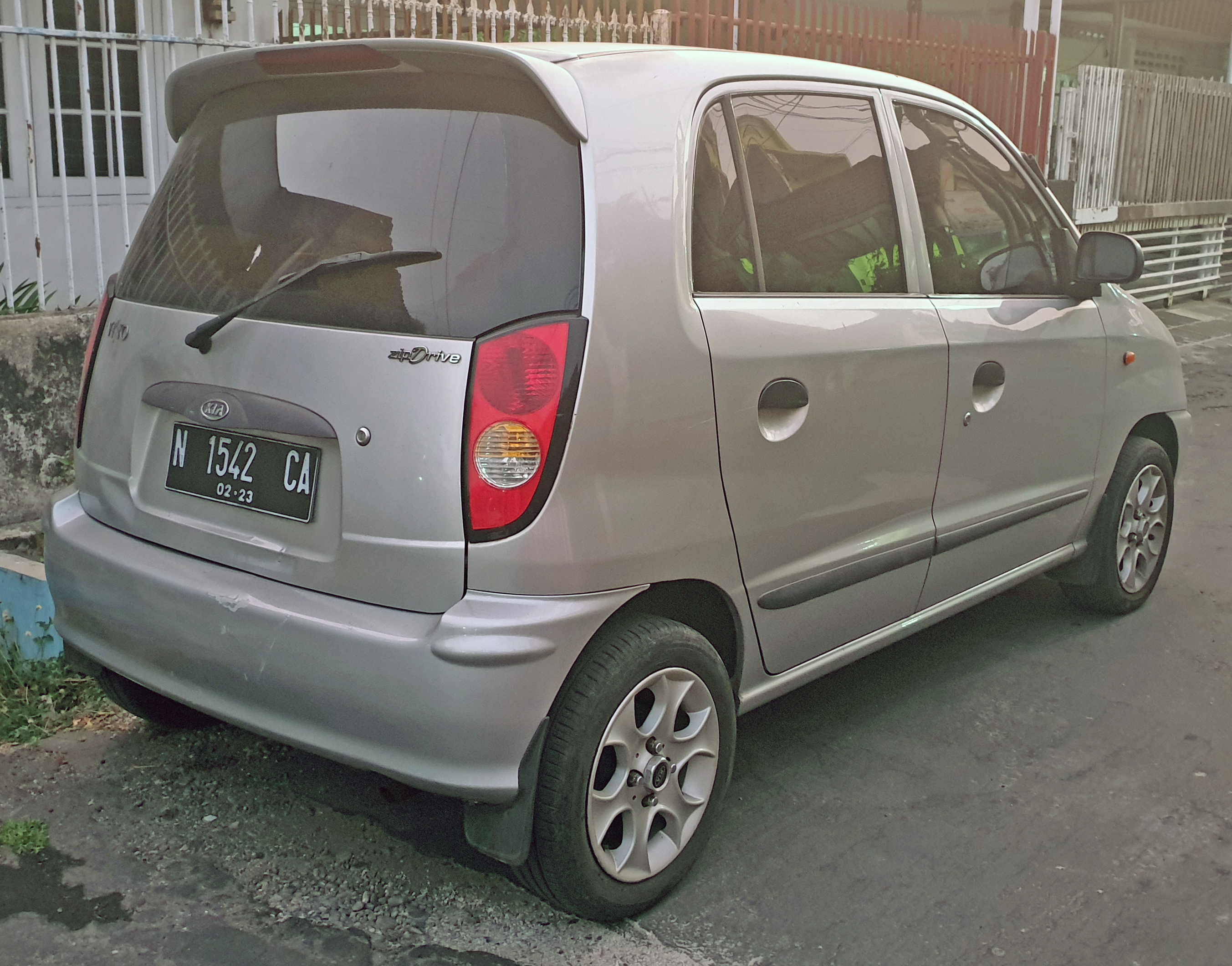
2002 Kia Visto zipDrive (facelift, Indonesia)

In India, the Atos Prime was adapted to local tastes and launched under the name Hyundai Santro, with production starting in October 1998. The bodywork was completely redesigned by lowering the roof by 4.5 centimeters and redesigning the tail with new lights, tailgate and bumpers (which were available in body color). The nose remained similar to that of the previous Atos, but the grille was changed and made available with chrome plating. The interior remained the same. At that time, Hyundai had acquired a majority share in fellow Korean manufacturer Kia and implemented a revitalization program that included sharing engines and platforms. The car was presented at the Busan Motor Show on 17 May 1999 as the Kia Visto, to be sold in Europe through the Kia sales network, alongside the old Atos that would remain in production and be sold by Hyundai dealerships. However, European Hyundai dealers opposed the decision to distribute the Visto as the car would have caused competition for the Atos; Hyundai thus renamed the car Atos Prime at the end of 1999, and positioned it as a more highly equipped model to complement the Atos, which remained in production, updated with new lights, bumpers and interior materials.

In South Korea and Indonesia, the Atos Prime was sold as the Kia Visto as originally planned, while the Atos remained in production, sold by Hyundai dealers.

Compared to the original Atos, the Prime had a less spacious interior but better aerodynamics due to the lower roof. The trunk was smaller, with capacity reduced to 219 litres up to a maximum of 889 liters with the rear seats reclined. The 1.0 litre petrol engine remained.

In December 1999, the Atos Prime was introduced in Europe, while in the same month the Atos underwent a slight facelift.

In September 2001, there was a further facelift to both the Atos and Atos Prime, with new headlights and bumper, and new tail lights for the Atos Prime. New interior upholstery also featured.

=== Second facelift (2003–2014) ===
Introduced in September 2003, the new version had an entirely new nose and tail, with new headlights, bonnet and bumper, in a more angular style. A new hatch and tail lights completed the rear. Only the doors, side panels and interior of the old Atos Prime were retained. It is also known as Santro Xing in India.

A new engine replaced the old Epsilon four-cylinder 1.0 (and the 0.8 Epsilon sold only in Asia). The new Epsilon 1.1 four-cylinder 12-valve engine delivered 59 hp (44 kW; 60 PS), 5 more than the previous 1.0. The gearbox remained the five-speed manual, with a four-speed automatic option.

In 2005, there was a slight facelift that introduced a new fascia and wheel designs. In addition, the engine in Europe was updated to the Euro 4 standard and the power rose to 63 horsepower.

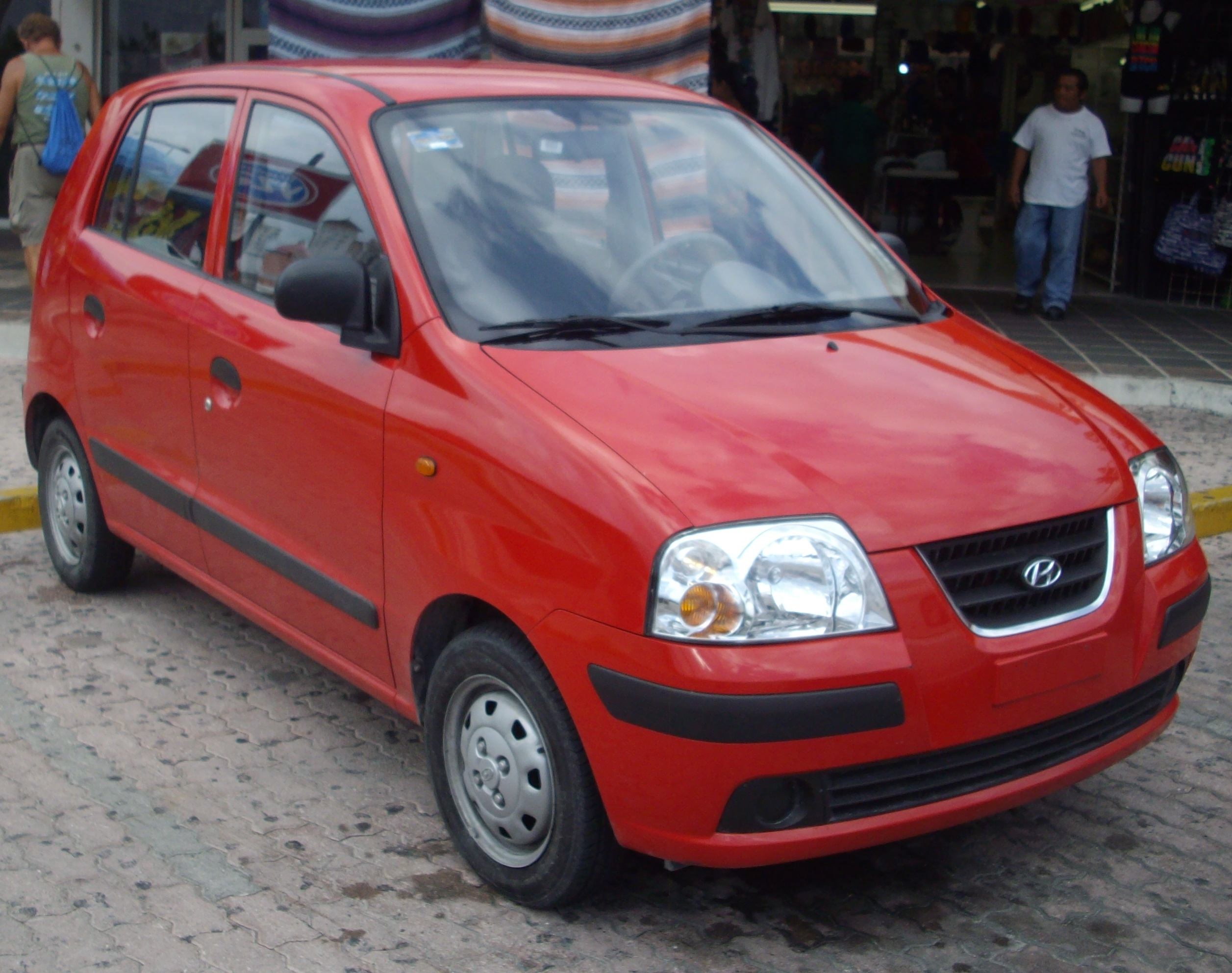
Hyundai Atos Prime (Mexico)

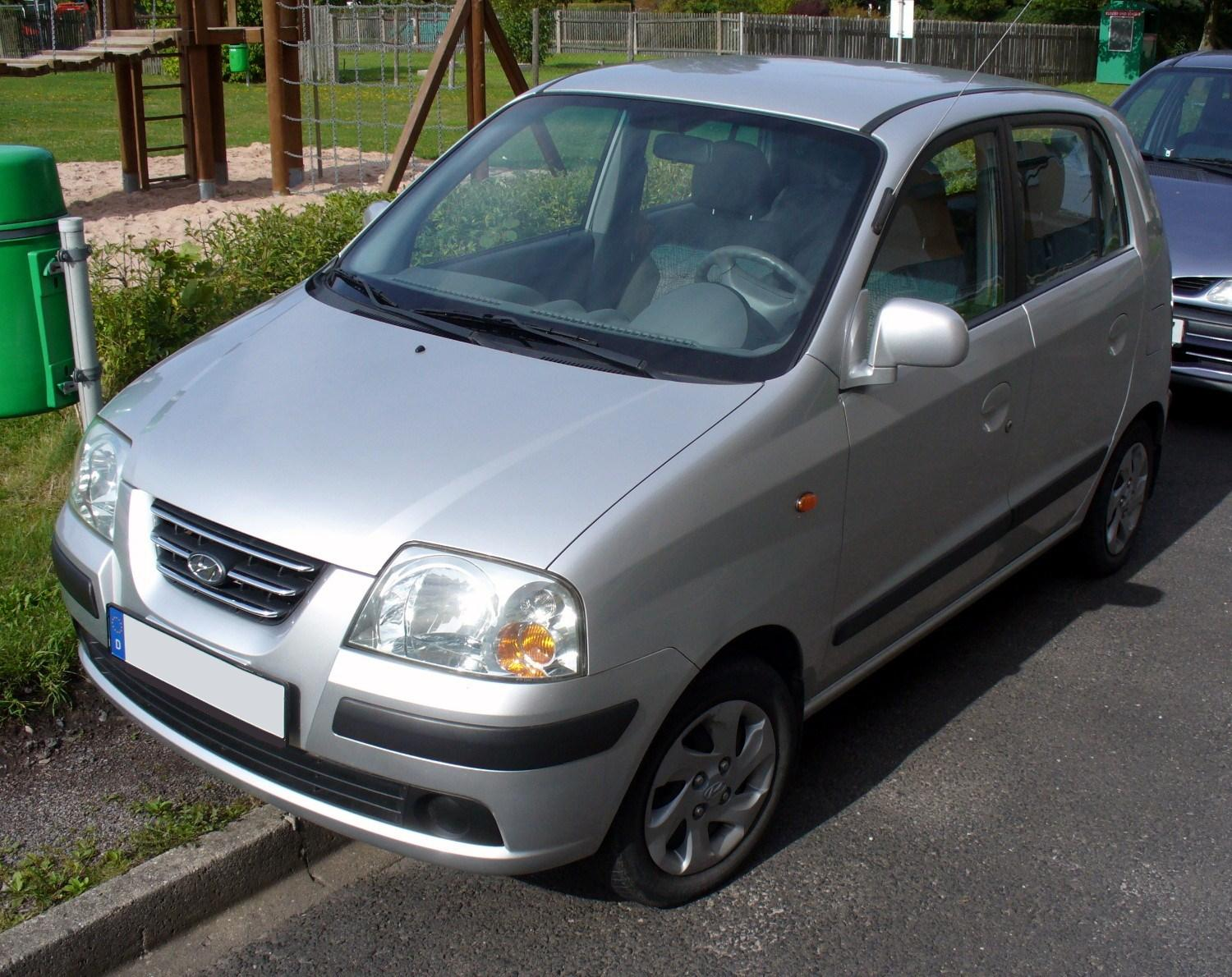
Hyundai Atos Prime (Germany)

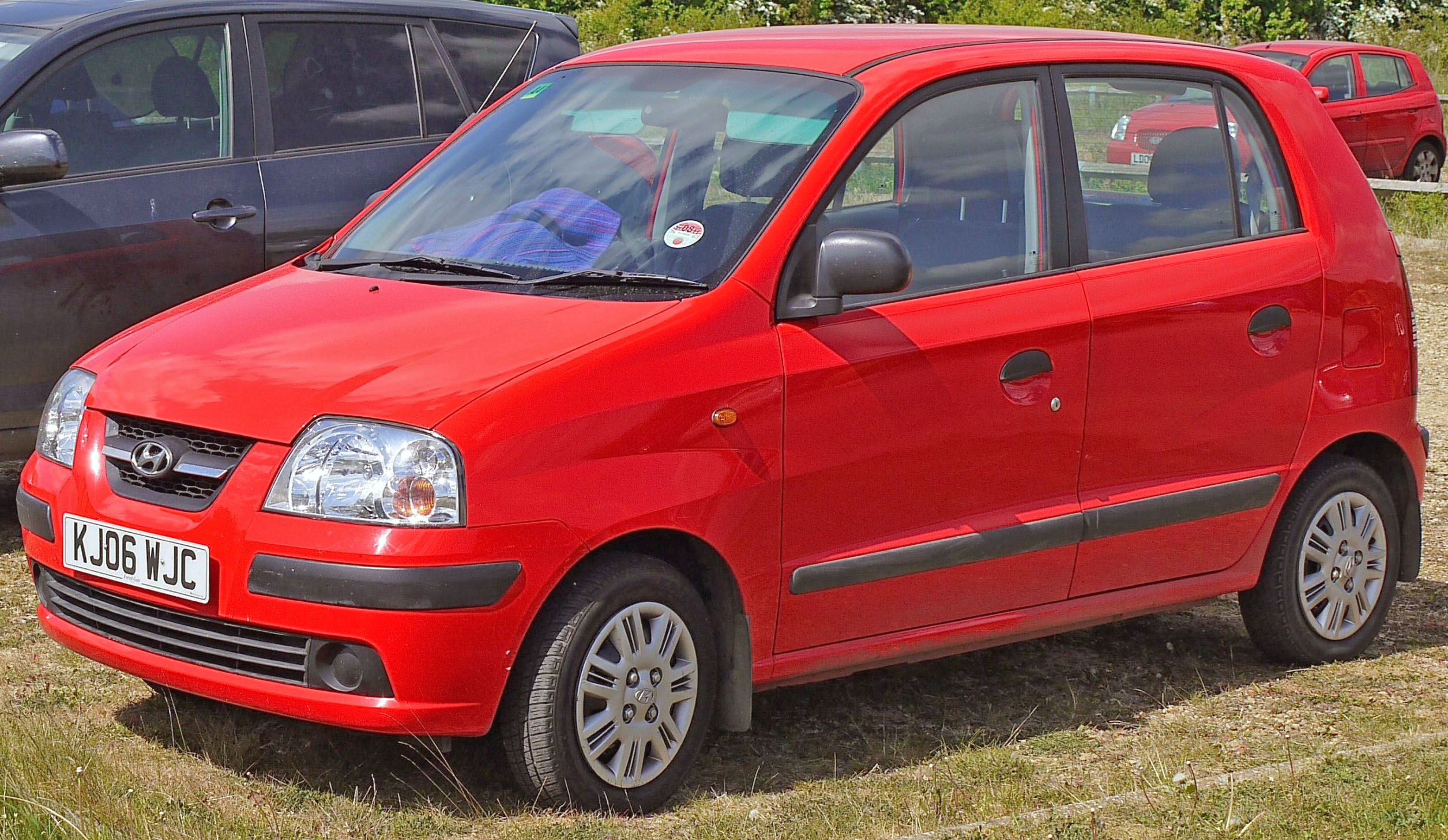
2006 Hyundai Amica GSi 1.1 (UK)

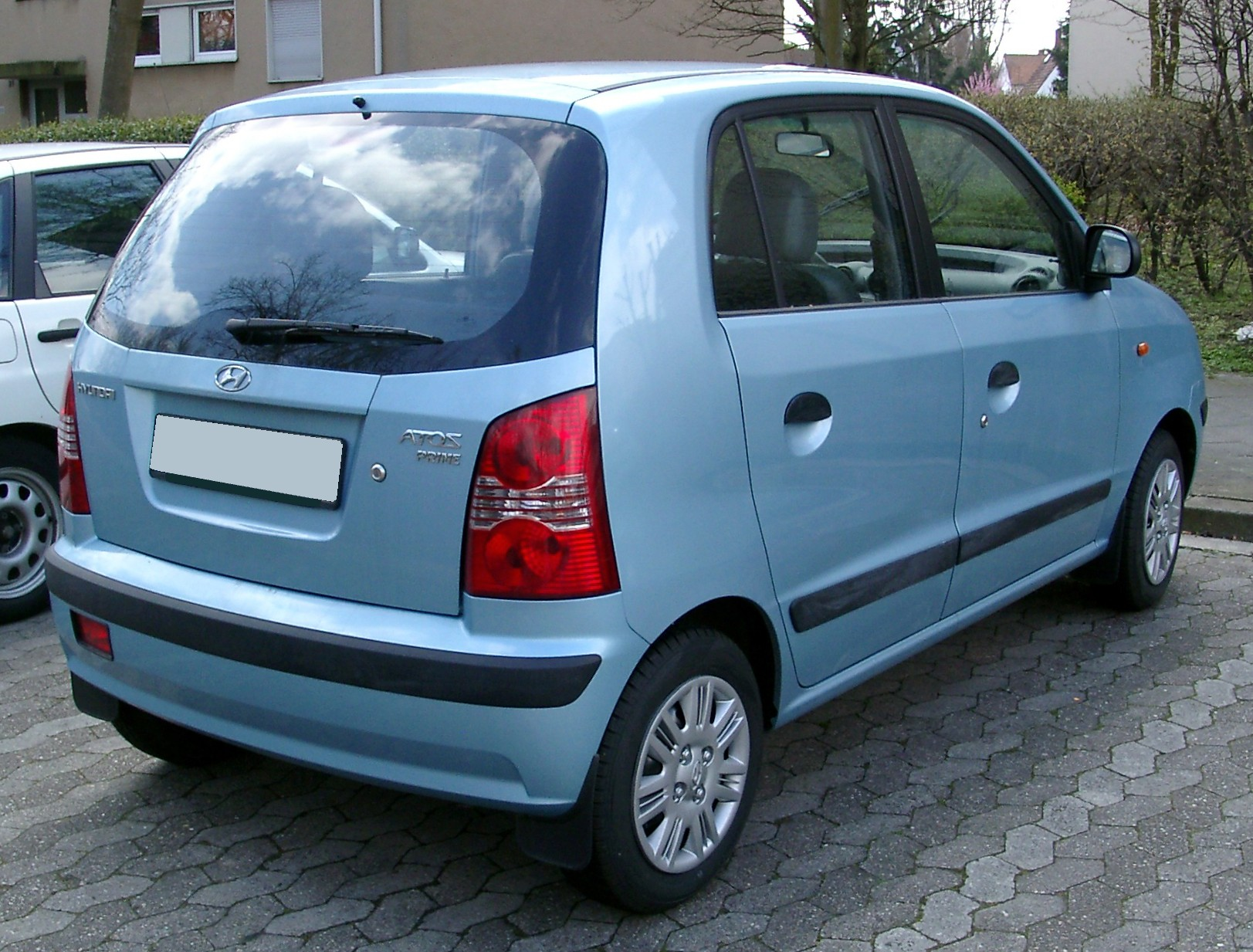
Hyundai Atos Prime (rear view)

== Other names ==
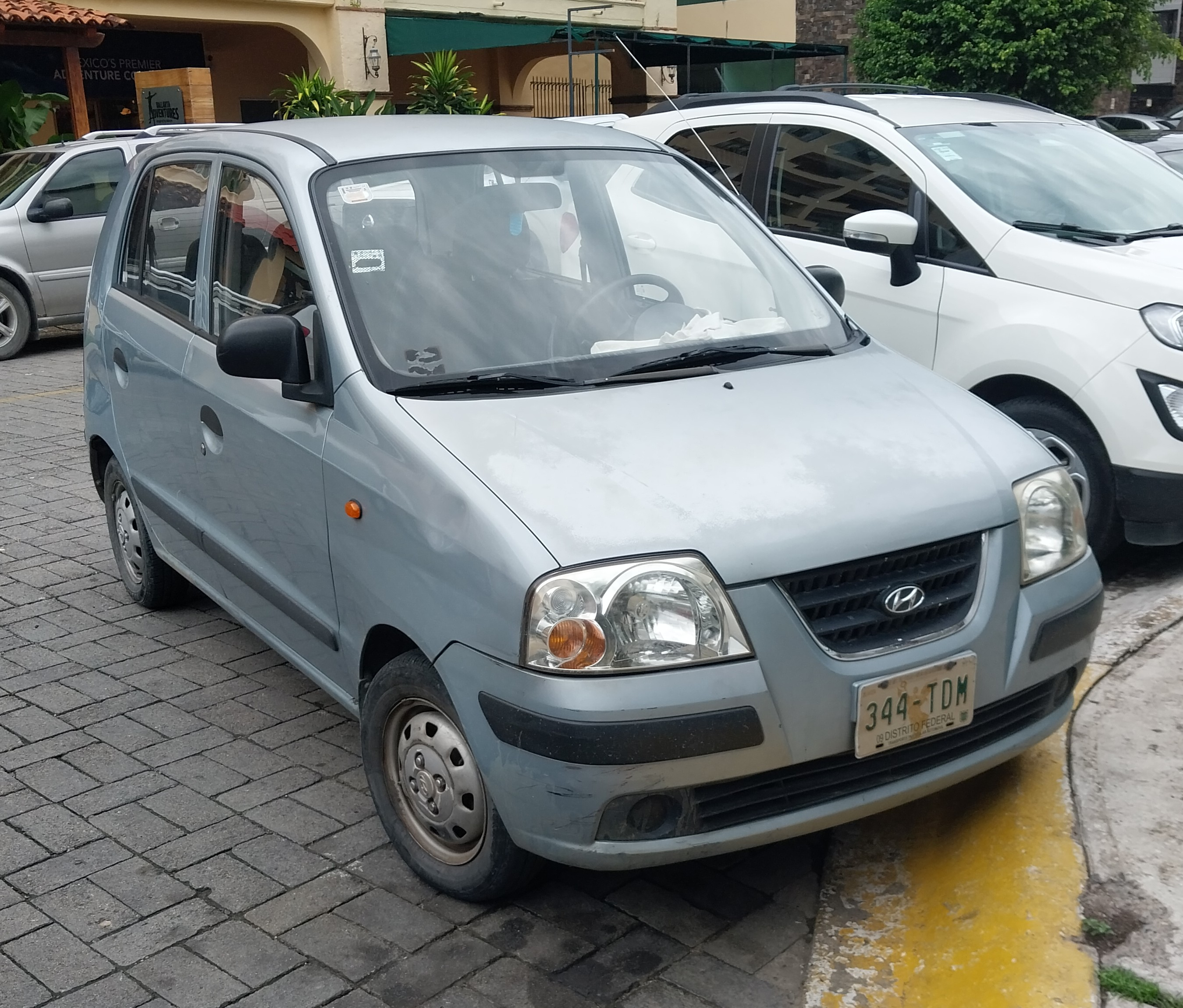
Dodge Atos (Atos by Dodge) in Puerto Vallarta, Jalisco

The Atos Prime is marketed as the:

- Hyundai Amica in the United Kingdom
- Hyundai Santro Xing in India
- Atos by Dodge in Mexico
- Kia Visto in Indonesia and South Korea (Hyundai also sold the original Atoz in Indonesia).
- Inokom Atos in Malaysia
- Hyundai Santro in India and Pakistan

The original Atos was sold under the Hyundai brand but rebadged as the Atoz (or "AtoZ") in some markets, including the United Kingdom. The Hyundai Santro is a rebadged version of the city car Hyundai Atos sold in some Asian markets, primarily South Asia.

The Kia Visto is a rebadged Hyundai Atos Prime.

== Markets ==
=== India ===
Hyundai entered the Indian market in 1997 with the Atos, marketed under the name Santro. Hyundai derived the name Santro for the Indian market from Saint-Tropez, a French city famous for fashion, because the company wanted to project it as a ‘fashionable’ car. Produced at Hyundai's factory in Chennai, its primary competitor at that time was the popular Maruti Suzuki Zen. The distinctive styling of the first generation had mixed reviews, but the car was a success primarily due to its power steering feature and price.

In the years since, the Indian version has undergone a number of upgrades in styling and technology to respond to consumer preferences. In 2003, the first generation (Zip) was replaced with the second generation Atos Prime, marketed in India as the Santro Xing, which enjoyed great sales success. The car was also exported from India in large volumes to the Asia and Oceania region.

In its final few years, Santro had become a popular option as a hatchback taxi, and the car was still selling close to 30,000 units per year when Hyundai made the decision to discontinue production.

Variants in India

The Hyundai Santro was first released in India in 1998. It came with three variants:

- Santro base, with AC and black bumpers, priced at 2,99,000 INR ex-showroom
- Santro DX 1, added with front power windows, central locking, high quality fabric upholstery a fabric inserts on door trims, body colored bumpers, rear wiper/washer/defogger, front fog lamps, waistline moulding and full wheel covers, priced at 3,49,000 INR.
- Santro DX 2, added with power steering and first in class rear seat belts, priced at 3,69,000 INR. These were often criticised for their appearance.
- In 2000, a new version called Santro Zip Drive was introduced. Changes included were things such as every variant got a power steering and a new grille.
- In 2002, a refreshed version called Santro Zip Plus was introduced. Changes included Clear Lens headlamps and taillamps and a better engine and performance.
- In 2003, the car underwent a complete facelift and was introduced as the Santro Xing. Pictures are given below alongside technical data.

=== Pakistan ===
The Santro was launched in Pakistan in 2000. It was discontinued in 2013.

=== Indonesia ===
In Indonesia, the Hyundai Atoz and Kia Visto was launched in 2000 with the 1.0-litre G4HC engine and initially sold as a complete built-up unit from South Korea (Atoz) and India (Visto). In 2001, Hyundai began production of the Atoz as a complete knock-down unit, which were assembled by Hyundai Mobil Indonesia in Bekasi, West Java, while the Visto continued to be imported from India. The Atoz and Visto received an update in 2002 with crystal multireflector headlamps and tail lamps. The Atoz received a redesigned front mesh grille. In 2004, the Visto was replaced by the Picanto. In June 2005, the Atoz received a facelift with the new Atos Prime front while maintaining the original Atos rear, and the engine was replaced with the 1.1-litre G4HG engine with multi-point fuel injection (the same engine as the Picanto). The Atoz was discontinued in 2008 and replaced by the i10 in March 2009.

The Atoz was available in two trim levels: the base GLX and higher-level GLS, while the Visto was available in Que trim, and later replaced with the zipDrive trim in 2002.

=== Malaysia ===
In Malaysia, the Hyundai Atos is locally assembled by Inokom carrying the badge Inokom Atos. The Inokom Atos Prima was later introduced in 2006 which has the new Atos Prime front while maintaining the original Atos rear.

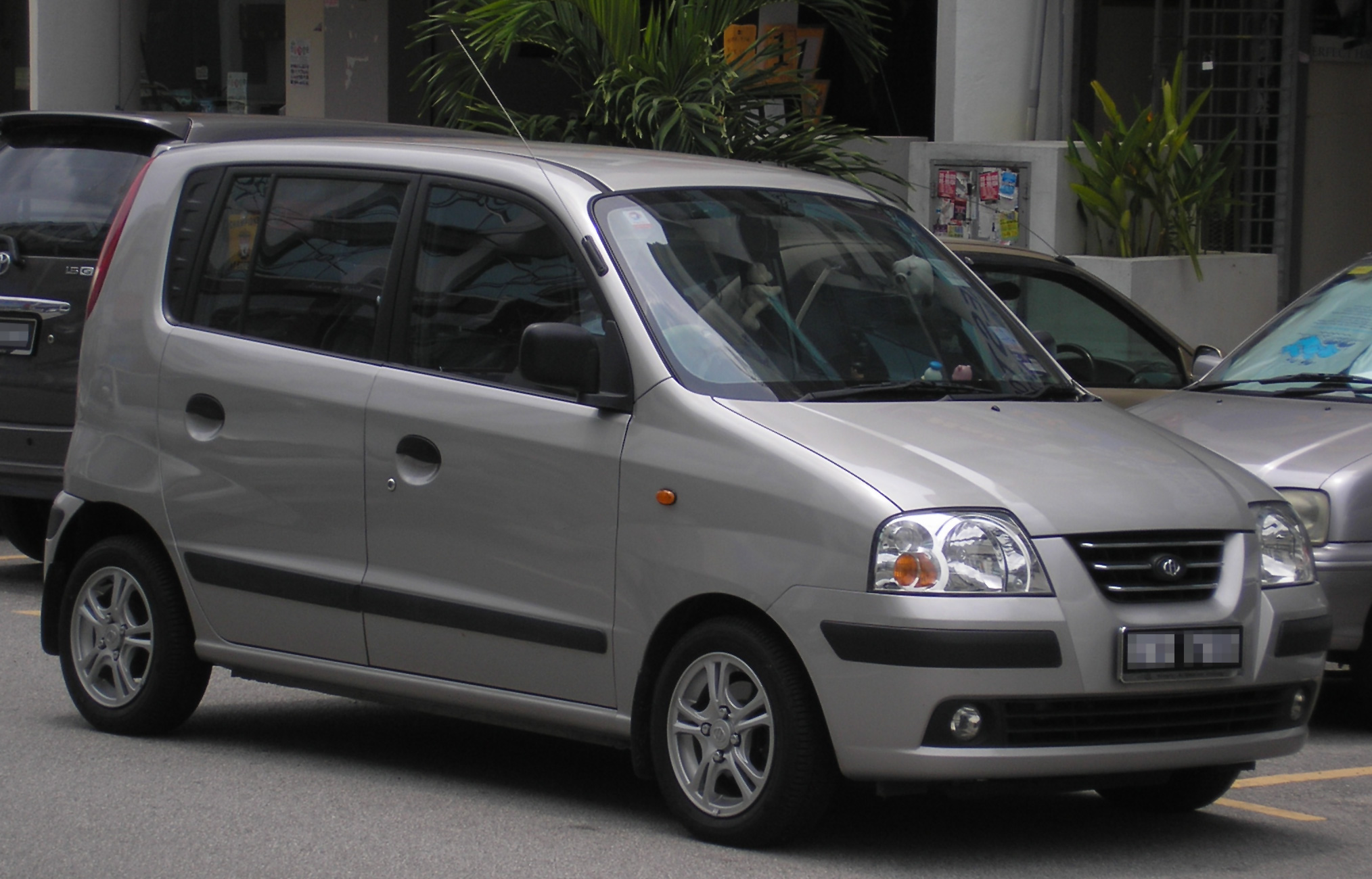
Inokom Atos Prima (Malaysia)

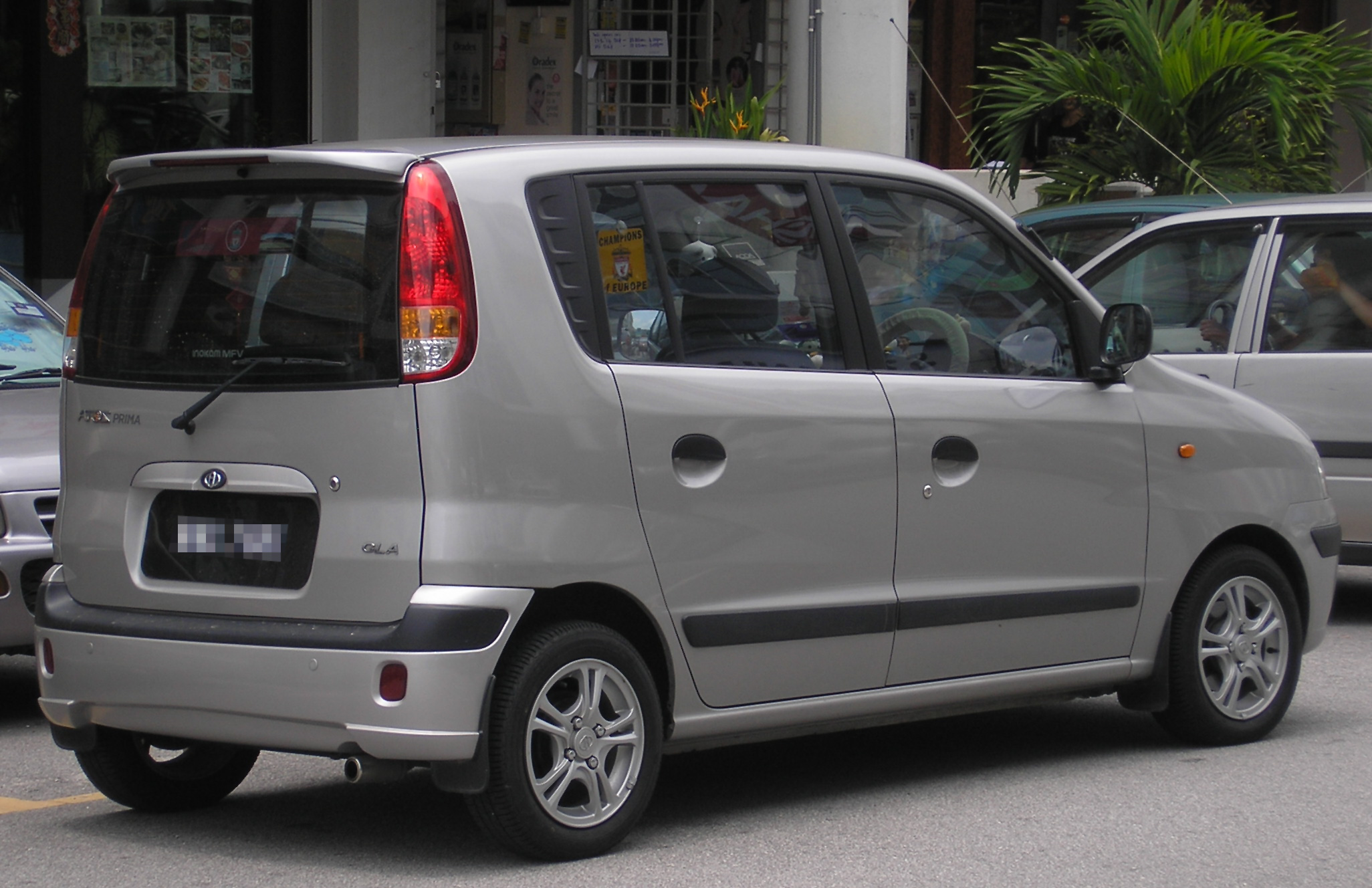
Inokom Atos Prima (Malaysia)

== Specifications ==
Figures as listed for the 2000-2003, 5 door, 1.0i model with GSi trim as sold in the UK (as the Amica), with standard options.

Technical data

- Fuel Delivery: Multi-Point Injection
- Transmission: 5-speed manual
- Engine size & layout: 996 cc, I4, 12 valves
- Peak Power: 40 kW (54.4 PS; 53.6 bhp)
- Peak Torque: 82 N⋅m (60 lb⋅ft)
- 0–97 km/h (0–60 mph): 14.6 s
- Top Speed: 160 km/h (99 mph)
- Fuel economy: 6.4 L/100 km (44 mpg_{‑imp}; 37 mpg_{‑US})
- Emissions: 151 g(CO_{2})/km (8.6 oz(CO_{2})/mi), other emissions below Euro III standard.

== Atos EV ==
Hyundai unveiled at the 1997 Frankfurt Motor Show an electric vehicle based on the Atos, the Atos EV. The Atos EV weights 1,173 kg (2,585 lb), including the battery pack, which holds 24 nickel metal hydride (Ni-MH) batteries. An on-board 6.6 kW conductive charger can fully recharge the Ni-MH batteries in seven hours. The Atos EV can travel more than 193 km (120 mi) in stop and go city driving and can reach a top speed of 129 km/h (80 mph).

== Awards ==
- Best compact car in Initial Quality 2004, Malaysia Initial Quality Study, awarded best car of the year 2006.
