= Hyundai Eon =

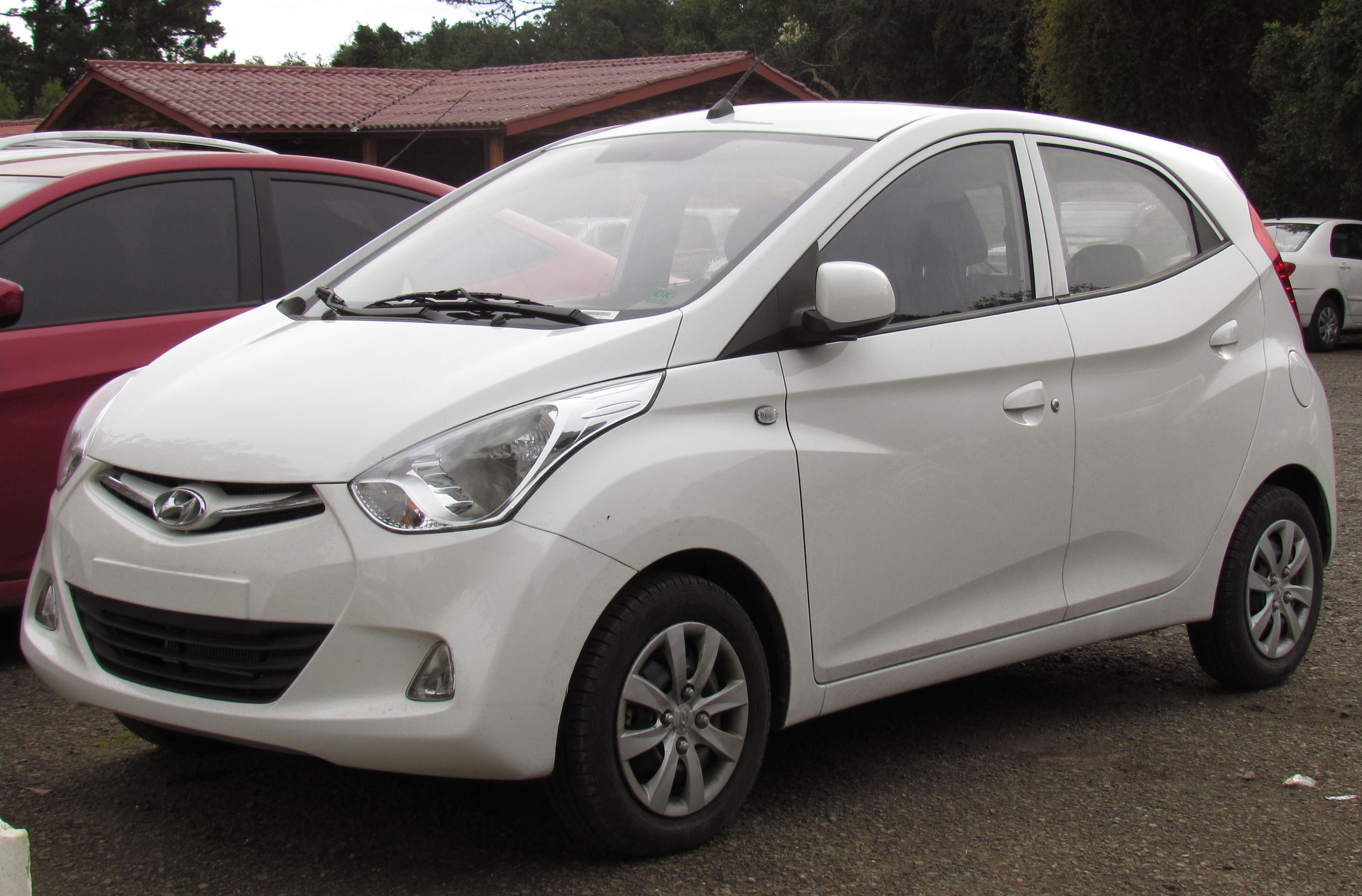

Overview
- Manufacturer: Hyundai
- Also called: Hyundai Atos Eon
- Production: April 2011 – May 2019
- Assembly: India: Chennai (HMIL); Philippines: Santa Rosa (HARI)

Body and chassis
- Class: City car (A)
- Body style: 5-door hatchback
- Layout: Front-engine, front-wheel-drive
- Platform: Hyundai-Kia SA
- Related: Hyundai i10 Kia Picanto

Powertrain
- Engine: Petrol: 0.8 L Epsilon I3; 1.0 L Kappa II MPi I3
- Transmission: 5-speed manual

Dimensions
- Wheelbase: 2,380 mm (93.7 in)
- Length: 3,515 mm (138.4 in)
- Width: 1,550 mm (61.0 in)
- Height: 1,510 mm (59.4 in)
- Curb weight: 715–790 kg (1,576–1,742 lb)

Chronology
- Predecessor: Hyundai Atos/Santro
- Successor: Hyundai Atos/Santro (AH2)

The Hyundai Eon is a city car produced by the South Korean manufacturer Hyundai. It was launched on 13 October 2011 in India, March 2012 in the Philippines, June 2012 in Vietnam, and June 2014 in Sri Lanka. It was also sold in Honduras, Nepal, El Salvador, Nicaragua, Chile, Peru, Panama, and Colombia. It was discontinued in India and other markets in 2019. It is also called the Hyundai Atos Eon in several markets.

The Eon was produced in India at Hyundai's Chennai plant for the domestic and export markets as the company's entry level city car, positioned below the Hyundai i10 and Hyundai Atos. It was only exported throughout Latin America, Africa and several Asian countries.

== Overview ==
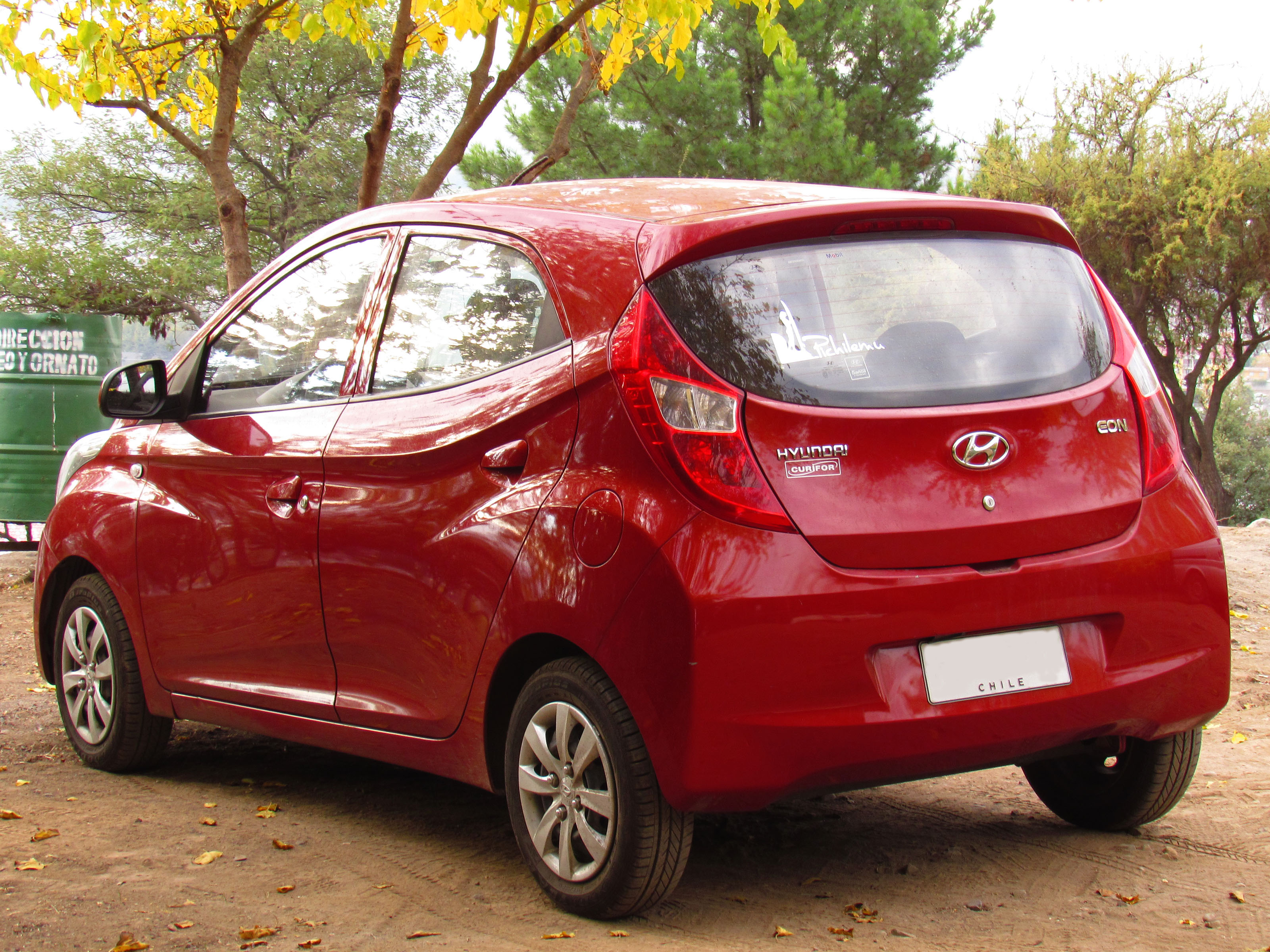
Rear view

The Eon was designed jointly between the Hyundai R&D centers in Namyang, South Korea, and Hyderabad, India. It was offered with an 814 cc three-cylinder petrol engine that generates 41 kW (55 bhp) and 75 N⋅m (7.6 kg⋅m) torque. According to Hyundai's Philippine distributor, the Eon has a fuel economy rating of 3.80 L/100 km (26.3 km/L). The car is equipped with 13-inch wheels fitted with 155/70 R13 tires.

In January 2012, Hyundai India announced LPG models of Eon as well. These models have a 34 L toroidal tank with an additional cost of approximately INR 27,000 to the available models.

In May 2014, Hyundai released a variant of the Eon with the 1.0-litre Kappa II three-cylinder engine also found in the European Hyundai i10 and Kia Picanto. The motor generates power of 51 kW (69 PS) at 6,200 rpm and peak torque at 94 N⋅m (9.6 kg⋅m) at 3,500 rpm.

In April 2017, Hyundai Asia Resources Incorporated (HARI) opened its Hyundai Assembly Center (HAC) in Santa Rosa to meet the increasing demand of the Eon in the Philippines. The plant also produces the Hyundai H350.

=== Facelift ===
As monthly sales had reached 10,000 units in India, Hyundai gave the car a facelift for the 2014 model year.

2017 marked the introduction of the Eon 'Sports Edition'. The 0.8 L limited-edition model added more equipment and styling enhancements over the Era+ and Magna+ variants that it is based on. Sold only in Polar White, exterior enhancements include side body moldings and roof rails, while the interior gains a 160 mm (6.2 in) touchscreen infotainment system with Phone-Link.

== Engine ==
Models	Displacement (engine model)	Power	Torque	ARAI Mileage
0.8 L	814 cc (49.7 cu in) I3 (G3HG)	56 PS (41 kW)@5500 rpm	75 N⋅m (7.6 kg⋅m) @ 4,000 rpm	21.1 km/L (50 mpg_{‑US})
1.0 L	998 cc (60.9 cu in) I3 (Kappa II)	69 PS (51 kW)@6200 rpm	94 N⋅m (9.6 kg⋅m) @ 3,500 rpm	20.3 km/L (48 mpg_{‑US})

== Safety ==
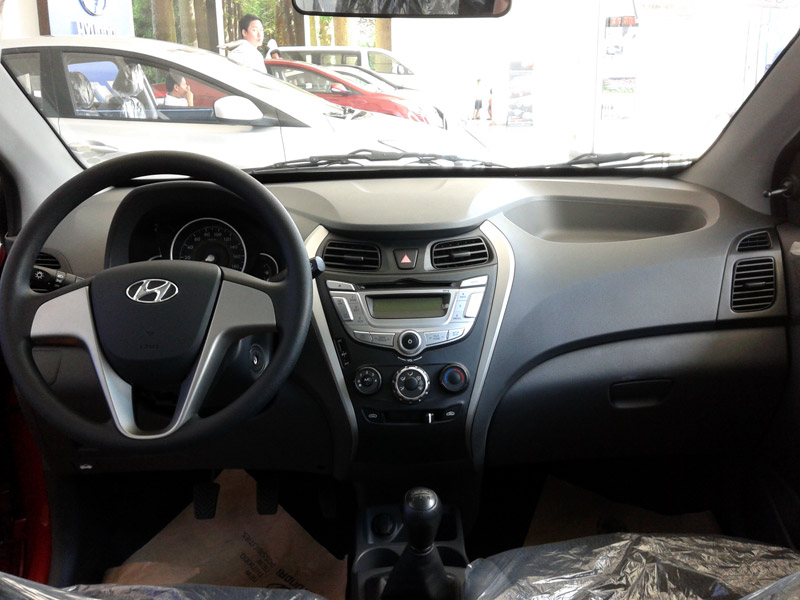
Interior

Models available in the Philippines (before 2016 MY) are sold with airbags on the top-spec GLS variant but not on the GLX (starting 2016 MY) and GL variant. However, in the Indian market, a driver's side airbag is standard on Sportz and Magna+ (1.0 L) variants, and optional on Era+ and Magna+ (0.8 L) models. In 2016, tests conducted by Global NCAP 1.0 awarded the Eon for India (without airbag and with no ABS) with a 0-star rating (based on Latin NCAP 2013). Many entry-level competitors sold in the Indian market also achieved this rating. Driver protection was rated as poor and front passenger protection was rated marginal (albeit with possible danger of knee impact).

Global NCAP 1.0 test results (India) Hyundai Eon – No Airbags (2016, similar to Latin NCAP 2013)
Test	Score	Stars
Adult occupant protection	0.00/17.00	0 /5 stars
Child occupant protection	20.42/49.00	2 /5 stars

ASEAN NCAP test results Hyundai Eon (2015)
Test	Points	Stars
Adult occupant:	0.00	0 /5 stars
Child occupant:	27%	1 /5 stars
Safety assist:	NA	

== Discontinuation ==
In August 2018, Hyundai Motor India Pvt. Ltd announced that the Eon will be discontinued by the end of September 2019, as the car is not compliant with new safety regulations that will be implemented in October 2019 and the Bharat Stage VI emissions regulations that will be enforced in April 2020. Its replacement, the third generation Santro, had been released before the festive season of 2018.
