= Hyundai Epsilon engine =

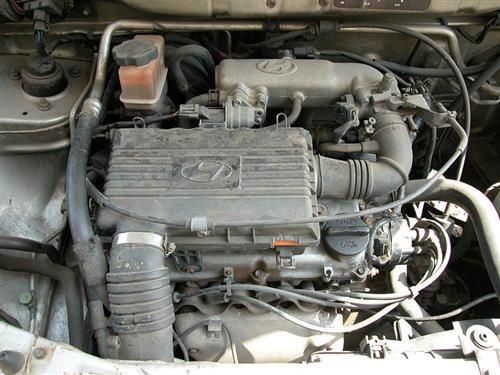
- Hyundai Epsilon 999cc L4 engine (G4HC)

Overview
- Manufacturer: Hyundai Motor Company

Layout
- Configuration: Straight-3; Straight-4
- Displacement: 0.8 L (798 cc); 0.8 L (813 cc); 1.0 L (999 cc); 1.1 L (1,086 cc)
- Cylinder bore: 63 mm (2.48 in); 66 mm (2.6 in); 67 mm (2.64 in)
- Piston stroke: 64 mm (2.52 in); 73 mm (2.87 in); 77 mm (3.03 in)
- Valvetrain: SOHC 2 or 3 valves x cyl.

Combustion
- Turbocharger: Yes (0.8L TCI)
- Fuel system: Fuel injection
- Fuel type: Gasoline; LPG
- Cooling system: Water-cooled

Output
- Power output: 48–70 PS (35–51 kW; 47–69 hp)
- Torque output: 6.6–10.5 kg⋅m (65–103 N⋅m; 48–76 lbf⋅ft)

Chronology
- Successor: Kappa

Hyundai's Epsilon engine is a category of small inline gasoline automobile engines.

== Variants ==
=== 0.8 L (G3HA/G3HG) ===
The G3HA and G3HG engines are a 3-cylinder, 9 valves, SOHC, 0.8 L (814 cc) version with a 67 mm × 77 mm (2.64 in × 3.03 in) bore and stroke. Output is 56 PS (41 kW; 55 hp) at 5,500 rpm and 7.6 kg⋅m (75 N⋅m; 55 lbf⋅ft) at 4,000 rpm. This engine was used in Hyundai's small hatchback Hyundai Eon. As the name suggests, this engine is a G4HG engine with one fewer cylinders mainly designed for high fuel efficiency.

=== 0.8 L (G4HA) ===
The G4HA is a 4-cylinder, 0.8 L (798 cc) version with a 63 mm × 64 mm (2.48 in × 2.52 in) bore and stroke. Output is 54 PS (40 kW; 53 hp) at 6,000 rpm and 7.4 kg⋅m (73 N⋅m; 54 lbf⋅ft) at 4,000 rpm.

=== 0.8 L LPG (L4HA) ===
The L4HA is a 4-cylinder, 0.8 L (798 cc) LPG version with a 63 mm × 64 mm (2.48 in × 2.52 in) bore and stroke. Output is 48 PS (35 kW; 47 hp) at 6,000 rpm and 6.6 kg⋅m (65 N⋅m; 48 lbf⋅ft) at 4,000 rpm.

=== 0.8 L TCI (G4HA) ===
The G4HA is a turbocharged 4-cylinder, 0.8 L (798 cc) version with a 63 mm × 64 mm (2.48 in × 2.52 in) bore and stroke. Output is 70 PS (51 kW; 69 hp) at 6,000 rpm and 10.5 kg⋅m (103 N⋅m; 76 lbf⋅ft) at 4,000 rpm.

=== 1.0 L (G4HC/G4HE) ===
The G4HC/G4HE is a 4-cylinder 3 valves per cylinder engine that displaces 1.0 L (999 cc) with a larger 66 mm × 73 mm (2.60 in × 2.87 in) bore and stroke.

The G4HC power is 54–58 PS (40–43 kW; 53–57 hp) at 5,700 rpm and 7.4–8.6 kg⋅m (73–84 N⋅m; 54–62 lbf⋅ft) at 3,000 rpm. This engine has been used in Hyundai's Hatchback Atos/Santro.

The G4HE power is 61–72 PS (45–53 kW; 60–71 hp) at 5,600–6,000 rpm and 8.8–9.2 kg⋅m (86–90 N⋅m; 64–67 lbf⋅ft) at 4,500 rpm. This engine has been used in the Kia Picanto.

=== 1.0 L LPG (L4HE) ===
The L4HE is a 4-cylinder, 1.0 L (999 cc) LPG version with a 66 mm × 73 mm (2.60 in × 2.87 in) bore and stroke. Output is 67–72 PS (49–53 kW; 66–71 hp) at 5,600–6,000 rpm and 9–9.2 kg⋅m (88–90 N⋅m; 65–67 lbf⋅ft) at 3,000–4,500 rpm.

=== 1.1 L (G4HD/G4HG) ===
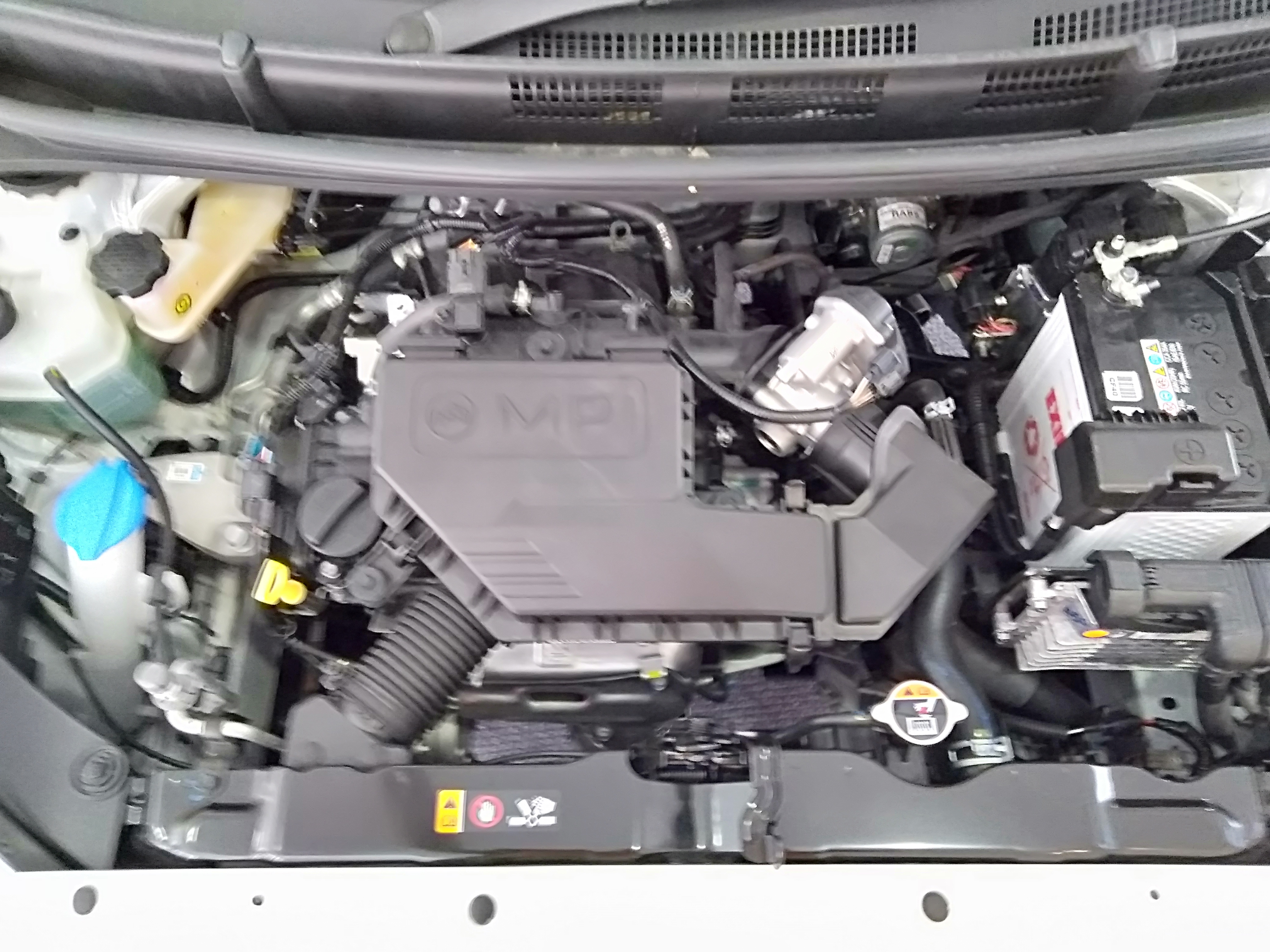
1.1 Epsilon G4HG engine on Hyundai Atos/Santro.

The G4HD/G4HG is a 4-cylinder 3 valves per cylinder engine that displaces 1.1 L (1,086 cc) with a larger 67 mm × 77 mm (2.64 in × 3.03 in) bore and stroke. This engine has been used in Hyundai's i10 (PA), Atos, Santro Xing cars and Kia Picanto. Firing order of this engine is 1-3-4-2 and idle rpm is 750± 100.

The G4HD power is 60–64 PS (44–47 kW; 59–63 hp) at 5,500 rpm and 8.9–9.6 kg⋅m (87–94 N⋅m; 64–69 lbf⋅ft) at 2,800 rpm.

The G4HG power is 64–70 PS (47–51 kW; 63–69 hp) at 5,500 rpm and 9.9–10.1 kg⋅m (97–99 N⋅m; 72–73 lbf⋅ft) at 2,800–4,500 rpm.

The CNG version of the engine is rated 60 PS (44 kW; 59 hp) at 5,500 rpm and 8.7 kg⋅m (85 N⋅m; 63 lbf⋅ft) at 4,500 rpm.

== See also ==
- List of Hyundai engines
