= Suzuki SX4 =

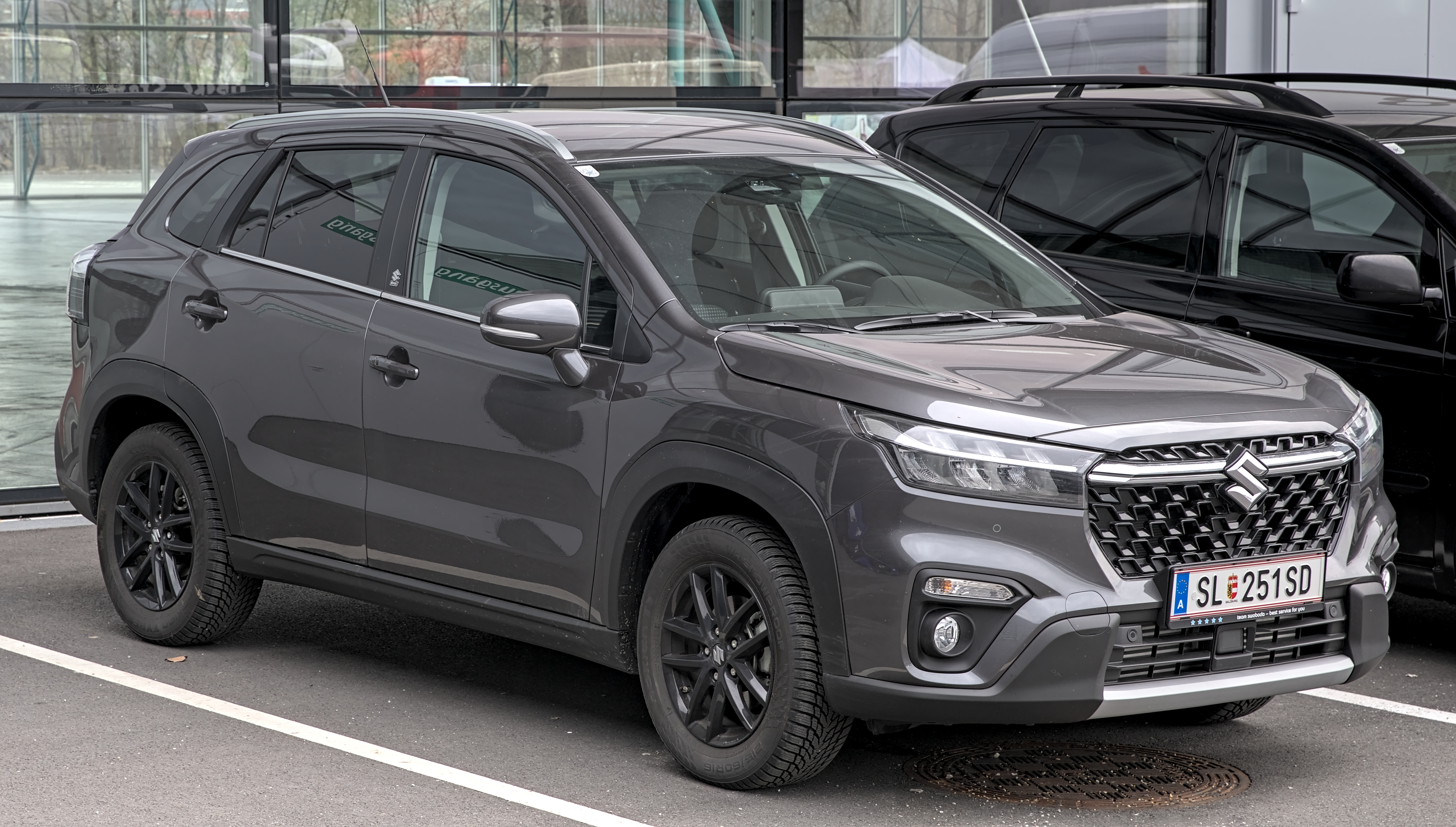

Overview
- Manufacturer: Suzuki
- Also called: Fiat Sedici
- Production: 2006–present

Body and chassis
- Class: Subcompact car (2006–2013); Subcompact crossover SUV (2006–present)

Chronology
- Predecessor: Suzuki Aerio/Liana; Suzuki Forenza/Reno

The Suzuki SX4 is a subcompact car and crossover produced by Japanese automaker Suzuki since 2006. A successor of the Aerio tall hatchback and sedan, the first-generation model was available as a hatchback and sedan, with the former available in both front- and four-wheel drive. In Europe, it was sold alongside a rebadged version called the Fiat Sedici.

In 2013, the second generation was launched, called Suzuki SX4 S-Cross (or Suzuki S-Cross in India)— now exclusively a subcompact crossover SUV. The first- and second-generation SX4s sold alongside one another until 2014. The SX4 sedan was replaced with the Suzuki Ciaz. The third-generation model was introduced in 2021 as a heavily modified version of the previous model and was only produced in Hungary for the European market. For the Indian market, the S-Cross was replaced by the taller Grand Vitara.

The SX4 is an abbreviation of "Sports X-over 4 Seasons". The SX4 designation was previously used by American Motors Corporation (AMC) from the 1981 through 1983 model years for a sporty liftback model in its line of all-wheel-drive AMC Eagle passenger cars. While the "S-Cross" suffix is an abbreviation of Smart Crossover.

== First generation (GY/EY/RW; 2006) ==
First generation
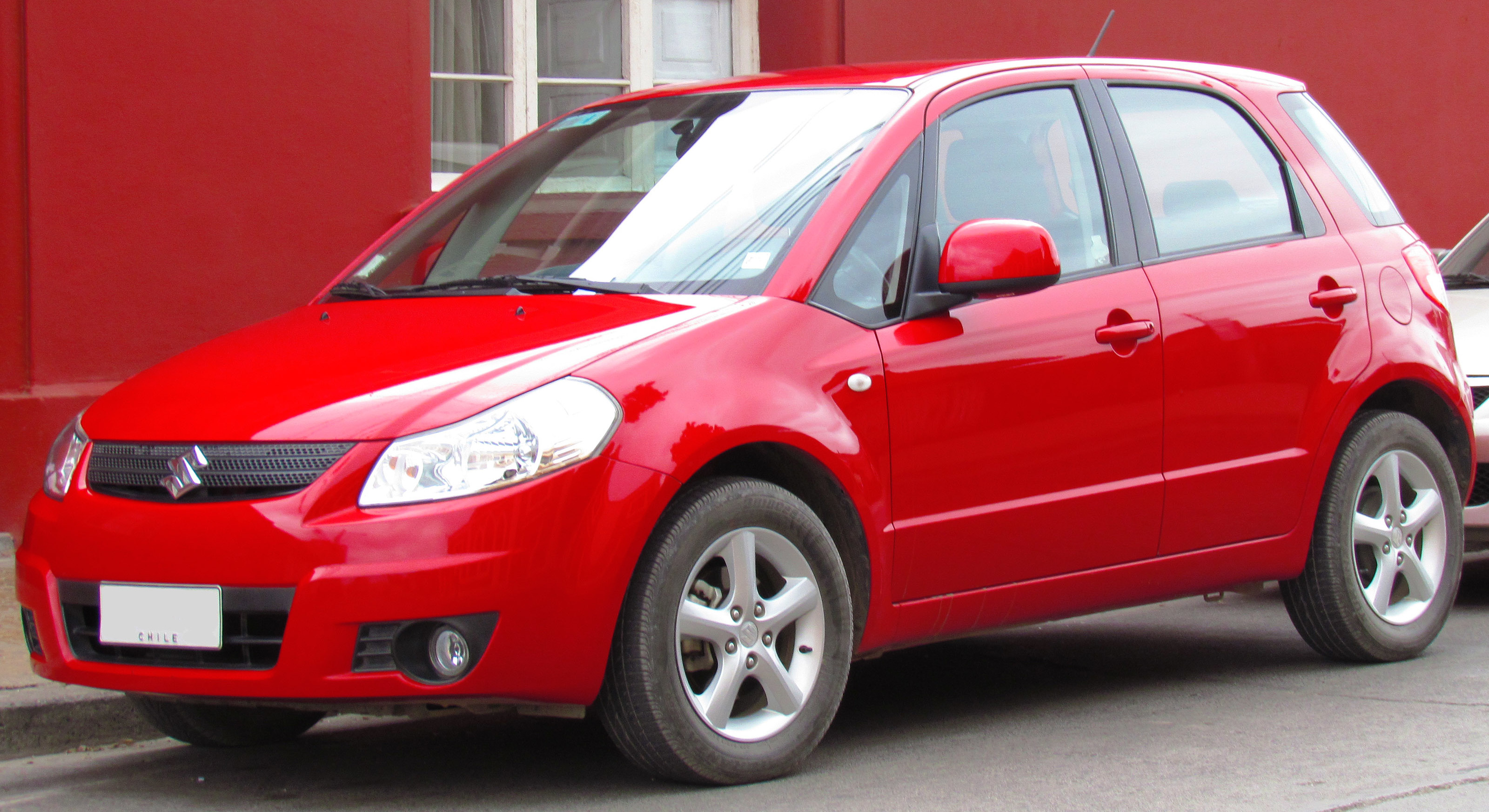
- Pre-facelift Suzuki SX4 hatchback (Chile)

Overview
- Model code: GY; EY; RW
- Also called: Fiat Sedici (Europe); Suzuki Neo Baleno (sedan; Indonesia)
- Production: December 2005 – 2013 (Hungary); 2006–2014 (Japan); 2007–2014 (India); 2008–2012 (Indonesia); 2006–2018 (China)
- Assembly: Hungary: Esztergom (Magyar Suzuki); Japan: Sagara, Shizuoka; India: Manesar, (Maruti Suzuki); China: Chongqing (Changan Suzuki); Indonesia: Bekasi (Suzuki Indomobil Motor)
- Designer: Giorgetto Giugiaro at Italdesign

Body and chassis
- Class: Subcompact car (hatchback, sedan); Subcompact crossover SUV (crossover)
- Body style: 5-door hatchback; 4-door sedan
- Layout: Front-engine, front-wheel-drive or four-wheel-drive
- Platform: Suzuki A-Segment Platform

Powertrain
- Engine: Petrol: 1.5 L M15A I4; 1.6 L M16A I4; 1.8 L M18A I4; 2.0 L J20A/J20B I4; Diesel: 1.25 L D13A turbo I4 (India); 1.6 L DV6ATED4 turbo I4; 1.9 L D19A turbo I4; 2.0 L D20A turbo I4
- Transmission: 5-speed manual; 6-speed manual; 4-speed automatic; CVT (2010 model)

Dimensions
- Wheelbase: 2,500 mm (98.4 in)
- Length: 4,115–4,150 mm (162.0–163.4 in) (hatchback); 4,490–4,511 mm (176.8–177.6 in) (sedan)
- Width: 1,730–1,775 mm (68.1–69.9 in)
- Height: 1,575–1,640 mm (62.0–64.6 in) (hatchback); 1,545 mm (60.8 in) (sedan)
- Curb weight: 1,170–1,425 kg (2,579–3,142 lb)

Chronology
- Successor: Suzuki Ciaz (sedan)

The SX4 continues Suzuki's focus on mini SUVs and subcompact SUVs, like the Jimny/SJ and the Vitara/Escudo. The car was created as a result of a joint development agreement between Suzuki and Fiat signed in April 2003. It was introduced in Japan on 1 December 2005, and internationally at the 76th Geneva Motor Show in March 2006. Designed by Giorgetto Giugiaro's Italdesign studio, the SX4 replaces the Aerio (Liana in some markets). Although originally intended solely for Europe, the SX4 is sold in most of Suzuki's international markets. Especially as a 4WD hatchback, the SX4 occupies a specific market niche of mini SUVs. Depending on the market, it was available with petrol engines in the 1.0 to 2.0 L range, and Fiat/Peugeot's 1.3 to 2.0 L diesels.

Based on the Suzuki Swift, it was manufactured at the Magyar Suzuki plant in Esztergom, Hungary; Manesar, India; Bekasi, Indonesia; Chongqing, China and Sagara, Japan. Production in Hungary was expected to be 60,000 units per year — two-thirds to be sold by Suzuki and one-third by Fiat, badged as the Sedici.

The SX4 Crossover had also been sold in Indonesia since 2007. Earlier models were directly imported from Japan and marketed as the SX4 X-Over. However, locally assembled versions were introduced a year later due to higher market demand. The locally assembled versions were then equipped with four-wheel disc brakes and a multi-information display. The Indonesian-produced SX4 was also exported to Thailand. The SX4 sedan was also sold in Indonesia as the Suzuki Neo Baleno from 2008 until 2011.

Engines included the 1.5 L gasoline version that was identical to the one used in the Swift, a 1.6 L gasoline (with VVT) with a maximum output of 102 PS (75 kW; 101 hp) (which powers the SX4 Sedan sold in India by Maruti), the 1.6 L VVT version also used in the new Grand Vitara, and a 107 PS (79 kW; 106 hp), 1.9 L DDIS — along with the Fiat diesel engine with a maximum output of 120 PS (88 kW; 118 hp) and maximum torque of 280 N⋅m (210 lb⋅ft).

The SX4 was initially released as a five-door hatchback body style, marketed as the SX4 Crossover. With a boot space of 300 L (270 L VDA) and 60:40 split-fold rear seats, they have a tumble/roll configuration that allows for a flat load area up to a maximum volume of 1045 L (625 L VDA).

The sedan model, marketed as the SX4 Sport, debuted at the 2007 New York International Auto Show and was released in Japan, India, and a few Eastern European markets. It replaced the Suzuki Aerio sedan and also the Daewoo-based Suzuki Forenza sedan and station wagon.

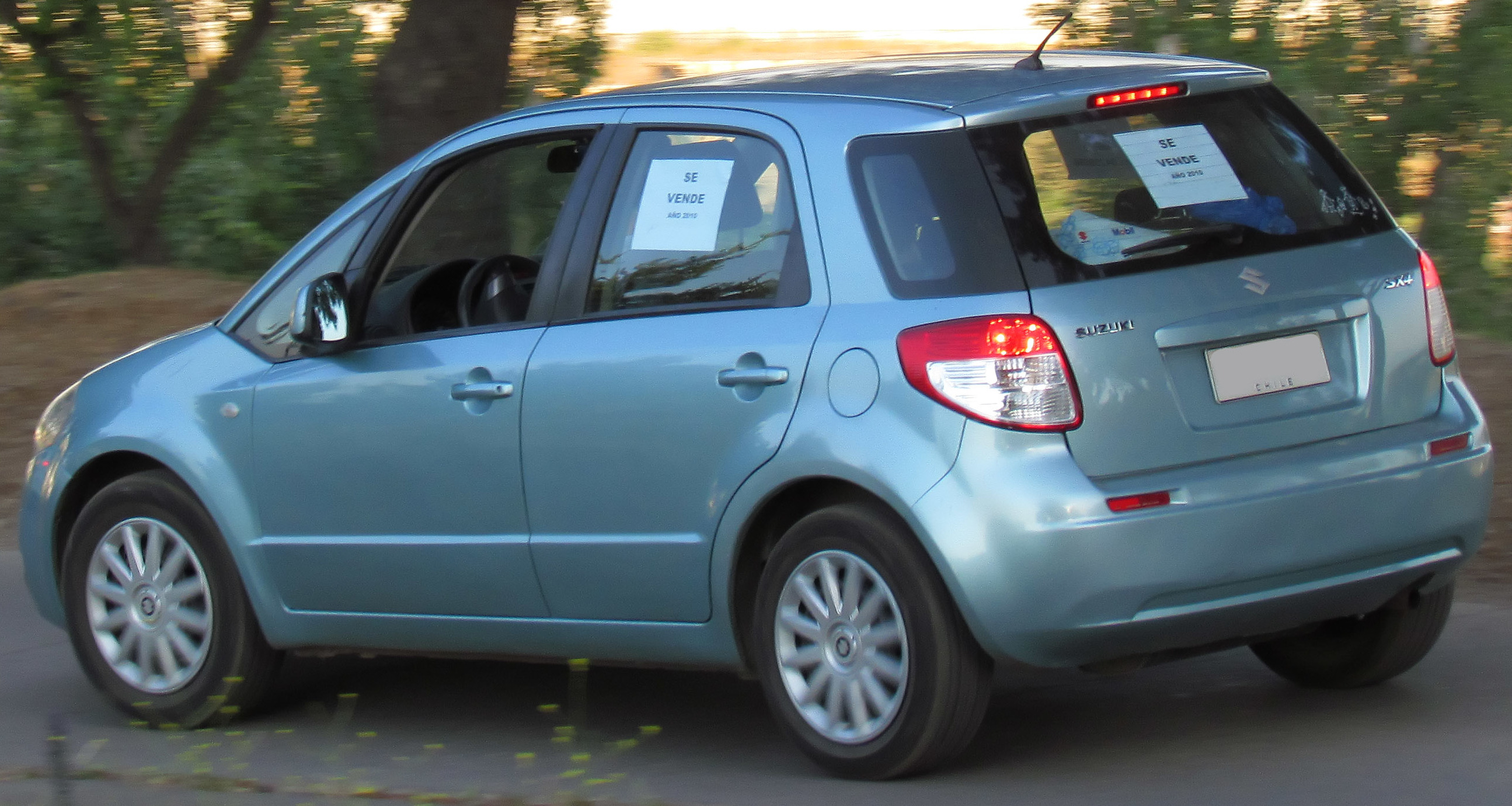
Rear view of Suzuki SX4 hatchback (Chile)

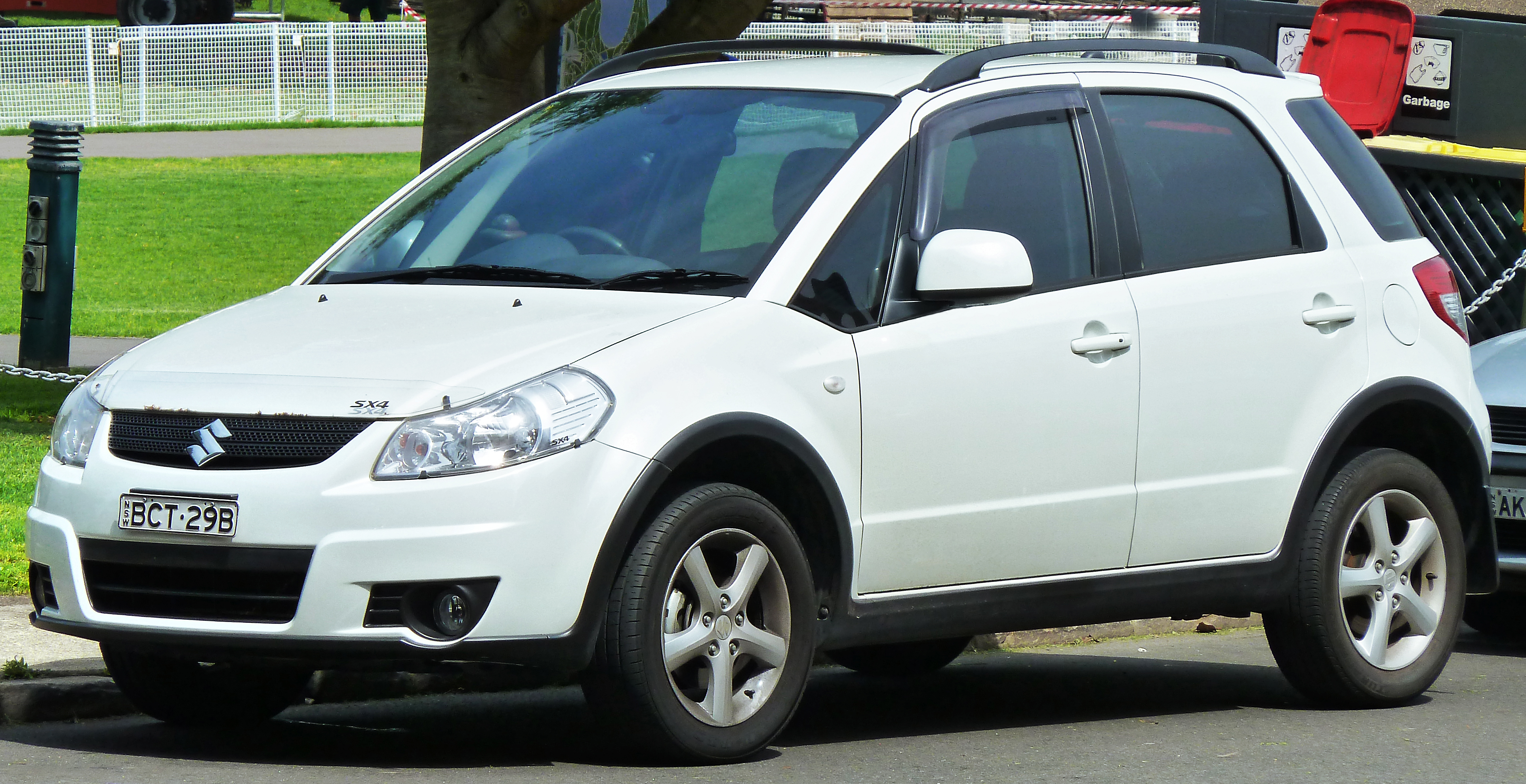
Suzuki SX4 crossover (Australia; pre-facelift)

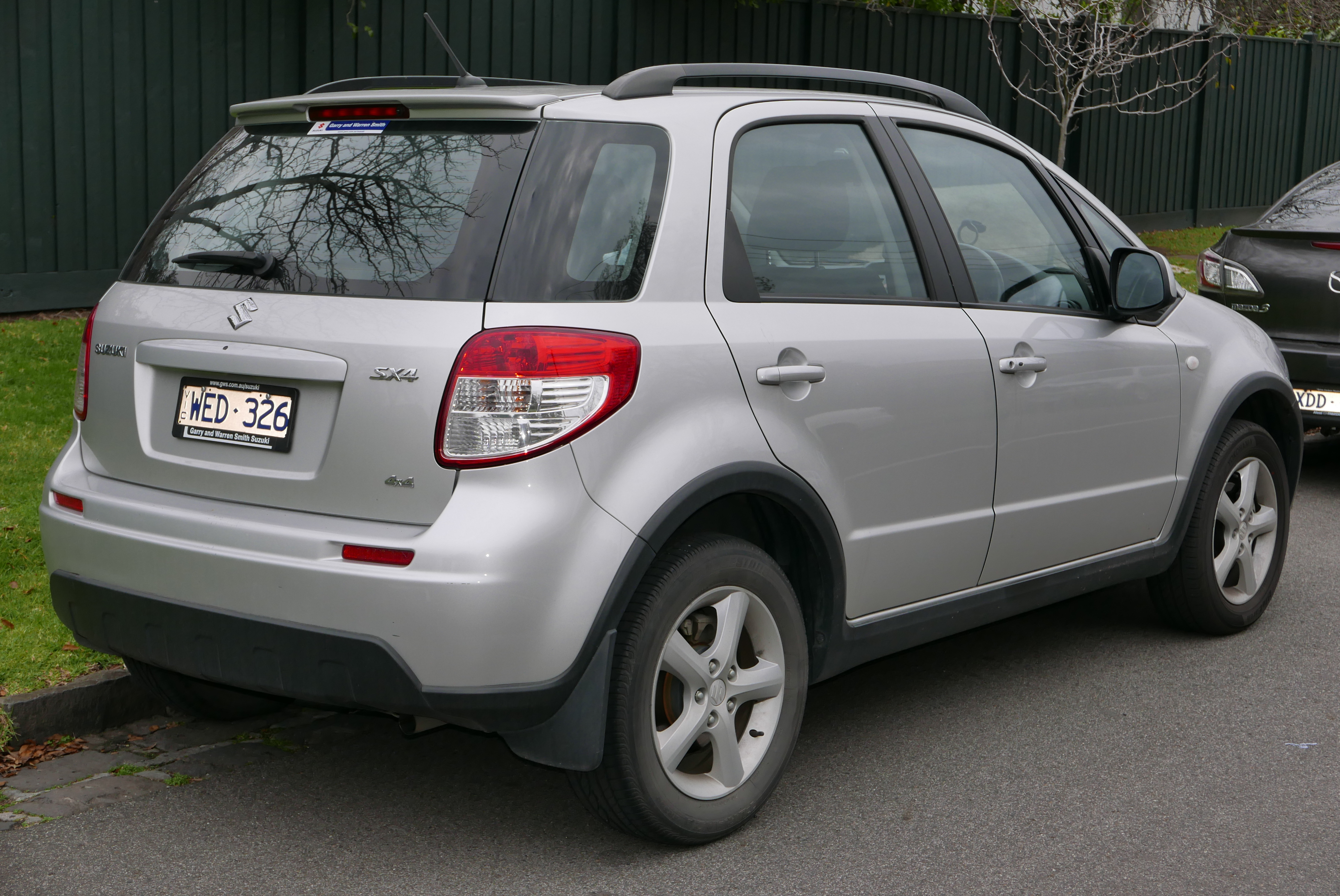
Rear view of Suzuki SX4 crossover (Australia)

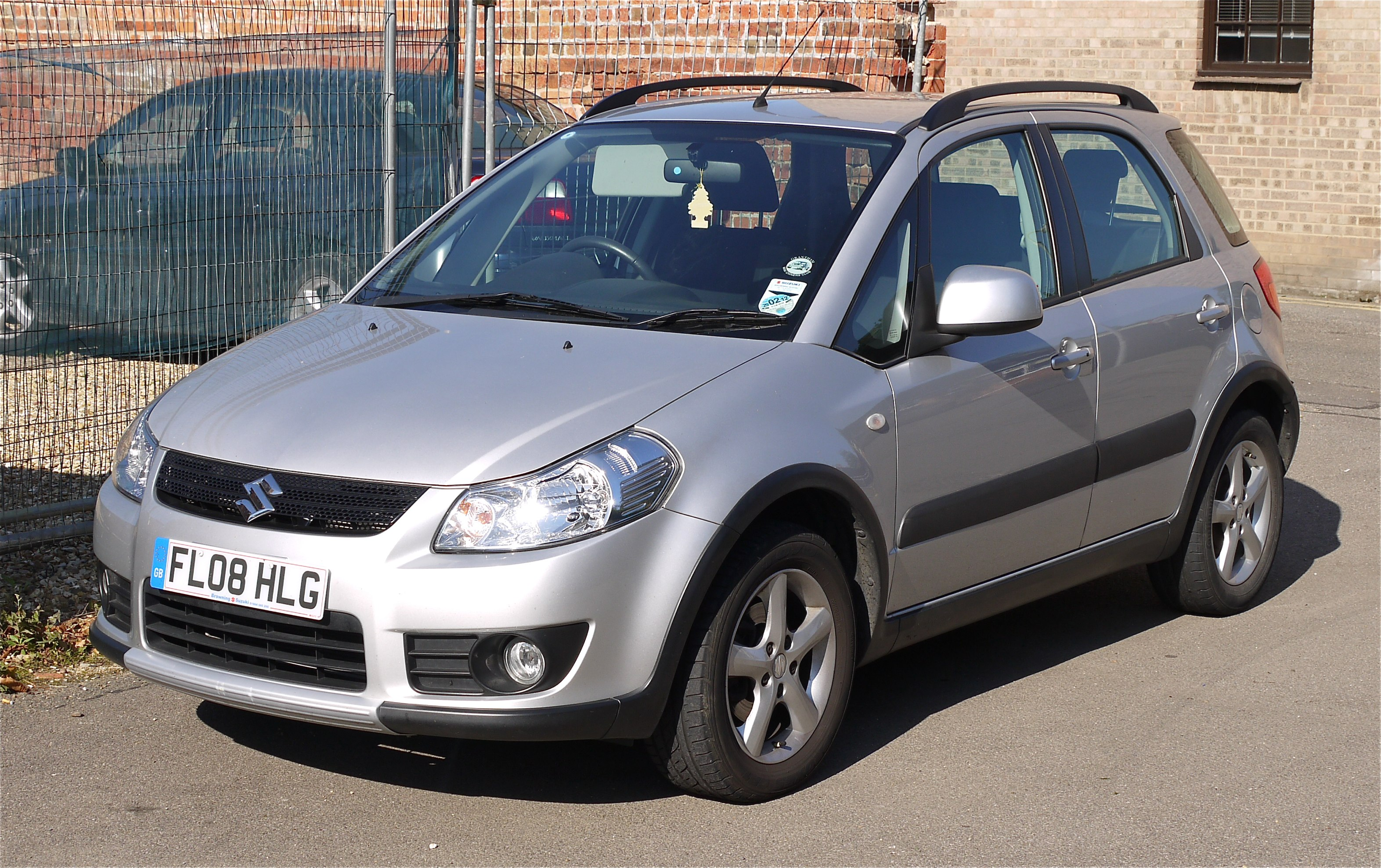
Suzuki SX4 crossover (UK; pre-facelift)

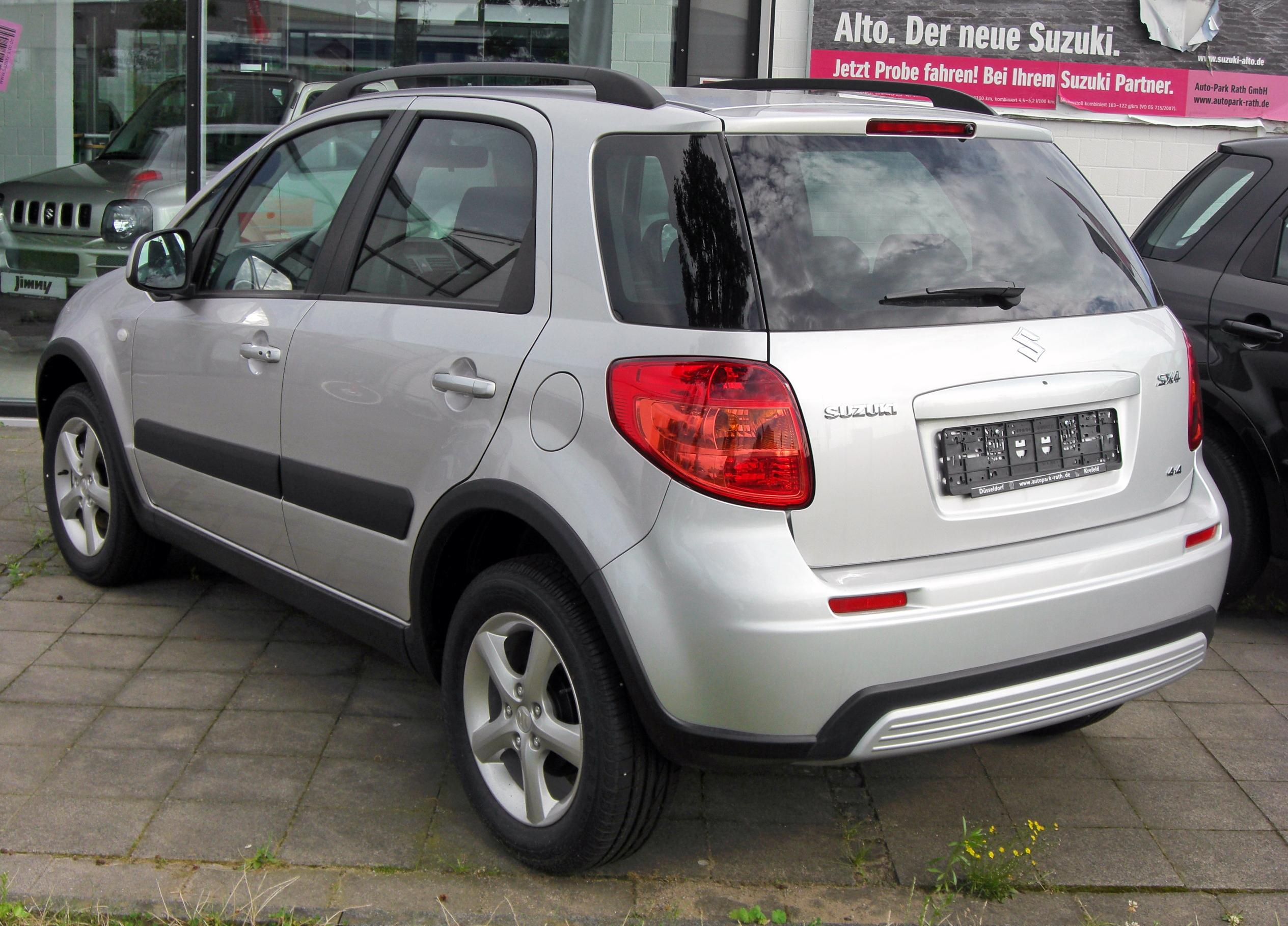
European and facelifted Taiwanese market SX4 tail lights

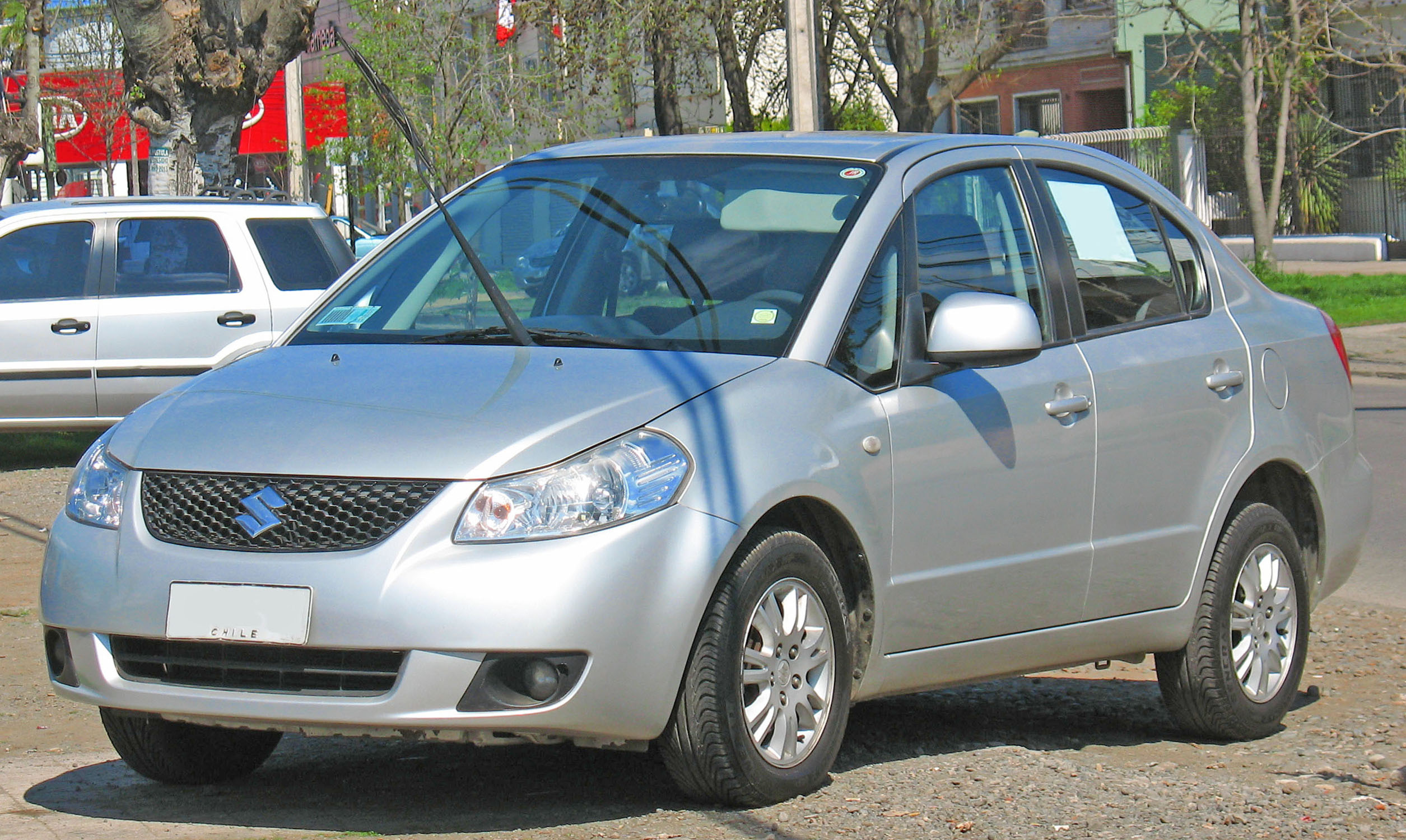
Pre-facelift Suzuki SX4 sedan (Chile)

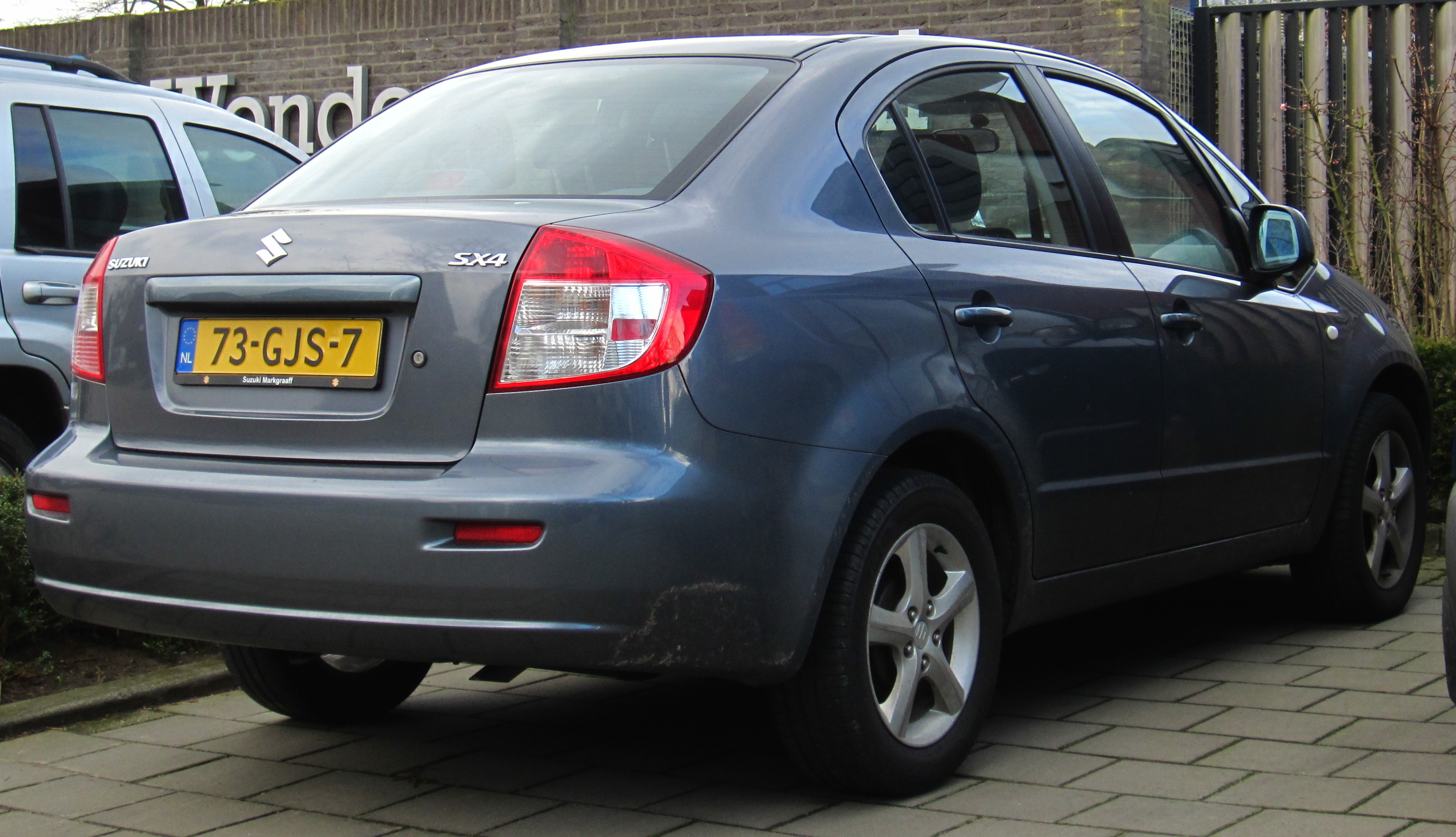
Rear view of Suzuki SX4 sedan (Europe)

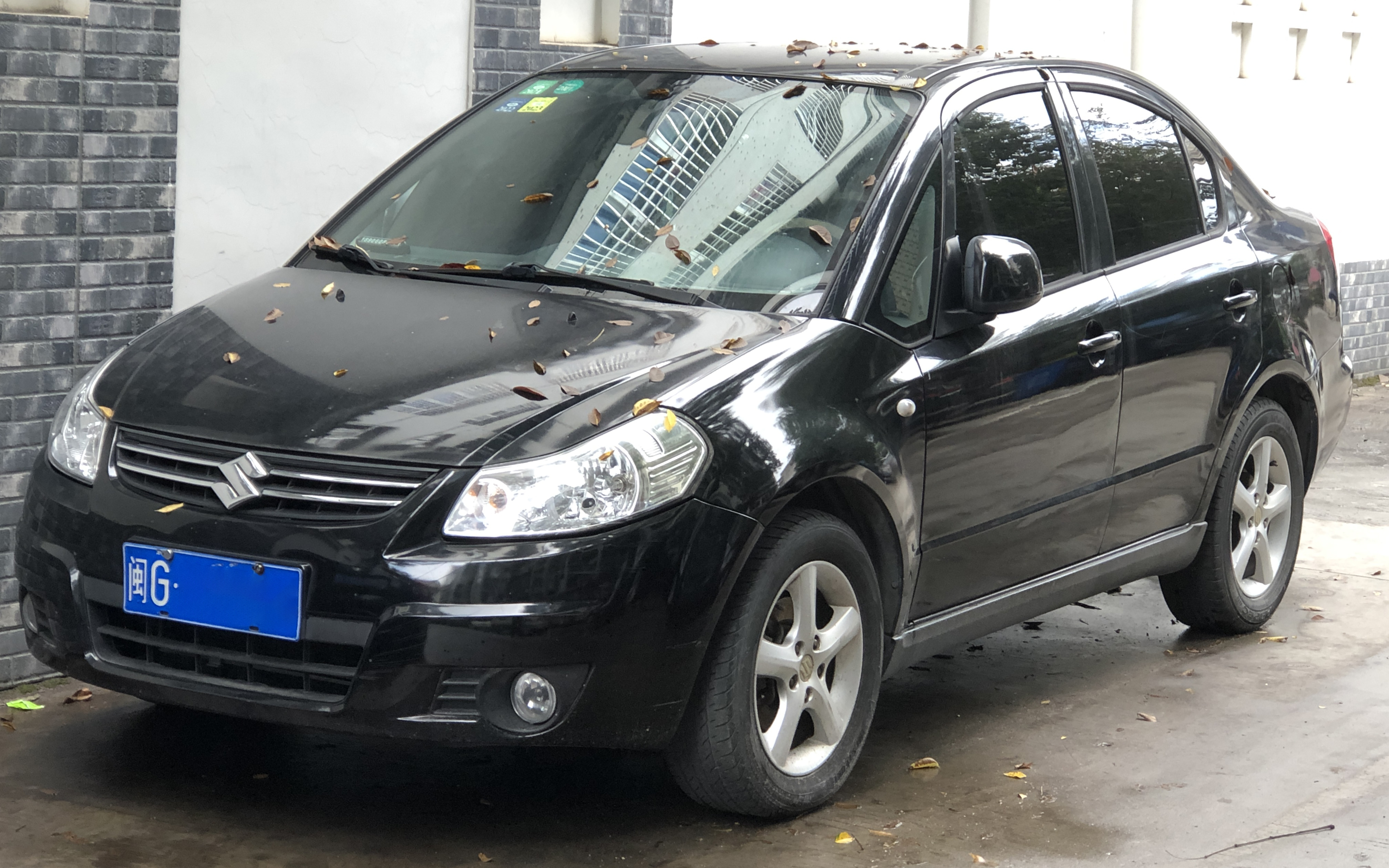
Pre-facelift Suzuki SX4 sedan (China)

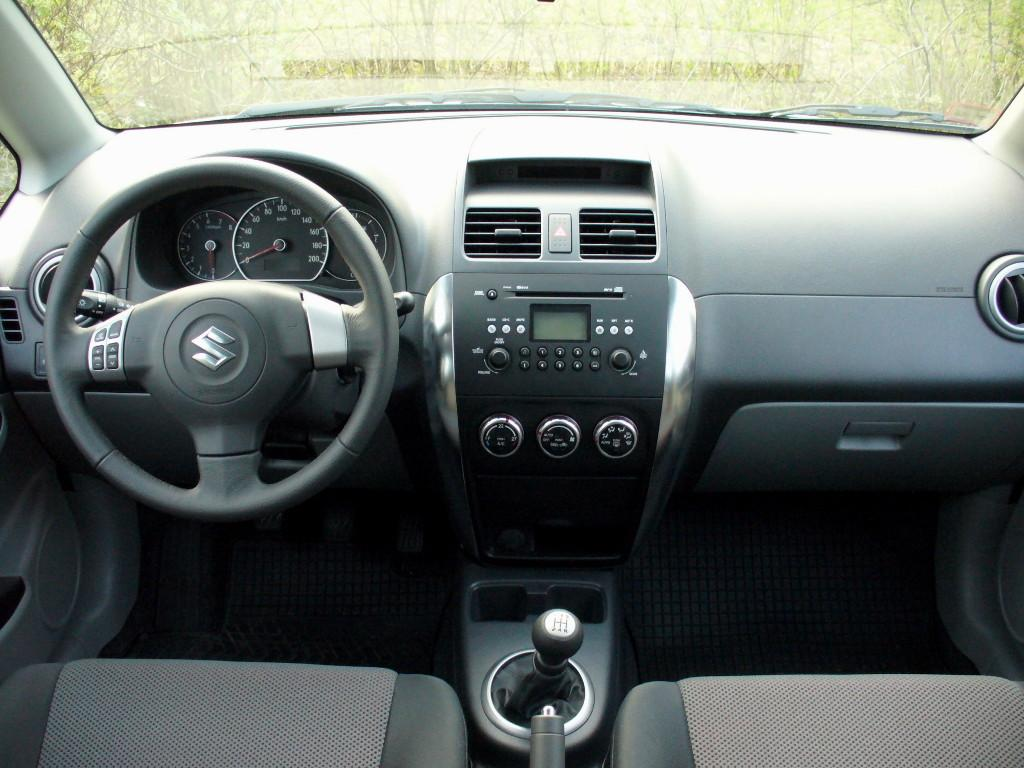
Interior

=== Yearly history ===
2007

The North American market model arrived in 2006 for the 2007 model year, as Suzuki's entry-level AWD vehicle. Differences from the European model are the offering of AWD as standard (2WD Version available in Canada, Europe, Israel, and China while AWD is optional in Canada) and only with the 2.0 L J20A 143 hp (107 kW; 145 PS) I4 gasoline engine with a timing chain instead of a timing belt. The cars were only available with a 4-speed Aisin 60-40LE automatic transmission in 2007.

In 2007, Suzuki Auto posted the best year-end close in company history, with SX4 sales a primary contributor to this success.

2008

The United States base model was the five-door hatchback (marketed as the SX4 Crossover) and included "intelligent" All Wheel Drive (iAWD), power door locks, power windows, power mirrors, CD player with MP3 capability, and keyless entry. Available were anti-lock brakes, traction control, stability control, fog lights, and an advanced key in a Touring package. Suzuki sold nearly 75,000 Suzuki SX4s and Fiat Sedicis in Europe in 2008. This was the second best-selling car in Hungary in 2008, after the Suzuki Swift.

Suzuki Indonesia launched the Suzuki SX4 X-Road, a base variant of the SX4. This version uses rear drum brakes (disc on non-CBU X-Over), unique wheels, a body kit, and no rear spoiler.

2009

The 2009 model year saw SX4 sedans with standard GPS navigation systems manufactured by Garmin with Bluetooth, weather, and a gas station locator.

The United States sedan of the SX4 (marketed as the SX4 Sport) is only available in front-wheel drive (FWD). Except for the absence of iAWD, the option packages for the SX4 Sport closely matched those available for the SX4 Crossover. The sedan's boot has 515 liters of cargo capacity.

Both the 1.6 L FWD hatchback and 1.6 L FWD sedan models began sale in Malaysia, being fully imported from Japan.

Both two-wheel drive and all-wheel drive versions of the SX4 are available, although not all combinations of drivetrain and body style may be available in a given market (for instance, until the latter part of the model year of 2008, the United States SX4 Crossover was only available with iAWD). The AWD models use an electronically controlled iAWD three-mode four-wheel drive system, user-selectable between front-wheel drive 2WD mode, automatic AWD AUTO mode, and AWD LOCK 50:50 split permanent AWD LOCK mode, which can only be used up to 64 km/h (40 mph), after that, it switches to AWD AUTO mode.

2010

The 2010 SX4 received changes to the grille, instrument cluster, climate controls, and door trim, as well as a restructured cargo hold, removing the fold-up rear seats in favor of an 'arena seating' raised rear seat layout. Non-fleet all-wheel-drive models added new rear skid plates. They were also upgraded with front (ventilated) and rear (solid) disc brakes, six airbags (front, side, and curtain), Anti-lock Braking System (ABS), cruise control and Electronic Stability Program (ESP) - optional in 1.6 L models.

A SportBack model offered a lowered sport-tuned suspension, a body kit, and a rear spoiler but does not include a roof rack.

Since the 2010 model year, the SX4 five-door hatchback is available with a 1.6 L DOHC VVT engine, 2.0 L DOHC VVT engine J20B (different from the J20A used from 2007 through 2009, and thus not interchangeable), and a 2.0 L DDiS diesel engine (16-valve, 135 PS (99 kW; 133 hp) with 320 N⋅m (240 lb⋅ft) torque) on the AWD version.

The 1.6 L DOHC VVT engine was revised to the new CO_{2} emission control standards, Euro 5 regulations. Engine power was increased from 107 to 120 PS (79 to 88 kW; 106 to 118 hp). The U.S.-market cars received a new 2.0 L engine (J20B) with output increased from 143 to 150 PS (105 to 110 kW; 141 to 148 hp), and features lower fuel consumption.

The car is available with either a new six-speed manual or a four-speed automatic transmission for 1.6 L engine cars. The continuously variable transmission (CVT) with paddle shifters comes with a 2.0 L inline-four engine and is rated 148 hp (110 kW; 150 PS) at 6000 rpm. With the standard six-speed manual transmission, the same engine is rated 150 hp (112 kW; 152 PS) at 6200 rpm.

The Indonesian-market SX4 received updates, including a new speedometer, a redesigned dashboard, new road wheels, grille design, mid-bass speaker, HID projector headlamps, and an AUX port on the head unit. The X-Road variant was discontinued due to low sales.

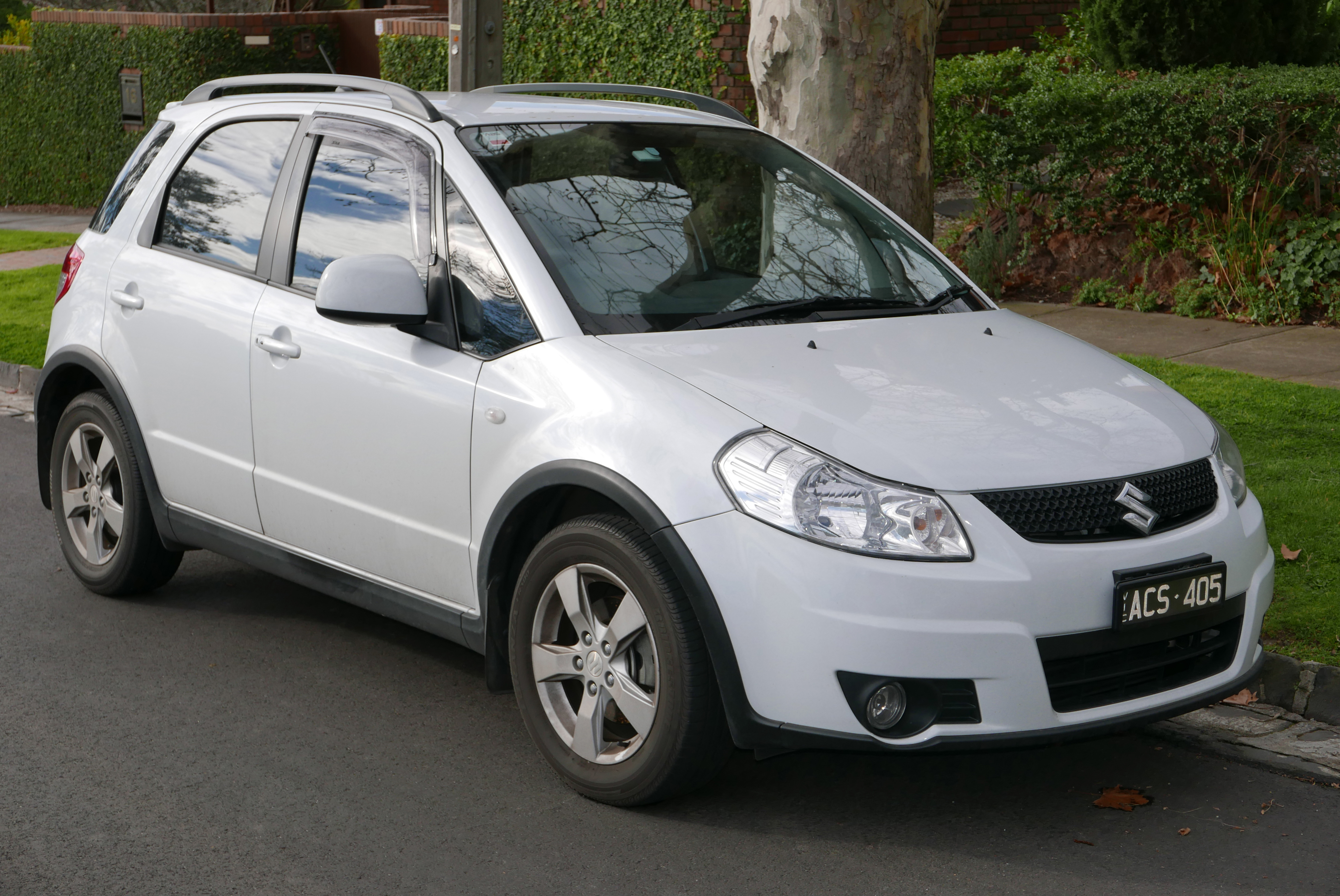
First facelift Suzuki SX4 crossover (Australia)

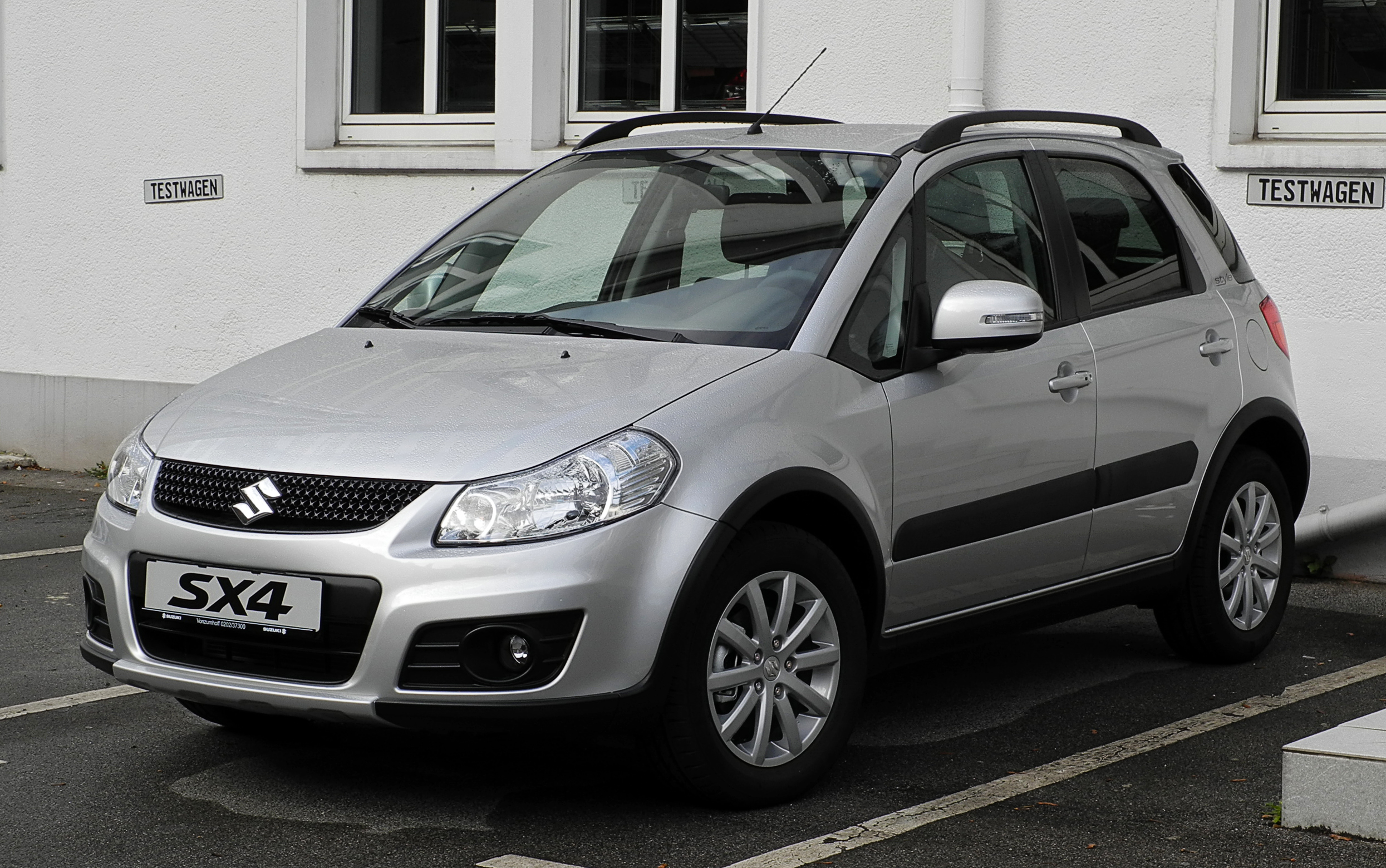
Facelift European market Suzuki SX4 crossover

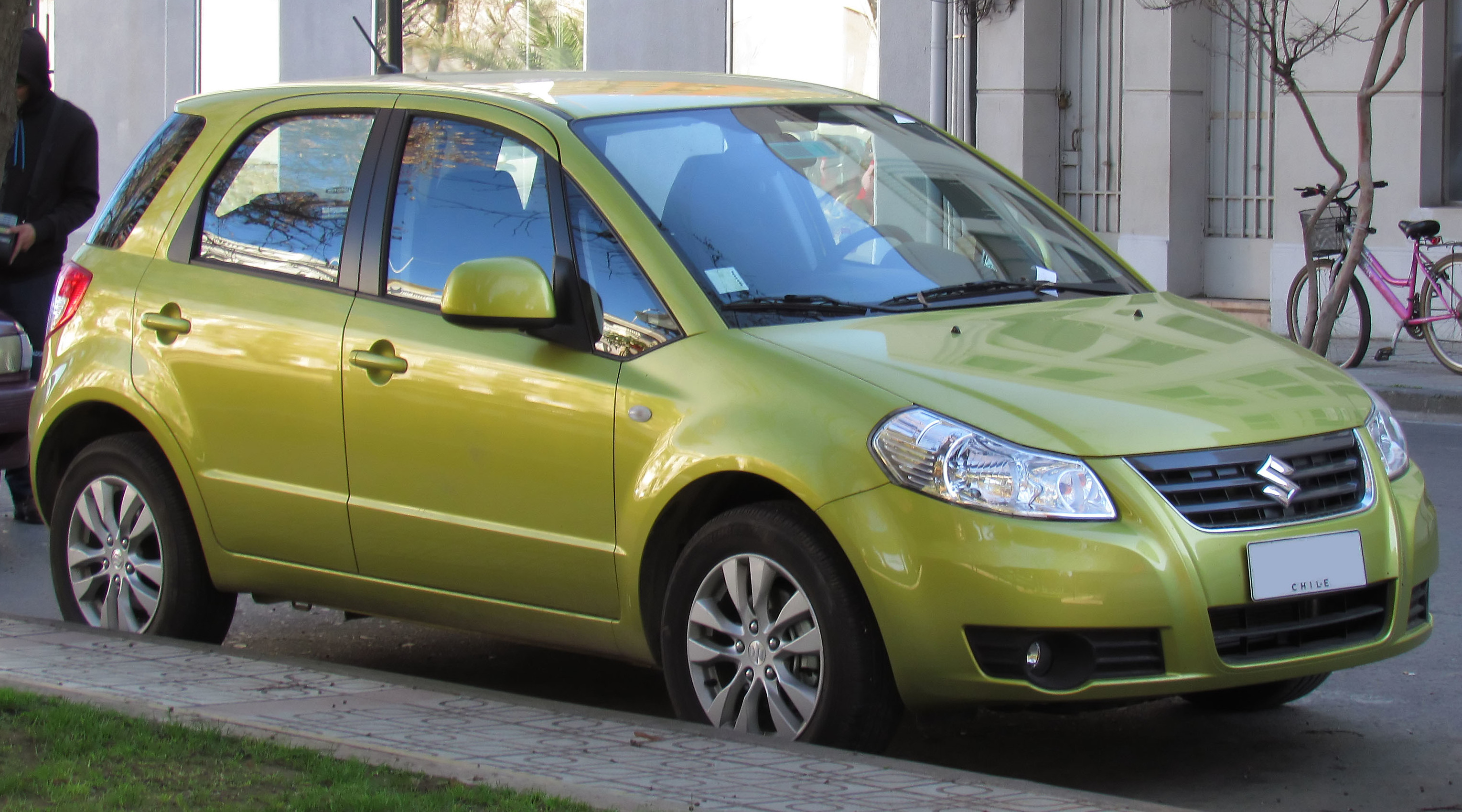
Second facelift Suzuki SX4 hatchback (Chile)

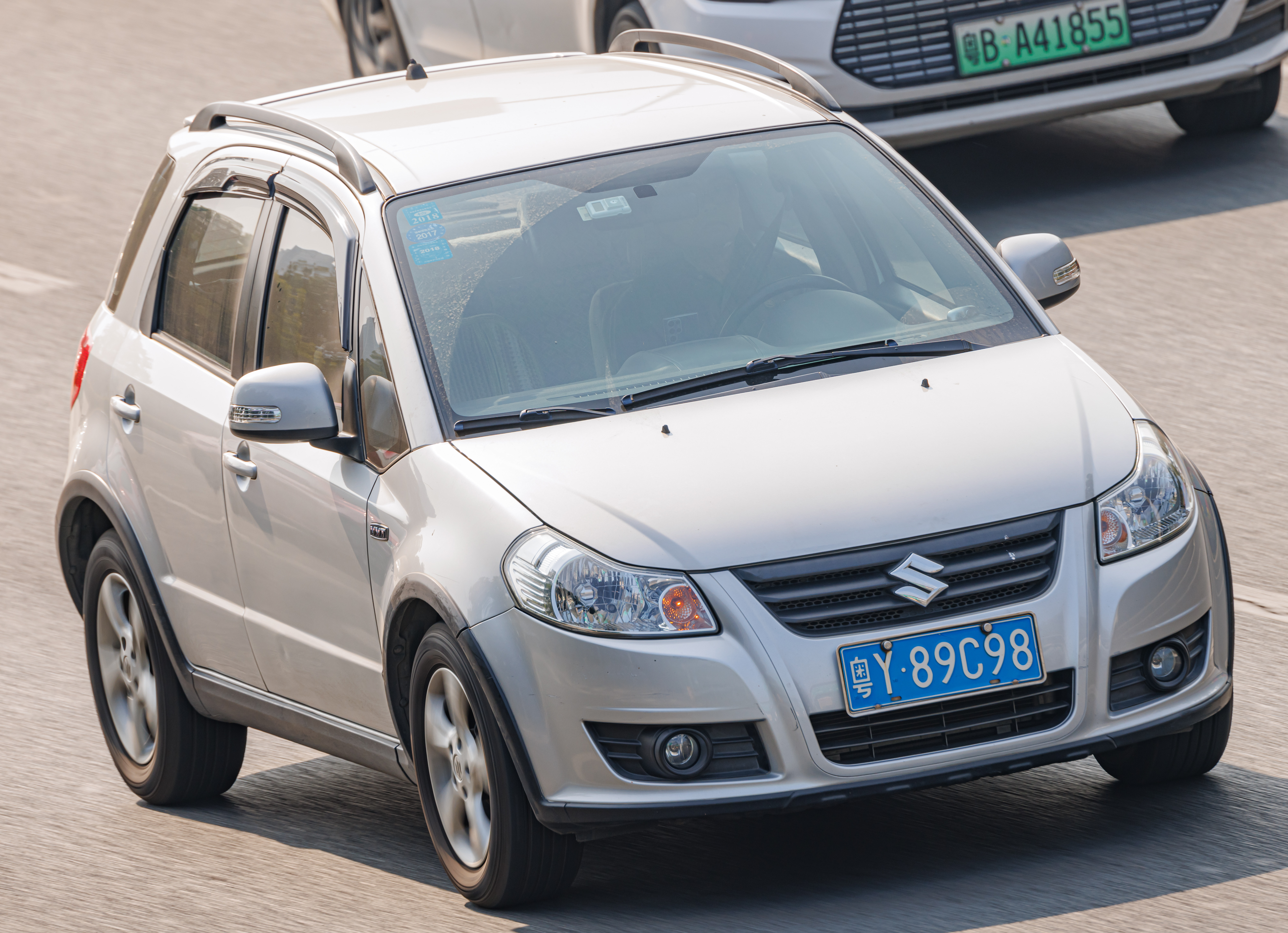
Second facelift Suzuki SX4 crossover (China)

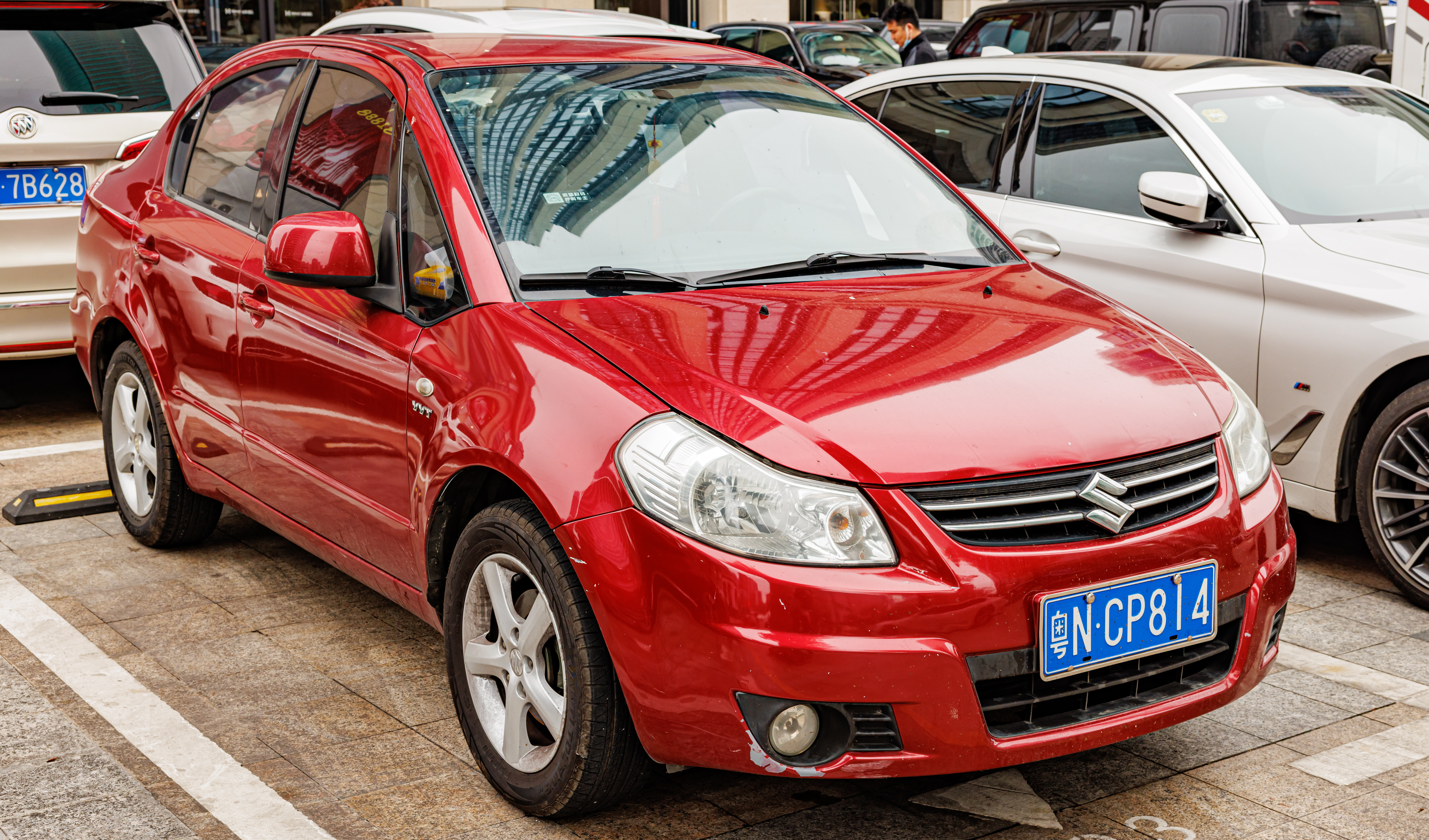
Facelift Suzuki SX4 sedan (China)

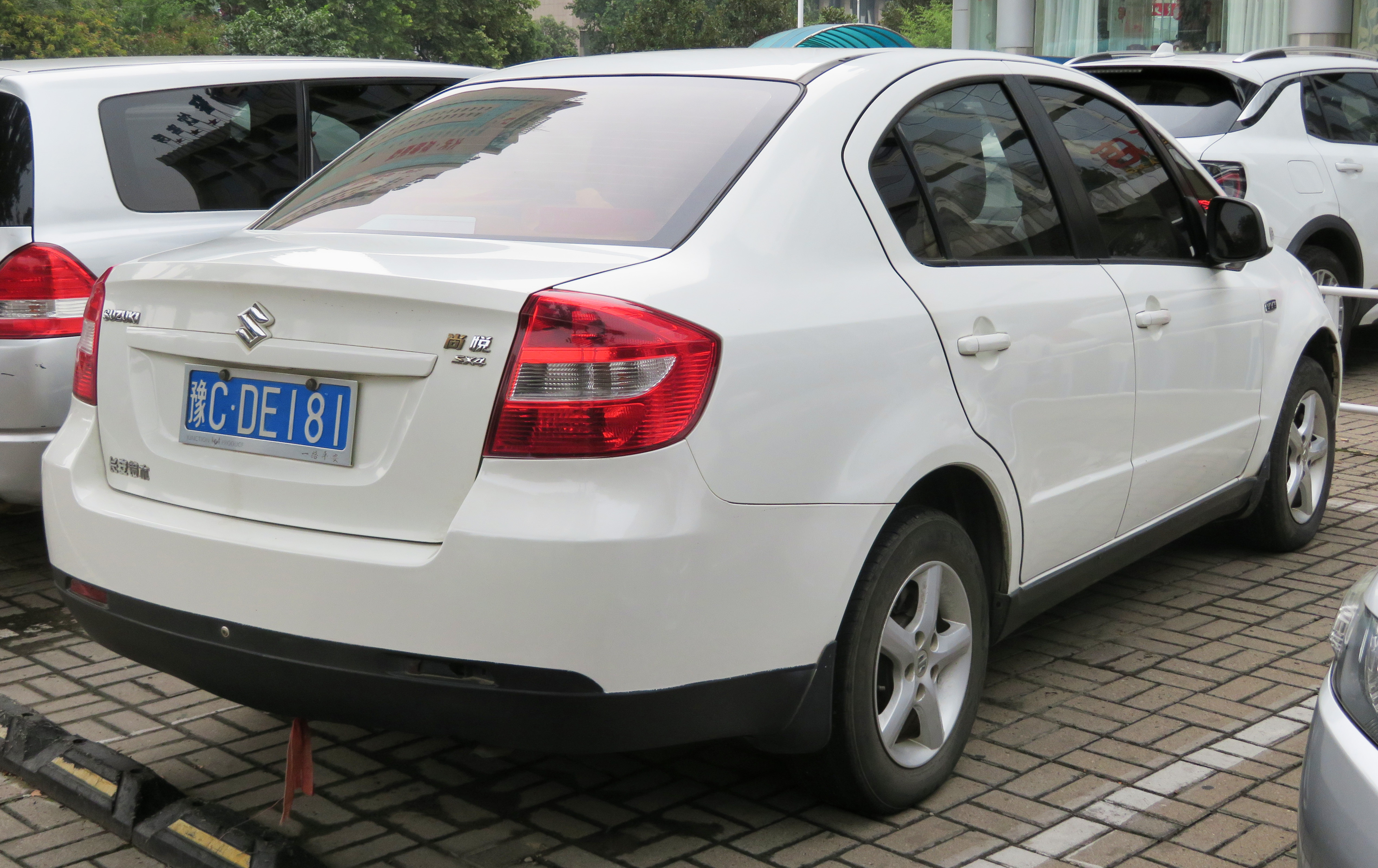
Facelift Suzuki SX4 sedan (China)

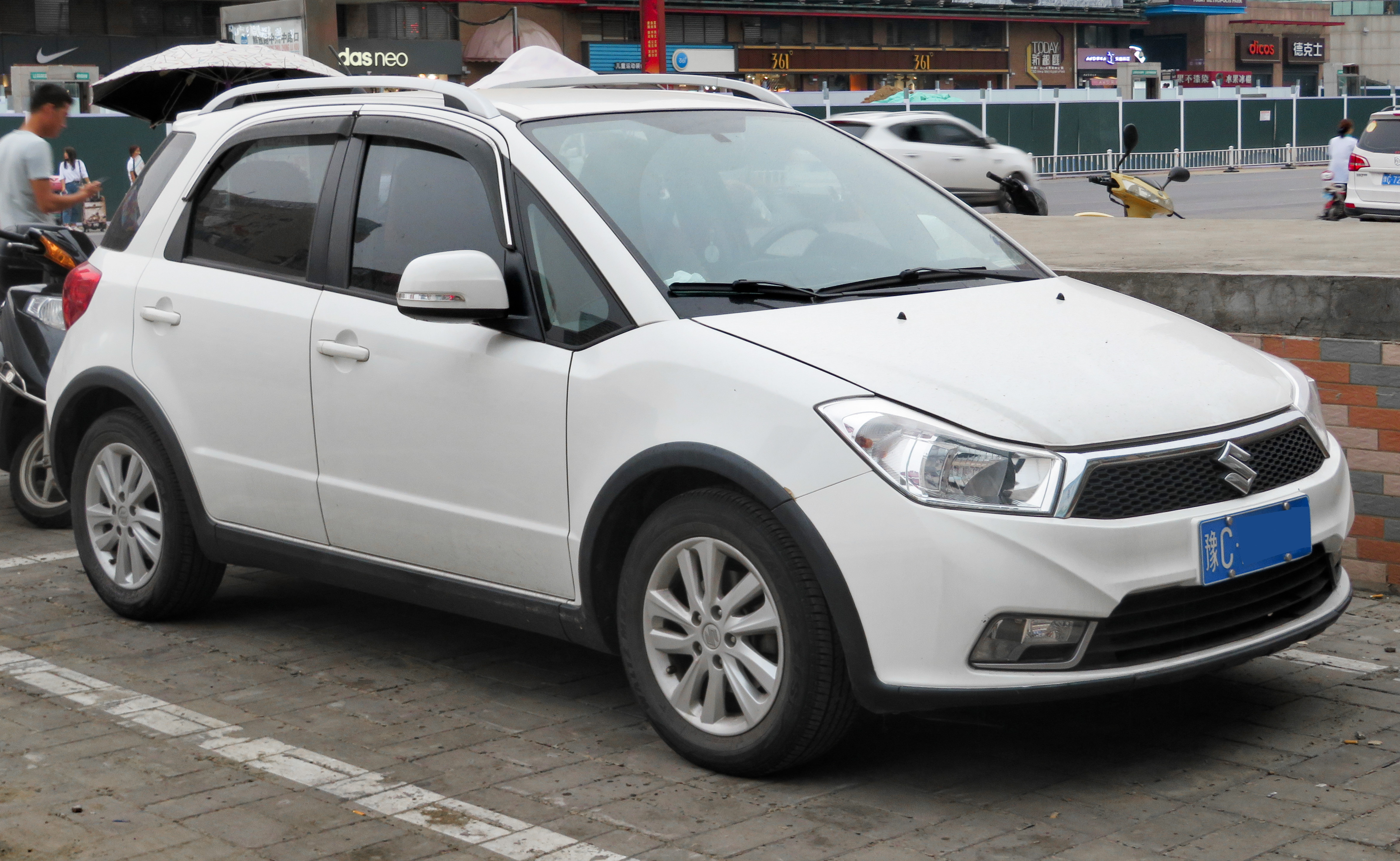
Third facelift Suzuki SX4 hatchback (China)

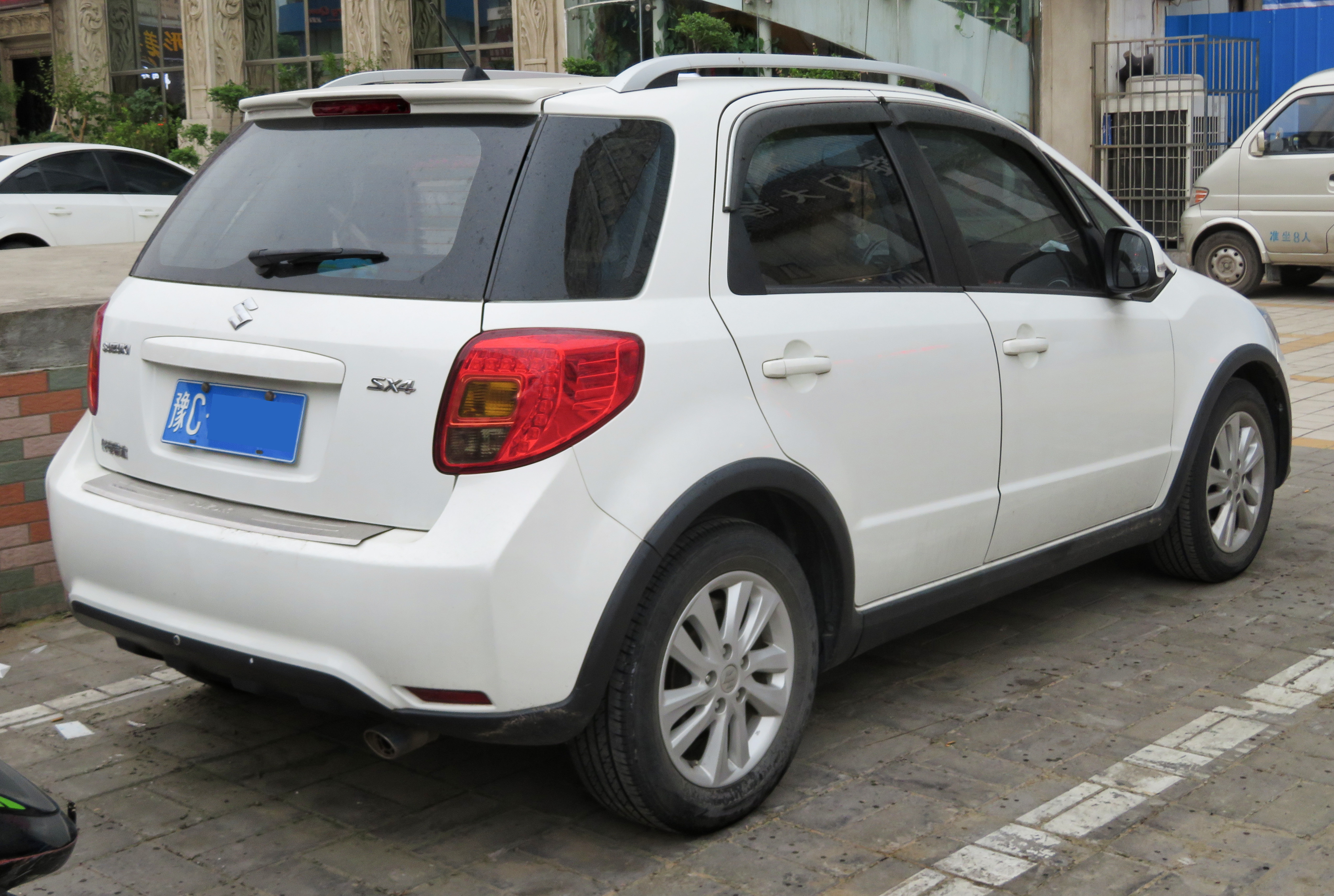
Third facelift Suzuki SX4 hatchback (China)

2012

Suzuki Indonesia launched a new variant, named RC1. The SX4 RC1 included more accessories, such as new bumpers, a rear upper spoiler, twin mufflers, 17-inch wheels, and LED headlamps.

Stability control and rear disc brakes became standard on all US models, including FWD models (previously were standard only on AWD models).

The second facelift occurred with a new front bumper and a wider grille.

2013

Navigation was added as an optional feature on US models, and the front fascia was redesigned. This was the last model year for US and Canadian sales.

2014

Last model year for this generation in most other markets except for China.

=== Engines ===
Model	Displacement	Cylinder	Power	Torque	Top speed	Consumption	Years
Petrol engines
1.5 VVT 2WD	1,490 cc (91 cu in)	4	99 PS (73 kW; 98 hp) at 5600 rpm	133 N⋅m (98 lb⋅ft) at 4000 rpm	175 km/h (109 mph)	7.1 L/100 km (40 mpg_{‑imp}; 33 mpg_{‑US})	2006–2012
1.6 2WD	1,586 cc (96.8 cu in)	4	107 PS (79 kW; 106 hp) at 5600 rpm	147 N⋅m (108 lb⋅ft) at 4000 rpm	180 km/h (112 mph)	6.8 L/100 km (42 mpg_{‑imp}; 35 mpg_{‑US})	2006–2009
1.6 i-AWD	1,586 cc (96.8 cu in)	4	107 PS (79 kW; 106 hp) at 5600 rpm	147 N⋅m (108 lb⋅ft) at 4000 rpm	170 km/h (106 mph)	7.1 L/100 km (40 mpg_{‑imp}; 33 mpg_{‑US})	2006–2009
1.6 VVT 2WD	1,586 cc (96.8 cu in)	4	120 PS (88 kW; 118 hp) at 6000 rpm	156 N⋅m (115 lb⋅ft) at 4400 rpm	185 km/h (115 mph)	6.2 L/100 km (46 mpg_{‑imp}; 38 mpg_{‑US})	2009–2014
1.6 VVT i-AWD	1,586 cc (96.8 cu in)	4	120 PS (88 kW; 118 hp) at 6000 rpm	156 N⋅m (115 lb⋅ft) at 4400 rpm	175 km/h (109 mph)	6.5 L/100 km (43 mpg_{‑imp}; 36 mpg_{‑US})	2009–2014
1.8 VVT 2WD	1,796 cc (109.6 cu in)	4	131 PS (96 kW; 129 hp) at 6200 rpm	170 N⋅m (130 lb⋅ft) at 4000 rpm	190 km/h (118 mph)	7.0 l/100 km (40 mpg_{‑imp}; 34 mpg_{‑US})	2009–2012 China only
2.0 2WD/iAWD	1,995 cc (121.7 cu in)	4	145 PS (107 kW; 143 hp) at 5870 rpm	189 N⋅m (139 lb⋅ft) at 3500 rpm	-		2007-2009
2.0 VVT 2WD	1,995 cc (121.7 cu in)	4	152 PS (112 kW; 150 hp) at 6200 rpm	190 N⋅m (140 lb⋅ft) at 4000 rpm	195 km/h (121 mph)	7.3 L/100 km (39 mpg_{‑imp}; 32 mpg_{‑US})	2010–2014
2.0 VVT i-AWD	1,995 cc (121.7 cu in)	4	152 PS (112 kW; 150 hp) at 6200 rpm	190 N⋅m (140 lb⋅ft) at 4000 rpm	184 km/h (114 mph)	7.6 L/100 km (37 mpg_{‑imp}; 31 mpg_{‑US})	2010–2014
Diesel engines
1.6 DDiS 2WD	1,560 cc (95 cu in)	4	90 PS (66 kW; 89 hp) at 4000 rpm	215 N⋅m (159 lb⋅ft) at 1750 rpm	170 km/h (106 mph)	6.4 L/100 km (44 mpg_{‑imp}; 37 mpg_{‑US})	2007–2008
1.9 DDiS 2WD	1,910 cc (117 cu in)	4	120 PS (88 kW; 118 hp) at 3500 rpm	280 N⋅m (210 lb⋅ft) at 2000 rpm	190 km/h (118 mph)	6.3 L/100 km (45 mpg_{‑imp}; 37 mpg_{‑US})	2006–2009
1.9 DDiS i-AWD	1,910 cc (117 cu in)	4	120 PS (88 kW; 118 hp) at 3500 rpm	280 N⋅m (210 lb⋅ft) at 2000 rpm	180 km/h (112 mph)	6.6 L/100 km (43 mpg_{‑imp}; 36 mpg_{‑US})	2006–2009
2.0 DDiS 2WD	1,956 cc (119.4 cu in)	4	135 PS (99 kW; 133 hp) at 4000 rpm	320 N⋅m (240 lb⋅ft) at 1500 rpm	190 km/h (118 mph)	4.9 L/100 km (58 mpg_{‑imp}; 48 mpg_{‑US})	2009–2014
2.0 DDiS i-AWD	1,956 cc (119.4 cu in)	4	135 PS (99 kW; 133 hp) at 4000 rpm	320 N⋅m (240 lb⋅ft) at 1500 rpm	180 km/h (112 mph)	5.5 L/100 km (51 mpg_{‑imp}; 43 mpg_{‑US})	2009–2014

- i-AWD=Intelligent All Wheel Drive System

=== Maruti Suzuki version ===
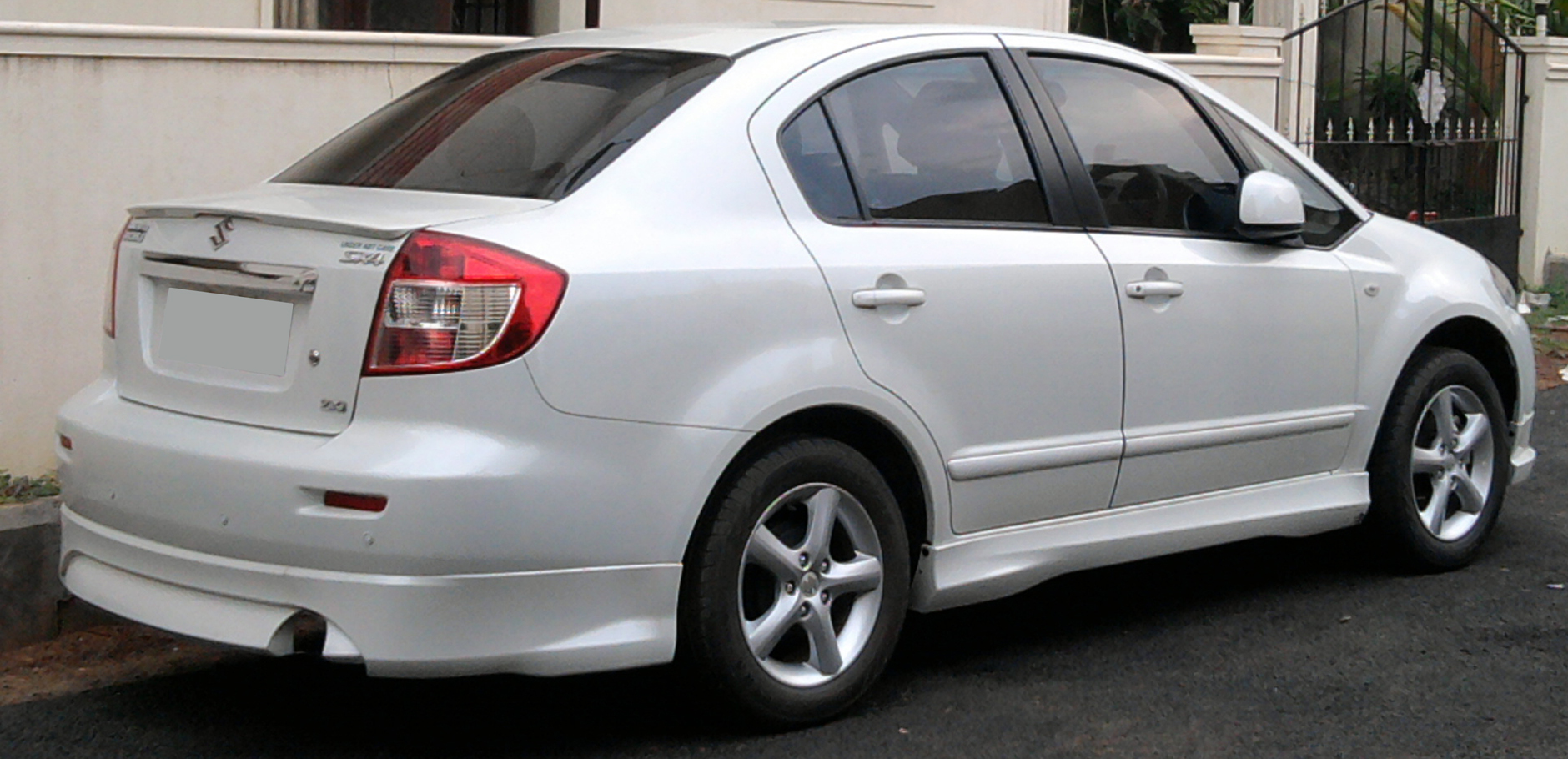
Maruti Suzuki SX4

In 2007, Maruti Suzuki launched the Indian version of the SX4 sedan with minor cosmetic differences compared to the models assembled and marketed elsewhere.

The cars were initially equipped with the 1.6 L gasoline engine, without VVT, with 102 PS (75 kW; 101 hp) at 5,600 rpm and 140 N⋅m (100 lb⋅ft) of torque at 4,000 rpm. It was later updated to the 1.6 L engine with VVT.

Maruti introduced a compressed natural gas (CNG) factory-fitted kit in August 2010.

In February 2011, a diesel version was introduced. It uses the Fiat 1.3 L (DDiS) engine with variable geometry turbo.

Model	Displacement	Cylinder	Power	Torque	Top speed	Consumption	Years
Petrol engine
1.6 VVT 2WD	1,586 cc (96.8 cu in)	4	105 PS (77 kW; 104 hp) at 5600 rpm CNG mode: 87 PS (64 kW; 86 hp) at 5600 rpm	145 N⋅m (107 lb⋅ft) at 4100 rpm CNG mode: 122 N⋅m (90 lb⋅ft) at 4000 rpm	180 km/h (112 mph); CNG mode: 170 km/h (106 mph)	6.8 L/100 km (42 mpg_{‑imp}; 35 mpg_{‑US}); CNG mode: 4.8 kg/100 km (21 km/kg; 6 mi/lb)	since 2008; CNG kit: since 2010
Diesel engine
1.3 DDiS 2WD	1,248 cc (76.2 cu in)	4	90 PS (66 kW; 89 hp) at 4000 rpm	200 N⋅m (150 lb⋅ft) at 1750 rpm	170 km/h (106 mph)	4.7 L/100 km (60 mpg_{‑imp}; 50 mpg_{‑US})	since 2011

=== SX4-FCV ===
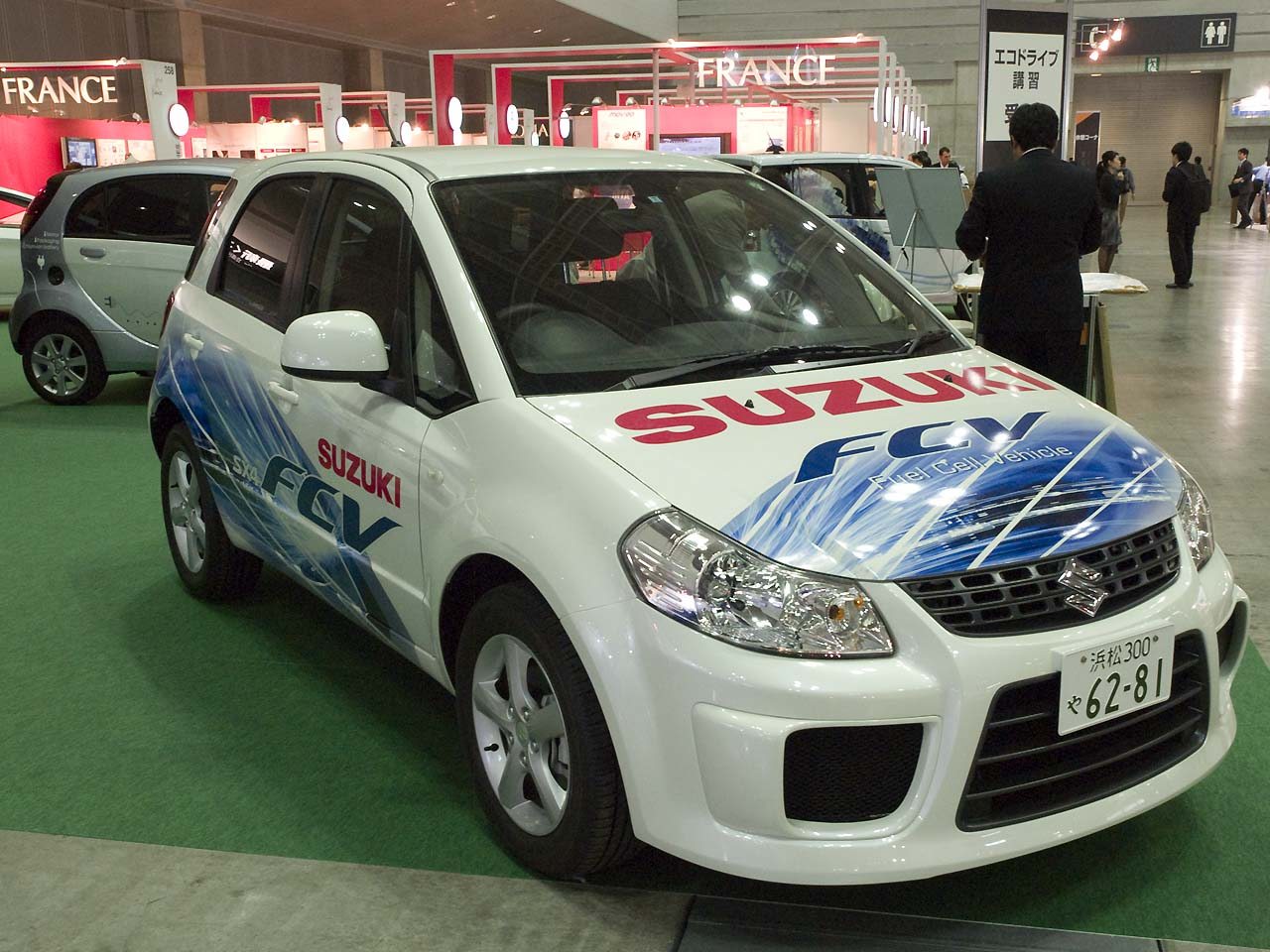
Suzuki SX4-FCV (Fuel-Cell Vehicle) shown at 2009 Automotive Engineering Exposition in Yokohama, Japan

An experimental Suzuki concept car using alternative power includes an 80 kW hydrogen fuel cell and 68 kW electric motor. The car has a top speed of 150 km/h (93 mph) with 250 km range. The car was unveiled in 2008 Hokkaido Tōyako summit, and later in 2008 Paris International Motor Show.

=== Suzuki SX4 WRC ===
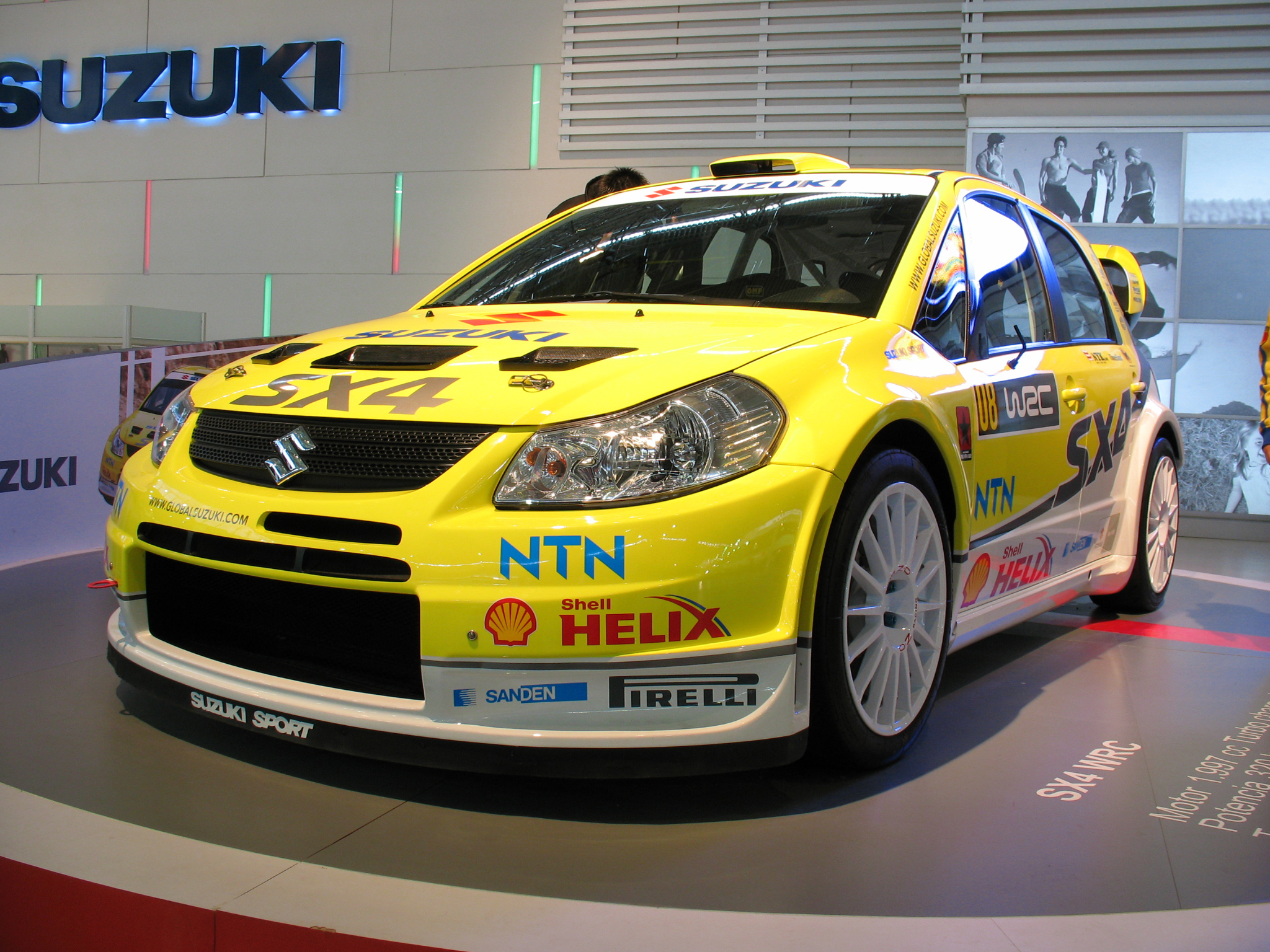
Suzuki SX4 WRC

At the 2007 Geneva Motor Show, Suzuki announced it would enter the FIA World Rally Championship, with the factory-backed Suzuki World Rally Team in the World Rally Car category in 2007, using the Suzuki SX4 WRC.

=== Safety ===
The SX4 achieved four stars safety rating from Euro NCAP in 2006.

ANCAP test results* Suzuki SX4 5 door hatch (2007)
Test	Score
Overall	4 /5 stars
Frontal offset	11.33/16
Side impact	16/16
Pole	2/2
Seat belt reminders	0/3
Whiplash protection	Not Assessed
Pedestrian protection	Adequate
Electronic stability control	Not Available

== Second generation (JY; 2013) ==
Second generation
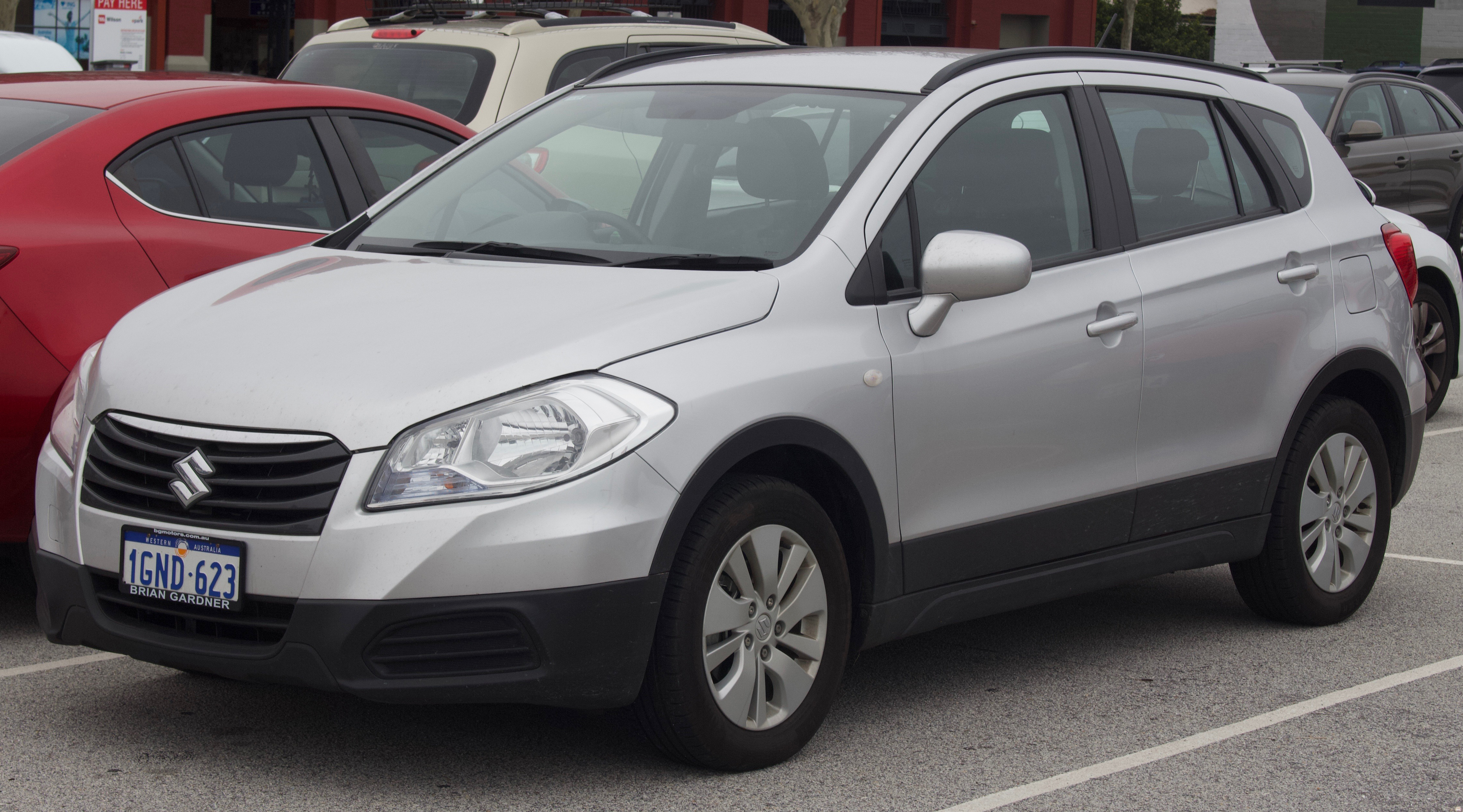
- Pre-facelift Suzuki SX4 S-Cross GL (Australia)

Overview
- Model code: JY
- Also called: Suzuki S-Cross; Chevrolet SX4 S-Cross (Ecuador); Suzuki Crossover SX4 S-Cross (Israel); Suzuki SX4 Crossover (Taiwan; pre-facelift)
- Production: 2013–2021 (Hungary); 2013–2018 (China); 2015–2022 (India)
- Assembly: Hungary: Esztergom (Magyar Suzuki); China: Chongqing (Changan Suzuki); India: Gurgaon (Maruti Suzuki)

Body and chassis
- Class: Subcompact crossover SUV
- Body style: 5-door SUV
- Layout: Front-engine, front-wheel-drive or four-wheel-drive
- Platform: Suzuki Global C platform
- Related: Suzuki Vitara (LY); Suzuki Vitara Brezza; Suzuki Ciaz

Powertrain
- Engine: Petrol: 1.0 L K10C turbo I3; 1.4 L K14C turbo I4; 1.4 L K14D MHEV turbo I4 (Europe); 1.5 L M15A I4 (Indonesia); 1.5 L K15B MHEV I4 (India); 1.6 L M16A I4; Diesel: 1.3 L D13A DDiS TD I4 (India); 1.3 L D13A DDiS MHEV TD I4 (India); 1.6 L D16A DDiS TD I4 (Europe/India)
- Electric motor: WA06B (Europe) DC synchronous Integrated Starter Generator (ISG)
- Transmission: 5-speed manual; 6-speed manual; CVT; 4-speed automatic; 6-speed automatic; 6-speed DCT "TCSS"
- Hybrid drivetrain: 12 or 48V SHVS mild hybrid
- Battery: Lithium-ion

Dimensions
- Wheelbase: 2,600 mm (102.4 in)
- Length: 4,300 mm (169.3 in)
- Width: 1,765–1,785 mm (69.5–70.3 in)
- Height: 1,575–1,585 mm (62.0–62.4 in)
- Curb weight: 1,090–1,380 kg (2,400–3,040 lb)

Chronology
- Successor: Suzuki Grand Vitara (2022) (India)

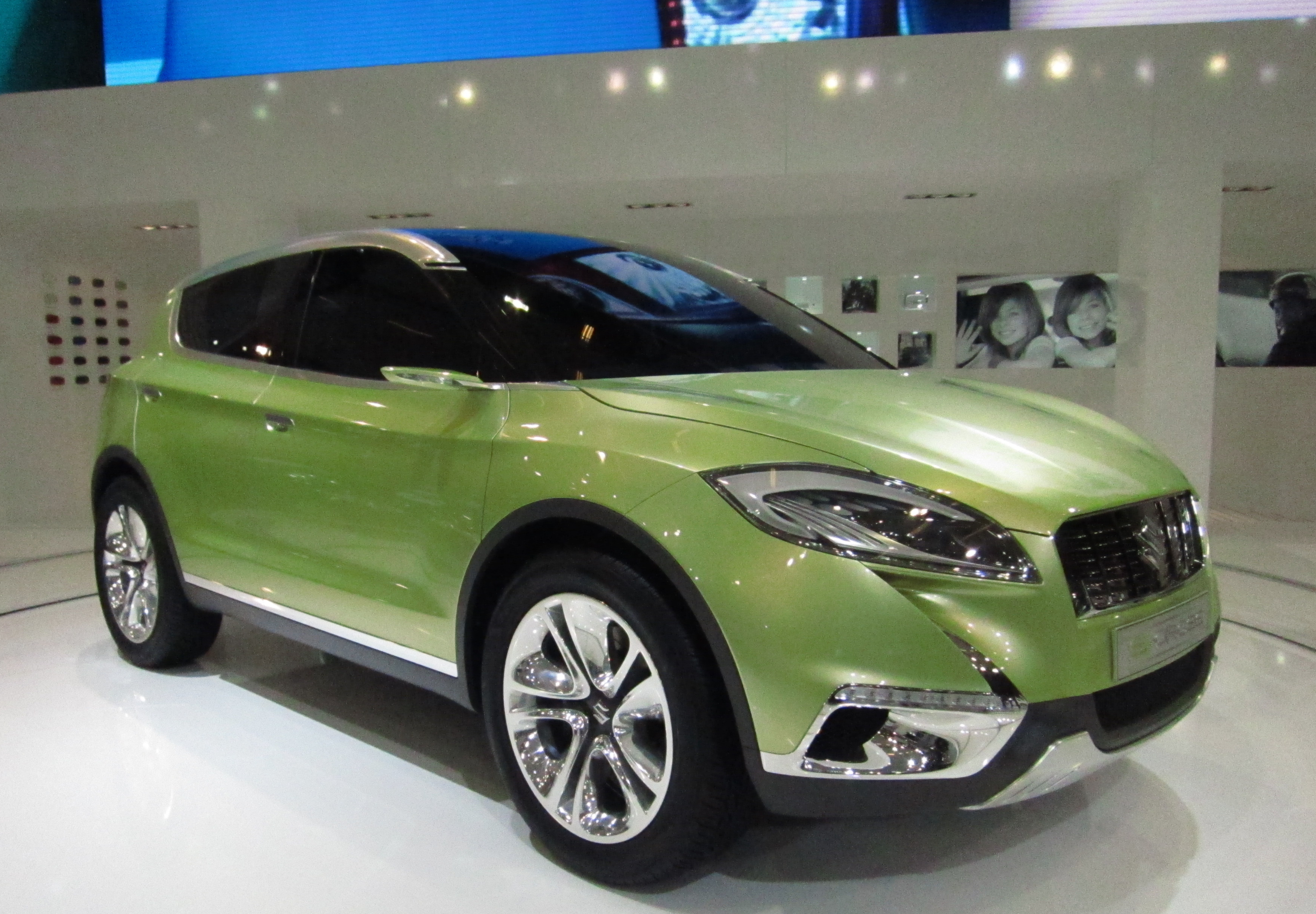

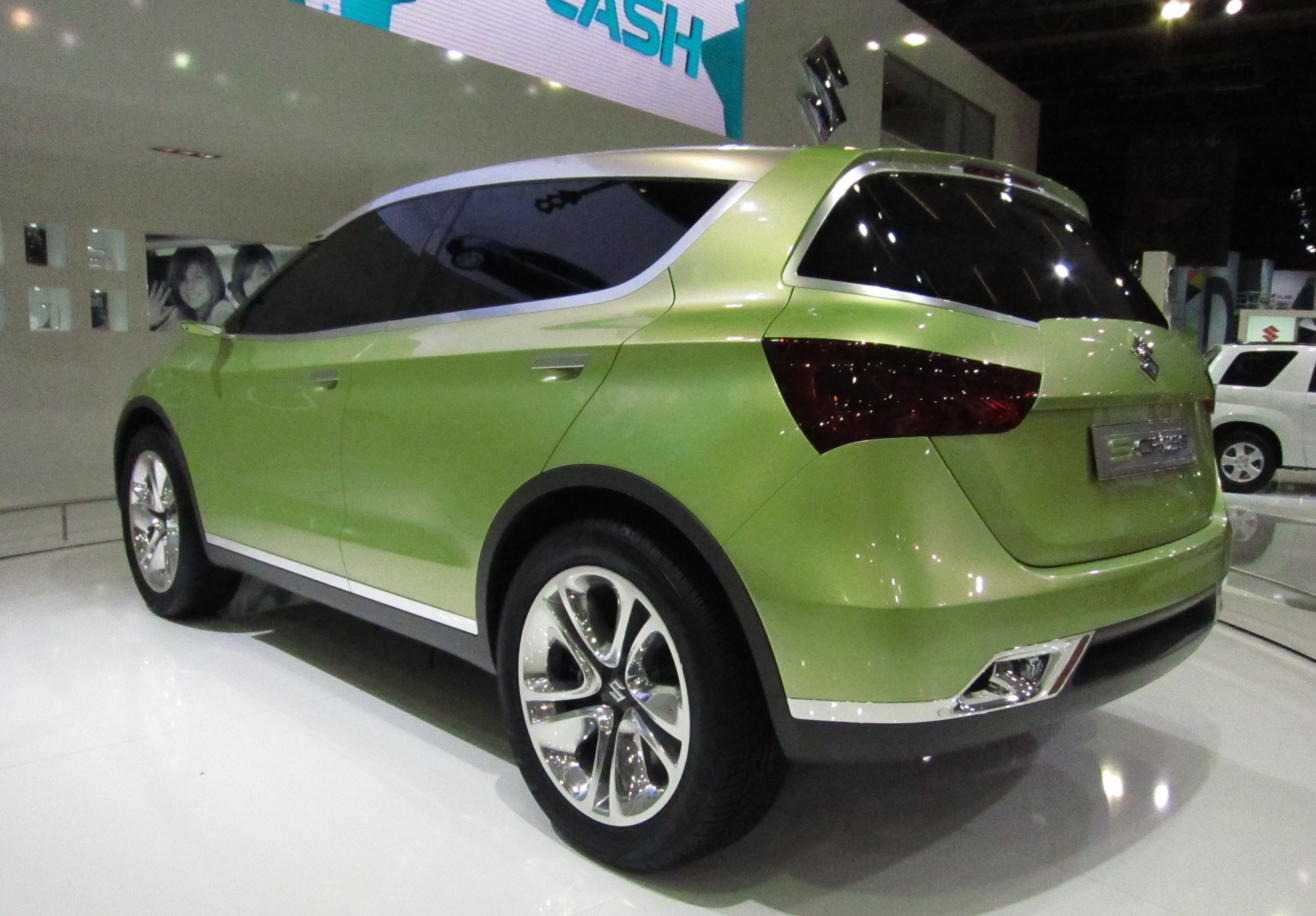
Suzuki S-Cross Concept

Suzuki unveiled the S-Cross Concept at the Paris Motor Show in September 2012, a version of a subcompact crossover as an introduction for an upcoming production model. At that time, Suzuki announced that the S-Cross would be a new model, not a replacement for SX4, whose production was scheduled to continue.

A new SX4 S-Cross design, loosely based on the S-Cross concept, was unveiled at the 2013 Geneva Motor Show. Compared to its predecessor it grew in all directions, being 4,300 mm (169.3 in) long, 1,765 mm (69.5 in) wide, and 1,575–1,580 mm (62.0–62.2 in) tall. The wheelbase measures 2,600 mm (102.4 in), or 100 mm (3.9 in) more than the earlier model. These dimensions provided additional interior and boot space, 430 litres (15 cu ft) compared with 270 litres (9.5 cu ft) liters. The SX4 S-Cross is built at the Magyar Suzuki plant in Hungary. Production of the old SX4 was continued in parallel until 2014 in Japan and India.

All SX4 S-Cross models get FWD as standard with optional AWD dubbed as "AllGrip". It has four selectable driving modes and is claimed to send torque to the rear wheels before a loss in traction can occur.

The European model went on sale in the autumn of 2013. Early models include the choice of 1.6 L M16A petrol engine from the previous generation or a new Fiat Multijet 1.6 L turbo-diesel engine, mated with 5- or 6-speed manual (all engines) or CVT (petrol only) transmission. The new model is Suzuki only, and Fiat replaced the Sedici with the new 500X.

The SX4 S-Cross is not available in the United States and Canada, since Suzuki has withdrawn from these markets, but it is offered in Brazil and Mexico. It has been launched in India in September 2015, as the Maruti Suzuki S-Cross via NEXA outlets only with the 1.3 L DDiS 200 and 1.6 L DDiS 320 Fiat's turbodiesel engines, mated with 5- and 6-speed manual transmissions respectively.

In June 2015, the European market S-Cross received new hydraulically controlled clutches and gear changes for the 6-speed twin-clutch automated-manual transmission, dubbed as "Twin Clutch System by Suzuki (TCSS)". It is only available for the 1.6 L DDiS turbo-diesel engine with an all-wheel-drive "AllGrip" model.

For the Indonesian market, the SX4 S-Cross was launched at the 24th Gaikindo Indonesia International Auto Show on 11 August 2016, being fully imported from India. Unique for this market, the car is powered by a 1.5 L M15A petrol engine from the previous generation SX4 to avoid the higher tax imposed on vehicles with an engine capacity of more than 1500 cc (lifted in late 2021). The engine is mated to either a 5-speed manual or 6-speed automatic transmission. In terms of styling and features, the car is almost identical to the Indian market S-Cross.

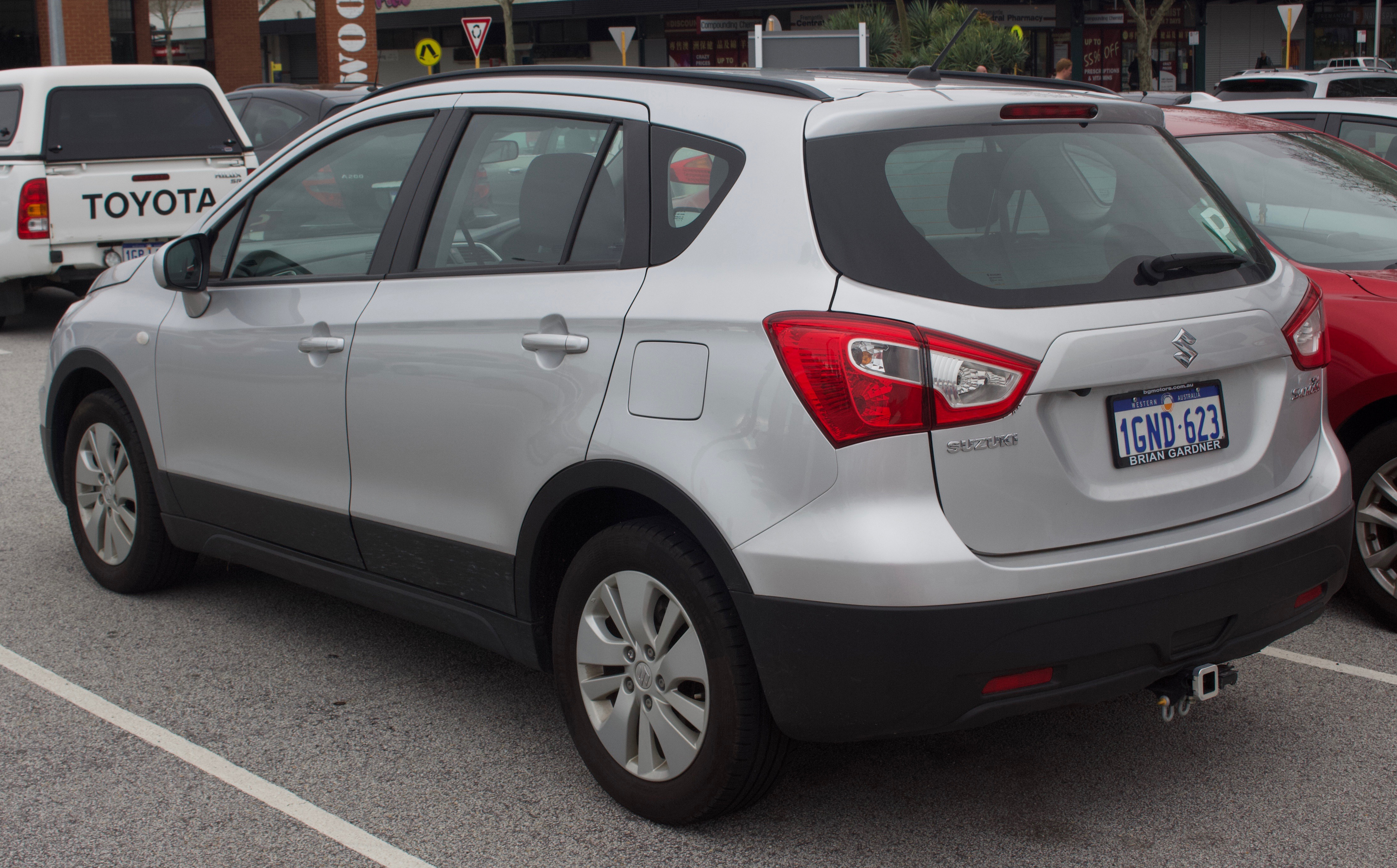
SX4 S-Cross GL (Australia; pre-facelift)

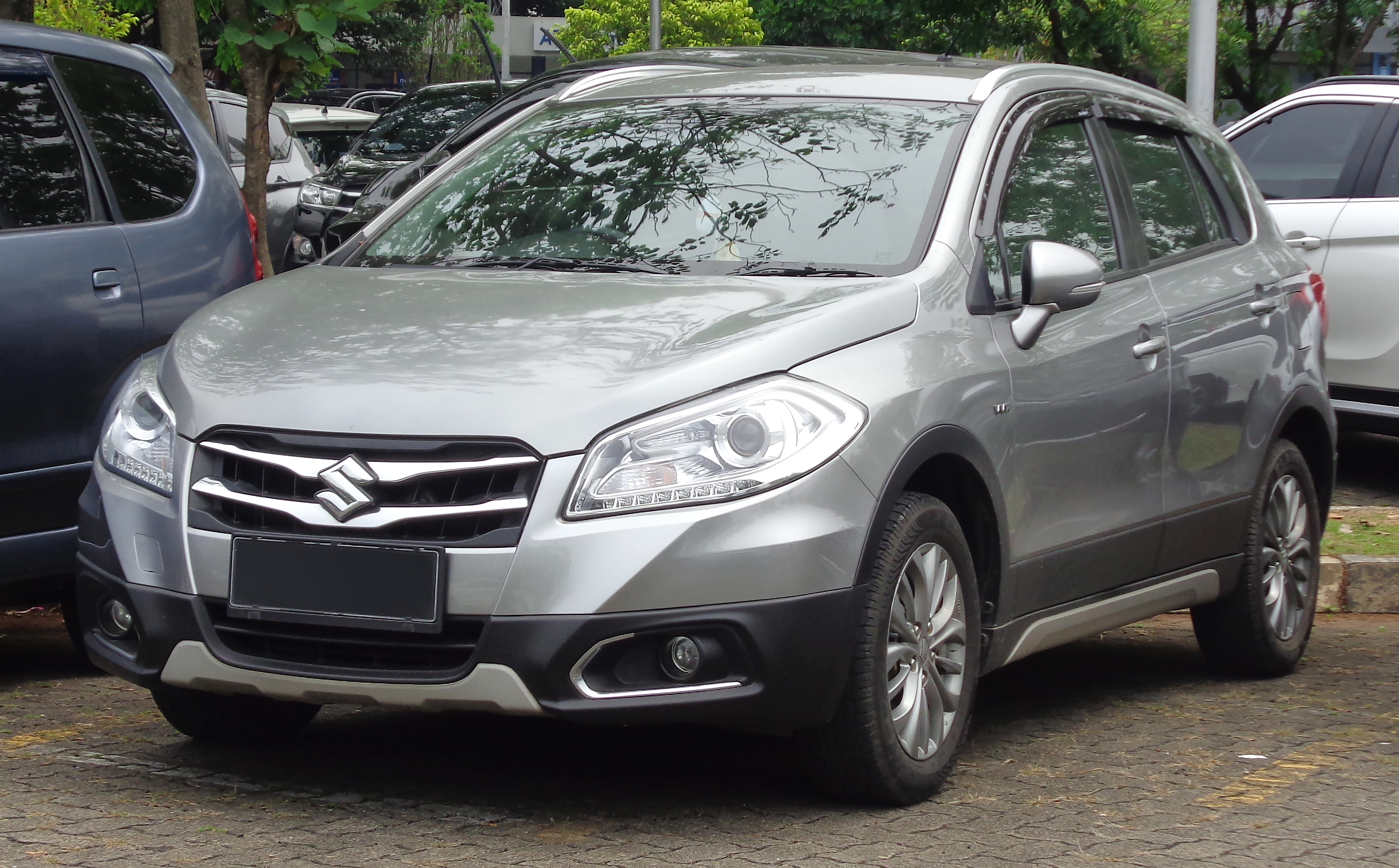
Indian and Indonesian styling (pre-facelift)

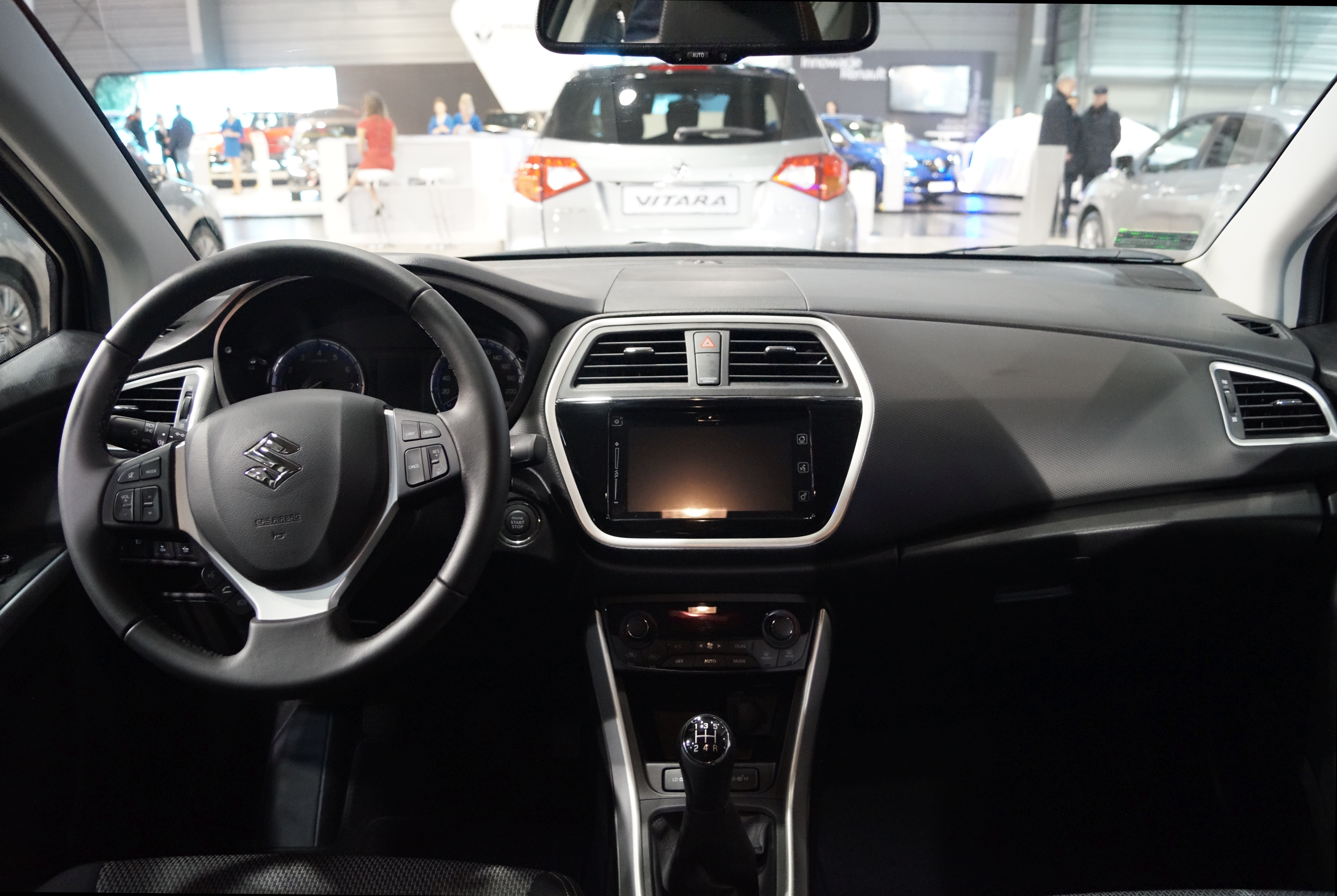
Interior

=== Facelift ===
The SX4 S-Cross design was updated in September 2016 with numerous improvements. The car received a new front-end design, tail lights, alloy wheels with 10-mm wider tires, and more efficient headlights, the position lamps now have energy-saving LEDs and function as daytime running lights. The interior design utilizes an updated soft-touch dashboard pad, framing highlights for the center panel, and newly designed seat fabric.

Brand new direct injection turbocharged "Boosterjet" engine series was also introduced. The inline-three 1.0 L K10C rated at 82 kW (111 PS) / 170 N⋅m (125 lb⋅ft) and inline-four 1.4 L K14C rated at 103 kW (140 PS) / 220 N⋅m (162 lb⋅ft). It is shared with the Vitara and Swift. The new 1.4 L turbo engine received slightly different ancillaries and ECU and complied with the Euro 6 emission standards. During development, Suzuki's engineers virtually eliminated the typical delay in turbo power delivery by installing the specially developed compact turbocharger attached directly to the cylinder head as well as incorporating the exhaust manifold into the cylinder head casting. This design ensures optimum gas flow with minimal heat loss through to the turbo unit. The turbocharger has a boost pressure of 1.1 Bar. The 1.0 L engine is mated to a 5-speed manual as standard, with a 6-speed manual for the 1.4 L engine, while the 6-speed automatic transmission is also available both engines. For most markets outside Europe, the 1.6 L petrol engine is still available instead of the new 1.0 L "Boosterjet" turbo engine for the lower model. It is only available with a 6-speed automatic transmission, replacing both 5-speed manual and CVT transmissions.

The facelifted S-Cross was launched in August 2017 in Ecuador. It was offered through Chevrolet, but still marketed with Suzuki's badges. Chevrolet stopped offering S-Cross when Suzuki re-entered the Ecuadorian market in August 2021.

Both petrol and diesel engines in Europe were discontinued in April 2020 and replaced with a turbocharged 1.4 L K14D "Boosterjet SHVS" mild hybrid engine due to the implementation of European 6d emission standard. The engine received a dual VVT system, new design fuel injectors, and a higher-pressure fuel pump. It is now rated at 95 kW (129 PS) / 235 N⋅m (173 lb⋅ft). The mild hybrid system consists of a 48V lithium-ion battery, Integrated Starter Generator (ISG), and 48V-12V (DC/DC) converter to power components requiring lower voltage including lights, audio, and air conditioning. The ISG acts as both a generator and starter motor, is belt driven, and assists the petrol engine during vehicle take off. This system adds 10 kW (13.6 PS) / 53 N⋅m (39 lb⋅ft).

The facelifted version of the SX4 S-Cross was launched in India on 28 September 2017. The 1.6 L DDiS 320 turbo-diesel engine was not available for the facelifted model and only available in a mild hybrid setup, with a 48V belted alternator-starter unit coupled to the 1.3 L DDiS 200 turbo-diesel engine and a 5-speed manual transmission. Due to BS6 norms being implemented since 1 April 2020, the diesel was discontinued. A petrol model was introduced in August 2020 with a 1.5 L K15B engine with 12V mild hybrid and an option of a 4-speed automatic transmission. In 2017, the Indian S-Cross contains over 95% local parts.

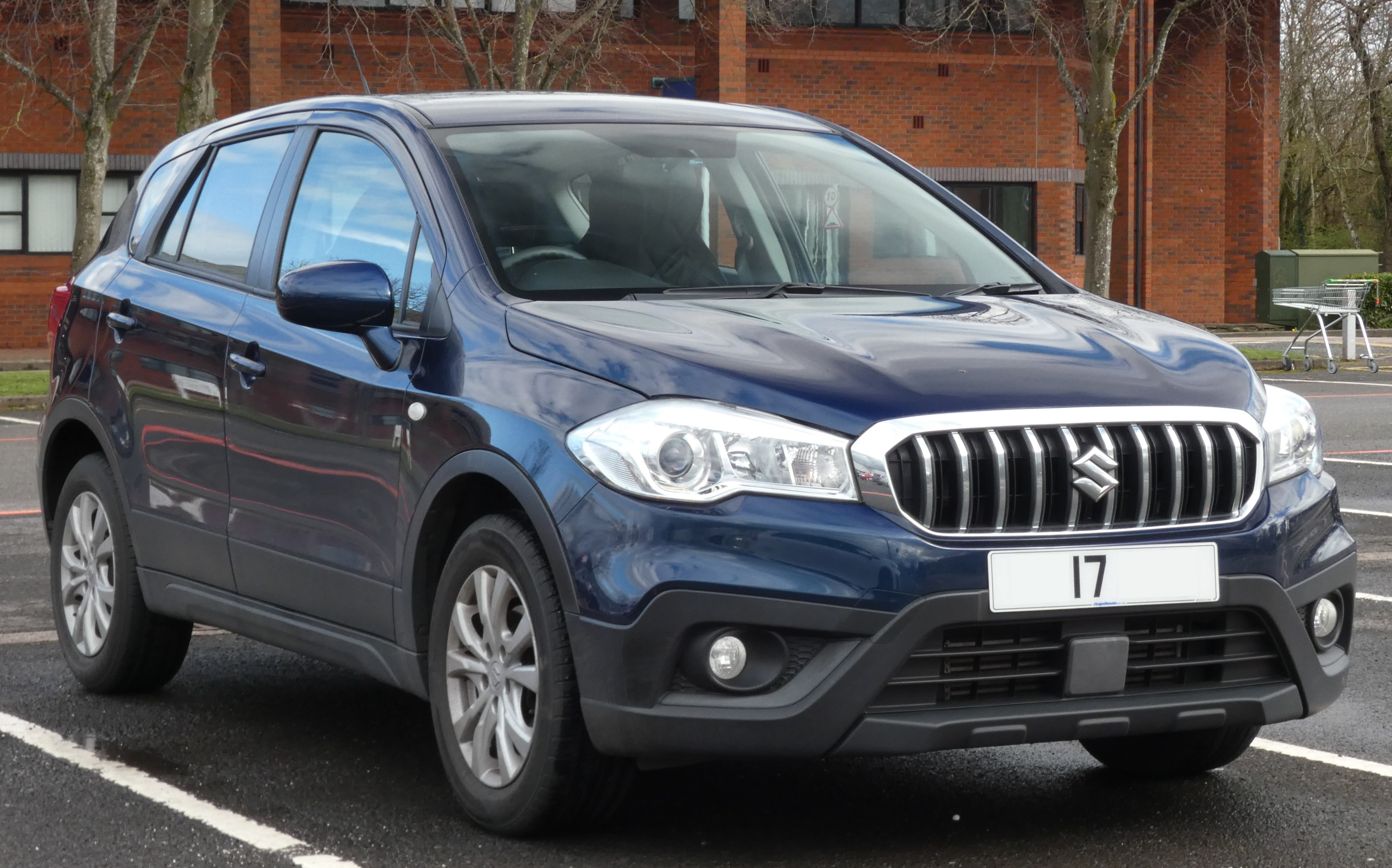
SX4 S-Cross SZ4 (UK; facelift)

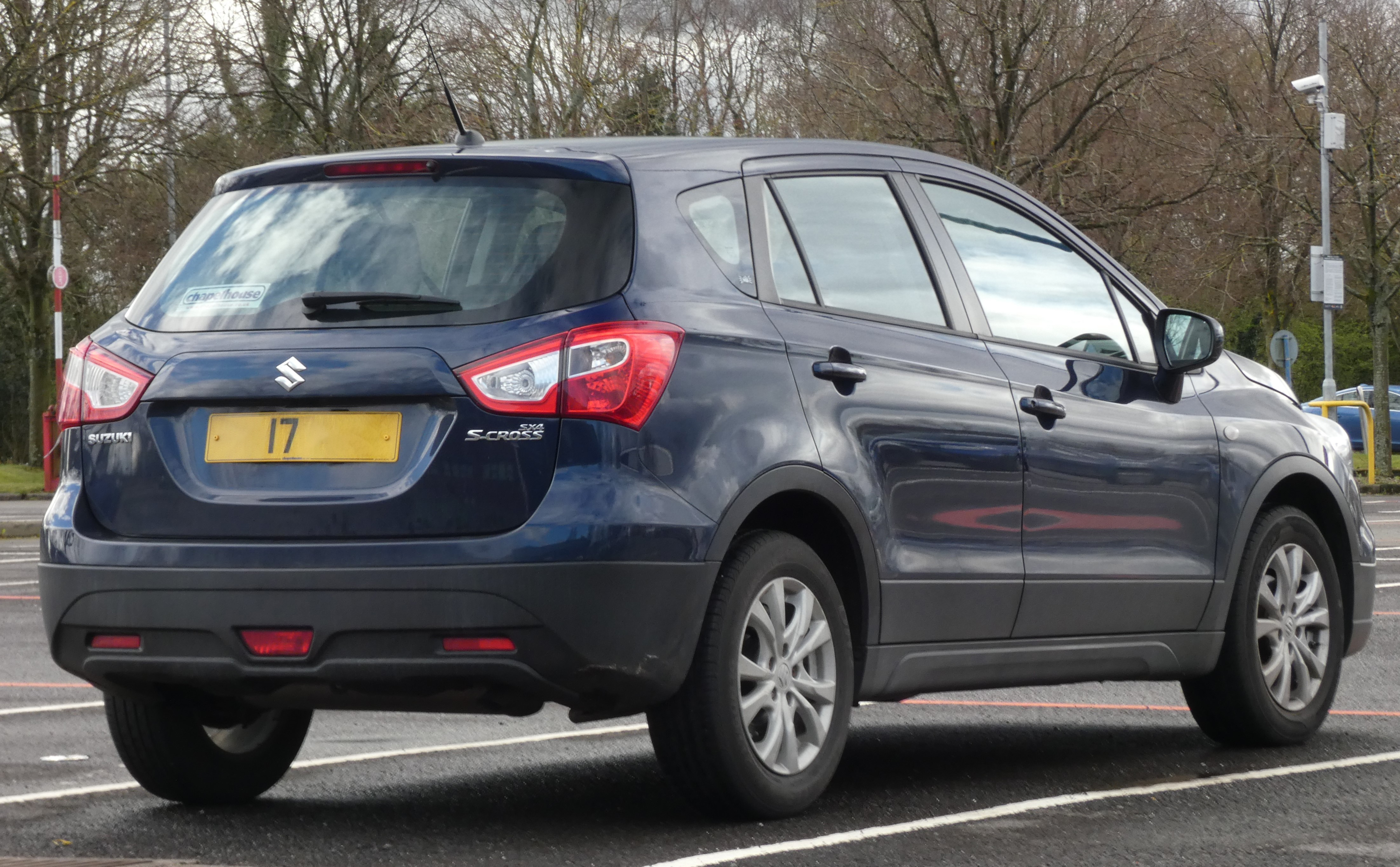
SX4 S-Cross SZ4 (UK; facelift)

=== Safety ===
The SX4 S-Cross achieved a maximum five-star Euro NCAP safety rating when it was first released in 2013. The same result was also issued by ANCAP in 2013 and ASEAN NCAP in 2015.

ANCAP test results* Suzuki SX4 S-Cross all front-wheel-drive variants (2013)
Test	Score
Overall	5 /5 stars
Frontal offset	14.30/16
Side impact	16/16
Pole	2/2
Seat belt reminders	3/3
Whiplash protection	Good
Pedestrian protection	Adequate
Electronic stability control	Standard

ASEAN NCAP test results Suzuki S-Cross (2015)
Test	Points	Stars
Adult occupant:	15.48	5 /5 stars
Child occupant:	81%	4 /5 stars
Safety assist:	NA	

== Third generation (JYB; 2021) ==
Third generation
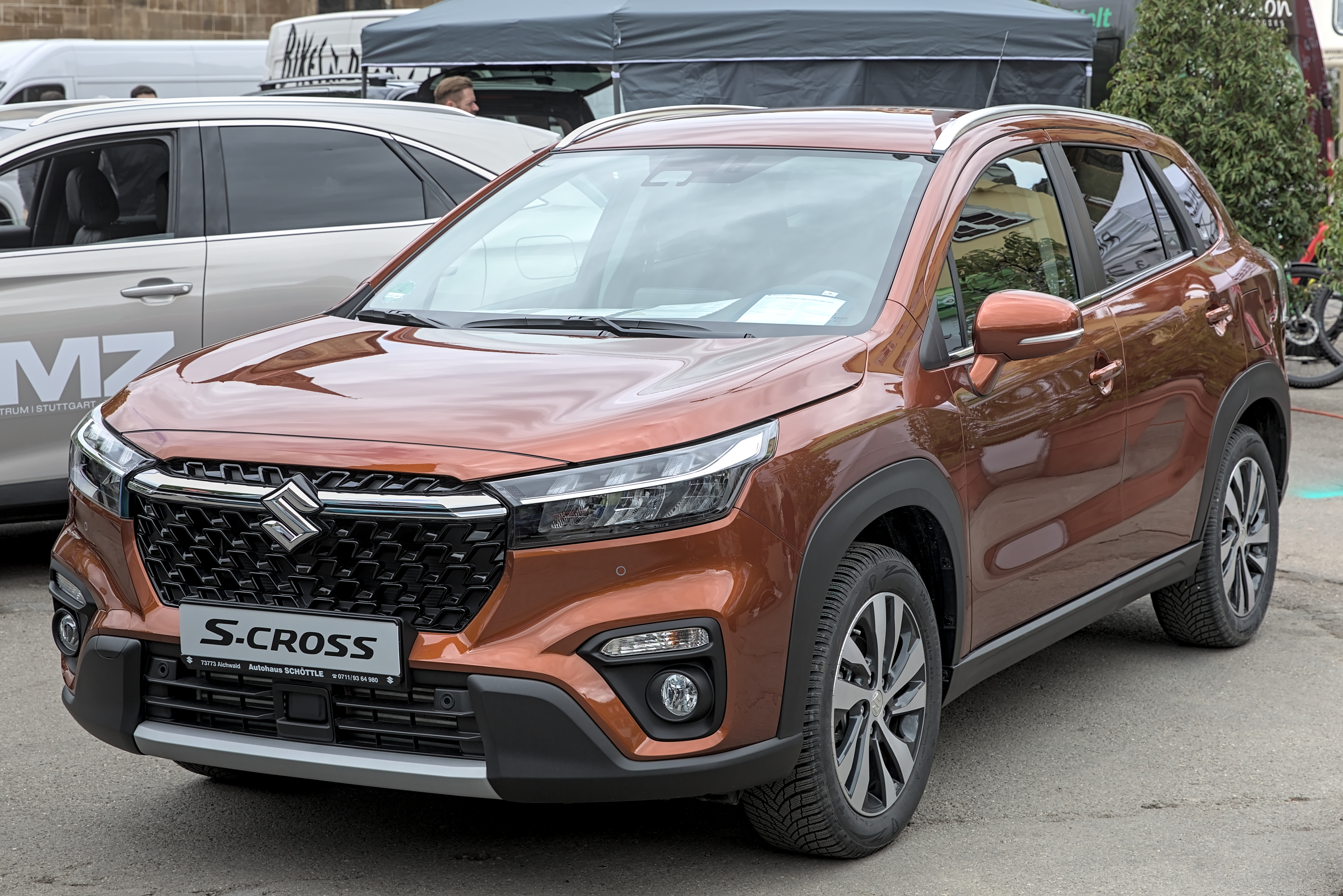

Overview
- Model code: JYB
- Also called: Suzuki S-Cross
- Production: 2021–present
- Assembly: Hungary: Esztergom (Magyar Suzuki)
- Designer: Cristiano Zanot and Yūta Horiuchi

Body and chassis
- Body style: 5-door SUV
- Layout: Front-engine, front-wheel-drive or four-wheel-drive "AllGrip"
- Platform: Suzuki Global C platform
- Related: Suzuki Grand Vitara (2022); Suzuki Victoris; Suzuki Vitara (LY); Suzuki Vitara Brezza/Brezza

Powertrain
- Engine: Petrol: 1.4 L K14C Boosterjet turbo I4; Petrol Hybrid: 1.4 L K14D Boosterjet turbo I4 MHEV; 1.5 L K15C Dualjet I4 HEV
- Electric motor: HEV: PB03A AC synchronous Motor Generator Unit (MGU); MHEV: WA06B DC synchronous Integrated Starter Generator (ISG)
- Transmission: 6-speed manual; 6-speed automatic; 6-speed AMT
- Hybrid drivetrain: 48V SHVS mild hybrid; 140V full hybrid
- Battery: Lithium-ion

Dimensions
- Wheelbase: 2,600 mm (102.4 in)
- Length: 4,300 mm (169.3 in)
- Width: 1,785 mm (70.3 in)
- Height: 1,585 mm (62.4 in)
- Curb weight: 1,235–1,330 kg (2,723–2,932 lb)

Chronology
- Successor: Suzuki Across (Mexico)

Suzuki unveiled the third-generation SX4 S-Cross online on 25 November 2021. It is continued to be manufactured by Magyar Suzuki in Hungary for the European market and also exported to Asia, Oceania and Latin America. It was designed by Suzuki Italia Design Center in Turin.

The car is heavily based on the previous generation model, with a major makeover on the exterior with a new front and rear-end design. In the interior, it received an updated dashboard design, a gauge cluster with a 4.2-inch LCD multi-info display from Vitara, and either a 7- or 9-inch floating design touchscreen infotainment system. The driver assistance system is also upgraded with additional 360 degrees view camera, blind spot monitoring, and rear cross-traffic alert. The exterior dimensions and interior space remain exactly the same as the previous generation.

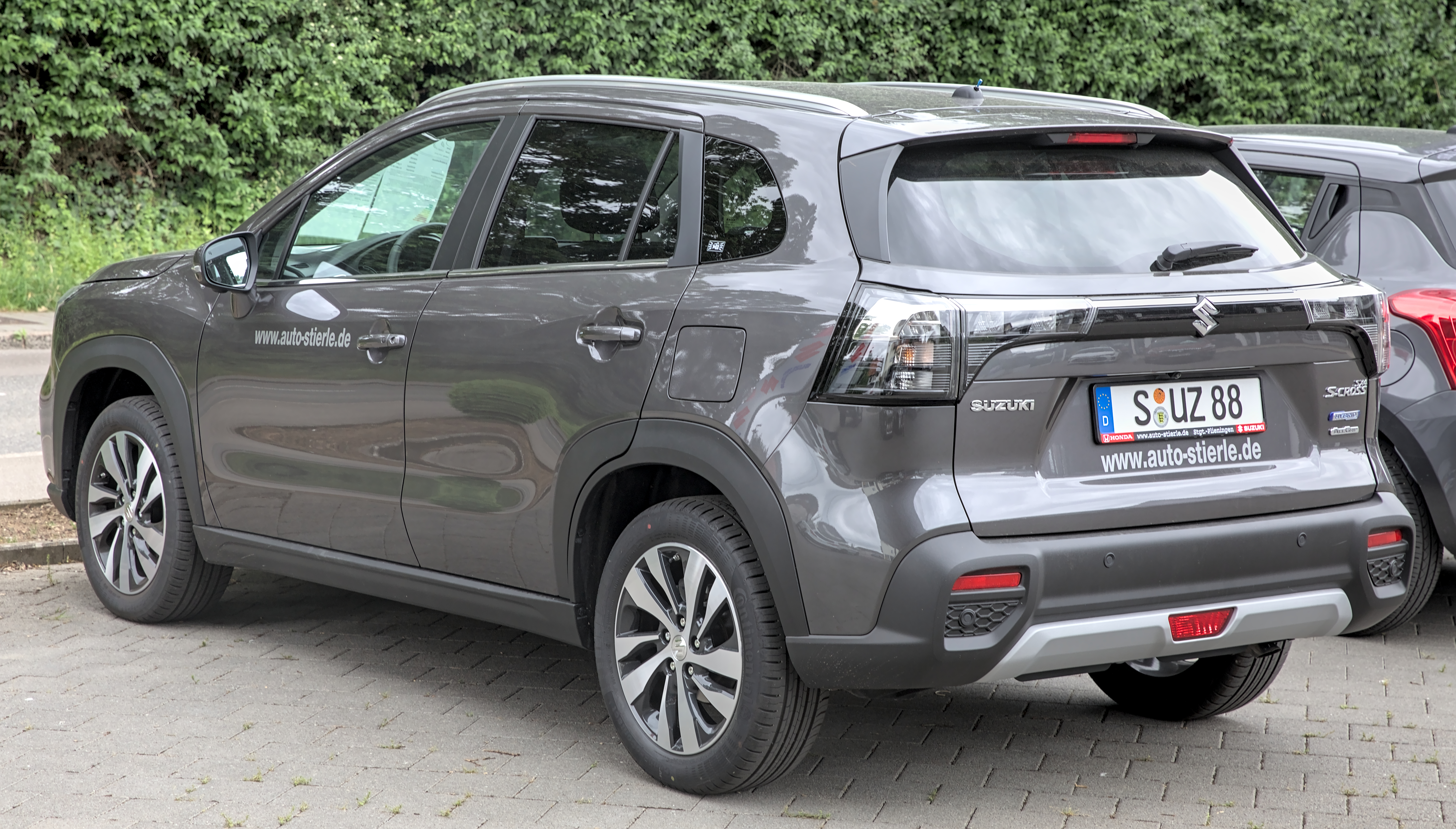
Rear view

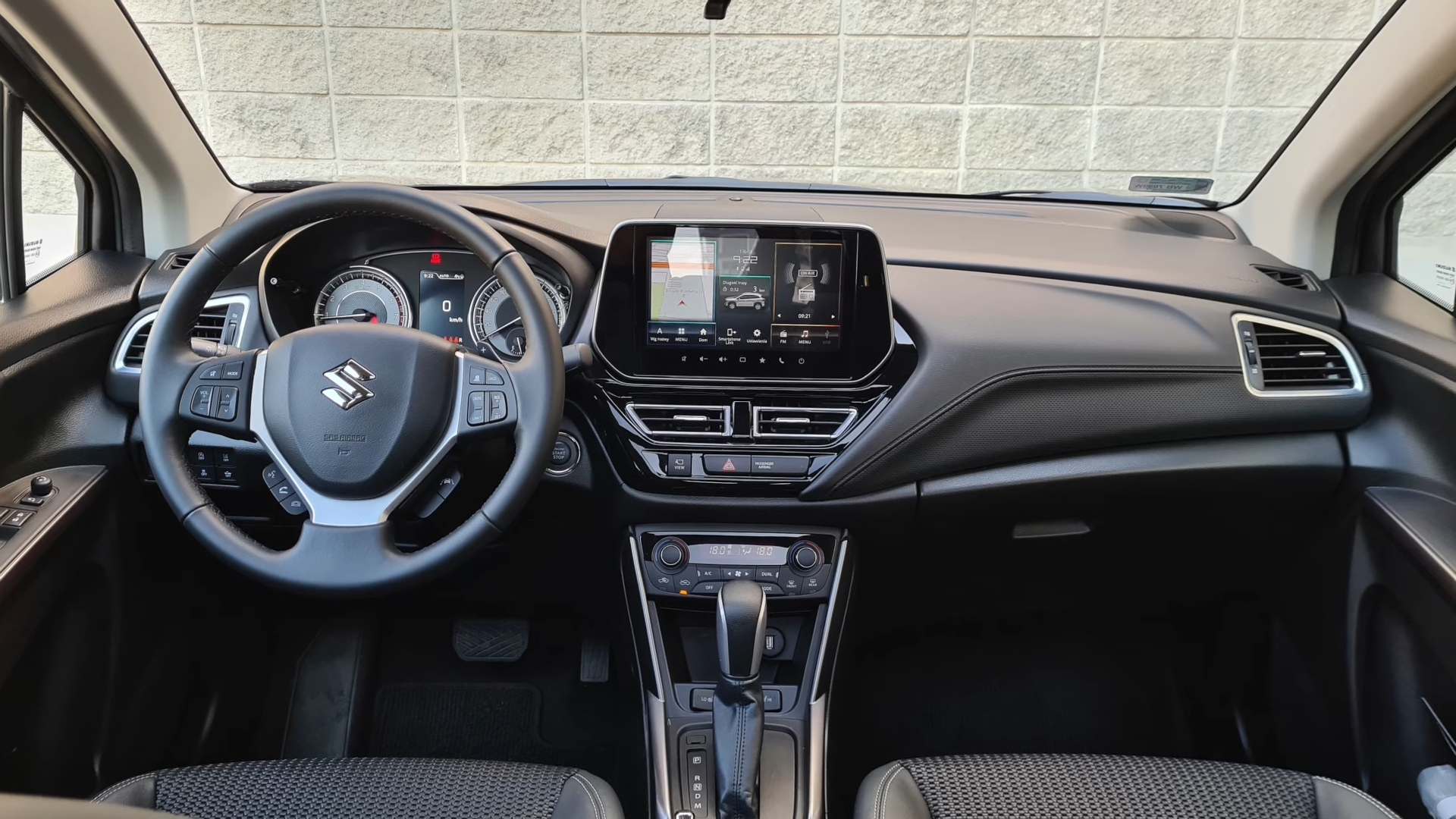
Interior

=== Powertrain ===
The turbocharged 1.4 L direct injection engine with belt-driven 48V Integrated Starter Generator (ISG) mild hybrid system is also carried over from the previous model for the European market. The engine rated at 129 PS (127 hp; 95 kW) and 235 N⋅m (173 lb⋅ft; 24 kg⋅m) of torque, the electric motor produces 13.6 PS (13 hp; 10 kW) and 53 N⋅m (39 lb⋅ft; 5 kg⋅m) of torque. It is paired with either a 6-speed manual or automatic transmission and is available for both front-wheel or all-wheel-drive configurations. Strong hybrid version with Motor Generator Unit (MGU) and automated manual transmission "Auto Gear Shift (AGS)" that was seen in 2022 Vitara/Escudo Hybrid is expected to come in summer 2022. The old conventional 1.4 L turbocharged engine from the previous generation is retained for markets outside Europe.

The combined fuel consumption for the 1.4 L turbo mild hybrid engine is claimed more economical than its predecessor and competitors. The car achieved fuel economy rating between 5.3–6.1 L/100 km (53–46 mpg_{‑imp}; 44–39 mpg_{‑US}; 19–16 km/L) depending on drive layout and transmission option, according to WLTP test.

Engine/Motor	Cylinder	Displacement	Transmission	Power	Torque
K14C Boosterjet	I4	1372 cc	6-speed manual 6-speed automatic	140 PS (103 kW; 138 hp) at 5500 rpm	230 N⋅m (170 lb⋅ft; 23 kg⋅m) at 2500–3500 rpm
K14D Boosterjet + WA06B	I4	1372 cc	6-speed manual 6-speed automatic	129 PS (95 kW; 127 hp) at 5500 rpm + 13.6 PS (10 kW; 13 hp) at 3000 rpm	235 N⋅m (173 lb⋅ft; 24 kg⋅m) at 2000–3000 rpm + 53 N⋅m (39 lb⋅ft; 5 kg⋅m) at 500 rpm
K15C Dualjet + PB03A	I4	1462 cc	6-speed AMT	103 PS (76 kW; 102 hp) at 6000 rpm + 33.4 PS (25 kW; 33 hp) at 5500 rpm 115 PS (85 kW; 113 hp) at 6000 rpm (combined)	138 N⋅m (102 lb⋅ft; 14 kg⋅m) at 4400 rpm + 60 N⋅m (44 lb⋅ft; 6 kg⋅m) at 100–2000 rpm

== Sales ==
=== SX4 ===
Year	Europe	India	China	United States
2005	3			
2006	22,240		711	
2007	48,757		21,379	
2008	51,985		38,886	29,563
2009	41,209		50,409	20,713
2010	36,931		65,651	11,606
2011	35,554	21,830	66,964	12,519
2012	29,505	10,069	42,070	12,861
2013	28,106	5,329	33,244	2,740
2014	14,126	1,632	21,115	
2015	3,161		14,915	
2016	489		8,577	
2017	393		1,444	
2018	10		75	
2019	14			
2020	3			

=== SX4 S-Cross ===
Year	Europe	India	China	Indonesia
2013	8,985		1,627	
2014	39,070		42,926	
2015	29,087	16,954	30,812	
2016	23,185	22,137	11,851	1,769
2017	31,764	26,604	14,864	3,325
2018	31,577	41,528	5,436	2,689
2019	36,154	18,179	1,470	1,045
2020	20,776	12,222	210	590
2021	25,261	20,383		247
2022	22,897			
