= Indian Car of the Year =

- Country: India
- First award: 2006; 20 years ago
- Website: www.icoty.org

The Indian Car of the Year Award (ICOTY) is presented annually to the best new car launched in India, and is based on similar other awards such as European Car of the Year. The award was established in 2006, with the Maruti Suzuki Swift winning the first award and the Mahindra Thar Roxx winning the latest award in 2025.

Hyundai has won the award eight times, while Maruti Suzuki five times and Honda and Mahindra & Mahindra have won twice. Swift is the only car model to win the award three times. Most of the award-winning cars have been from Japanese or Korean manufacturers, and are available globally in the same or different guises. The Hyundai Elite i20 and i10 Grand, for instance, are available in Europe and Japan. The European Renault Duster developed by the Renault engineers, sold worldwide and built in India yet got this award for 2013. The Maruti brand on Suzuki models is exclusive to India. The Honda City is largely restricted to Asian and South American markets, while the Ford Figo is a modified version of the Ford Fiesta that was sold in Europe from 2002 to 2008. The Honda Civic is a global model, although not all versions are sold on every market.

ICOTY also awards the Premium Car Award, first awarded in 2019 for luxury and performance cars and the Green Car Award, first awarded for hybrid and electric cars in 2021.

== Rules ==
All new car models except facelift qualify for the award, however cars which have minor changes such as cosmetic face lifts or minor mechanical changes do not qualify for the award. The car has to be manufactured or assembled in India and has to be on sale before 30 November of the previous year. The car should be approved for the Indian market by the official authority however CBU's (Completely Built Unit) which are imported are not considered for the award.

For the Premium Car Award, luxury and performance cars priced above the ₹40 lakh are considered including cars which come through the CBU route. Green Car Award takes in consideration hybrid and electric cars and also include cars which come through the CBU route.

=== Voting process ===
The voting jury consists automobile journalists from all over India. Each jury member has a maximum of 25 points, where each member can allot a maximum of 10 points to one car. And every Jury member must give points to at least 5 of the contending cars.

== Exam Results ==
=== Indian Car of the Year ===
==== Winners by the Year ====
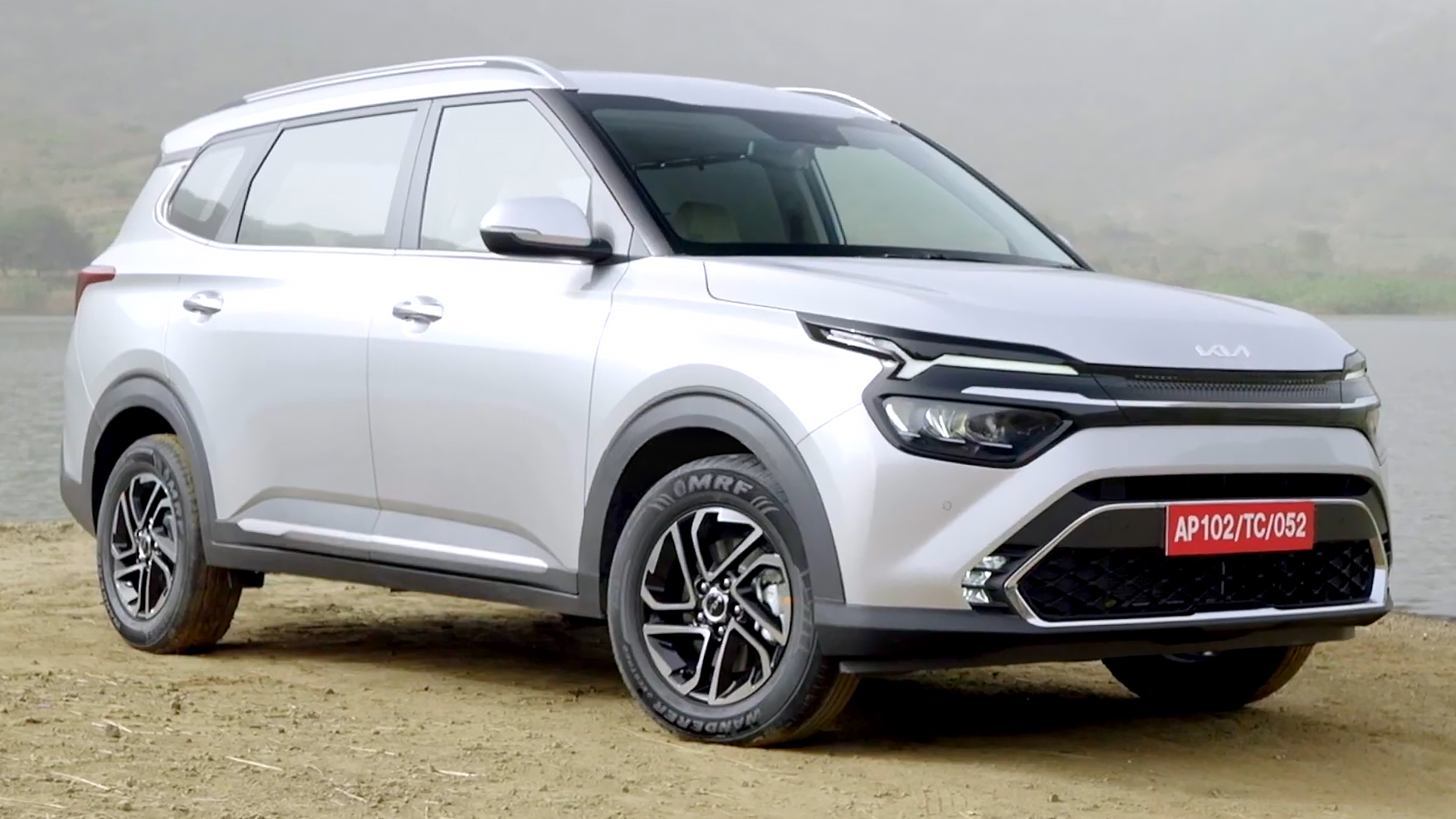
Kia Carens, the 2023 winner of Indian Car of the Year.

Year	Winner
2006	Maruti Suzuki Swift
2007	Honda Civic
2008	Hyundai i10
2009	Honda City
2010	Tata Nano
2011	Ford Figo
2012	Maruti Suzuki Swift
2013	Renault Duster
2014	Hyundai Grand i10
2015	Hyundai Elite i20
2016	Hyundai Creta
2017	Maruti Suzuki Vitara Brezza
2018	Hyundai Verna
2019	Maruti Suzuki Swift
2020	Hyundai Venue
2021	Hyundai i20
2022	Mahindra XUV700
2023	Kia Carens
2024	Hyundai Exter
2025	Mahindra Thar Roxx
2026	Maruti Suzuki Victoris

==== Winners by manufacturers ====
Brand	Award nb.	Models							
(South Korea) Hyundai	8	i10 (2008)	Grand i10 (2014)	Elite i20 (2015)	Creta (2016)	Verna (2018)	Venue (2020)	i20 (2021)	Exter (2024)
(India) (Japan) Maruti Suzuki	5	Swift (2006)	Swift (2012)	Vitara Brezza (2017)	Swift (2019)	Victoris (2026)			
(Japan) Honda	2	Civic (2007)	City (2009)						
(India) Mahindra	2	XUV700 (2022)	Thar Roxx (2025)						
(United States) Ford	1	Figo (2011)							
(France) Renault	1	Duster (2013)							
(India) Tata	1	Nano (2010)							
(South Korea) Kia	1	Carens (2023)							

=== Premium Car Award ===
==== Winners by Year ====
Year	Winner
2019	Volvo XC40
2020	BMW 3 Series
2021	Land Rover Defender
2022	Mercedes-Benz S-Class
2023	Mercedes-Benz EQS 580
2024	BMW 7 Series
2025	Mercedes-Benz E-Class
2026	Volkswagen Golf

==== Winners by manufacturers ====
Brand	Award no.	Models		
(Germany) Mercedes-Benz	3	S-Class (2022)	EQS 580 (2023)	E-Class (2025)
(Germany) BMW	2	3 Series (2020)	BMW 7 Series (2024)	
(Germany) Volkswagen	1	Golf (2026)		
(United Kingdom) Land Rover	1	Defender (2021)		
(Sweden) Volvo	1	XC40 (2019)		

=== Green Car Award ===
==== Winners by Year ====
Year	Winner
2021	Tata Nexon EV
2022	Audi e-tron
2023	Kia EV6
2024	Hyundai Ioniq 5
2025	MG Windsor EV

==== Winners by manufacturers ====
Brand	Award nb.	Models
(India) Tata	1	Nexon EV (2021)
(Germany) Audi	1	e-tron (2022)
(South Korea) Kia	1	EV6 (2023)
(South Korea) Hyundai	1	Ioniq 5 (2024)
(United Kingdom) (China) MG	1	Windsor EV (2025)

== See also ==
- Car of the Year
- List of motor vehicle awards
