= Toyota Kirloskar Motor =

Subsidiary of Toyota Motor Corporation

Toyota Kirloskar Motor Pvt Ltd
- Type: Joint venture
- Industry: Automotive
- Founded: 6 October 1997; 29 years ago
- Headquarters: Bidadi, Bengaluru, Karnataka, India
- Key people: Masakazu Yoshimura (Managing Director)
- Products: Automobiles
- Production output: ▲337,148 units (2025)
- Revenue: ▲₹71,038 crore (US$7.6 billion) (FY2026)
- Operating income: ▲₹6,494 crore (US$690 million) (2025)
- Net income: ▼₹5,225 crore (US$560 million) (FY2026)
- Owner: Toyota Motor Corporation (89%); Kirloskar Group (11%)
- Number of employees: 7,000
- Website: www.toyotabharat.com

Toyota Kirloskar Motor Private Limited (TKM) is an Indian joint venture between Toyota Motor Corporation (89%) and Kirloskar Group (11%), for the manufacture and sales of Toyota cars in India. The headquarters are located in Bidadi, Karnataka, near Bengaluru.

== History ==
Toyota Motor Corporation entered India in 1997 in a joint venture with the Kirloskar Group. Toyota Motor Corporation (TMC) holds 89% of the share and the remaining 11% is owned by Kirloskar Group. It is based in Bidadi, Karnataka, near Bengaluru.

The company released its first product in the Indian automotive market with the launch of the Qualis in 2000. Occupying the multi utility vehicle (MUV) segment, sales of the model grew within a short span of 2 years to capture 20 per cent market share from established local manufacturers such as Mahindra and Tata Motors. In 2002 and 2003, Toyota introduced the Camry and Corolla respectively.

In 2005, TKM launched the Innova to replace the Qualis, which is based on a modern IMV platform. Later, new models were introduced including the IMV series Fortuner SUV in 2009 and Hilux pickup truck in 2022. To support the new products, the sales and service network was developed further from 22 outlets in 2000 to 166 in 2011, and 359 in 2019.

Under the Entry Family Car (EFC) project, TKM started producing the Etios in 2010 as the company's first entry-level model. Production of the vehicle created more than 2,000 jobs at TKM's newly-built second plant and approximately 500 jobs at Toyota Kirloskar Auto Parts Private Limited.

In 2017, Toyota introduced its luxury brand Lexus in the country.

=== Suzuki partnership ===
Toyota started considering its partnership agreement with Suzuki in the Indian market in 2016. In 2017, both companies agreed to market electric vehicles in the country. In 2018 and 2019, Toyota outlined its initial plan for the partnership with Suzuki, including receiving supply of Baleno, Vitara Brezza, Ciaz and Ertiga models from Suzuki, and supplying the Corolla to Suzuki. Plans also included production of the Suzuki-developed SUV at TKM from 2022 and the production of hybrid electric vehicles in India. In 2019, TKM released the Glanza as a rebadged Baleno, and the Urban Cruiser as a rebadged Vitara Brezza in 2020. In 2022, TKM released the Urban Cruiser Hyryder, which is developed by Suzuki, produced by TKM while incorporating the Toyota Hybrid System.

== Manufacturing facilities ==
TKMPL's current plant at Bidadi, Karnataka is spread across 850 acres and has a capacity of 110,000 vehicles per annum. TKMPL's second manufacturing plant on the outskirts of Bengaluru, Karnataka has a capacity of 210,000 vehicles per annum. Total production capacity is 320,000 vehicles per annum. On 16 March 2011, it announced that it was increasing production to 210,000 vehicles per annum due to increase in demand for its models especially the Etios and Fortuner.

== Industrial relations ==
On 16 March 2014, Toyota Kirloskar Motor temporarily suspended the production at two of its assembly plants in Bidadi, Karnataka whose production capacity was 310,000 units annually and has employee strength of 6,400. Cause for the shutdown was failure to reach an agreement with the union over the issue of wages, deliberate stoppages of the production line by certain sections of the employees and abusing & threatening of supervisors thereby disrupting the production for the past 25 days. Toyota Kirloskar Motor announced on 21 March 2014 to lift the lockout at the plants effective from 24 March 2014 with subject to an acceptance of a service condition which requires all the employees signing an undertaking on good conduct. On 22 April 2014, employees called off the strike after 36 days of standoff and resumed full operations.

== Etios motor racing ==
Toyota India started a One make racing series in India with the Etios car called the 'Etios Motor Racing Series'. They held 2 rounds of exhibition races in 2012, one at a purpose built race track in Chennai called the Sriperumbudur race track and other in the form of ROC (Race of champions) in Gurgaon. The 25 selected drivers then competed in the main championship held in the later half of 2013. The cars were prepared by Red Rooster Performance (based in Bangalore), and designed by TRD (Toyota Racing Development).

== Models ==
=== Current models ===
==== Toyota ====
===== Combustion engine vehicles =====
Model	Indian introduction	Current model		Notes
Model	Indian introduction	Introduction	Update/facelift	Notes
Hatchback
Glanza	2019	2022 (second generation)	2026	Rebadged from Suzuki Baleno; Locally produced
Sedan
Camry	2002	2024 (XV80)	—	Strong hybrid powertrain is standard Locally produced
SUV/crossover
Urban Cruiser Taisor	2024	2024 (first generation)	—	Rebadged from Suzuki Fronx; Locally produced
Urban Cruiser Hyryder	2022	2022 (first generation)	—	Rebadged from Suzuki Grand Vitara; Strong hybrid powertrain is optional Locally produced
Fortuner	2009	2016 (AN150/AN160)	2021	Locally produced
Land Cruiser	2010	2023 (J300)	—	Imported from Japan
MPV
Rumion	2023	2023 (first generation)	—	Rebadged from Suzuki Ertiga
Innova Crysta	2016	2016 (AN140)	2023	Locally produced
Innova HyCross	2023	2023 (AG10)	2026	Strong hybrid powertrain is optional Locally produced
Vellfire	2020	2023 (AH40)	—	Strong hybrid powertrain is standard Imported from Japan
Pickup truck
Hilux	2022	2026 (AN220)	—	Locally produced

===== Electric vehicles =====
Model	Indian introduction	Current model		Notes
Model	Indian introduction	Introduction	Update/facelift	Notes
SUV/crossover
Urban Cruiser Ebella	2026	2026 (first generation)	—	Rebadged from Suzuki e Vitara; Locally produced

==== Lexus ====
Model	Indian introduction	Current model		Notes
Model	Indian introduction	Introduction	Update/facelift	Notes
Sedan
ES	2015	2026 (XZ20)	—	Strong hybrid powertrain is standard Locally produced (XZ10) After 2026, BEV Available, Fully Imported from Japan
Sports car
LC	2017	2017 (First generation)	—	Strong hybrid powertrain is standard. Imported from Japan
SUV/crossover
NX	2020	2022 (AZ20)	—	Strong hybrid powertrain is optional. Second generation imported from Japan.
RX	2015	2023 (ALA10/ALH10)	—	Strong hybrid powertrain is standard. Imported from Japan
LX	2015	2021 (J310)	—	Imported from Japan
MPV
LM	2023	2023 (AW10)	—	Strong hybrid powertrain is standard. Imported from Japan

=== Discontinued models ===
==== Toyota ====
Model	Released	Discontinued	Image
Qualis	2000	2005	
Corolla Altis	2003	2020	
Land Cruiser Prado	2004	2020	
Innova	2005	2016	
Prius	2010	2020	
Etios	2010	2019	
Etios Liva	2011	2019	
Etios Cross	2014	2016	
Yaris	2018	2021	
Urban Cruiser	2020	2022	

==== Lexus ====
Model	Released	Discontinued	Image
LS	2017	2024	

== Sales and service network ==
As of April 2019, it has more than 350 dealerships in 225 cities across India.

== Sales performance ==
TKMPL sold 74,759 vehicles in India in the year 2010 registering a growth rate of 38% compared to 2009 sales.

== See also ==
- Toyota Motor Corporation
- Automobile industry in India
