= Suzuki Grand Vitara (2022) =

Subcompact crossover SUV produced by Suzuki and Toyota

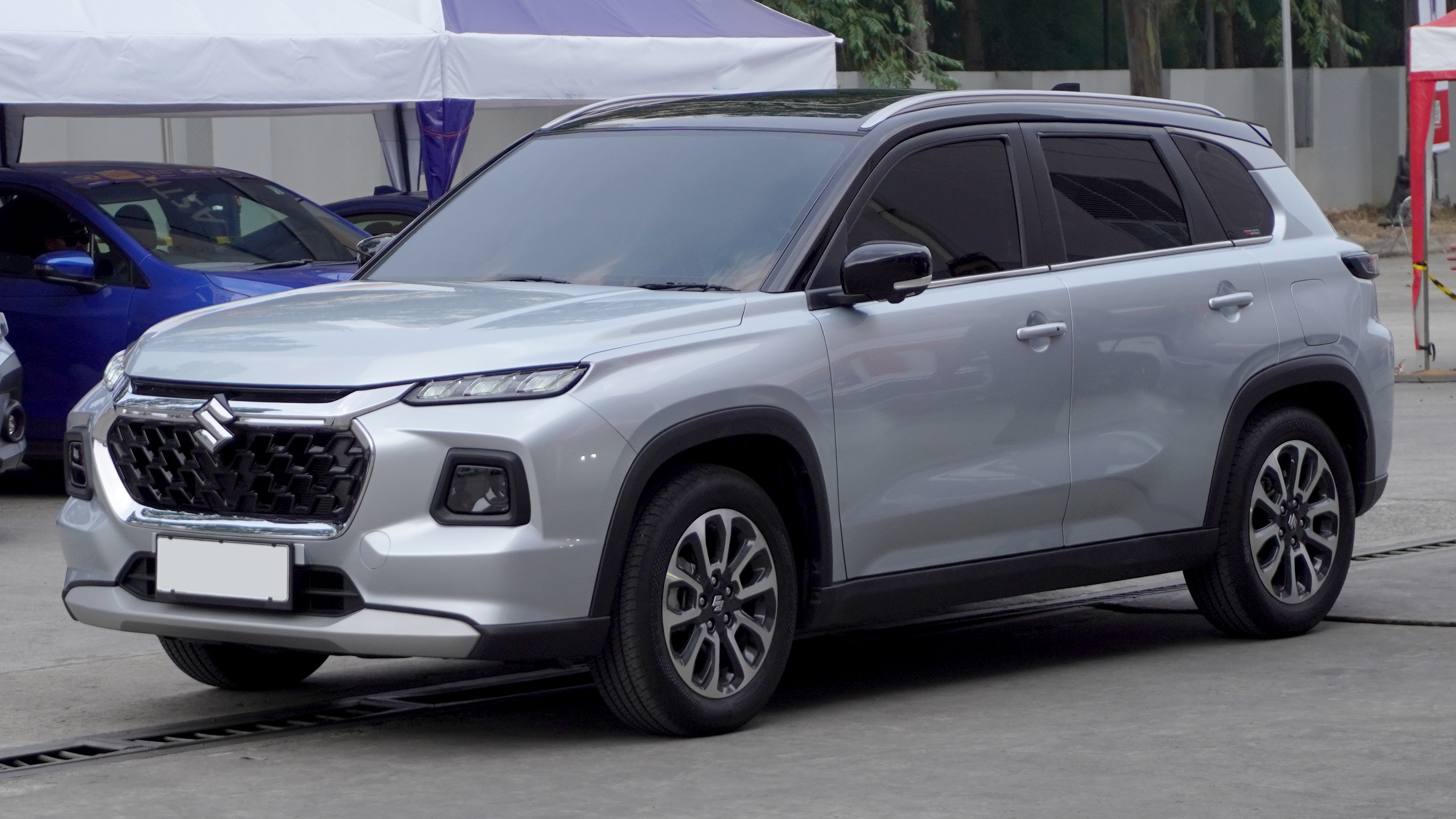
- 2023 Suzuki Grand Vitara GX Smart Hybrid

Overview
- Manufacturer: Suzuki
- Model code: YK; YM (for Urban Cruiser)
- Also called: Toyota Urban Cruiser Hyryder (India); Toyota Urban Cruiser (Africa and Middle East)
- Production: August 2022 – present
- Assembly: India: Bidadi, Karnataka (TKM)
- Designer: Yumiko Imano and Alessandro Di Gregorio

Body and chassis
- Class: Subcompact crossover SUV
- Body style: 5-door SUV
- Layout: Front-engine, front-wheel-drive; Front-engine, four-wheel-drive (mild hybrid)
- Platform: Suzuki Global C platform
- Related: Suzuki Victoris; Suzuki SX4 S-Cross; Suzuki Vitara (LY); Suzuki Brezza

Powertrain
- Engine: Petrol: 1462 cc K15B I4; 1462 cc K15C I4 mild hybrid; Petrol/CNG: 1462 cc K15C I4 (India); Petrol hybrid: 1490 cc Toyota M15D-FXE I3
- Electric motor: Integrated Starter Generator (ISG) (mild hybrid); 1NM AC synchronous (strong hybrid)
- Transmission: 5-speed manual; 4-speed automatic; 6-speed automatic (mild hybrid); e-Drive eCVT (strong hybrid)
- Hybrid drivetrain: Mild hybrid (Smart Hybrid); Power-split hybrid
- Battery: 48 V lithium-ion (mild hybrid); 0.76 kWh lithium-ion (strong hybrid)

Dimensions
- Wheelbase: 2,600 mm (102.4 in)
- Length: 4,345–4,365 mm (171.1–171.9 in)
- Width: 1,795 mm (70.7 in)
- Height: 1,635–1,645 mm (64.4–64.8 in)
- Kerb weight: 1,150–1,275 kg (2,535–2,811 lb) (mild hybrid); 1,240–1,245 kg (2,734–2,745 lb) (CNG); 1,270–1,310 kg (2,800–2,888 lb) (strong hybrid)

Chronology
- Predecessor: Suzuki S-Cross (India and Indonesia); Toyota Urban Cruiser (2020)
- Successor: Suzuki Across (Mexico)

The Suzuki Grand Vitara and Toyota Urban Cruiser Hyryder are subcompact crossover SUVs (B-segment) developed by Suzuki and produced by Toyota in India since 2022. The Urban Cruiser Hyryder was released in July 2022 in India ahead of the Grand Vitara. It is available with a range of mild and strong hybrid petrol powertrains. The Grand Vitara replaced the S-Cross in India, while the Urban Cruiser Hyryder indirectly replaced the smaller Urban Cruiser, a rebadged Vitara Brezza. In 2023, the Toyota-badged model was released as the Toyota Urban Cruiser in South Africa and the Middle East.

== Overview ==
Before the launch of Grand Vitara, the Toyota Urban Cruiser Hyryder was first released in India on 1 July 2022. The Grand Vitara's launch later followed on 20 July. The vehicle was developed by Suzuki using the Global C platform shared with the SX4 S-Cross and the Vitara.

Production of both models started in August 2022 at Toyota Kirloskar Motor's second plant in Bidadi, with sales beginning in India in September. The planned monthly production of both models is targeted at 18,000 to 19,000 units, with the Grand Vitara contributing 13,000 units. Exports to African markets started in 2023. In 2022, it was stated the 90% of the vehicle's parts were sourced in India.

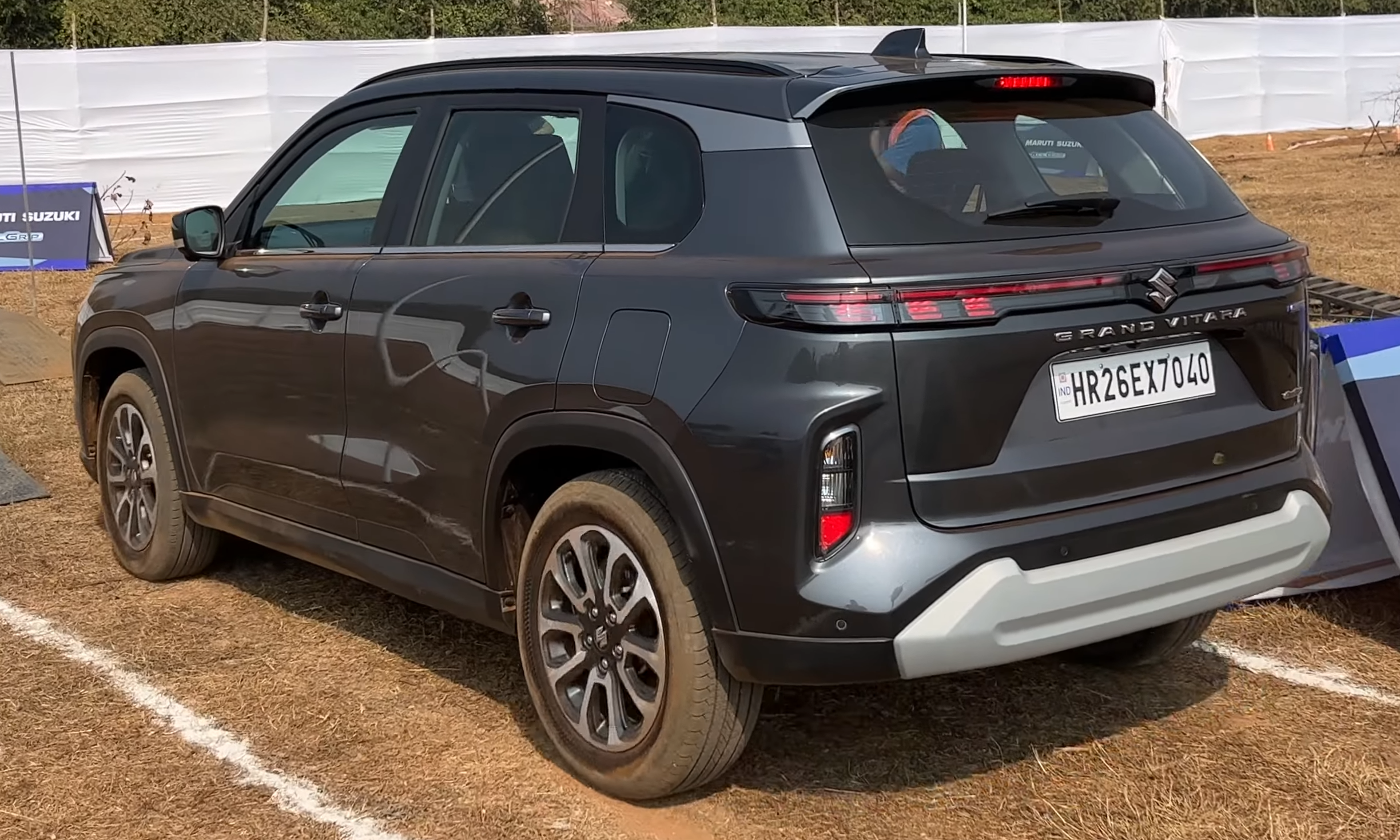
Rear view

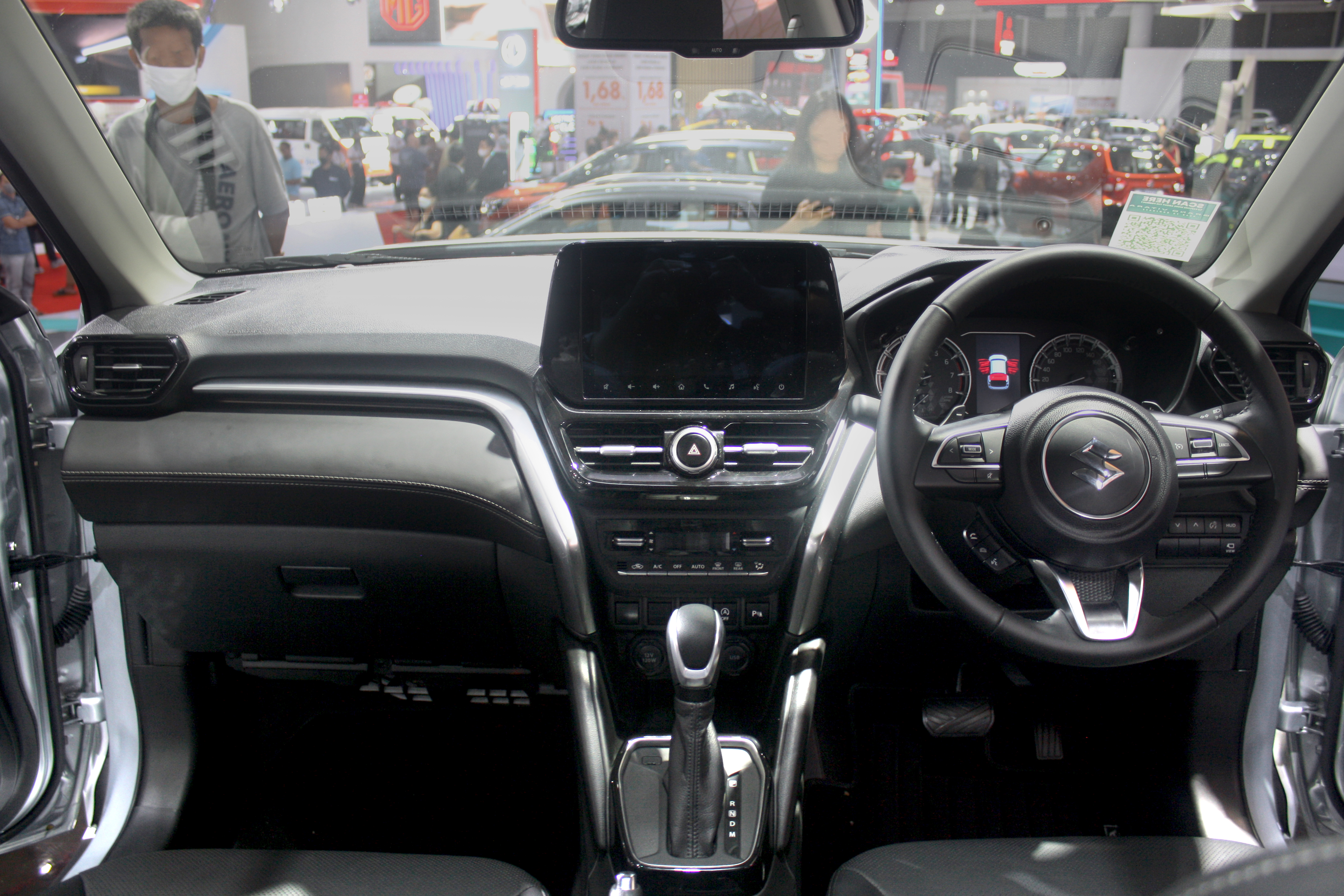
Interior

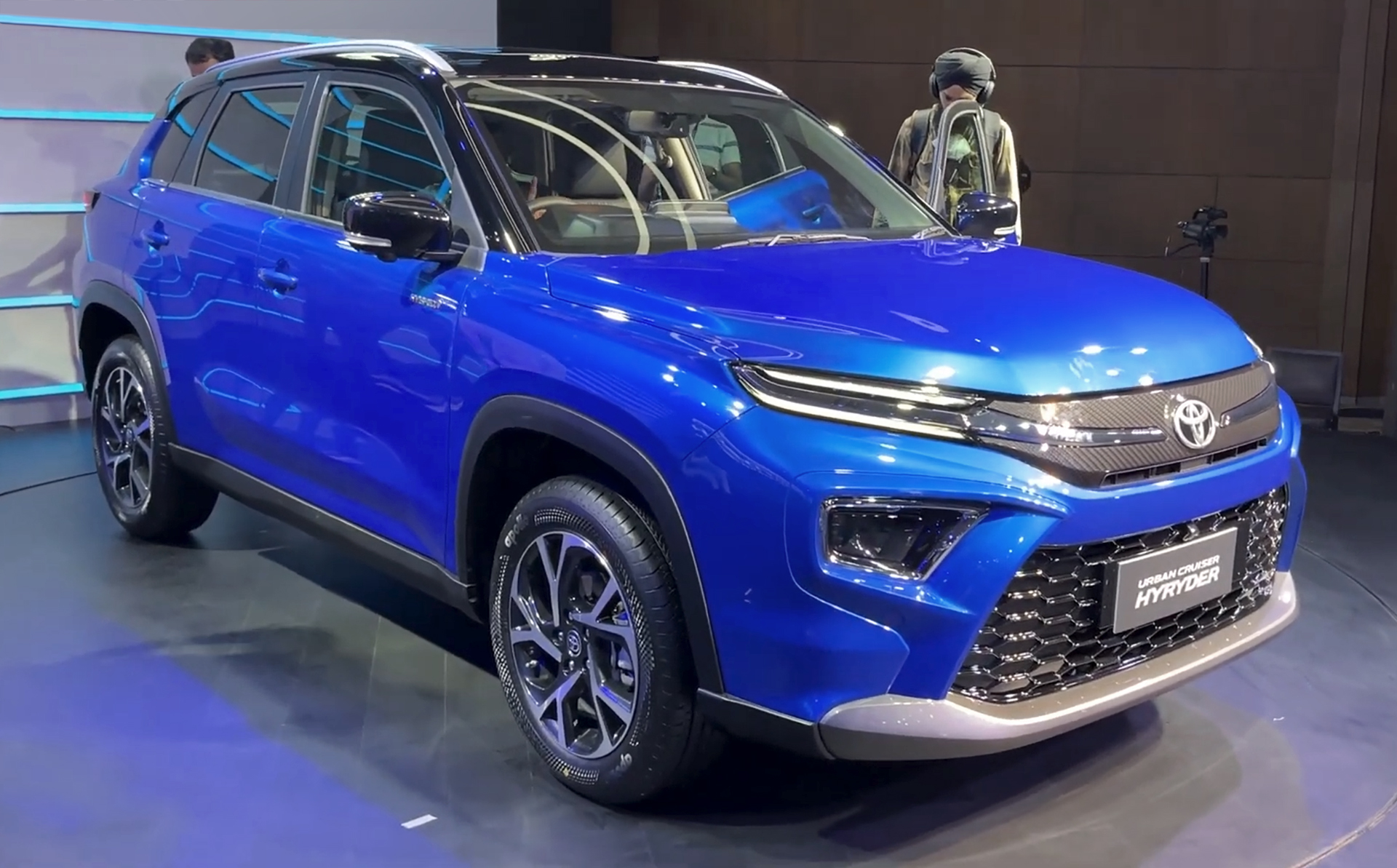
Toyota Urban Cruiser Hyryder V Hybrid (India)

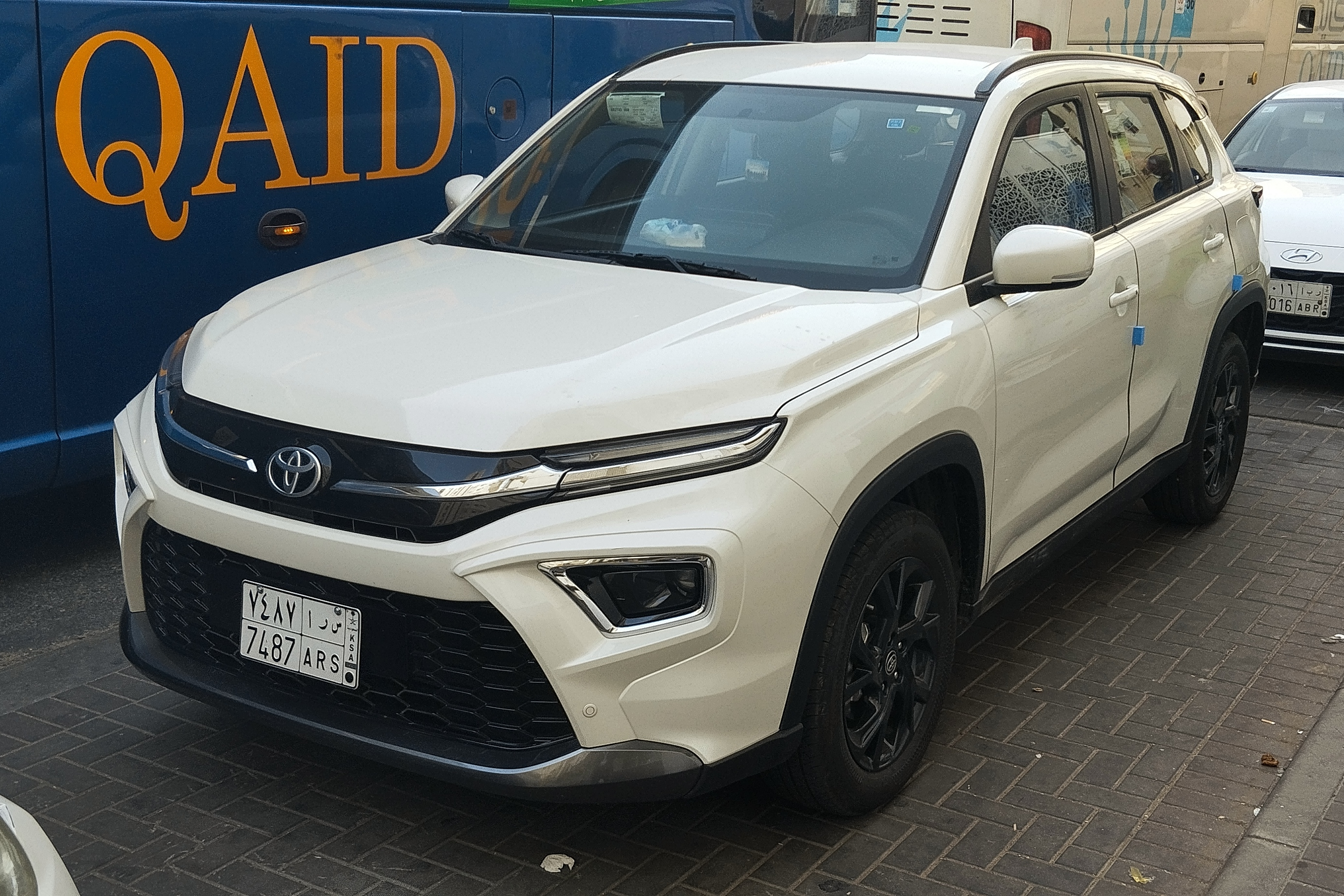
Toyota Urban Cruiser GL (Saudi Arabia)

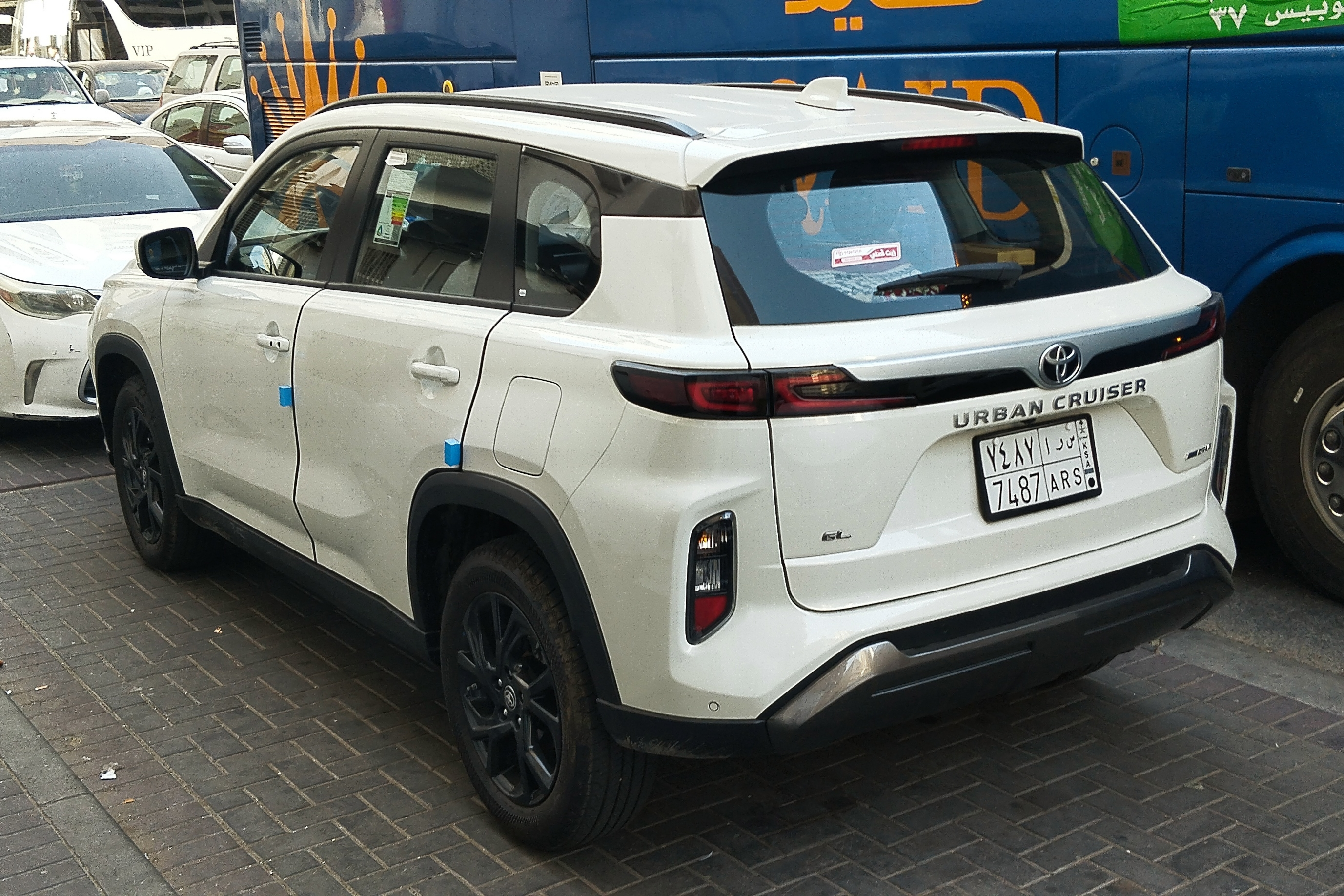
Toyota Urban Cruiser GL (Saudi Arabia)

== Markets ==
=== India ===
In India, grade levels available for the Grand Vitara are Sigma, Delta, Zeta, Zeta(O), Alpha and Alpha(O) for mild hybrid models (optional for the panoramic sunroof), and Delta+, Zeta+ and Alpha+ for strong hybrid models. An all-wheel drive model marketed as AllGrip is available for the Alpha grade with only the 6-speed automatic transmission (previously available only in manual). The model is exclusively available at the Nexa dealership chain reserved for high-end Maruti Suzuki models.

In January 2023, the CNG version of the K15C engine was introduced for the Grand Vitara. The CNG model is only available for Delta and Zeta grades with only the manual transmission option.

For the Urban Cruiser Hyryder, grade levels available in India are E, S, G, G(O) and V, with the E (base variant) only available as a mild hybrid. An all-wheel-drive model is offered for the V NeoDrive (mild hybrid) with only the 6-speed automatic gearbox (previously only with manual transmission). CNG models went on sale in January 2023 for S and G grades with only manual transmission.

The Grand Vitara hit a milestone of 200,000 sales within 22 months, while the Hyryder reached 100,000 sales by October 2024.

The car received an update in April 2025, which gave the V/Alpha mild hybrid a HUD, and a digital instrument cluster in the G/Zeta and V/Alpha variants and reinforced doors.

The top end variants in the cars get a HUD, Panoramic Sunroof, (standard in Hyryder and optional on the Grand Vitara) all-black/ brown-black interior, fully digital driver's display, 9-inch SmartPlay Pro touchscreen with USB, Bluetooth, Android Auto And Apple CarPlay connectivity, ventilated front seats, rear wiper and washer, 8-way electrically adjustable driver seat, cruise control, 17-inch diamond-cut alloys, 360-degree camera, and much more.

Standard features across the range include 6 airbags, seatbelt reminders for all seats, DRLs, Projector Headlamps, rear parking sensors, push-start button and turn indicators on ORVMs.

=== Indonesia ===
On 16 February 2023, the Grand Vitara was revealed for the Indonesian market at the 30th Indonesia International Motor Show. Sales later commenced at the 2nd Gaikindo Jakarta Auto Week on 10 March. It is only available with a mild hybrid drivetrain powered by the 1.5-litre K15C engine paired with a 6-speed automatic transmission, and is available in GL and GX grade levels.

In November 2025, the GL grade was discontinued, while the GX grade was updated with new alloy wheels, a TFT instrument cluster, revised interior lighting, ventilated front seats, and an electric parking brake.

=== GCC ===
The Grand Vitara for the GCC markets was unveiled on 1 April 2023. It is only available as the mild hybrid powered by a 1.5-litre K15C engine paired with a 6-speed automatic transmission and is available in GL and GLX grade levels.

The Toyota Urban Cruiser was unveiled on 30 April 2023. It is powered by a 1.5-litre K15C engine paired with a mild hybrid system and a 6-speed automatic transmission and is available in GL and GLX grade levels.

=== South Africa ===
The Grand Vitara went on sale in South Africa on 19 April 2023, after being introduced in August 2022. Available grade levels are GL, GLX, and GLX AllGrip. The latter is equipped with a 1.5-litre K15C mild hybrid powertrain with 6-speed automatic transmission, while the front-wheel drive model is powered with a 1.5-litre K15B engine paired with either a 5-speed manual transmission or 4-speed automatic transmission.

The Toyota Urban Cruiser went on sale in the country on 22 April 2023. Available grade levels are Xs and XR, which are powered by a 1.5-litre K15B engine paired with either a 5-speed manual transmission or 4-speed automatic transmission with no hybrid powertrain options. It is positioned below the locally produced Corolla Cross.

=== Brunei ===
The Grand Vitara went on sale in Brunei on 17 May 2024, in a sole variant which is powered with a 1.5-litre K15B engine paired with 4-speed automatic transmission.

== Powertrain ==
The mild hybrid model, marketed as "Smart Hybrid" by Suzuki and "neoDRIVE" by Toyota in India, uses Suzuki's 1.5-liter K15C four-cylinder engine and the Smart Hybrid system developed by Suzuki. For the strong hybrid model, Suzuki incorporated the Toyota Hybrid System to the vehicle (marketed as "Intelligent Electric Hybrid" by Suzuki), which includes Toyota's 1.5-liter M15D-FXE three-cylinder engine similar to the XP210 series Toyota Yaris / Yaris Cross. This version is only available in India. Both engines met the Bharat Stage VI (BS-VI) emission standards.

Type	Engine code	Displ.	Power	Torque	Combined system output	Electric motor	Battery	Transmission	Layout	Calendar years
Petrol	K15B	1,462 cc (1.5 L) I4	77 kW (103 hp; 105 PS) @ 6,000 rpm	138 N⋅m (14.1 kg⋅m; 102 lb⋅ft) @ 4,400 rpm	-	-	-	5-speed manual; 4-speed automatic	FWD	2023–present (not available in India)
Petrol mild hybrid	K15C	1,462 cc (1.5 L) I4	76 kW (102 hp; 103 PS) @ 6,000 rpm	137 N⋅m (14.0 kg⋅m; 101 lb⋅ft) @ 4,400 rpm	-	ISG	12 V - 6 Ah lithium-ion	5-speed manual; 6-speed automatic	FWD	2022–present
Petrol mild hybrid	K15C	1,462 cc (1.5 L) I4	76 kW (102 hp; 103 PS) @ 6,000 rpm	137 N⋅m (14.0 kg⋅m; 101 lb⋅ft) @ 4,400 rpm	-	ISG	12 V - 6 Ah lithium-ion	5-speed manual; 6-speed automatic	AWD	2022–present
Petrol/ CNG	K15C	1,462 cc (1.5 L) I4	Petrol: 74 kW (99 hp; 101 PS) @ 6,000 rpm CNG: 64.6 kW (87 hp; 88 PS) @ 5,500 rpm	Petrol: 136 N⋅m (13.9 kg⋅m; 100 lb⋅ft) @ 4,400 rpm CNG: 121.5 N⋅m (12.4 kg⋅m; 89.6 lb⋅ft) @ 4,400 rpm	-	-	-	5-speed manual	FWD	2023–present (only available in India)
Petrol hybrid	Toyota M15D-FXE	1,490 cc (1.5 L) I3	Engine: 68 kW (91 hp; 92 PS) @ 5,500 rpm Motor: 59 kW (79 hp; 80 PS)	Engine: 122 N⋅m (12.4 kg⋅m; 90.0 lb⋅ft) @ 4,400–4,800 rpm Motor: 141 N⋅m (14.4 kg⋅m; 104 lb⋅ft)	85 kW (114 hp; 116 PS)	1NM AC synchronous	0.76 kWh, 177.6 V lithium-ion	eCVT	FWD	2022–present (only available in India)

== Reception ==
In their review of the Grand Vitara Hybrid, Autocar India commended the vehicle's styling. They specifically lauded the Toyota-engineered strong hybrid system, describing it as "exceptional." However, the review criticised its limited boot space and a perceived lack of performance "punch" in the strong hybrid model. Evo India described the ride quality as "so sorted," due to its suspension tuning being "just right for our (Indian) roads," while commenting about its lack of horsepower.

== Sales ==
Year	India		South Africa		Indonesia	Mexico	Colombia
Year	Suzuki	Toyota	Suzuki	Toyota	Indonesia	Mexico	Colombia
2022	23,425	11,864					
2023	113,387	43,682 (Note: January–August, September–October and November–December.)	2,621	5,992	1,575	876	704
2024					2,466	3,822	
