= Maruti XA Alpha =

Maruti Suzuki XA Alpha

Overview
- Manufacturer: Maruti Suzuki
- Production: 2013
- Assembly: Haryana, India

Body and chassis
- Class: Concept car
- Body style: 5-door SUV
- Layout: FF layout

Powertrain
- Engine: K-series petrol I4; DDiS Diesel engine

Dimensions
- Wheelbase: 2.5 metres (98.4 in)
- Length: 4 metres (157.5 in)
- Width: 1.9 metres (74.8 in)

Chronology
- Successor: Vitara Brezza

The Maruti Suzuki XA Alpha is a concept car produced by Maruti Suzuki in India. It was unveiled on 28 May 2013.

After several design changes, it came to market in 2016 as the Vitara Brezza.

== Specifications ==
The XA Alpha was intended to cost under 1 million Rupees in its final version. The XA Alpha has a seating capacity of 5 people

The petrol version utilises the Suzuki K-series petrol engine expected to fit up to 1.4 litres, whereas the diesel version uses an engine supplied by Fiat.

== See also ==
- Maruti
- Maruti Swift
- Maruti Suzuki Kizashi
- Maruti Exports
- Automotive industry in India
- Suzuki & Maruti Suzuki
- Maruti 800
