= Suzuki Victoris =

Subcompact crossover SUV produced by Suzuki

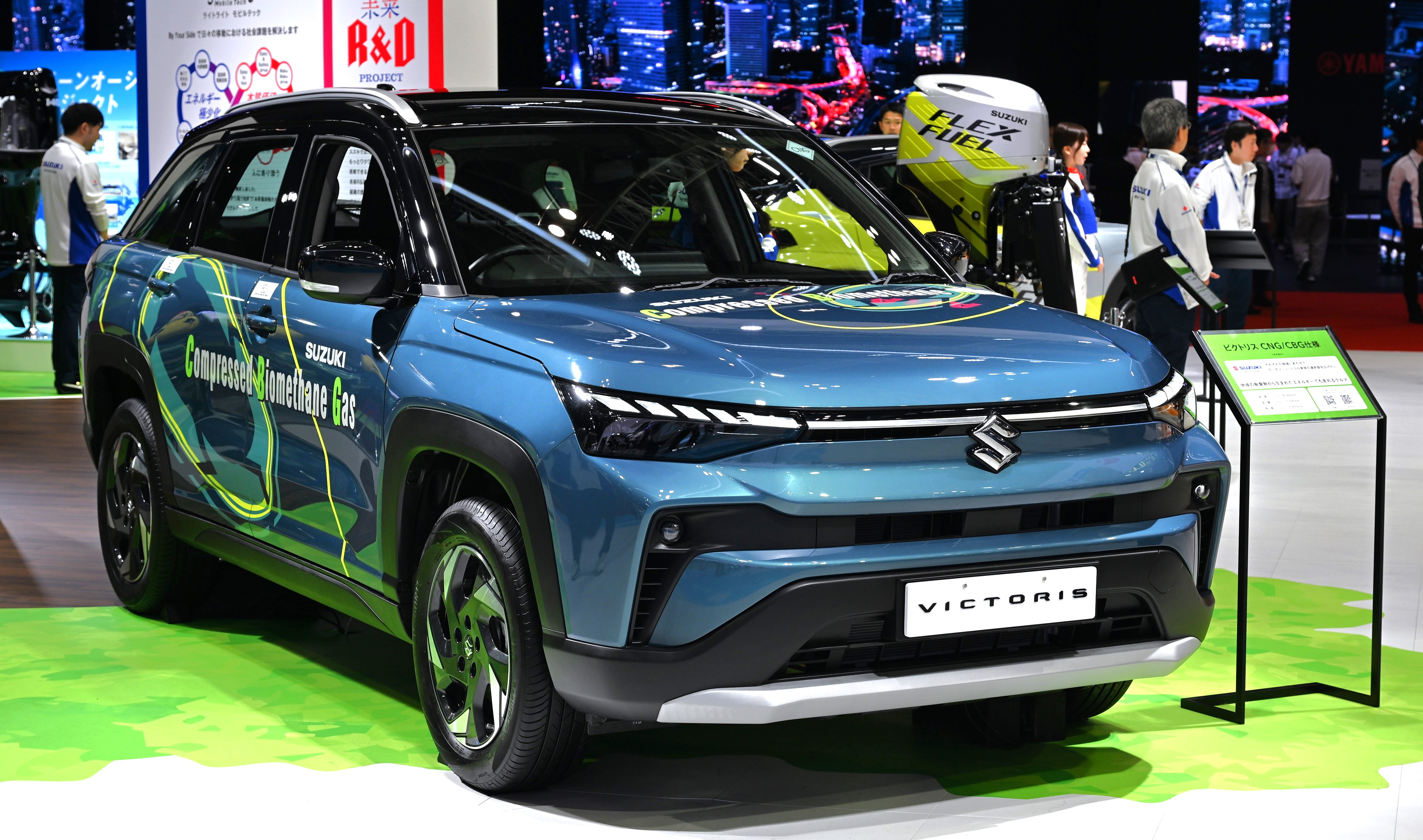
- Suzuki Victoris CBG (Compressed Biomethane Gas) showcased in Japan

Overview
- Manufacturer: Suzuki
- Also called: Suzuki Across (export)
- Production: September 2025 – present
- Assembly: India: Kharkhoda, Haryana (Maruti Suzuki)

Body and chassis
- Class: Subcompact crossover SUV
- Body style: 5-door SUV
- Layout: Front-engine, front-wheel-drive; Front-engine, four-wheel-drive (mild hybrid)
- Platform: Suzuki Global C platform
- Related: Suzuki Grand Vitara (YK); Suzuki SX4 S-Cross; Suzuki Vitara (LY); Suzuki Brezza

Powertrain
- Engine: Petrol: 1462 cc K15C I4 mild hybrid; Petrol/CNG: 1462 cc K15C I4; Petrol hybrid: 1490 cc Toyota M15D-FXE I3
- Electric motor: Integrated Starter Generator (ISG) (mild hybrid); 1NM AC synchronous (strong hybrid)
- Transmission: 5-speed manual; 6-speed automatic (mild hybrid); e-Drive eCVT (strong hybrid)
- Hybrid drivetrain: Mild hybrid (Smart Hybrid); Power-split hybrid
- Battery: 48 V lithium-ion (mild hybrid); 0.76 kWh lithium-ion (strong hybrid)

Dimensions
- Wheelbase: 2,600 mm (102.4 in)
- Length: 4,360 mm (171.7 in)
- Width: 1,795 mm (70.7 in)
- Height: 1,655 mm (65.2 in)
- Kerb weight: 1,145–1,305 kg (2,524–2,877 lb); 1,230–1,245 kg (2,712–2,745 lb) (petrol/CNG); 1,250–1,295 kg (2,756–2,855 lb) (hybrid)

Chronology
- Predecessor: Suzuki Grand Vitara (Mexico); Suzuki S-Cross (Mexico)

The Suzuki Victoris or Across is a subcompact crossover SUV (B-segment) produced by Suzuki in India since 2025. It was released on 3 September 2025 in India to complement the similarly sized Suzuki Grand Vitara. The vehicle was developed by Suzuki using the Global C platform.

In India, the model is exclusively available at the Maruti Suzuki Arena dealership chain, whilst the Grand Vitara is exclusively available at the Nexa dealership chain. It will be produced in India with export plans to more than 100 countries.

== Features ==
The top-spec Victoris/Across come equipped a 10.1-inch digital instrument panel, 10.25-inch touchscreen infotainment screen, voice assistant through Amazon Alexa (in India), Suzuki Maps with traffic and speed recognition, an eight speaker Infinity audio system with Dolby Atmos surround sound, panoramic sunroof, eight-way power-adjustable ventilated front seats, 64-colour ambient lights, and powered tailgate with gesture control.

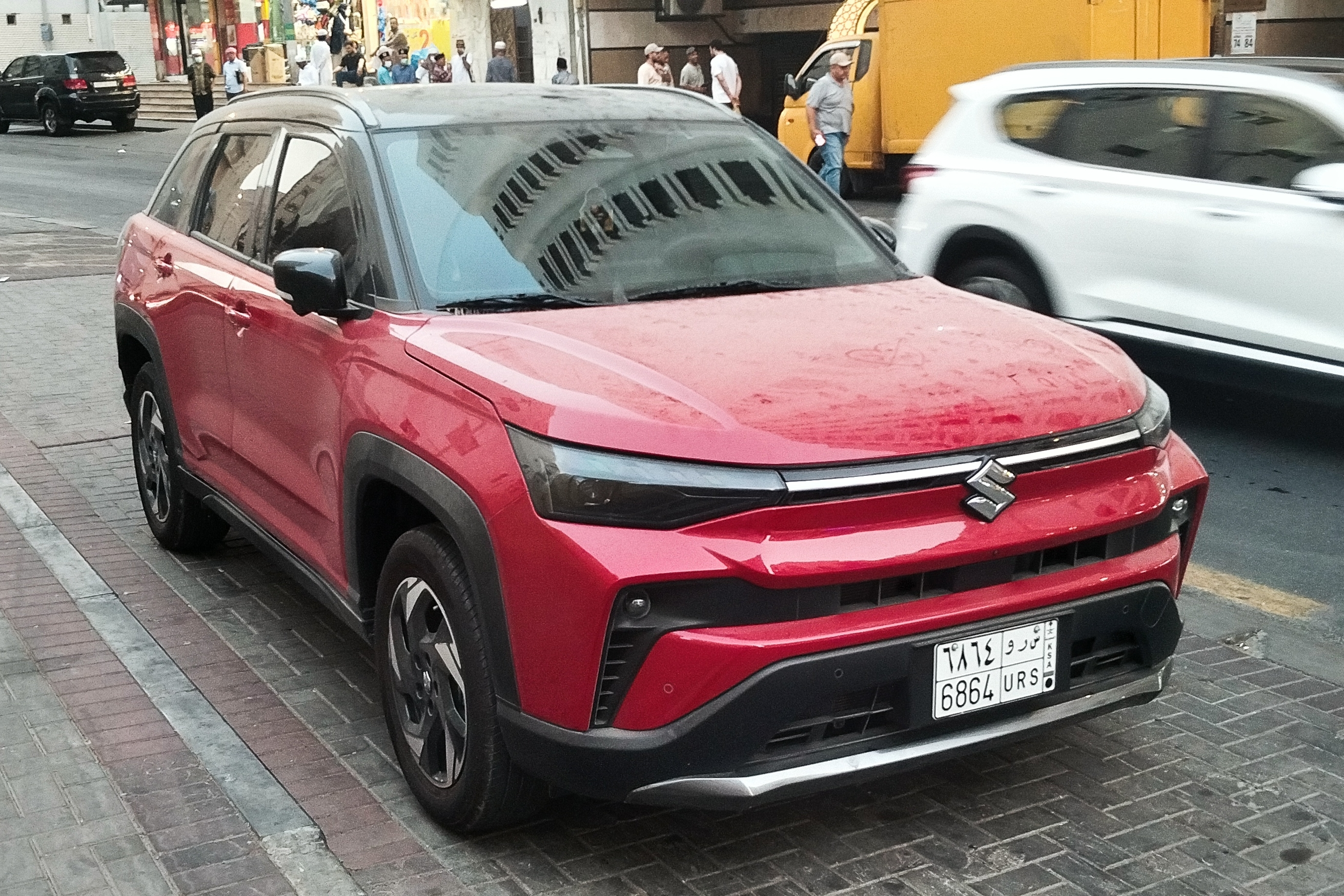
Suzuki Across GLX Hybrid (Saudi Arabia)

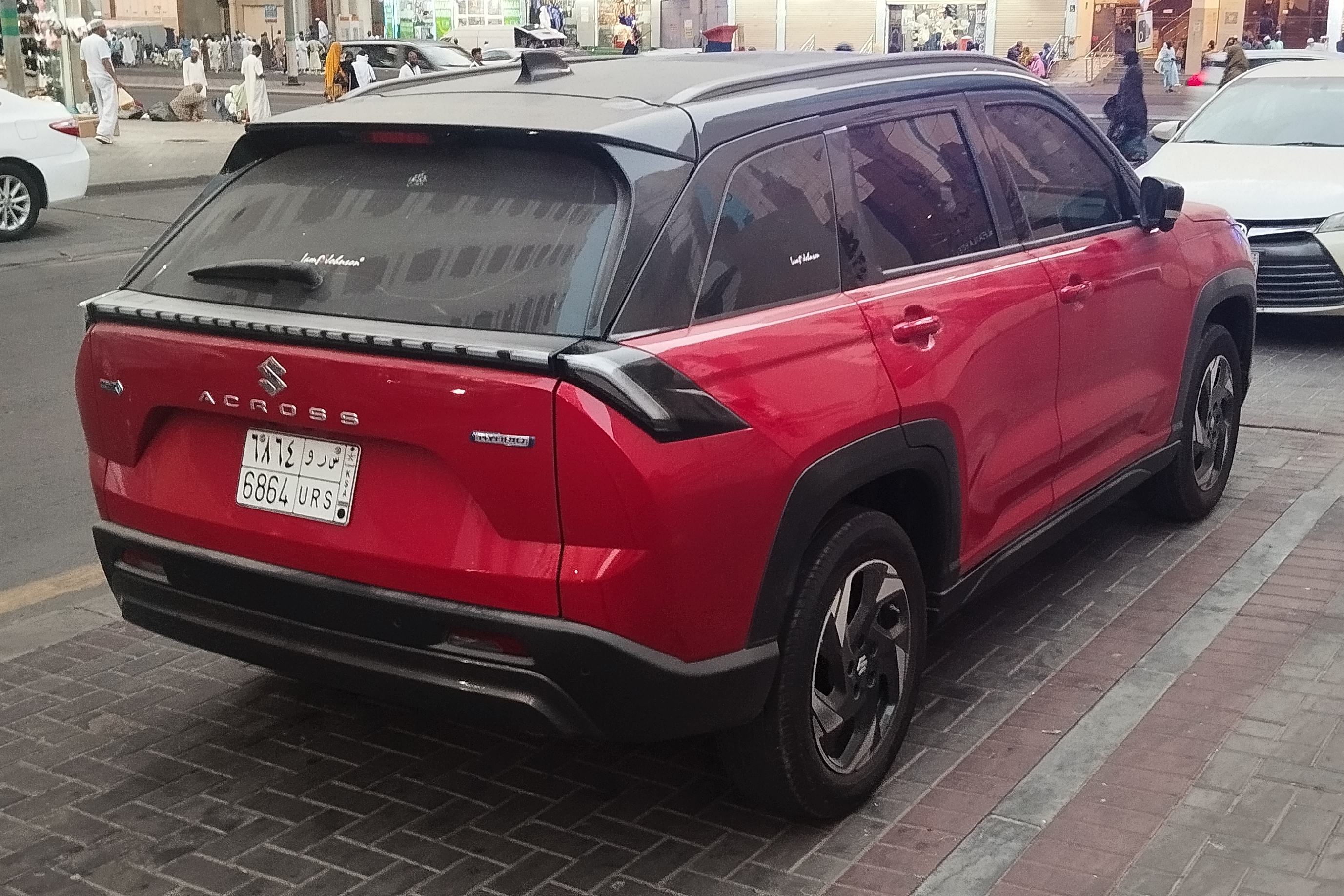
Suzuki Across GLX Hybrid (Saudi Arabia)

== Markets ==
=== Argentina ===
The Across was launched in Argentina on 5 August 2026, with two trim levels: GL and GLX, both variants are powered by the K15C 1.5-litre petrol MHEV paired with a 6-speed automatic.

=== India ===
The Victoris in India is available in eight variants across FWD and AWD configurations, which are LXi, VXi, ZXi, ZXi (O), ZXi+, ZXi+ (O), ZXi+ 4WD, and ZXi+(O) AWD.

=== South Africa ===
The Across went on sale in South Africa on 11 March 2026, with the two grades: GL and GLX. For powertrains, all variants are powered by the K15C 1.5-litre petrol MHEV paired with either a 5-speed manual (standard on GL) or 6-speed automatic (standard on GLX, optional on GL).

=== Mexico ===
The Across was launched in Mexico on 26 August 2026, in the sole Boostergreen variant powered by the K15C 1.5-litre petrol MHEV paired with a 6-speed automatic. It replaces the Grand Vitara and the S-Cross, which were discontinued due to poor sales.

=== Middle East ===
The Across was unveiled in the Middle Eastern markets in May 2026.

== Powertrain ==
The Victoris/Across shares identical powertrain options with the Grand Vitara. This includes a mild hybrid model, marketed as "Smart Hybrid" by Suzuki, using the 1.5-liter K15C four-cylinder engine.

For the strong hybrid model in India, the Victoris adopted the Toyota Hybrid System (marketed as "Intelligent Electric Hybrid" by Suzuki), which includes Toyota's 1.5-liter M15D-FXE three-cylinder engine.

A CNG-powered model is also available using the 1.5-liter K15C four-cylinder engine. It is equipped with an underbody CNG tank, making it the first passenger car in the world to adopt such CNG tank position.

Type	Engine code	Displ.	Power	Torque	Combined system output	Electric motor	Battery	Transmission	Layout	Calendar years
Petrol mild hybrid	K15C	1,462 cc (1.5 L) I4	76 kW (102 hp; 103 PS) @ 6,000 rpm	137 N⋅m (14.0 kg⋅m; 101 lb⋅ft) @ 4,400 rpm	-	ISG	12 V - 6 Ah lithium-ion	5-speed manual; 6-speed automatic	FWD	2025–present
Petrol mild hybrid	K15C	1,462 cc (1.5 L) I4	76 kW (102 hp; 103 PS) @ 6,000 rpm	137 N⋅m (14.0 kg⋅m; 101 lb⋅ft) @ 4,400 rpm	-	ISG	12 V - 6 Ah lithium-ion	5-speed manual; 6-speed automatic	AWD	2025–present
Petrol/ CNG	K15C	1,462 cc (1.5 L) I4	Petrol: 74 kW (99 hp; 101 PS) @ 6,000 rpm CNG: 64.6 kW (87 hp; 88 PS) @ 5,500 rpm	Petrol: 136 N⋅m (13.9 kg⋅m; 100 lb⋅ft) @ 4,400 rpm CNG: 121.5 N⋅m (12.4 kg⋅m; 89.6 lb⋅ft) @ 4,400 rpm	-	-	-	5-speed manual	FWD	2025–present (India only)
Petrol hybrid	Toyota M15D-FXE	1,490 cc (1.5 L) I3	Engine: 68 kW (91 hp; 92 PS) @ 5,500 rpm Motor: 59 kW (79 hp; 80 PS)	Engine: 122 N⋅m (12.4 kg⋅m; 90.0 lb⋅ft) @ 4,400–4,800 rpm Motor: 141 N⋅m (14.4 kg⋅m; 104 lb⋅ft)	85 kW (114 hp; 116 PS)	1NM AC synchronous	0.76 kWh, 177.6 V lithium-ion	eCVT	FWD	2025–present (India only)

== Safety ==
=== Bharat NCAP ===
The Victoris received 5 stars for adult occupants and 5 stars for toddlers from Bharat NCAP in a 2025 testing (based on Latin NCAP 2016). With 31.66 / 32 points in Adult Occupant Protection (AOP) and 43.00 / 49 points in Child Occupant Protection (COP).

Bharat NCAP test results Maruti Suzuki Victoris (2025, based on Latin NCAP 2016)
Test	Score	Stars
Adult occupant protection	31.66/32.00	5 /5 stars
Child occupant protection	43.00/49.00	5 /5 stars

=== Global NCAP ===
The Victoris for India received 5 stars for adult occupants and 5 stars for toddlers as the first vehicle tested by Global NCAP 2.5 in September 2025 (similar to Latin NCAP 2019).

Global NCAP 2.5 test results (India) Maruti Suzuki Victoris (September 2025, similar to Latin NCAP 2019)
Test	Score	Stars
Adult occupant protection	33.72/34.00	5 /5 stars
Child occupant protection	41.00/49.00	5 /5 stars
