= Bidadi =

Town in Ramanagara, District, Karnataka, India

- Town
- Location in Karnataka, India
- Coordinates: 12.867°N 77.40°E
- Country: India
- State: Karnataka
- District: Bengaluru South

Government
  - Body: Town Municipal Council

Area
  - Total: 18.87 km^{2} (7.29 sq mi)

Population (2011)
  - Total: 29,825
  - Density: 1,581/km^{2} (4,094/sq mi)

Languages
  - Official: Kannada
- Time zone: UTC+5:30 (IST)
- PIN: 562109
- ISO 3166 code: IN-KA
- Vehicle registration: KA-42
- Website: www.bidaditown.mrc.gov.in

Bidadi is a town situated on the Bengaluru – Mysuru expressway and is part of the Ramnagar in the state of Karnataka. The town is located 32 km from Bangalore towards Mysuru and is connected by both rail and bus to Bengaluru City. It is famous for a food dish called the "Thatte Idli" which is a larger flatter variant of the traditional south Indian idli. Bidadi is also a hobli in the Ramanagara taluk and vokkaliga form the majority of population.

== Education ==
Bidadi is home to the following schools – Jnana Vikas National Public School, Vagdevi Vilas School, St. Thomas Residential School, Suvishesha Gnana Peetha School, Thyagaraja Central School, JVS, Basaveshwara High School, Government School, and Simran School. Two nursing schools are also in Bidadi – Subhash Nursing School and Ikon College of Nursing.

== Industries ==
The automobile manufacturer Toyota has its subsidiarity unit Toyota Kirloskar Motors located in Bidadi. Other major industries in the area include Bosch, Britannia and Coca-Cola.

== Attractions ==
The main attractions of the town are Wonder La, Jollywood, Meher Baba Universal Spiritual Center, Innovative Film City and Eagleton Golf Resort, CSK Stay Inn, and Sarojamma Chikkatimahaiah Kalyana Mandapa. The Nelliguda Lake is also a common hangout spot among residents.
