= Baojun Yunduo =

Battery electric compact hatchback

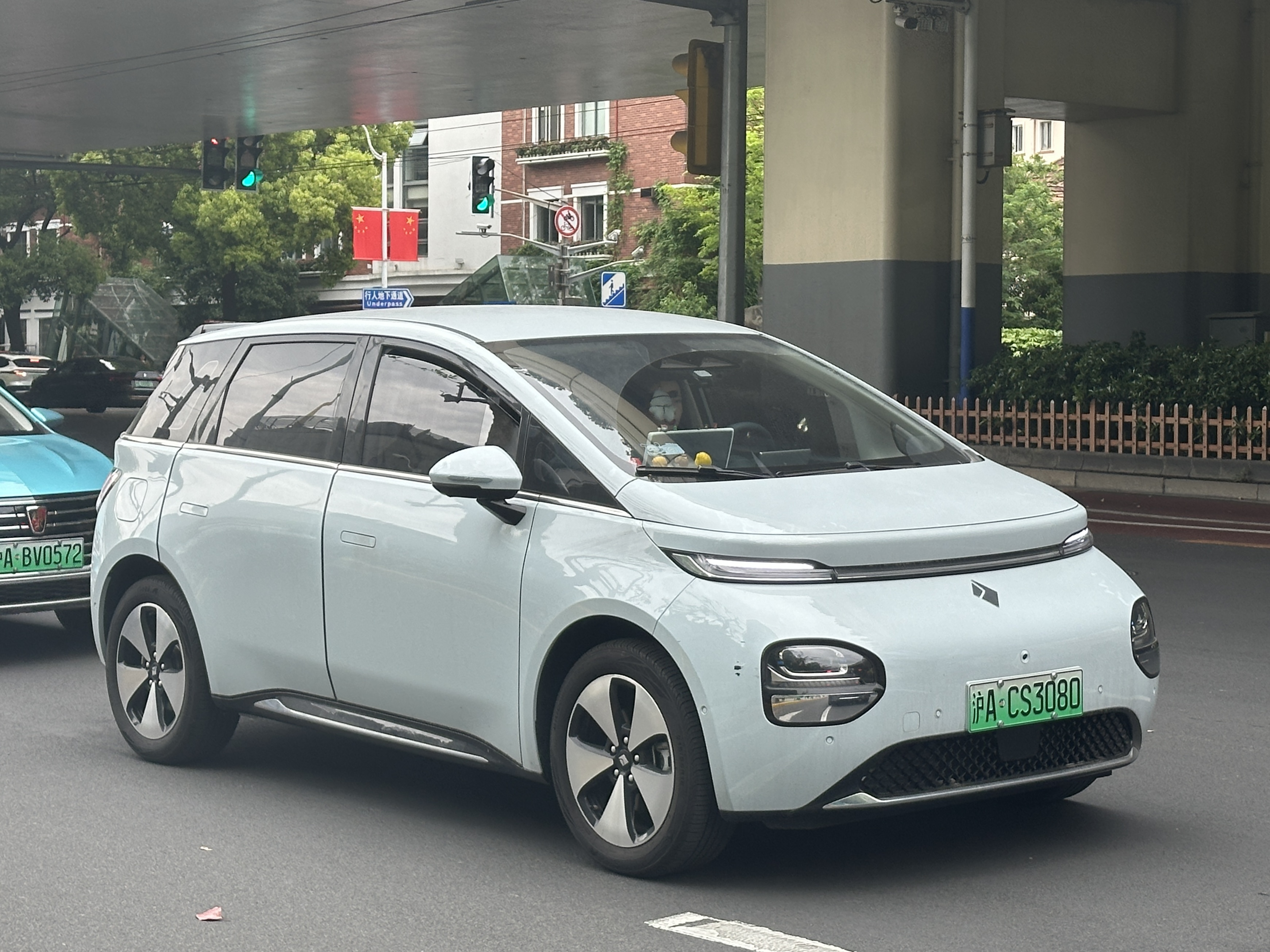

Overview
- Manufacturer: SAIC-GM-Wuling
- Model code: EQ100
- Also called: MG Windsor EV (India); Wuling Cloud EV (Indonesia)
- Production: 2023–2025 (China); 2024–present (export)
- Assembly: China: Liuzhou, Guangxi; Indonesia: Cikarang, West Java (SGMW Indonesia); India: Halol, Gujarat (JSW MG Motor India)

Body and chassis
- Class: Small family car (C)
- Body style: 5-door hatchback
- Layout: Front-motor, front-wheel-drive

Powertrain
- Electric motor: Permanent magnet synchronous
- Power output: 100 kW (134 hp; 136 PS)
- Battery: 37.9 kW⋅h lithium-iron phosphate (360); 50.6 kW⋅h lithium-iron phosphate (460)
- Electric range: 360–460 km (224–286 mi)
- Plug-in charging: AC: 3.3 kW (360); 6.6 kW (460)

Dimensions
- Wheelbase: 2,700 mm (106.3 in)
- Length: 4,295 mm (169.1 in)
- Width: 1,850 mm (72.8 in)
- Height: 1,652 mm (65.0 in)
- Kerb weight: 1,495–1,615 kg (3,296–3,560 lb)

The Baojun Yunduo (Chinese: 宝骏云朵; pinyin: Bǎojùn Yúnduǒ; lit. 'Treasured horse cloud'), also spelled Yun Duo, and known as the Baojun Cloud in English sources, is a battery electric compact hatchback manufactured by SAIC-GM-Wuling (SGMW) since 2023 under the Baojun brand. It was introduced in China in May 2023 as the first five-door battery electric vehicle marketed by Baojun. It is marketed as the Wuling Cloud EV in Indonesia, and as the MG Windsor EV in India.

== Overview ==
The Yunduo was developed under the codename EQ100 was unveiled in May 2023, with pre-orders starting in June 2023 in China. Using the clouds as its design theme, it adopts Baojun's updated "Interstellar Geometry" design language, while featuring traditional MPV proportions, including a raked A-pillar, a long wheelbase that creates short overhangs, and a large windshield and greenhouse. The model was launched with three sky-inspired colors called Cloud Sea White, Cloud Twilight Purple and Cloud Smoke Qing. It will feature an ADAS safety package from drone maker DJI, which already supplies the technology to other Baojun models.

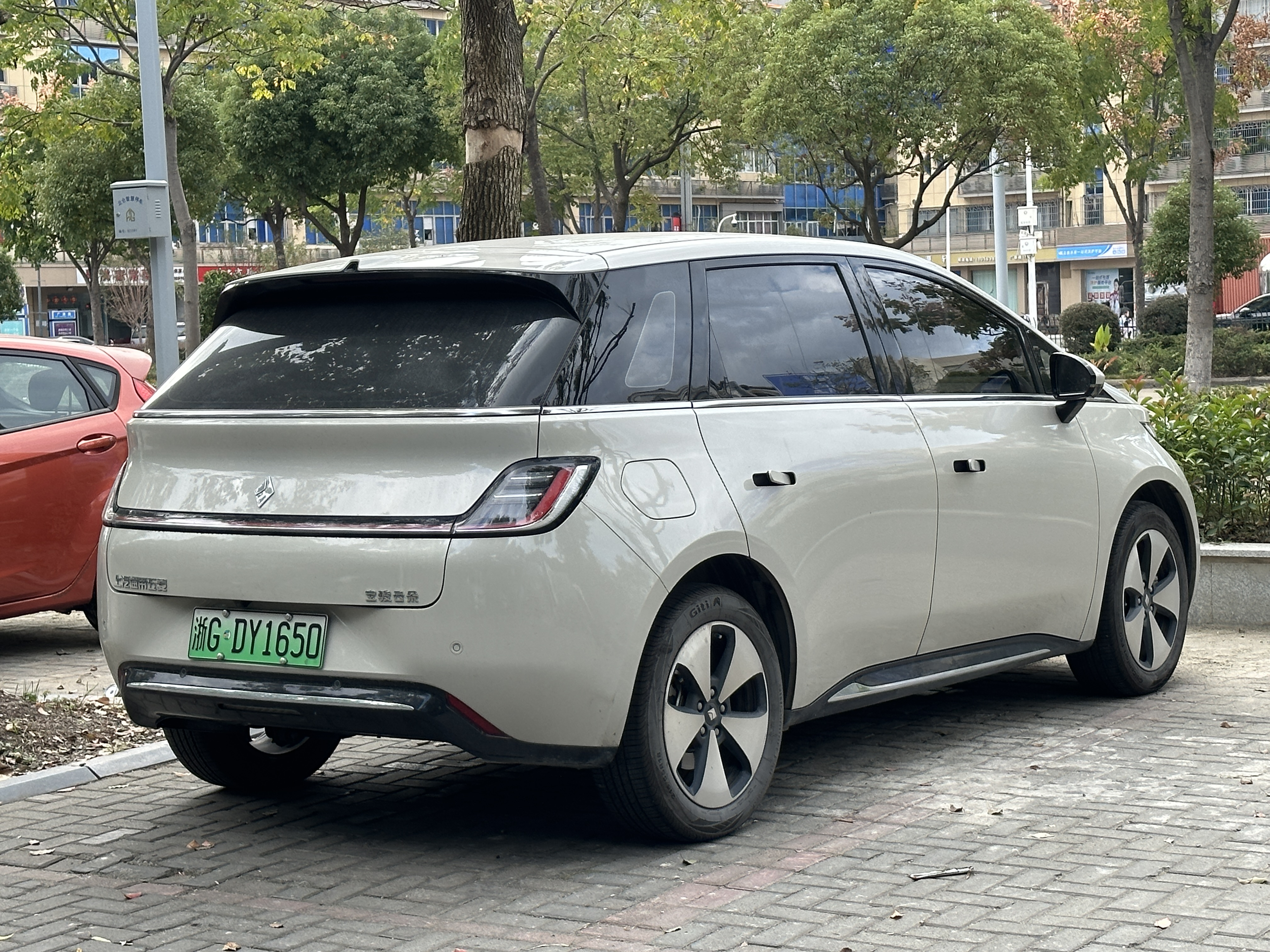
Rear view

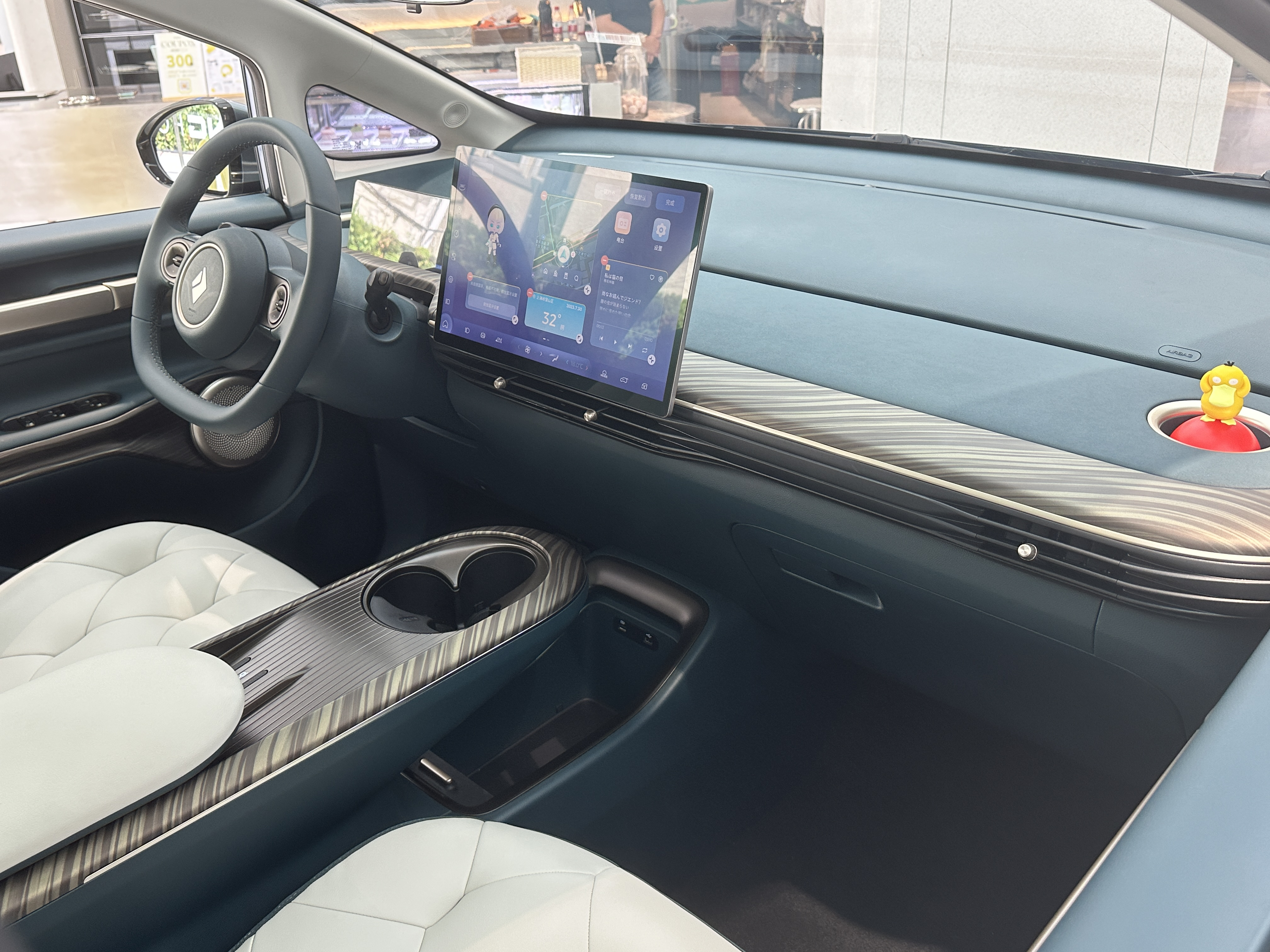
Interior

== Powertrain ==
The Yunduo is powered by a single electric motor that produces maximum power of 100 kW (134 hp; 136 PS). The top speed is limited to 150 km/h (93 mph). The battery uses a lithium-iron phosphate (LFP) unit produced by Liuzhou Huating New Energy Technology with the capacity of 50.6 kWh. The battery adopts a liquid-cooled thermal management system, and according to SGMW, it can be charged from 30% to 80% in half an hour.

== Rebadged model ==
=== MG Windsor EV ===
The Yunduo was unveiled in India on 11 September 2024 as the MG Windsor EV. It is available in three trim variants: Excite, Exclusive and Essence; all variants use a 38 kW battery pack with a claimed range of 331 km (206 mi).

On 6 May 2025, the MG Windsor EV Pro was added with new upgrades, featuring a 52.9 kW battery pack, ADAS Level-2, Powered Tailgate new alloy wheels and new colours; Aurora Silver, Celadon Blue and Glaze Red.

Windsor has been hailed as the best selling EV car in India for the past one year.

The MG Windsor EV Indulge Edition is a limited-run variant of the MG Windsor EV, launched in India on 13 October 2026 at ₹17.89 lakh (ex-showroom); it adds Shadow Gold dual-tone styling, black 18-inch alloys, Urban Tan-and-Black upholstery, Indulge badging, and a rear-seat "Prive Screen," while using the 38 kWh battery, 136 PS front-mounted motor, and 332 km claimed range.

=== Wuling Cloud EV ===
The Yunduo is sold in Indonesia as the Wuling Cloud EV, which was introduced at the 31st Indonesia International Motor Show on 15 February 2024. It went on sale on 15 May 2024 in a sole unnamed variant using the 50.6 kWh battery pack. In February 2025, the Cloud EV line-up was updated to include a new entry-level Lite variant and the sole unnamed variant became the Pro. The 2025 model received the more common CCS2 and Type 2 charging plugs to replace the previous GB/T charging plugs. In August 2026, an entry level variant called the SE was added, using the 38 kWh battery pack.

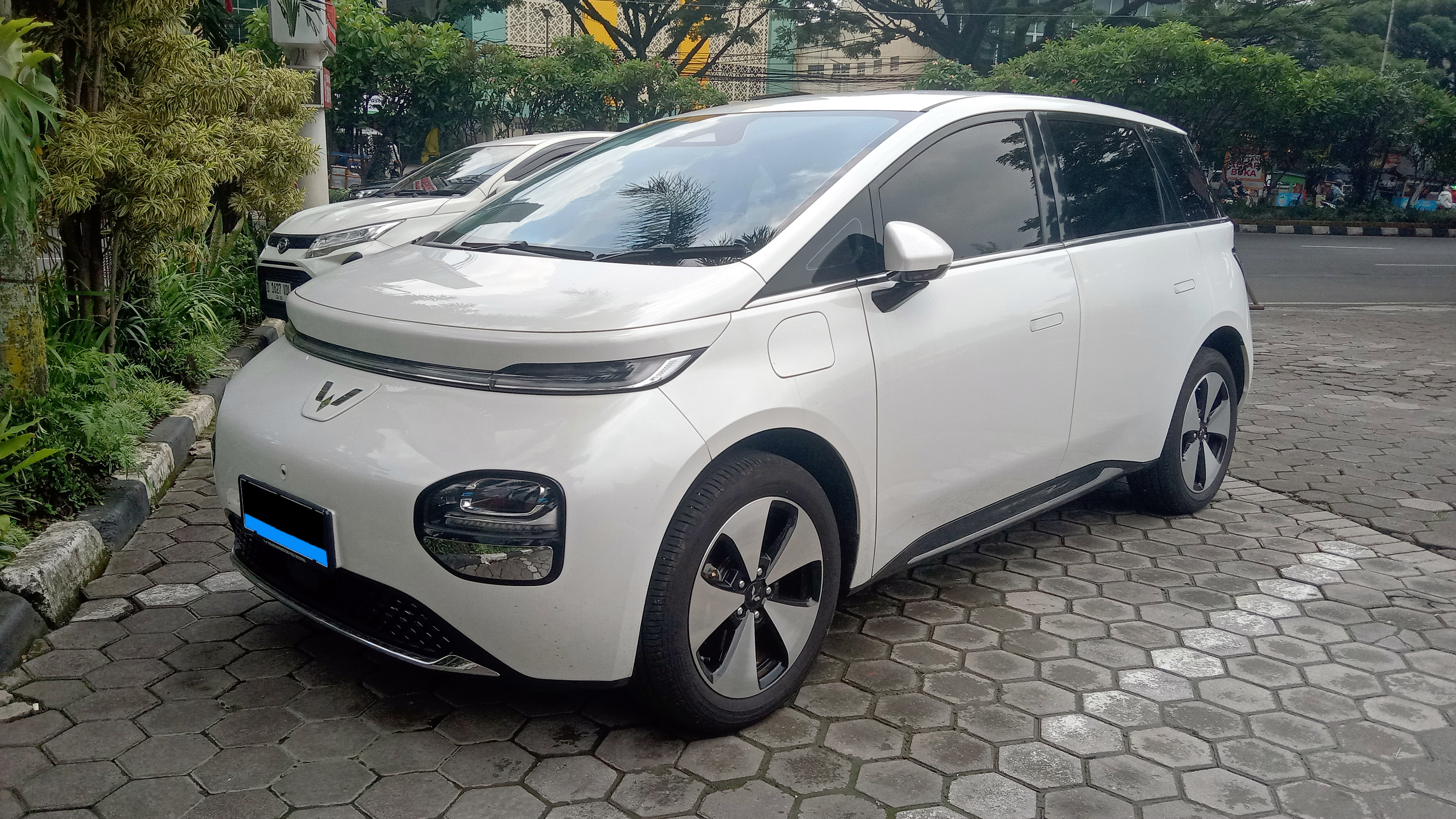
Wuling Cloud EV

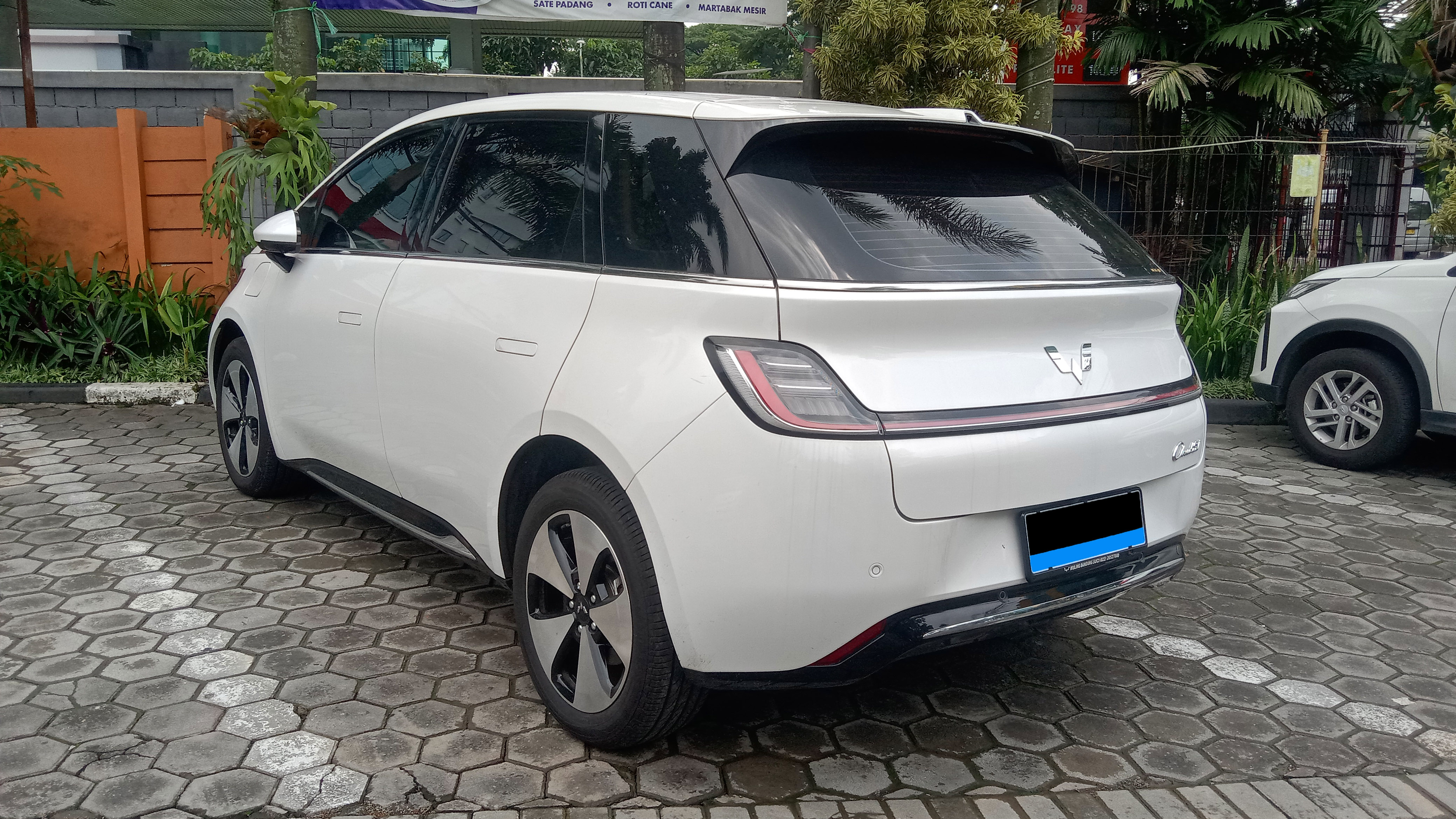
Rear view

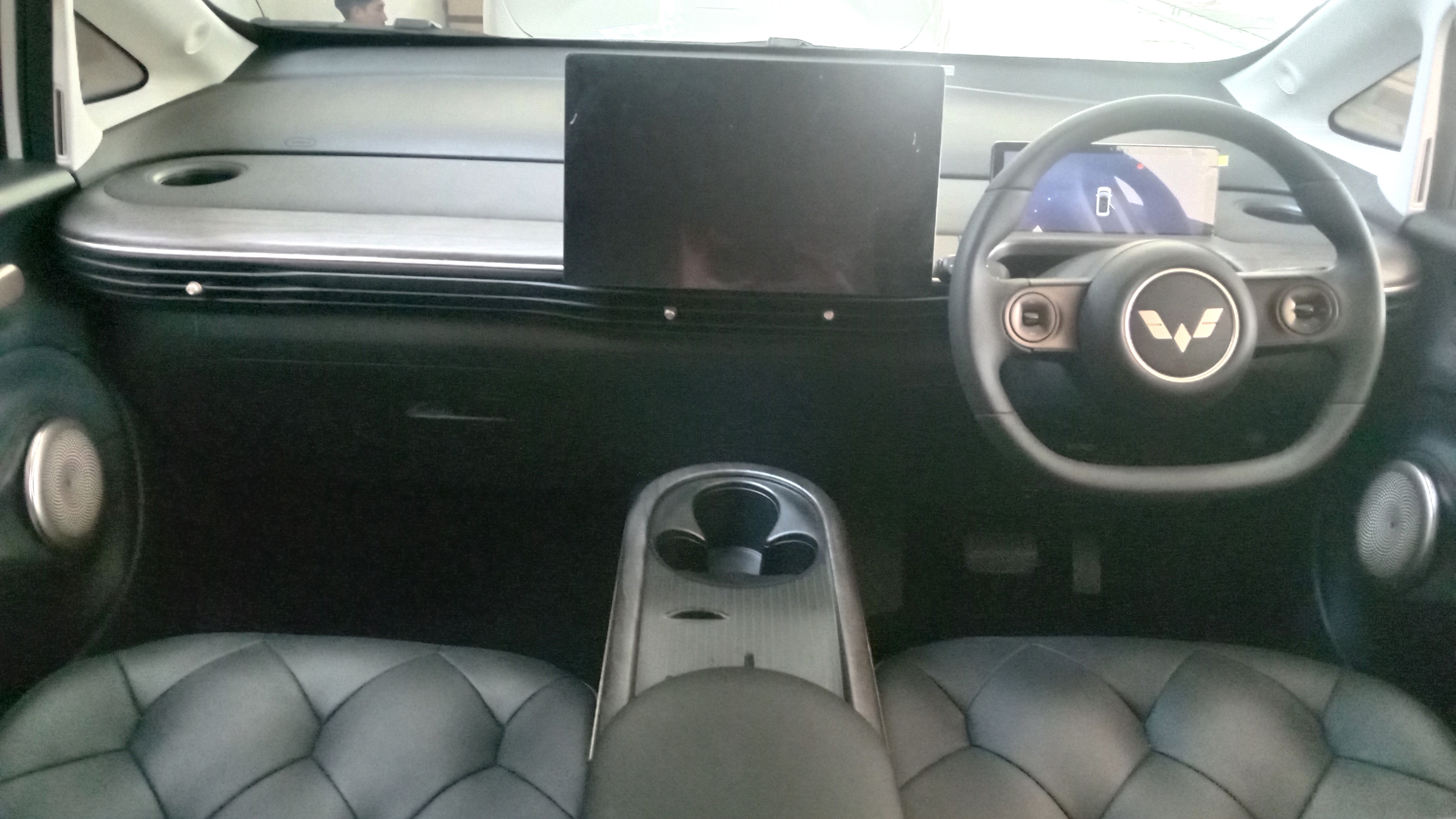
Interior

== Sales ==
Year	China	Indonesia	India
2023	11,519		
2024	14,578	3,521	13,997
2025	185	2,312	46,375
