= Suzuki Brezza =

Subcompact crossover SUV

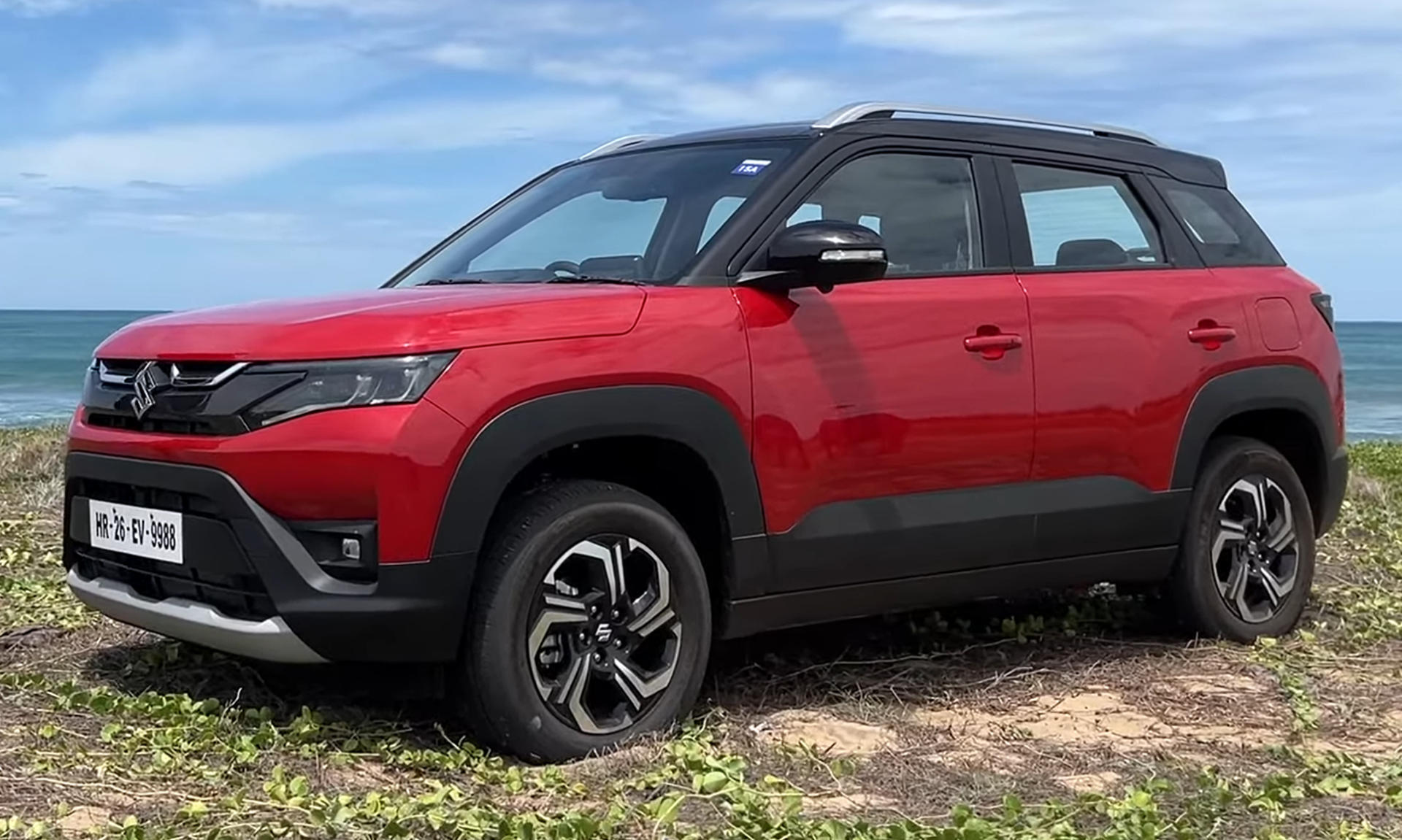
- 2022 Maruti Suzuki Brezza ZXi+

Overview
- Manufacturer: Suzuki
- Also called: Suzuki Vitara Brezza (2016–2022); Toyota Urban Cruiser (2020–2022)
- Production: January 2016 – present

Body and chassis
- Class: Subcompact SUV
- Body style: 5-door crossover SUV
- Layout: Front-engine, front-wheel-drive
- Platform: Suzuki Global C platform
- Related: Suzuki Vitara (LY); Suzuki SX4 S-Cross; Suzuki Grand Vitara (2022)

The Suzuki Brezza (known as Vitara Brezza for the first generation) is a subcompact SUV from Suzuki and manufactured by Maruti Suzuki in India. The Brezza is the first Suzuki-branded car which was fully developed in India. The model was designed as a smaller alternative to the global market Vitara and targeted to young audiences. It is only available for right-hand drive emerging markets in Asia and Africa. The first-generation model was also marketed by Toyota as the Toyota Urban Cruiser between 2020 and 2022.

As in the original Vitara model, the name "Vitara" is derived from English word "vital," as in "vitality," while the name "Brezza" means "breeze" in Italian.

== First generation (YF; 2016) ==
First generation
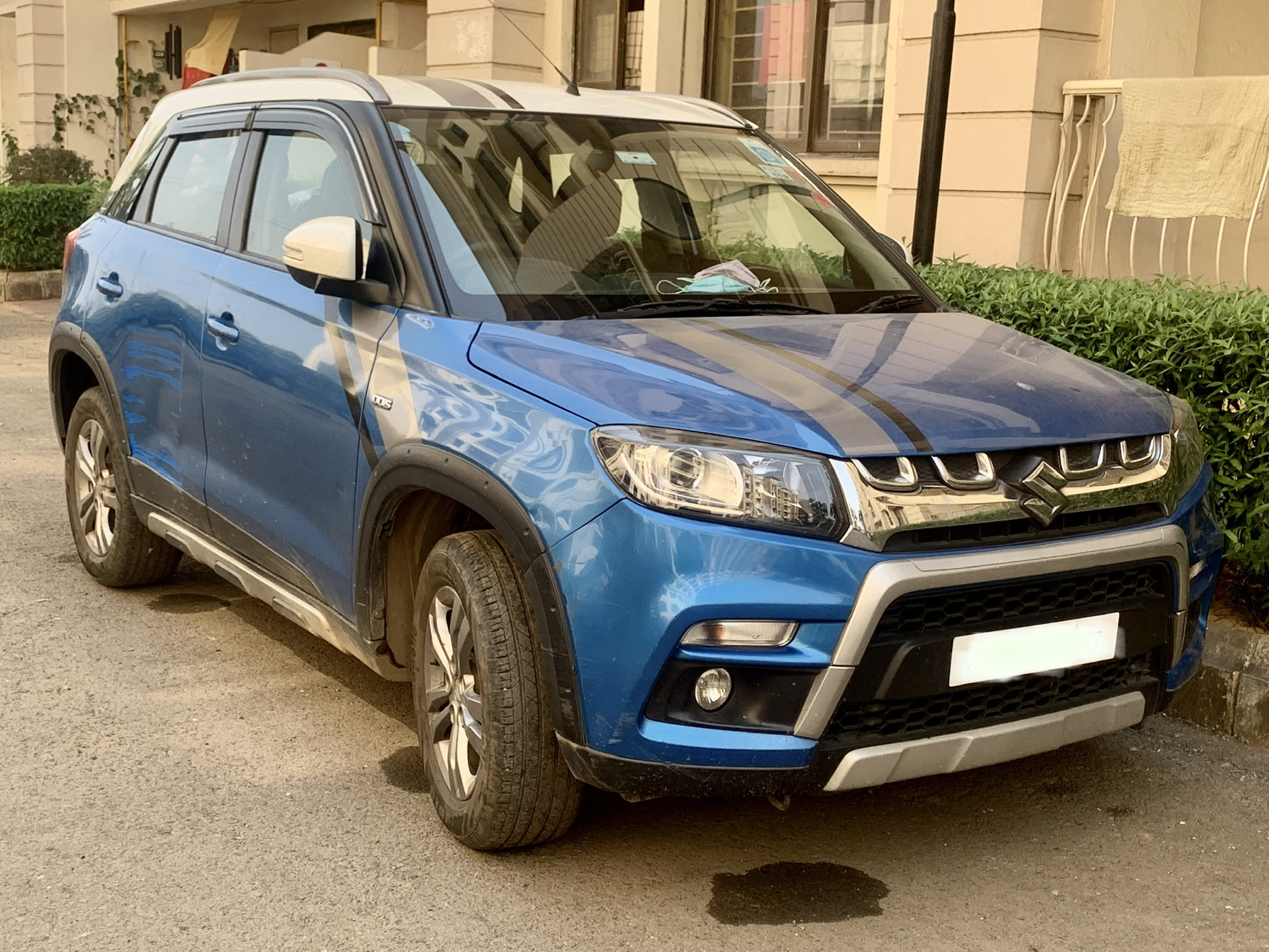
- Suzuki Vitara Brezza ZDi+ (pre-facelift)

Overview
- Model code: YF
- Also called: Suzuki Vitara Brezza; Toyota Urban Cruiser
- Production: January 2016 – June 2022
- Assembly: India: Gurgaon (Maruti Suzuki)

Powertrain
- Engine: Petrol: 1.5 L K15B I4 (mild hybrid, 2020–2022); Diesel: 1.3 L D13A DDiS I4 turbo (2016–2020)
- Electric motor: 1.77 kW (2.37 hp; 2.41 PS) Integrated Starter Generator (ISG) (mild hybrid)
- Power output: 77 kW (103 hp; 105 PS) (petrol); 66 kW (89 hp; 90 PS) (diesel)
- Transmission: 5-speed manual; 5-speed "AGS" AMT (diesel, 2016–2020); 4-speed automatic (petrol, 2020–2022)
- Hybrid drivetrain: 12 V SHVS mild hybrid (petrol)
- Battery: 6 Ah lithium-ion (mild hybrid)

Dimensions
- Wheelbase: 2,500 mm (98.4 in)
- Length: 3,995 mm (157.3 in)
- Width: 1,790 mm (70.5 in)
- Height: 1,640 mm (64.6 in)
- Kerb weight: 1,135–1,150 kg (2,502–2,535 lb) (petrol); 1,170–1,195 kg (2,579–2,635 lb) (diesel)

Chronology
- Successor: Toyota Urban Cruiser (2023) (Urban Cruiser); Toyota Urban Cruiser Taisor / Starlet Cross (Urban Cruiser)

The Vitara Brezza was first unveiled in India at the 13th Auto Expo in February 2016. It was previewed by the XA Alpha concept car that was showcased in 2012. The production model is built on global market Vitara's platform. In 2016, the vehicle contains 98 percent Indian parts.

The Vitara Brezza is Suzuki's first model in the sub-4 metre subcompact crossover SUV segment in India, which fits the lower bracket of India's GST structure.

Initially, the Vitara Brezza was solely powered by a 1.3-litre Fiat-sourced D13A DDiS four-cylinder turbo-diesel engine which produced 66 kW (89 hp; 90 PS) and 200 N⋅m (150 lb⋅ft) of torque. The engine is mated to either a 5-speed manual or a 5-speed automated manual transmission. The fuel economy is stated at 24.29 km/L (68.6 mpg_{‑imp}; 57.1 mpg_{‑US}). The diesel-powered Vitara Brezza is also exported to India's neighboring countries, such as to Nepal.

=== Facelift ===
The Vitara Brezza received its facelift in February 2020. The front bumper, skid plates, headlights, taillights, and wheels were redesigned. The sole turbo-diesel engine was replaced by a Bharat Stage 6 stage-compliant 1.5-litre K15B four-cylinder petrol engine. It produces 77 kW (103 hp; 105 PS) and 138 N⋅m (102 lb⋅ft) of torque. This engine is mated to either a 5-speed manual or 4-speed automatic transmission, both equipped with SHVS (Smart Hybrid Vehicle by Suzuki) mild hybrid system. The fuel economy is stated at 17.03 km/L (48.1 mpg_{‑imp}; 40.1 mpg_{‑US}) for the manual transmission option and 18.76 km/L (53.0 mpg_{‑imp}; 44.1 mpg_{‑US}) for the automatic unit. The newer engine made the Vitara Brezza lose its GST advantage as the engine displacement exceeded the 1,200 cc limit for petrol engines.

Suzuki expanded the export of the Vitara Brezza to several right-hand drive African and Brunei markets since 2021, which is enabled by the use of petrol engine that is more suitable for markets outside India. The SHVS mild hybrid system is only equipped for export models in South Asia, such as Bangladesh and Nepal.

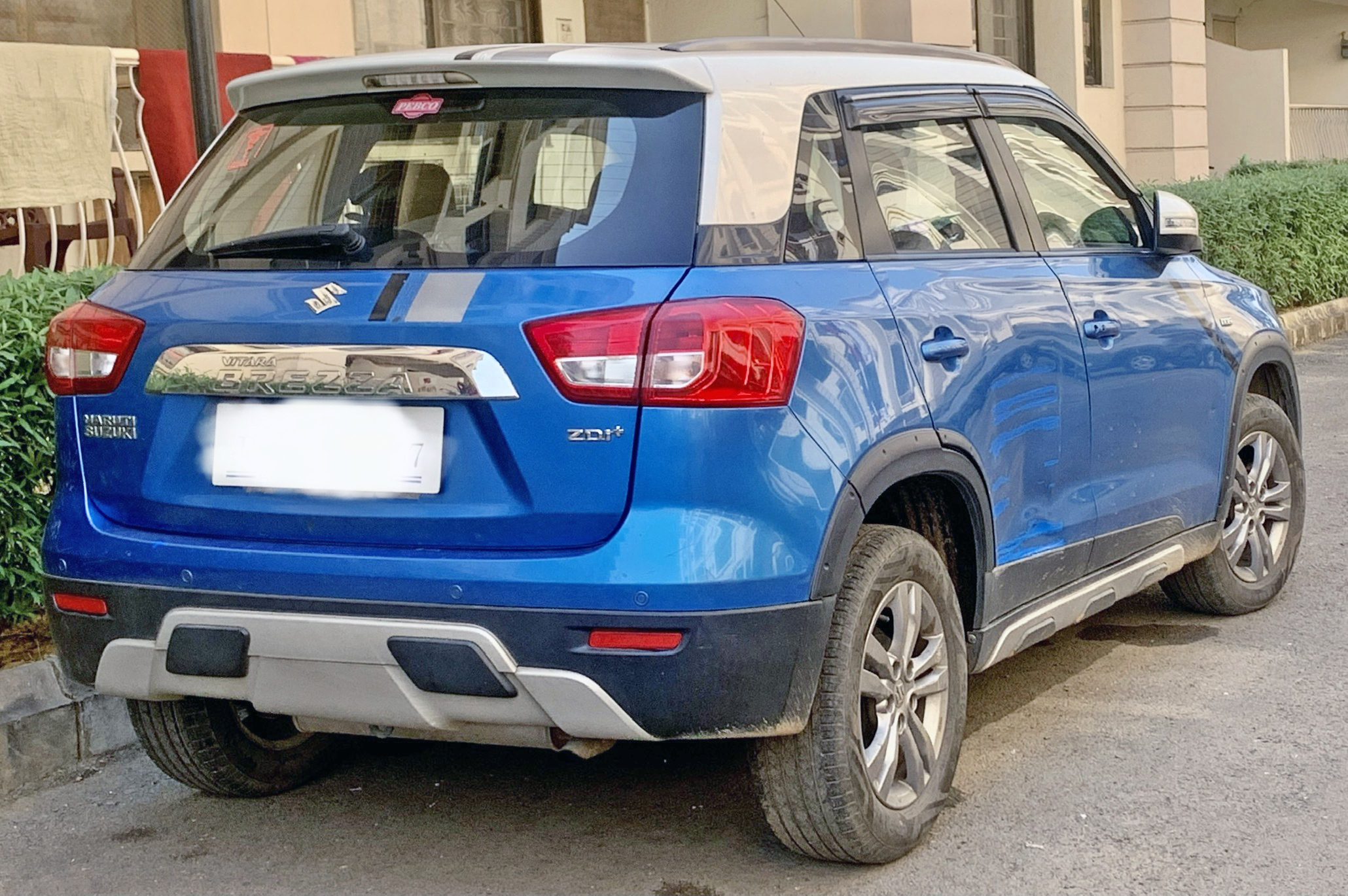
Suzuki Vitara Brezza ZDi+, rear view (pre-facelift)

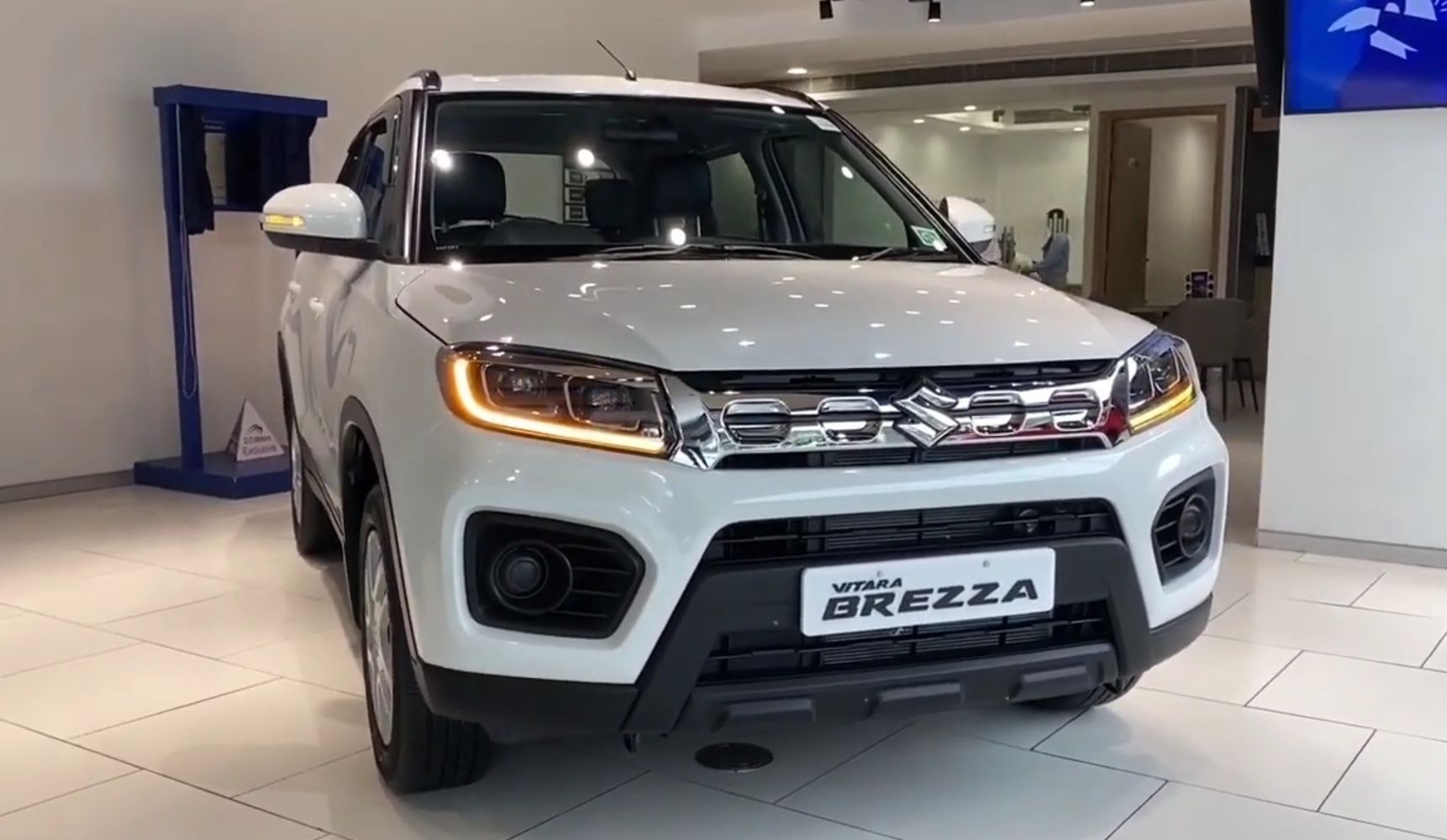
2021 Vitara Brezza VXi (facelift; front)

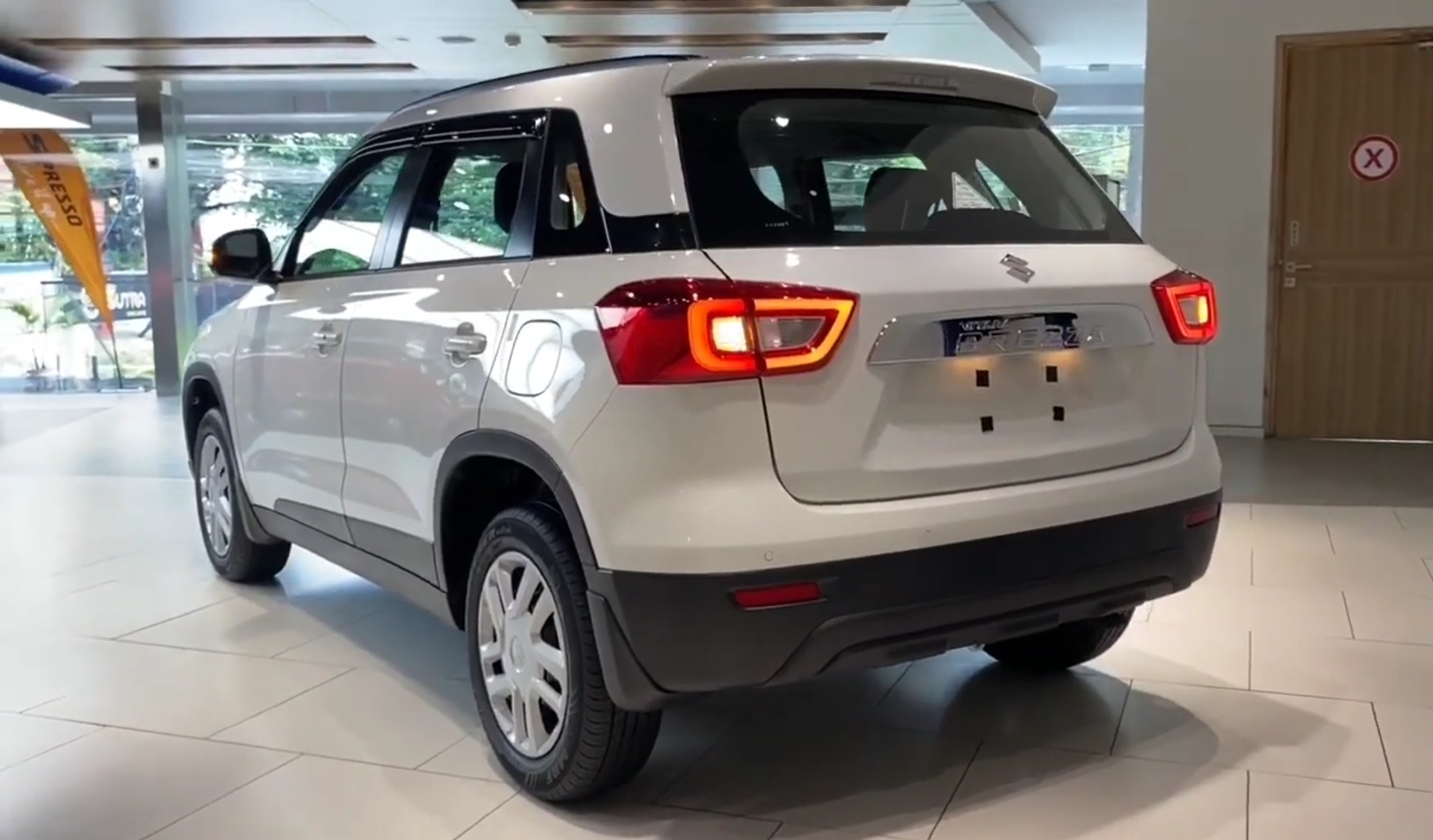
2021 Vitara Brezza VXi (facelift; rear)

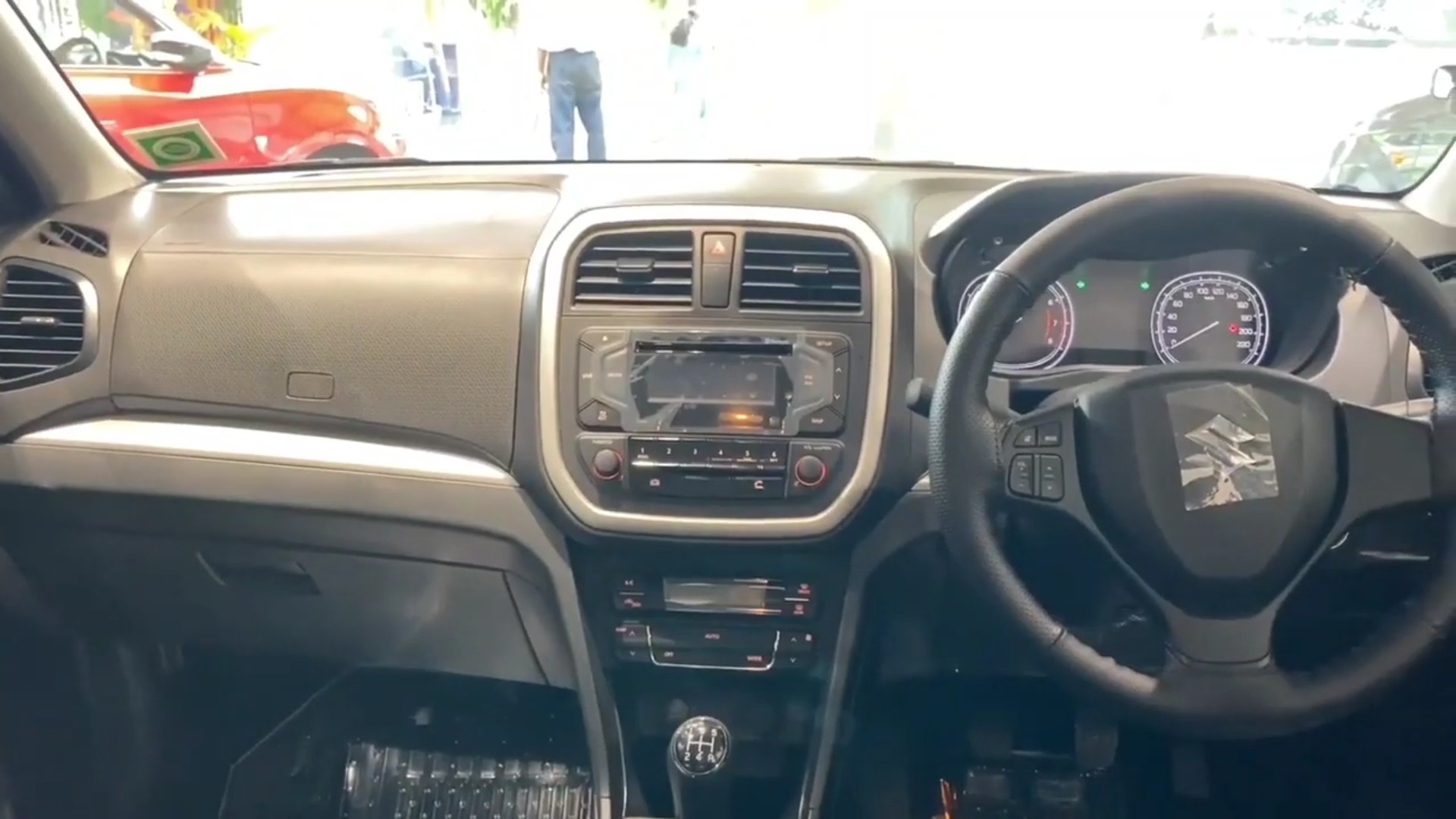
Vitara Brezza VXi Interior (facelift)

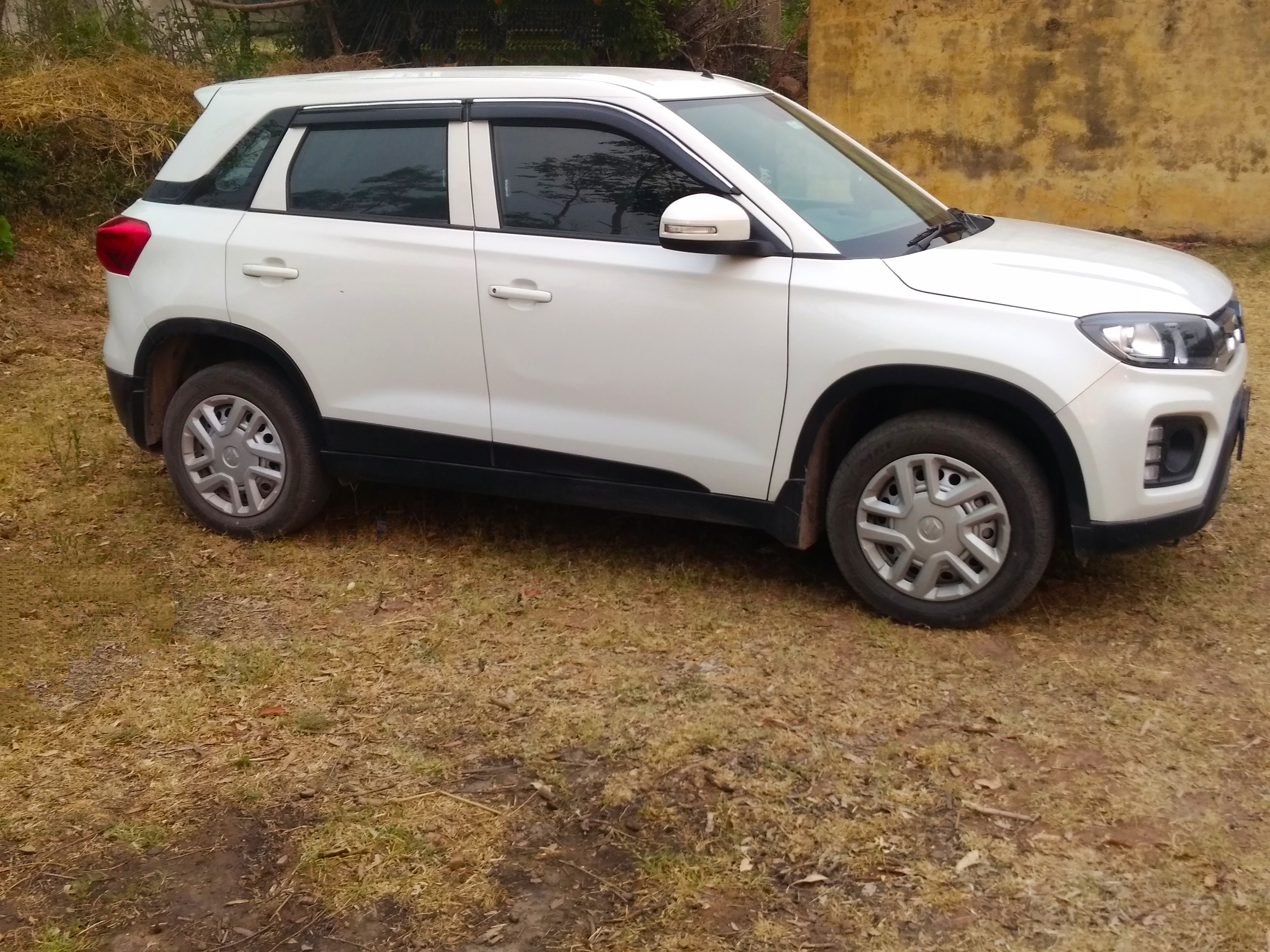
Vitara Brezza LXi (facelift)

=== Toyota Urban Cruiser ===
The facelifted Vitara Brezza is sold by Toyota as the Toyota Urban Cruiser, which debuted in India on 22 August 2020. It received a differentiated front bumper design from the Vitara Brezza. The vehicle was also introduced in South Africa in March 2021. It was discontinued in late 2022 and indirectly replaced by the larger Urban Cruiser Hyryder.

The "Urban Cruiser" nameplate was previously used for the twin version of the Japanese market XP110 series Toyota Ist that was sold in Europe between 2008 and 2014.

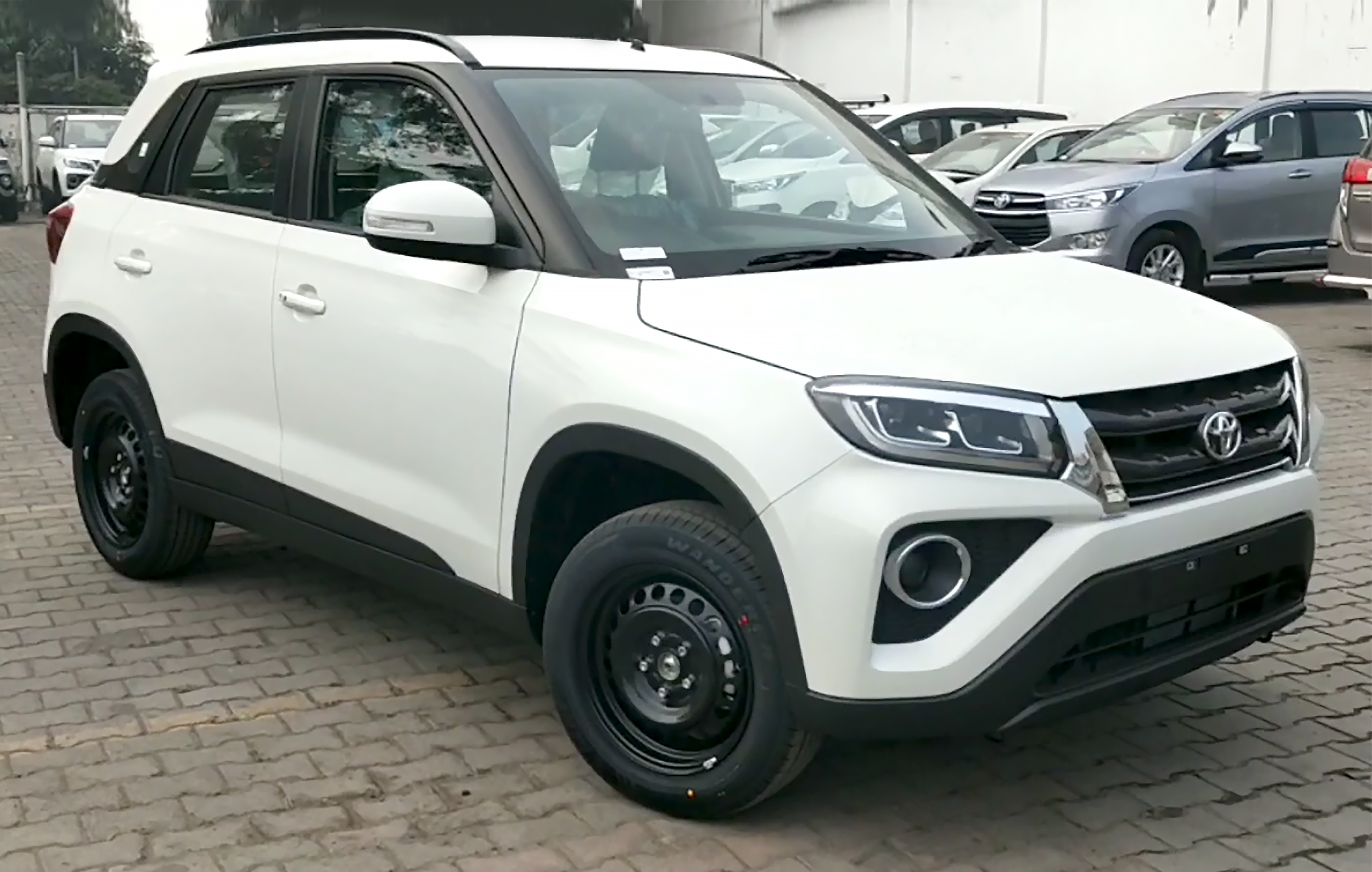
2021 Toyota Urban Cruiser Mid (K15B, India)

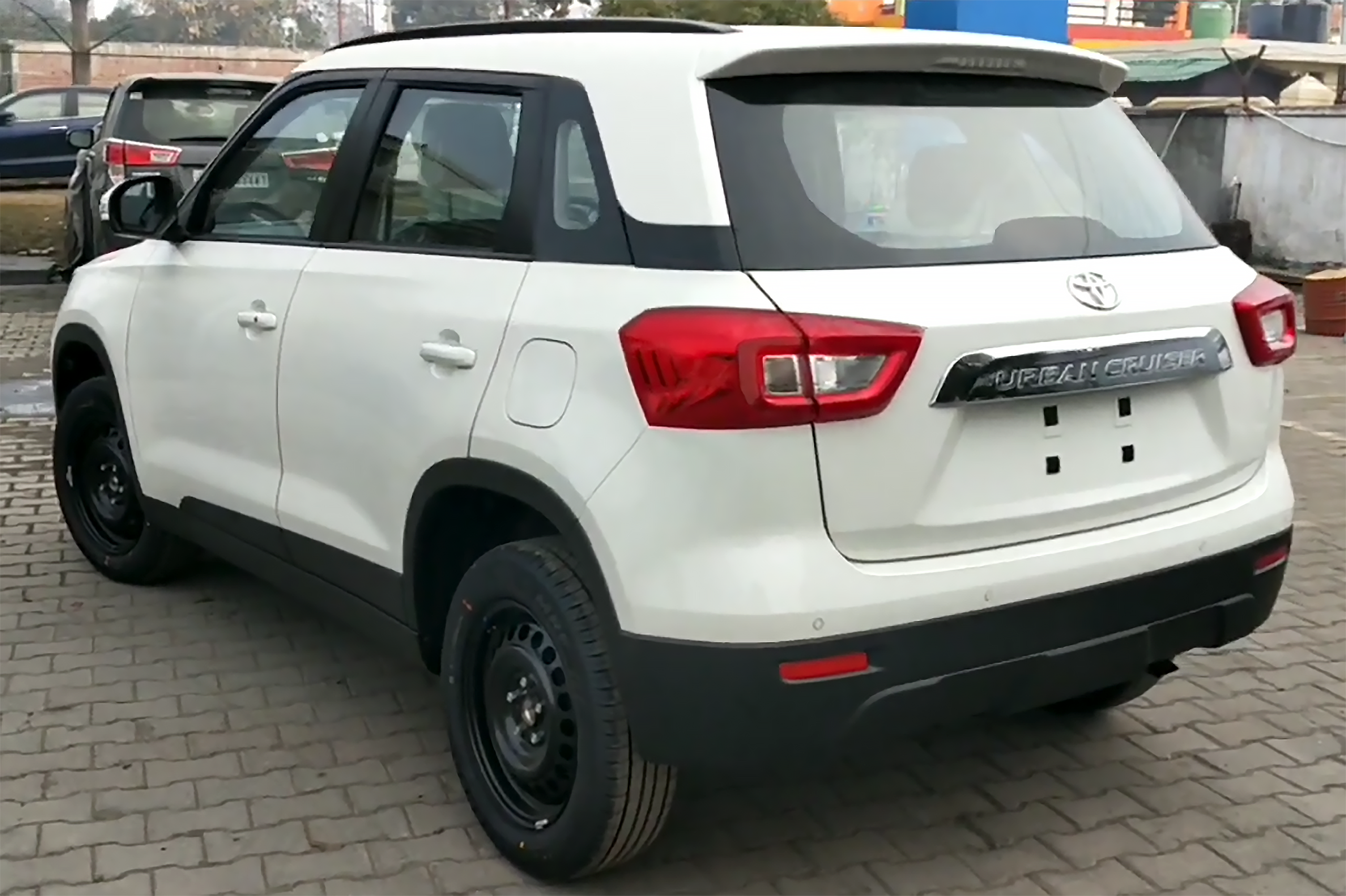
2021 Urban Cruiser Mid (K15B, India)

=== Safety ===
Maruti Suzuki Vitara Brezza

Global NCAP 1.0 test results (India) Maruti Suzuki Vitara Brezza – 2 Airbags (2018, similar to Latin NCAP 2013)
Test	Score	Stars
Adult occupant protection	12.51/17.00	4 /5 stars
Child occupant protection	17.93/49.00	2 /5 stars

Toyota Urban Cruiser

Global NCAP 1.0 test results (India) Toyota Urban Cruiser – 2 Airbags (H1 2022, similar to Latin NCAP 2013)
Test	Score	Stars
Adult occupant protection	13.52/17.00	4 /5 stars
Child occupant protection	36.68/49.00	3 /5 stars

Urban Cruiser's results differed from the Vitara Brezza's due to Toyota's recommendation of a safer position for the Group 0+ children which improved dynamics of the 18 month-old child in the test. The dual seatbelt reminders has been made mandatory in India since July 2019, which partially explained the increase in adult occupant protection score.

== Second generation (YH; 2022) ==
Second generation
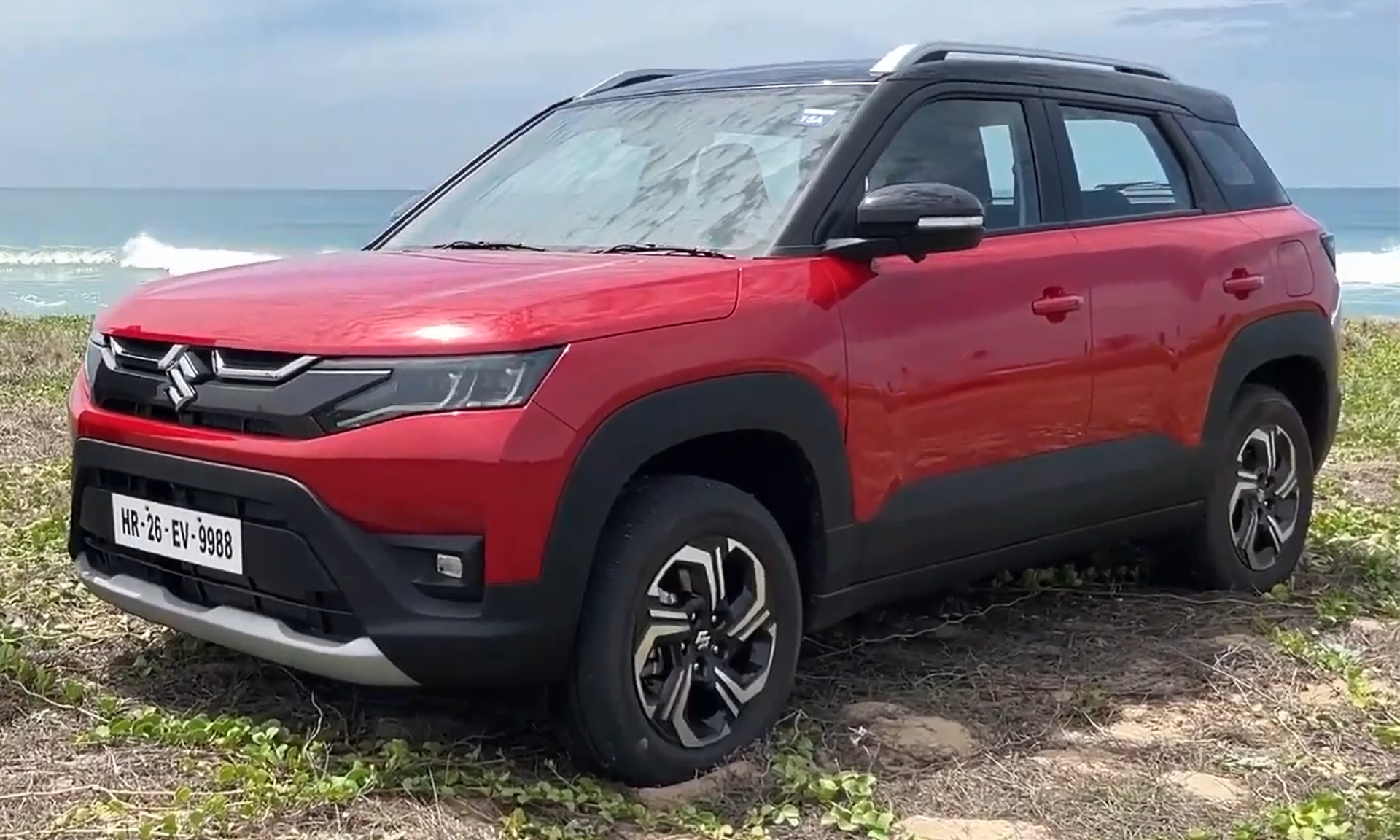
- 2022 Suzuki Brezza ZXi+ (pre-facelift)

Overview
- Model code: YH
- Production: June 2022 – present
- Assembly: India: Gurgaon; Kharkhoda (Maruti Suzuki)

Powertrain
- Engine: Petrol: 1.5 L K15C Dualjet I4 (mild hybrid); 1.0 L K10C Boosterjet turbo I3; CNG: 1.5 L "K15C Dualjet" I4
- Electric motor: 2.2 kW (2.95 hp; 2.99 PS) ISG
- Power output: 75.8 kW (102 hp; 103 PS); 81 kW (109 hp; 110 PS) (turbo)
- Transmission: 5-speed manual; 6-speed manual; 6-speed automatic
- Hybrid drivetrain: 12 V SHVS mild hybrid
- Battery: 6 Ah lithium-ion

Dimensions
- Wheelbase: 2,500 mm (98.4 in)
- Length: 3,995 mm (157.3 in)
- Width: 1,790 mm (70.5 in)
- Height: 1,685 mm (66.3 in)
- Kerb weight: 1,145–1,220 kg (2,524–2,690 lb)

The second-generation Brezza was unveiled in India on 30 June 2022 without the "Vitara" moniker.

The vehicle retained the body shell platform of previous generation with major revisions. It came with revised front and rear fascia, redesigned C-pillar, thicker body claddings, redesigned 16-inch alloy wheels, shark fin-type antenna and electric single-pane sunroof. The dimensions are also nearly identical to the outgoing model, except for the 45 mm (1.8 in) height increase due to the shark fin antenna. On the interior, the dashboard received a layered design with floating 9-inch car audio display, along with redesigned steering wheel (with additional telescopic adjustment) and instrument cluster, wider rear bench seat, and addition of wireless charging dock, interior ambient lighting and rear AC vents. Electronic Stability Program (ESP) and Hill-Start Assist (HSA) are standard across the lineup, with six airbags also standard for all the variant grades.

The engine is replaced by the K15C Dualjet petrol unit with dual injectors, mated to either 5-speed manual or a 6-speed automatic transmission option replacing the old 4-speed unit. The 12 V SHVS mild hybrid system is also carried over.

The second-generation Brezza is not exported from India to international markets such as South Africa. The role of the Brezza there has been filled by the larger Grand Vitara and the Fronx.

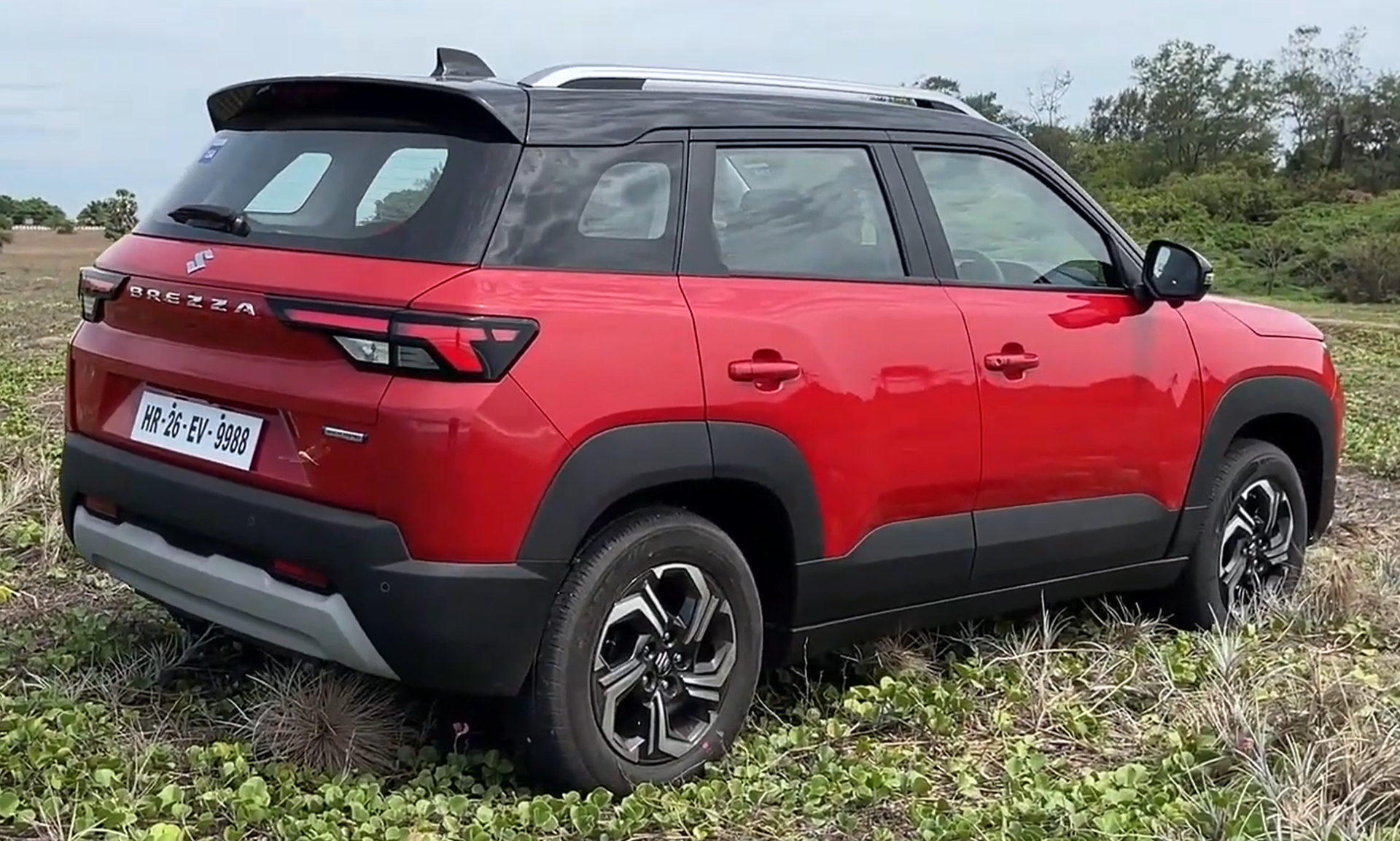
Rear view (pre-facelift)

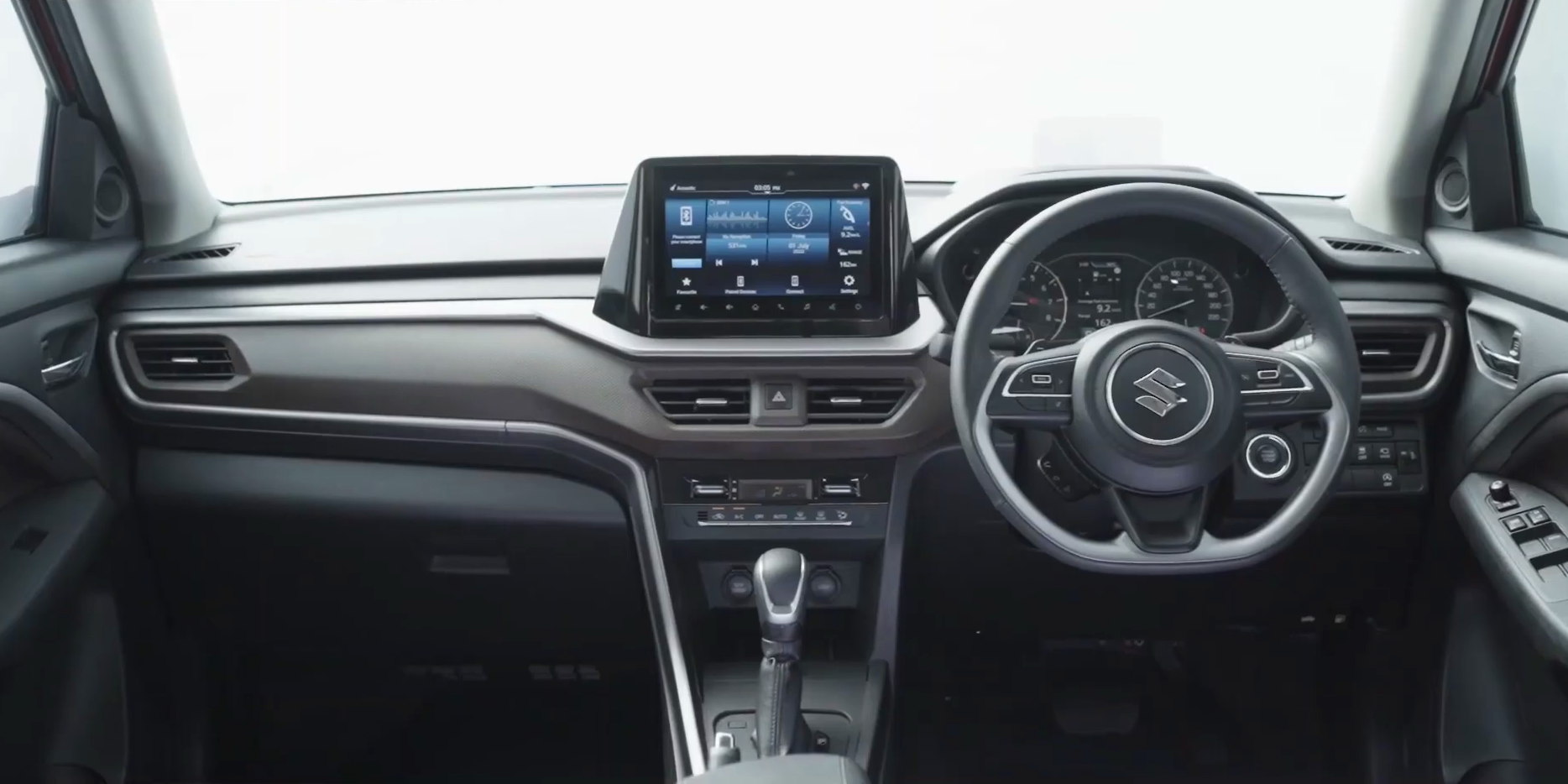
Interior (pre-facelift)

=== Facelift ===
On 24 July 2026, Maruti Suzuki launched the Facelifted version of Brezza with a new 1.0 Turbo BoosterJet Engine producing 109 hp and 170 nm torque. This engine option comes with a 6 speed manual transmission.

=== Safety ===
Bharat NCAP test results Maruti Brezza (2026, based on Latin NCAP 2016)
Test	Score	Stars
Adult occupant protection	30.41/32.00	5 /5 stars
Child occupant protection	43.00/49.00	5 /5 stars

== Awards ==
In 2017, the Vitara Brezza was named as the Indian Car of the Year.

== Sales ==
Year	India		South Africa	
Year	Vitara Brezza	Urban Cruiser	Vitara Brezza	Urban Cruiser
2016	85,168			
2017	140,945			
2018	155,466			
2019	131,732			
2020	83,666	7,600		
2021	115,962	27,015	3,809	8,887
2022	130,563	30,214	7,425	16,992
2023	170,588	—		
2024	188,160	—		
2025	175,310	—		
