= Brilliance V3 =

Subcompact crossover produced by Brilliance Auto

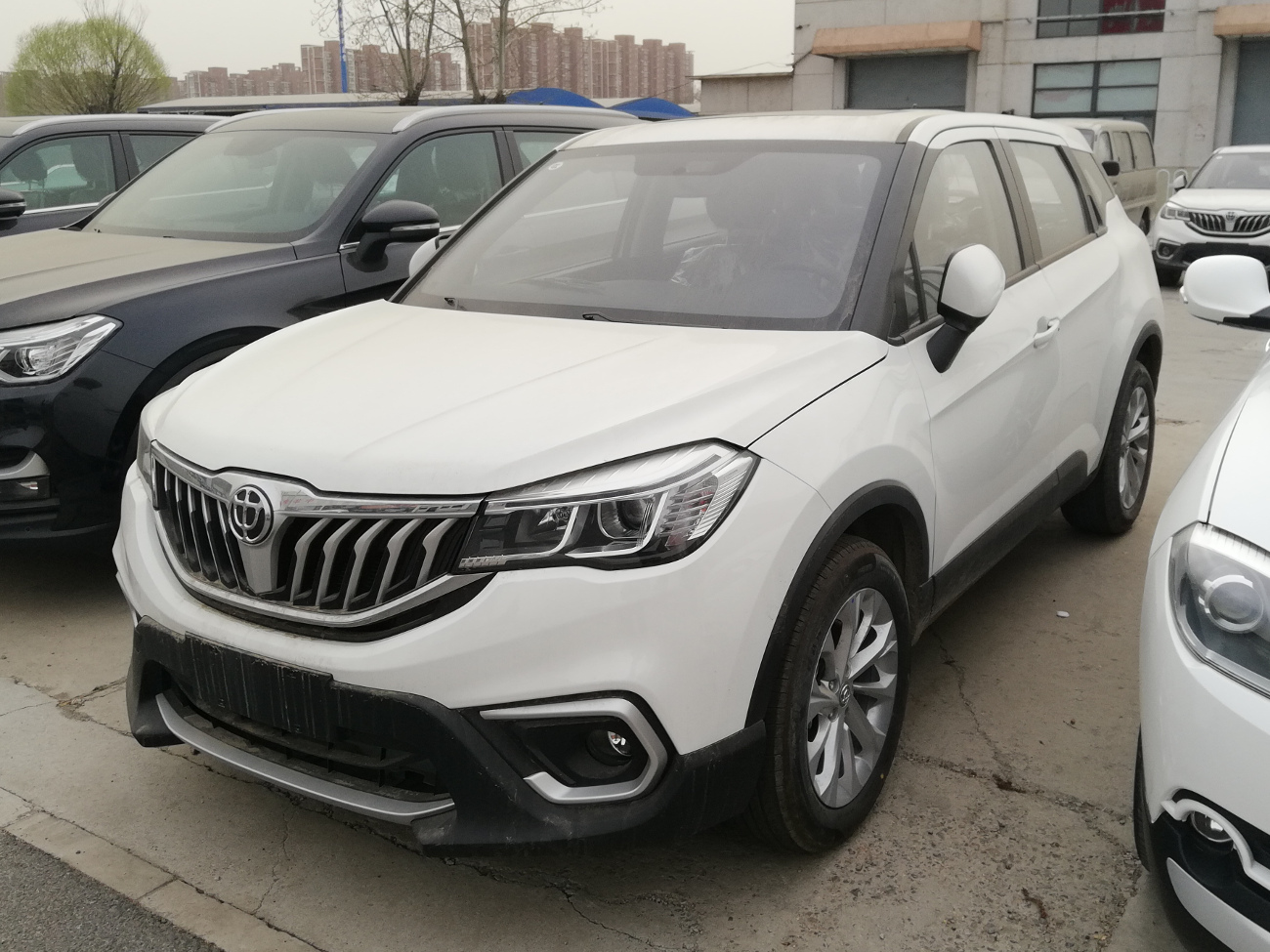

Overview
- Production: 2014–2020
- Model years: 2015–2020

Body and chassis
- Class: subcompact CUV (B-segment)
- Body style: 5-door crossover
- Layout: Front-engine, front-wheel-drive
- Related: Brilliance H220

Powertrain
- Engine: 1.5 L I4; 1.5 L turbo I4
- Transmission: 5-speed manual 5-speed automatic

Dimensions
- Wheelbase: 2,570 mm (101.2 in)
- Length: 4,240 mm (166.9 in)
- Width: 1,803 mm (71.0 in)
- Height: 1,600 mm (63.0 in)

The Brilliance V3 is a subcompact SUV produced by Brilliance Auto under the Zhonghua brand. The V3 crossover shares the same platform with the Brilliance H220, and It debuted on the 2015 Shanghai Auto Show and was launched in the Chinese market in May 2015 and has been the best-selling Brilliance ever since. Prices starts from 67,500 yuan to 117,700 yuan.

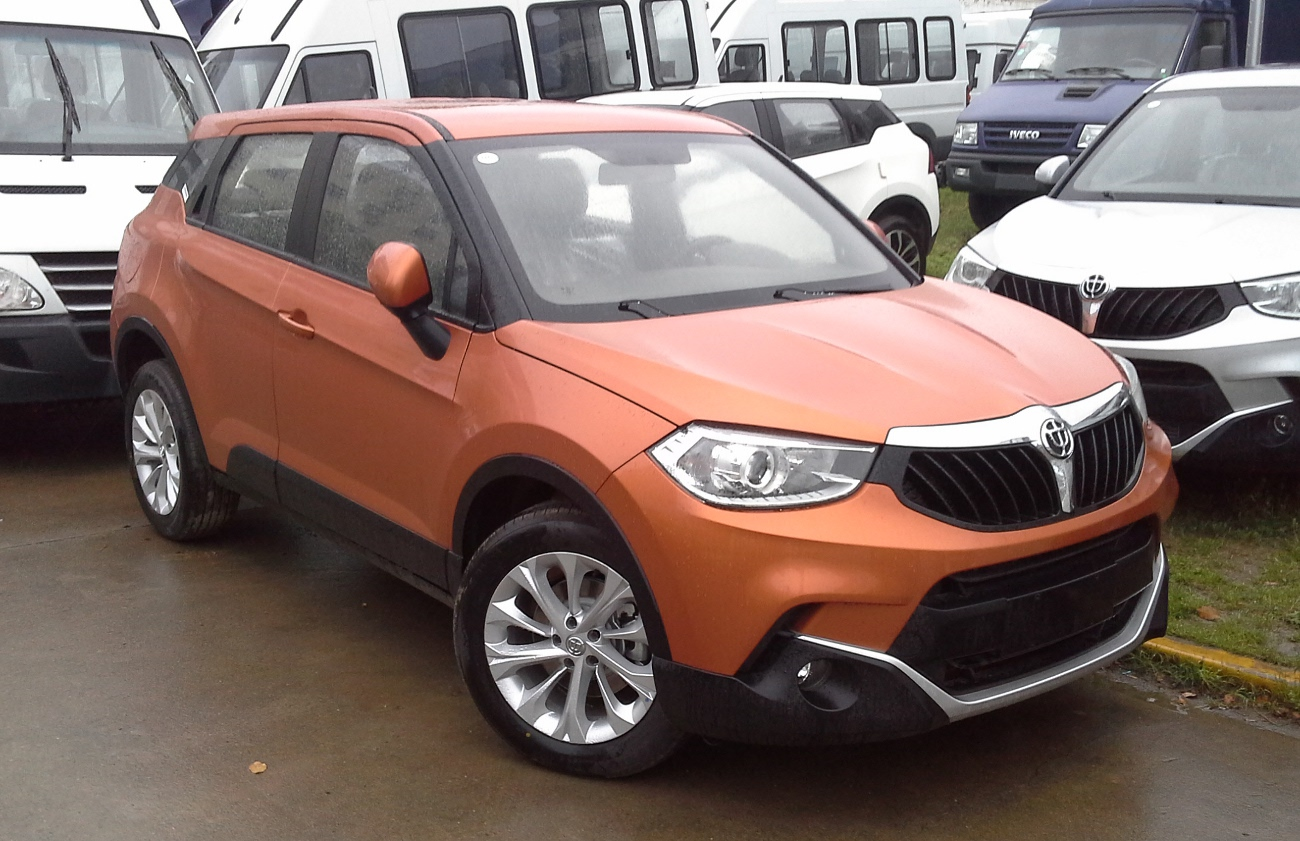
Brilliance V3 pre-facelift front

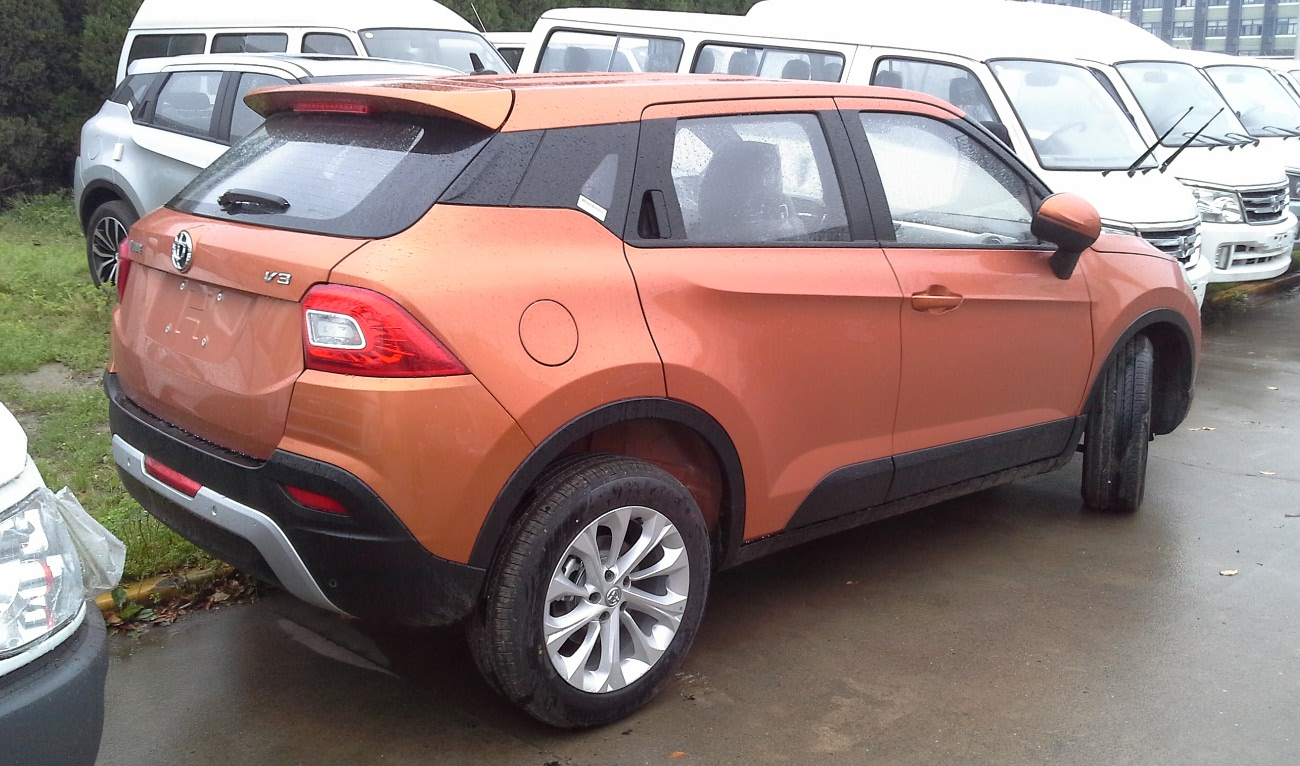
Brilliance V3 pre-facelift rear

== 2017 facelift ==
The facelifted V3 was launched on the Chinese auto market in Q2 2017. The facelift mainly updates the front DRG to be in line with other Brilliance Zhonghua crossover products with the chrome grilles and headlamps connecting with each other, and on the rear, the most obvious styling updates are the redesigned L-shaped tail lamps. With the pre-facelift 112 hp 1.5L and a 150 hp 1.5L turbo engines to continue in the facelifted car.

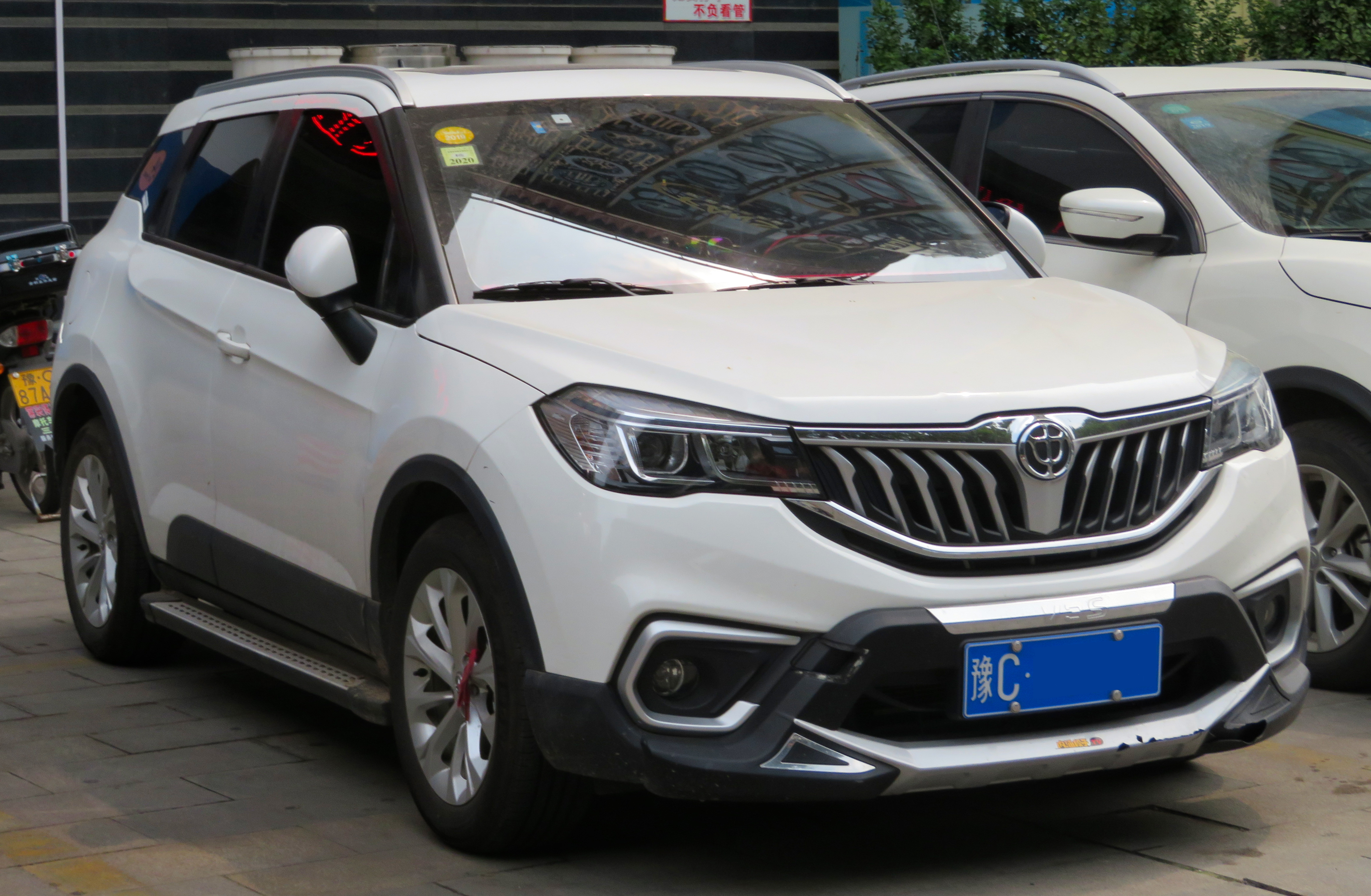
Brilliance V3 post-facelift

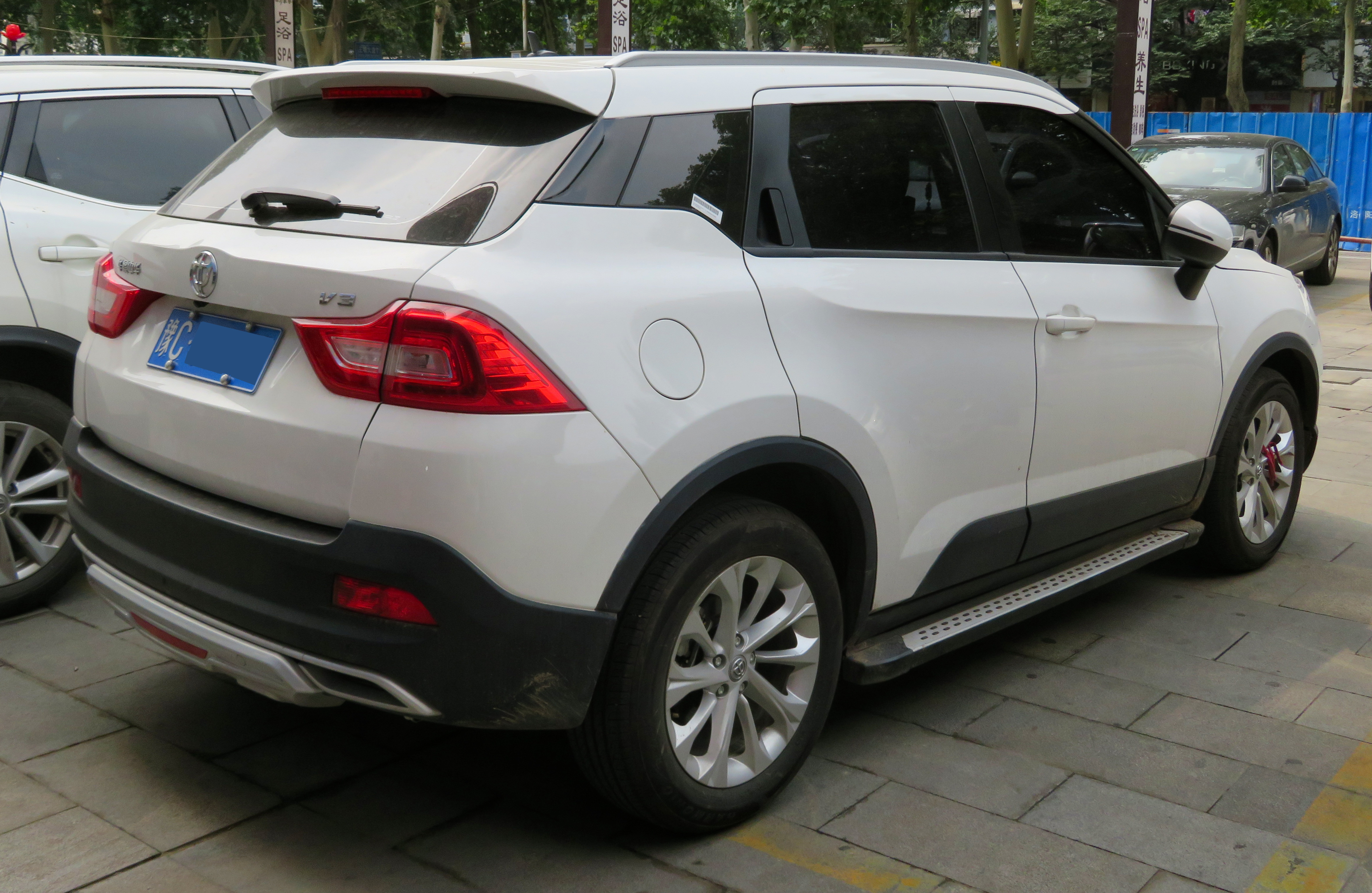
Rear view

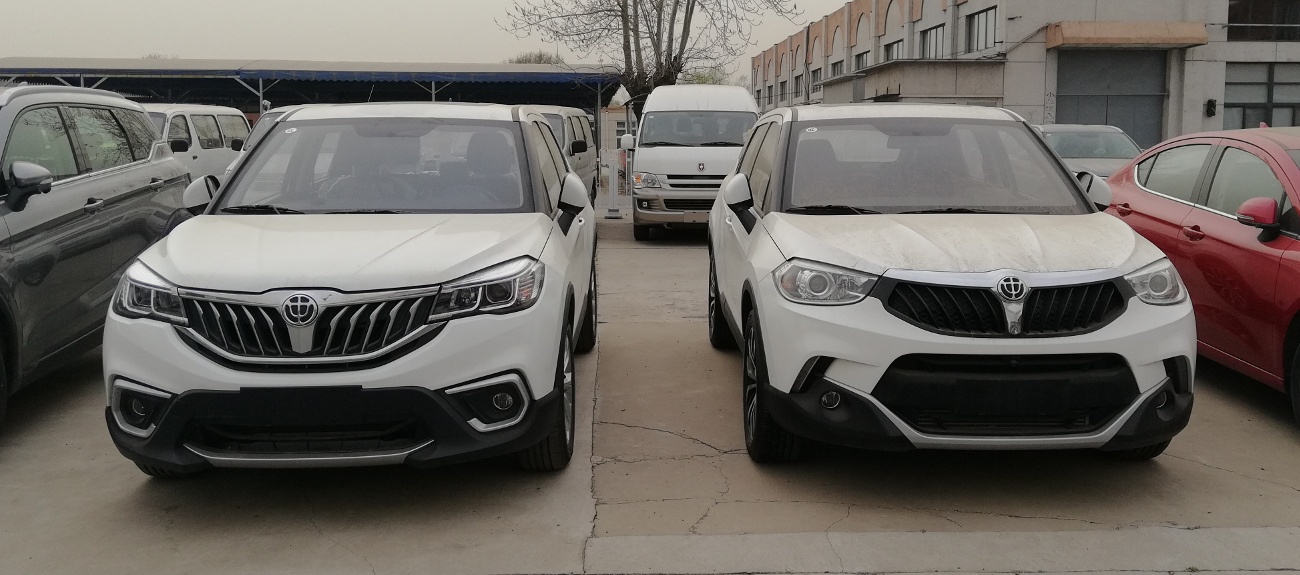
Post-facelift (right) next to pre-facelift (left)
