= Hongqi E-HS3 =

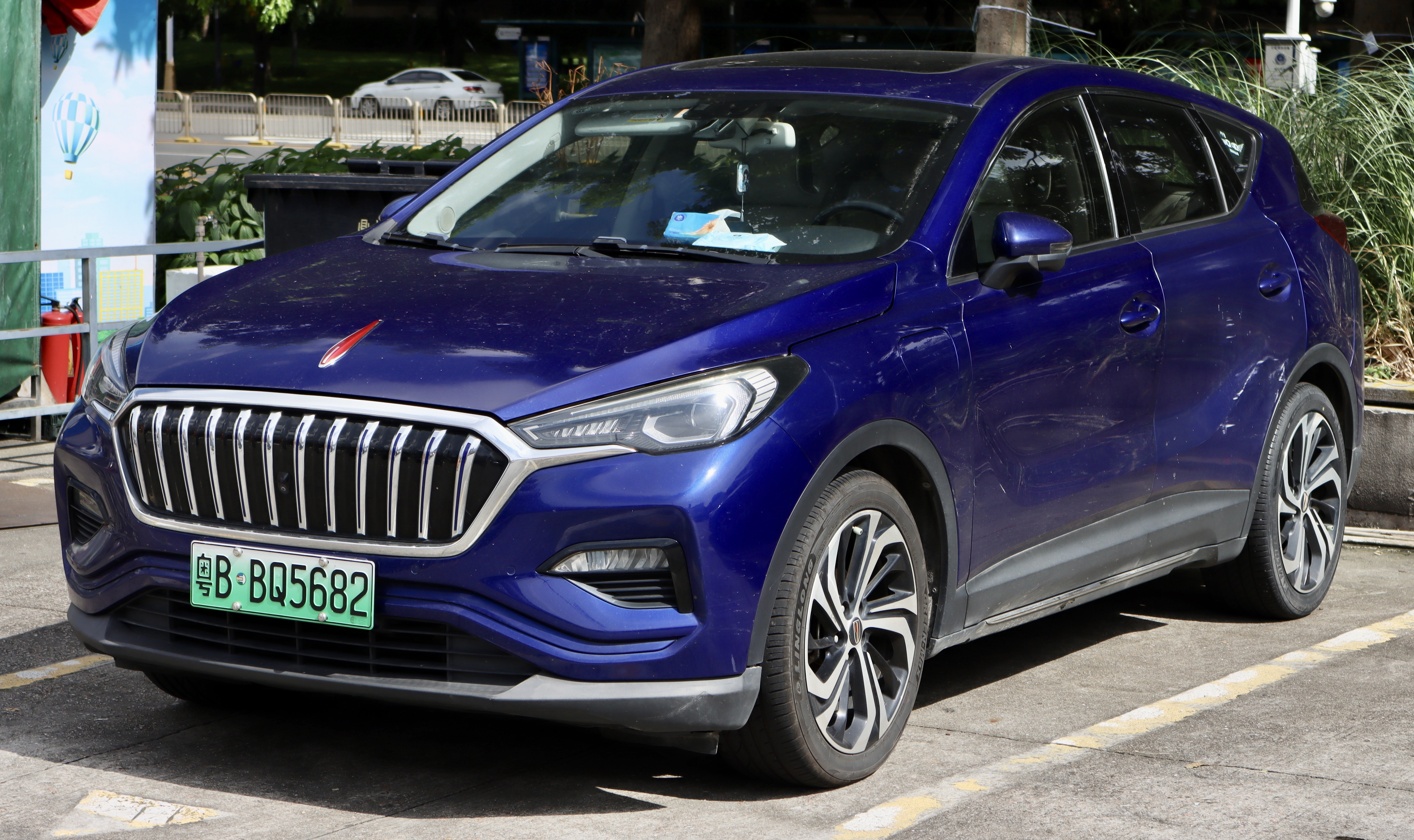

Overview
- Manufacturer: Hongqi (FAW Group)
- Production: 2018–2023
- Assembly: China: Changchun, Jilin
- Designer: Vojtěch Stránský

Body and chassis
- Class: Subcompact luxury crossover SUV
- Body style: 5-door SUV
- Layout: Front-motor, front-wheel drive; Dual-motors all-wheel drive

Powertrain
- Electric motor: Permanent magnet synchronous
- Power output: 114–228 kW (153–306 hp; 155–310 PS)
- Battery: 52.5 kWh lithium-ion battery

Dimensions
- Wheelbase: 2,875 mm (113.2 in)
- Length: 4,490 mm (176.8 in)
- Width: 1,874 mm (73.8 in)
- Height: 1,613 mm (63.5 in)
- Curb weight: 1,890 kg (4,167 lb)

Chronology
- Successor: Hongqi HS3

The Hongqi E-HS3 is a battery electric subcompact luxury crossover SUV produced by Chinese automobile manufacturer Hongqi, a subsidiary of FAW Group.

== Overview ==
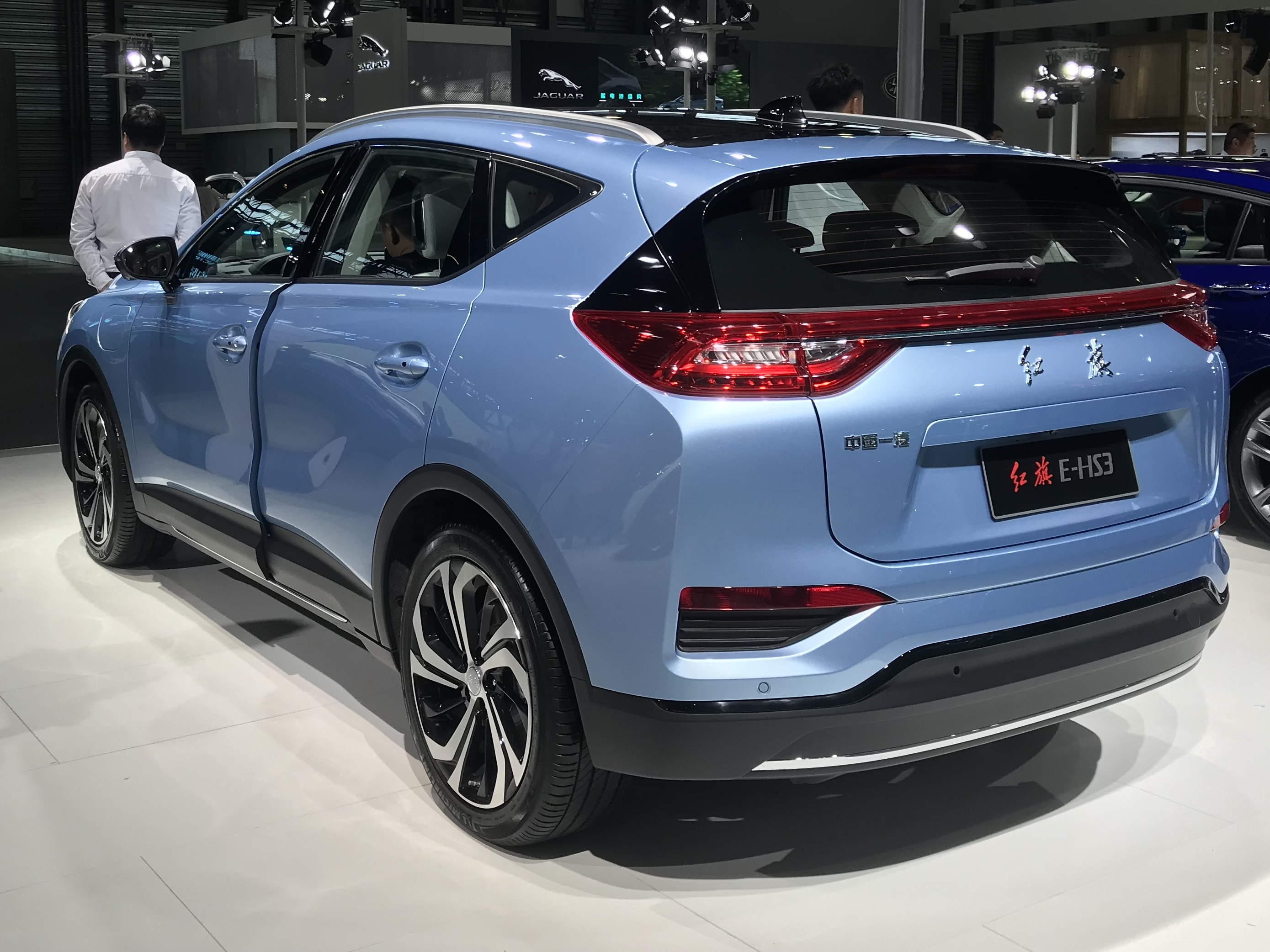
Hongqi E-HS3 rear

The original Hongqi E-HS3 was launched in 2018 as a battery electric subcompact SUV. Previewed by a pre-production concept during the 2018 Beijing Auto Show, there are two versions of the powertrain, the FWD version with a single152 hp electric motor and an AWD version with dual-motor which reaches 304 hp power output combined.

== Sales ==
Year	China
2023	126
2024	30
