= Hongqi HS3 =

Subcompact luxury crossover SUV

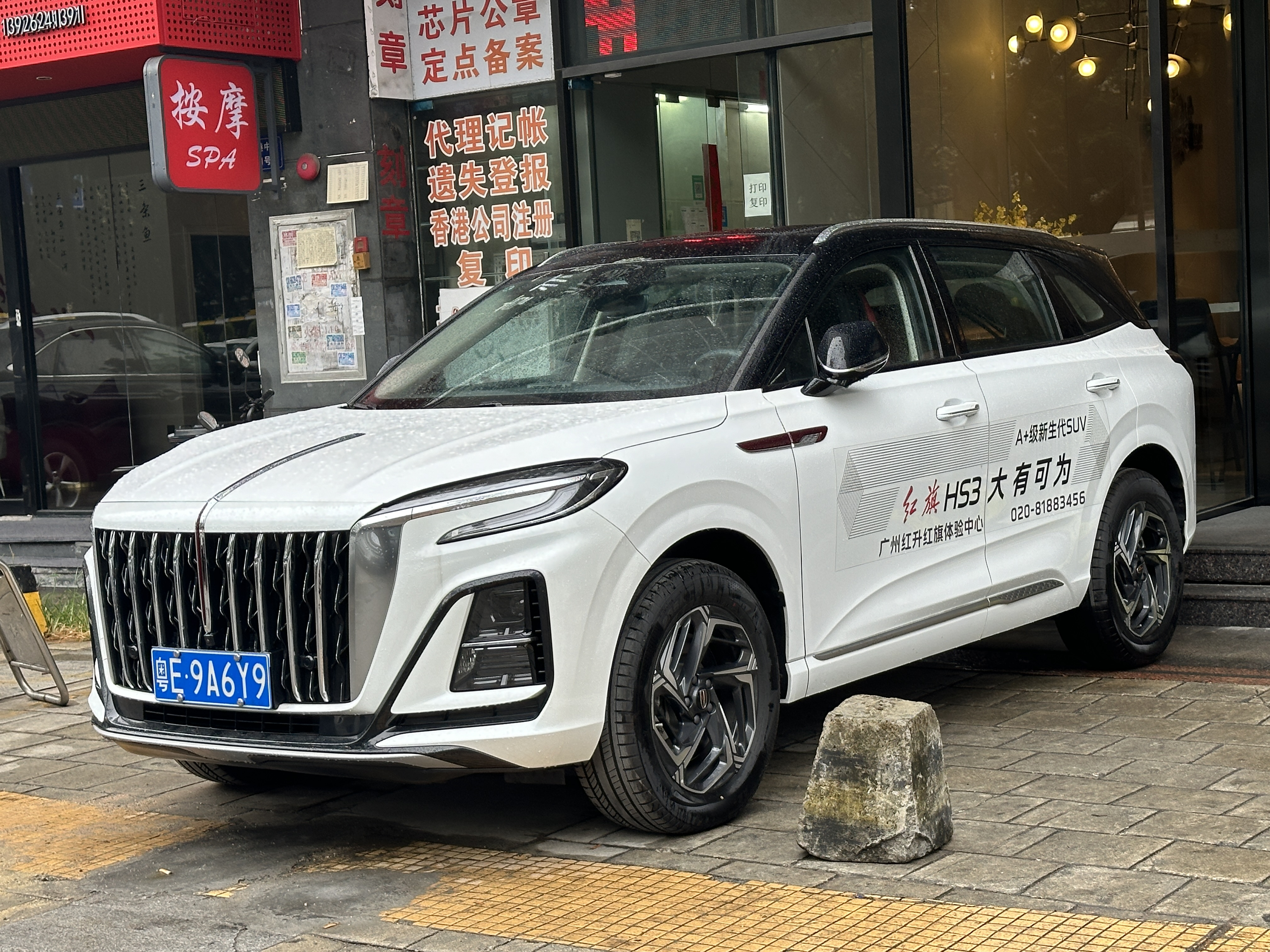

Overview
- Manufacturer: Hongqi (FAW Group)
- Also called: IKCO Safir R7 (Iran)
- Production: 2023–present
- Assembly: China: Changchun, Jilin; Iran: Binalud, Razavi Khorasan (IKCO)

Body and chassis
- Class: Subcompact luxury crossover SUV
- Body style: 5-door SUV
- Layout: Front-engine, front-wheel-drive layout; Front-engine, all-wheel drive

Powertrain
- Engine: Petrol: 1.5 L I4 turbo; 2.0 L I4 turbo
- Transmission: 8-speed automatic

Dimensions
- Wheelbase: 2,770 mm (109.1 in)
- Length: 4,655 mm (183.3 in)
- Width: 1,900 mm (74.8 in)
- Height: 1,668 mm (65.7 in)
- Curb weight: 1,710 kg (3,770 lb)

Chronology
- Predecessor: Hongqi E-HS3

The Hongqi HS3 is a subcompact luxury crossover SUV produced by Chinese automobile manufacturer Hongqi, a subsidiary of FAW Group.

== Overview ==
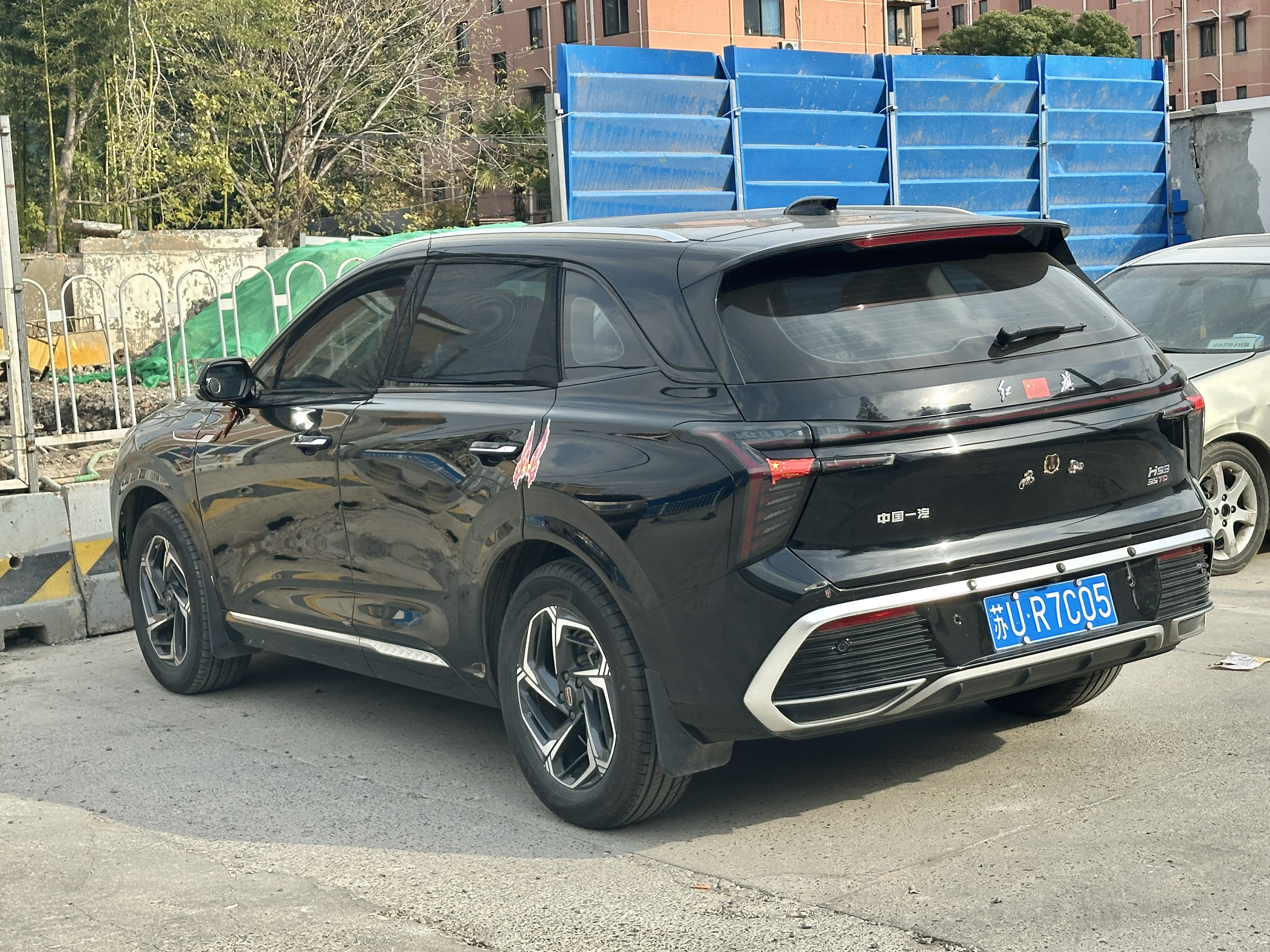
Rear view

The petrol-powered updated Hongqi entry level crossover SUV called the HS3 was unveiled during 2023 Shanghai Auto Show. The HS3 is powered by a 1.5-liter turbocharged inline-4 engine producing 168 hp with front wheel drive as the entry model, or a 2.0-liter turbocharged inline-4 engine producing 252 hp with either the front or all wheel drive options. The transmission is an 8-speed automatic gearbox.

== Markets ==
=== UAE ===
The HS3 comes with a 7-year warranty and is offered in Luxury and Flagship trims.

Prices range from AED 100,000 to AED 122,999.

== Sales ==
Year	China		
Year	HS3	PHEV	Total
2023	15,508	—	15,508
2024	30,522	6,180	36,702
2025	14,218	31,893	46,111
