= Subcompact crossover SUV =

Smallest sport utility vehicle class

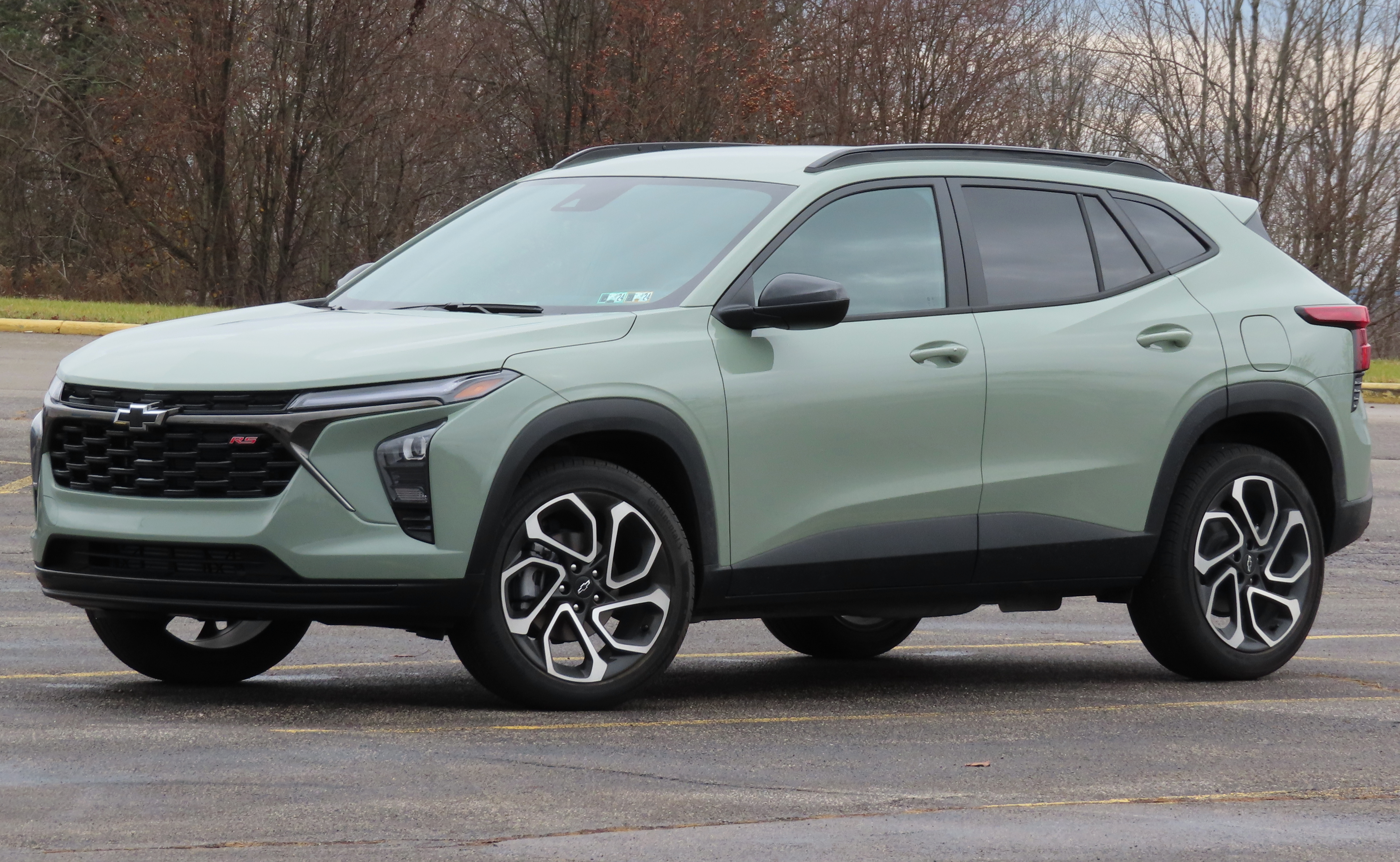
The Chevrolet Trax was the best-selling subcompact crossover SUV in the U.S. in 2025.

Subcompact crossover SUV is an automobile segment used to describe the smallest segment of crossover SUV, a type of sport utility vehicle, below the compact crossover SUV. Subcompact crossover SUVs are usually based on a platform of a subcompact (also known as supermini or B-segment) passenger car, although some high-end subcompact crossover models are based on a compact car (C-segment). The segment started to gain traction during early to mid-2010s when the number of models and sales figures rapidly increased in major markets such as North America and Europe. In 2019, around 22 percent of SUV global sales were contributed by subcompact crossovers.

The segment is particularly popular in Europe, India, and Brazil where they account for 37 percent, 75 percent, and 69 percent of total SUV sales in 2018 respectively. In 2019, the best selling subcompact crossover was the Honda HR-V, recording 622,154 units being sold worldwide.

== Terminology ==
The "subcompact crossover SUV" or "subcompact crossover" term is most commonly used in North America, where the "subcompact" and "crossover" terms originated from.

The segment is also known as "B-segment SUV", "B-SUV", "small SUV", or "subcompact CUV". It is also known with several other terms depending on the market, including "compact crossover" or "compact SUV", which differs with the more common definition of a compact crossover SUV, which is a class larger and belongs to the C-segment. Classification of a certain model may also vary between markets due to differences in regional definitions, competition and pricing.

== Characteristics ==
Subcompact crossovers commonly use the same platform of similarly-sized subcompact/B-segment hatchbacks or sedans, while some high-end models may be based on a compact cars (C-segment). Crossovers in this segment typically have limited off-road capabilities with the majority adopting front-wheel-drive layout, although many subcompact crossovers offer all-wheel-drive. Depending on the market and the manufacturer, subcompact crossover SUVs typically have an exterior length under 4,400 mm (173.2 in).

According to IHS Markit, vehicles from this segment were considered by customers as cheap to purchase and run, offer a "desirable lifestyle styling" and higher seating position. Other advantages also include higher ground clearance, convenient ingress/egress, larger headroom, and larger legroom space compared to B-segment/subcompact hatchbacks.

Despite built on the same platforms as subcompact cars and using much of the same technology, customers are shown to be willing to purchase them with a higher price. A study by JATO Dynamics showed that average price of subcompact SUVs sold in 2021 in the European market was €26,366, compared with €20,699 for subcompact or small cars.

== History ==
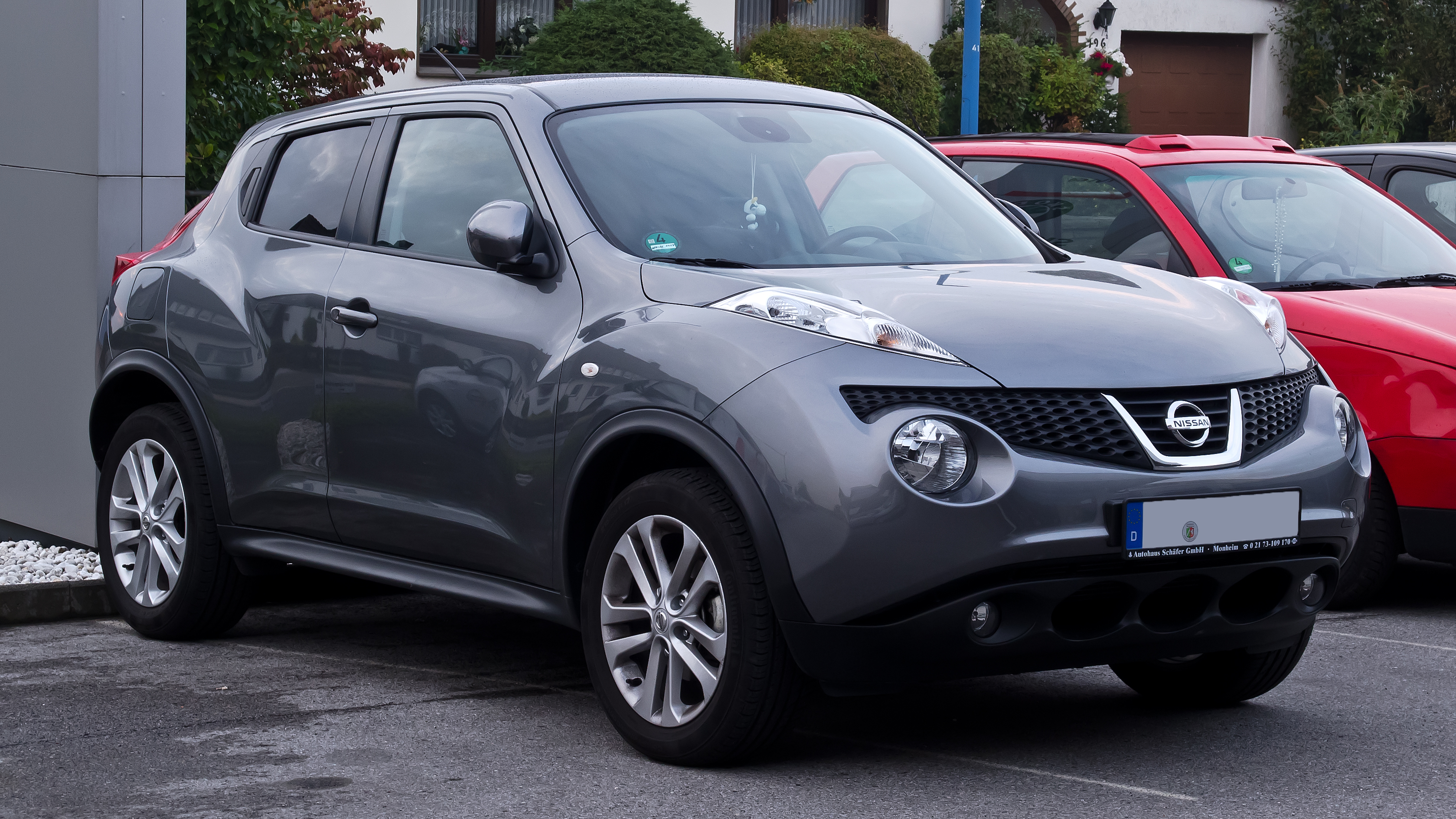
Despite its exterior styling criticism, the Nissan Juke was argued to have started the wave of subcompact crossovers.

The first-generation Honda HR-V, released in 1998 mainly for the Japanese and European markets, is considered to be one of the first subcompact crossovers. Its exterior length was between 4–4.11 m (157.5–161.8 in), sold with either 3-doors and 5-doors, and was offered with an all-wheel-drive option. However, the release of the Nissan Juke in 2010, oriented towards Europe and North America, was argued to have helped define and start the development of the almost non-existent segment at the time.

From the mid-2010s onwards, manufacturers began to phase out subcompact hatchbacks and sedans in favor of subcompact crossovers in several markets due to higher profit margins as the result of the increasing popularity of the segment, particularly in North America.

Due to its expanding market share, it is common in this segment for one brand to offer more than one model at different price points and segmentation. For example, as of 2022, Volkswagen offered three models in the segment in Europe, which are T-Roc, T-Cross, and Taigo.

== Criticism ==
According to 2020 tests conducted in the UK by Which?, vehicles from this class returned an average of around 7 percent worse fuel economy and 7 percent higher CO_{2} tailpipe emissions than equivalent hatchbacks such as the Ford Fiesta and Renault Clio, and was said to be marginally less efficient than the medium hatchback class such as the Volkswagen Golf.

== Markets ==
=== United States ===
Subcompact SUVs sales (2025)
Model	Sales
Chevrolet Trax	206,339
Subaru Crosstrek	191,724
Honda HR-V	148,771
Nissan Kicks	103,575
Chevrolet Trailblazer	101,363
Toyota Corolla Cross	99,798
Hyundai Kona	74,814
Buick Envista	58,949
Buick Encore GX	57,528
Kia Seltos	56,798
Mazda CX-30	57,528
Volkswagen Taos	55,198
Kia Soul	50,133

In the North American market where larger vehicles are preferred, the segment has been largely marketed to urban drivers and consumers looking to downsize to a smaller, more efficient vehicle. While not as popular as the larger compact crossovers, the segment has experienced major growth in the U.S. market in its brief history.

The Nissan Juke, which was unveiled at the 2010 New York International Auto Show to be sold for the 2011 model year was considered the first model in the segment, apart from the luxury Mini Countryman. Many other nameplates in the segment appeared between 2013 and 2015, which included the Buick Encore, Chevrolet Trax, Fiat 500X, Ford EcoSport, Honda HR-V, Jeep Renegade, and Subaru Crosstrek.

In 2015, there were 10 subcompact crossover nameplates in the U.S., totalling 411,774 units sold or 2.4 percent of the overall market. In that year, subcompact crossovers outsold subcompact cars for the first time in history. In the following year, the Jeep Renegade was the first in the segment to cross the 100,000-sales threshold.

In 2018, the segment consisted of 16 nameplates and recorded 784,073 sales, capturing 12 percent of the U.S. crossover market and 4.5 percent of overall U.S. automobile market, according to the Automotive News Data Center. In comparison, the share of subcompact cars fell to 2.4 percent of the U.S. market in 2018 from 5.4 percent in 2010, while compact cars declined to 9.9 percent from 12.4 percent in the same period.

In 2019, the Hyundai Kona became the first subcompact crossover SUV to win the North American Utility Vehicle of the Year. Around 50 percent of subcompact crossover SUVs sold in the U.S. in 2021 were produced in South Korea.

Top 3 best-sellers in the U.S., 2025

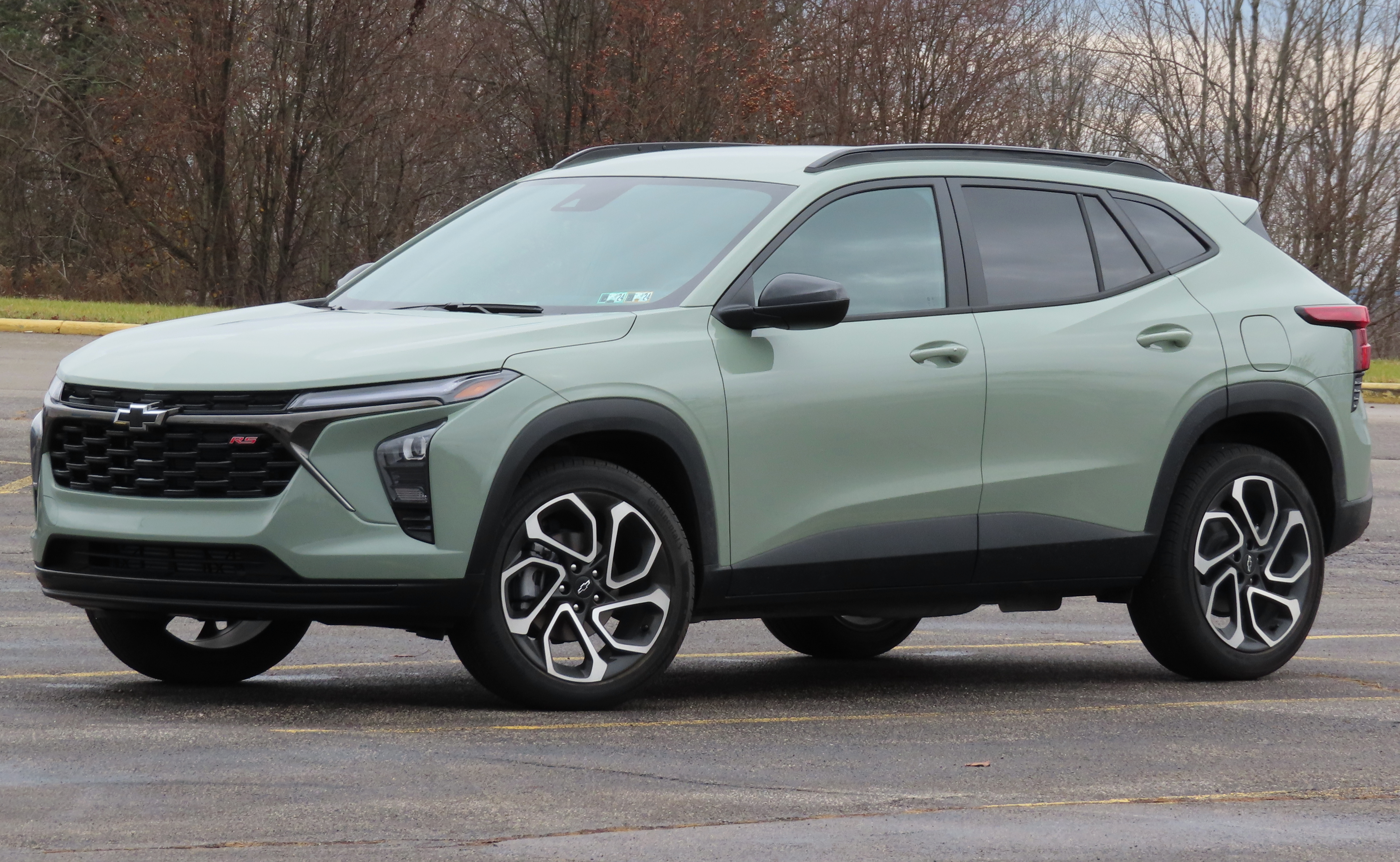
Chevrolet Trax
(206,339 sold)

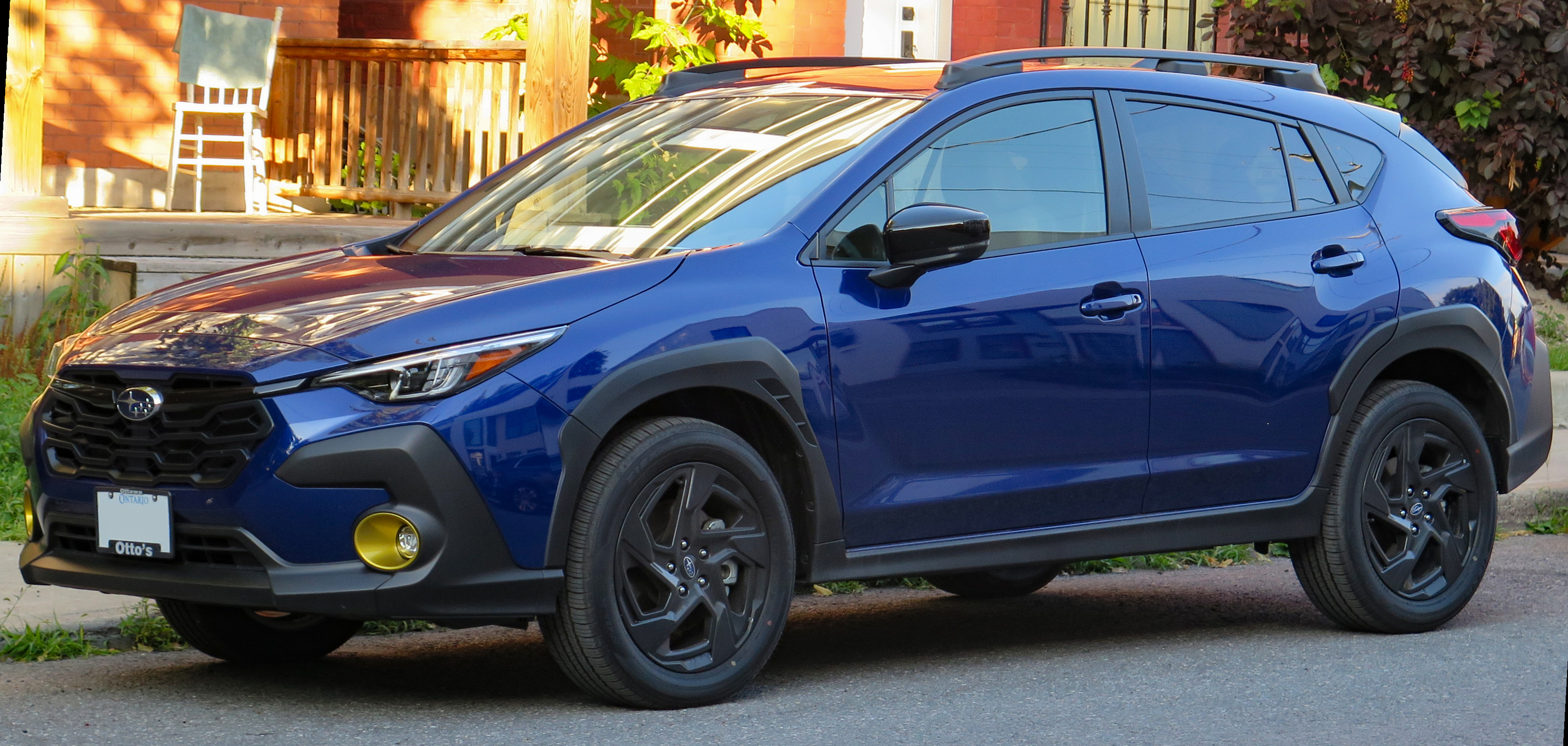
Subaru Crosstrek
(191,724 sold)

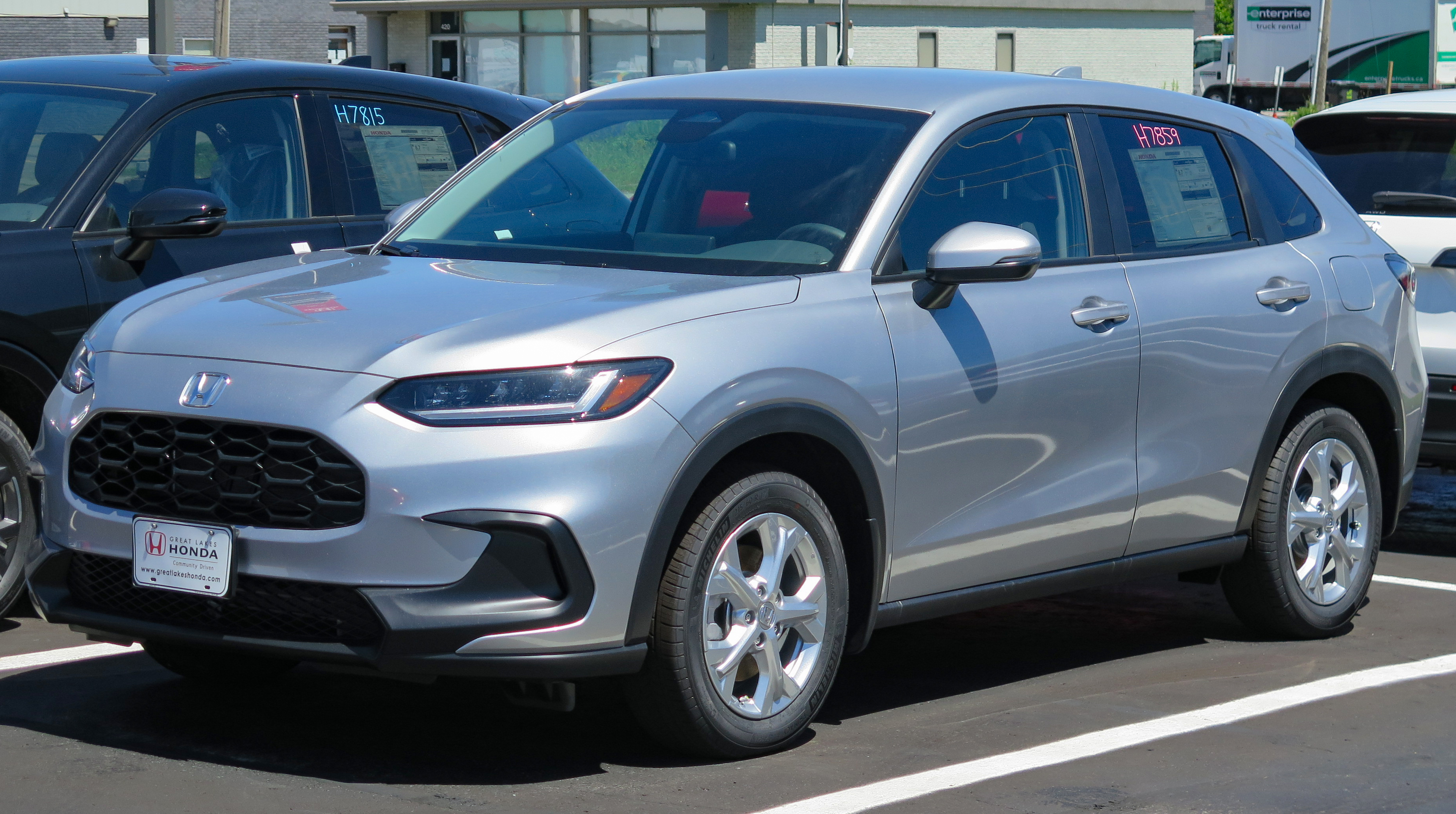
Honda HR-V
(148,771 sold)

=== Europe ===
European figures for B-segment SUV (including off-roaders) had rapidly increased during the 2010s. Between 2000 and 2009, sales volume only doubled 60,000 units in 2000 to 125,000 units according to JATO Dynamics. However, IHS Markit noted that sales of the segment in Europe between 2010 and 2016 increased nearly tenfold from 134,000 units to 1.13 million units. Industry analyst LMC Automotive predicts sales will reach 2.3 million in 2023 and will steadily rise to reach almost 3 million by 2028.

In 2010, Nissan introduced the Juke which was produced in the UK and Japan. Many other nameplates entered the market between 2012 and 2013, which included the Dacia Duster, Chevrolet Trax, Ford EcoSport, Opel Mokka, Peugeot 2008, Suzuki SX4 S-Cross, and Renault Captur.

Volkswagen entered the segment in 2017 with the release of the Volkswagen T-Roc, positioned below the Tiguan. Other models such as the Citroën C3 Aircross, SEAT Arona and Hyundai Kona further boosted growth in 2017. In that year, B-SUV accounted for 10 percent of the overall automobile market.

Several manufacturers have changed their product mix by introducing subcompact crossovers to replace mini MPVs in Europe due to the popularity of the former and the declining sales of the latter. Models from the segment was seen a fit replacement for mini MPVs. The examples are the Citroën C3 Aircross which replaced the Citroën C3 Picasso and Opel Crossland X replacing the Opel Meriva.

According to data from JATO Dynamics, sales in 2021 totalled 2,018,791 units, representing 37 percent of the SUV market and 17 percent of the overall automobile market. Petrol-powered vehicles dominated the segment with 72 percent of sales in the first 10 months of 2021, followed by diesel at 14 percent. Full-electric models accounted for 5.1 percent of sales in the same period. According to JATO's data for Europe, seven European car brands that focused their efforts on developing SUVs, have seen their overall sales in the B and C segments fall dramatically between 2001 and 2021.

According to data from JATO Dynamics, sales in 2024 totalled 2,460,000 units, representing 36 percent of the SUV market and 19,1 percent of the overall automobile market.

Top 3 best-sellers in Europe, 2025

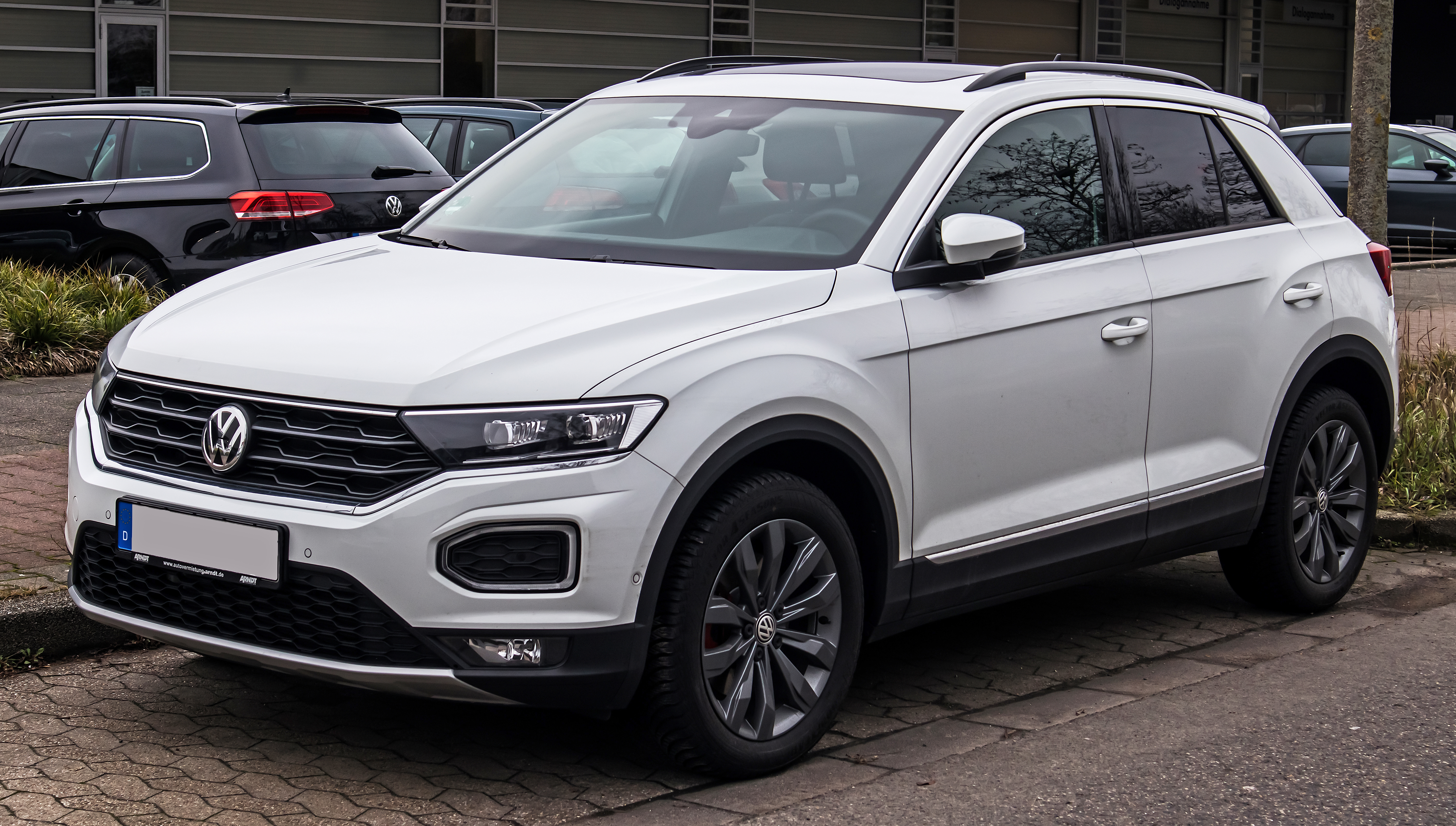
Volkswagen T-Roc
(211,241 sold)

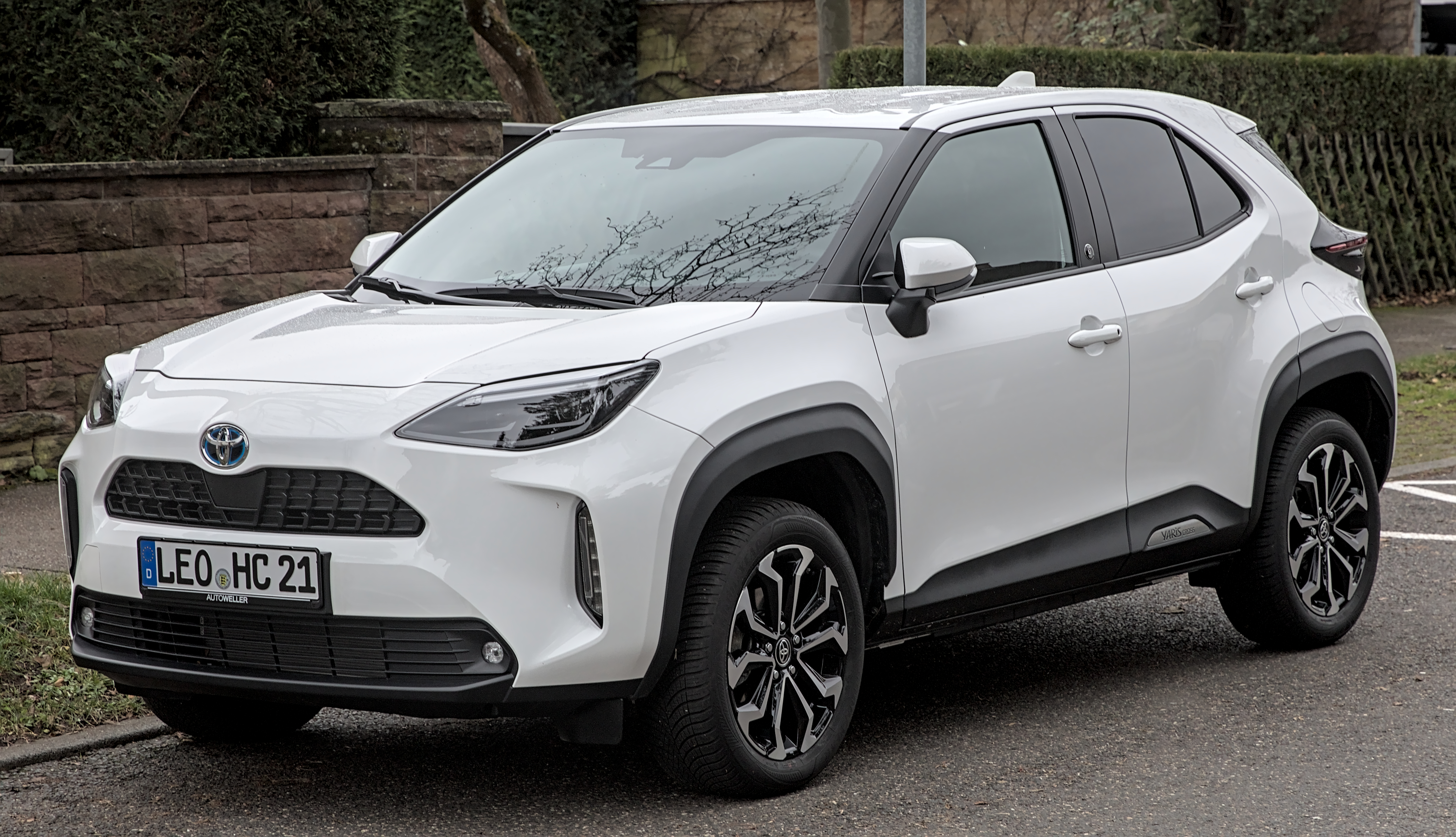
Toyota Yaris Cross
(190,565 sold)

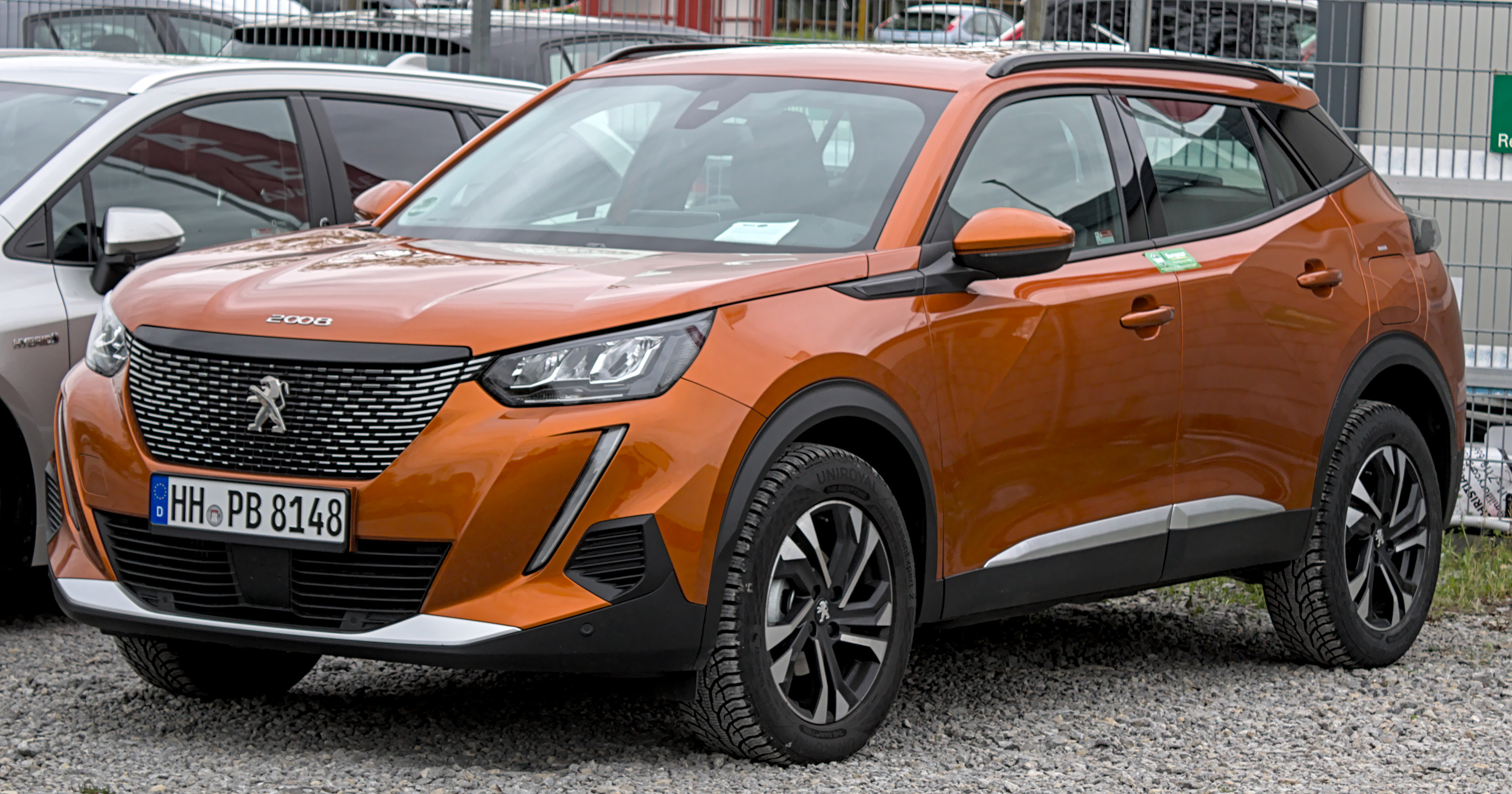
Peugeot 2008
(171,438 sold)

=== India ===
In India, subcompact crossovers with a length dimension below 4 m (157.5 in) are commonly called "subcompact SUVs" or "compact SUVs" by journalists, and the larger ones are usually referred as "mid-size SUV". The distinction was due to the Indian vehicle dimensions regulations which imposes heavier tax for vehicles longer than 4 m (157.5 in).

Renault entered the segment in 2012 when company saw a gap in the SUV market in India, which was filled by the Duster. The vehicle has proven to be a sales success in its initial release as its major competitors was from a segment above and a segment below. Major growth of the B-SUV class continued in between 2015 and 2016, when the Hyundai Creta (introduced in 2015) and Maruti Suzuki Vitara Brezza (2016) was introduced to the market. Sales of B-SUVs increased 509 percent in January–May 2016 compared to the same period in 2015, while it gained 7.2 percent of overall market share.

The first mainstream sub-4 metre SUV to be launched in India was the Ford EcoSport (in 2012) which was a high-selling model due to the lack of competition, followed by the Maruti Suzuki Vitara Brezza. Soon after, many other manufacturers followed suit, with 10 models available in the sub-segment as of 2021.

Top 3 best-sellers in India, 2025

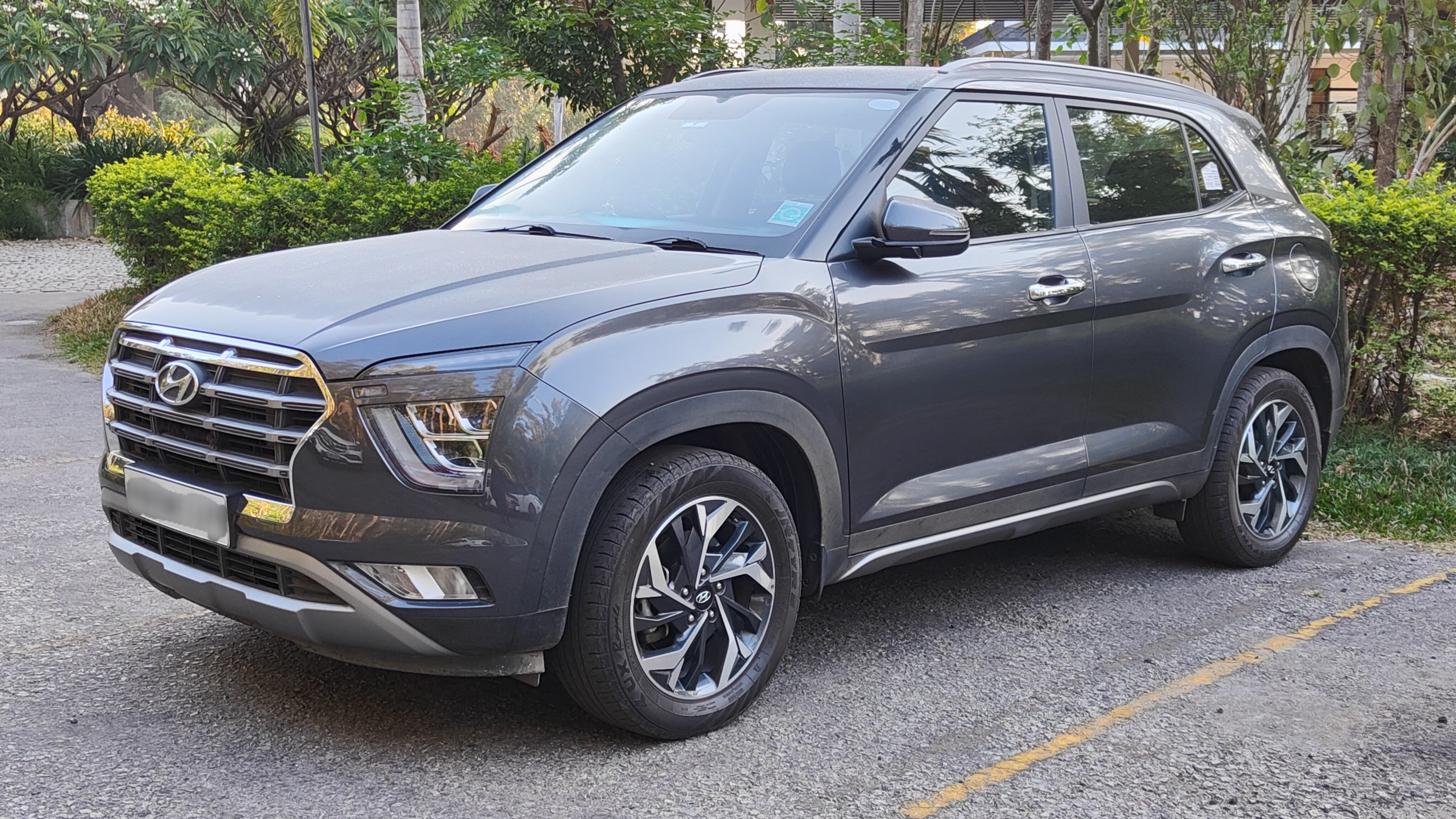
Hyundai Creta
(201,122 sold)

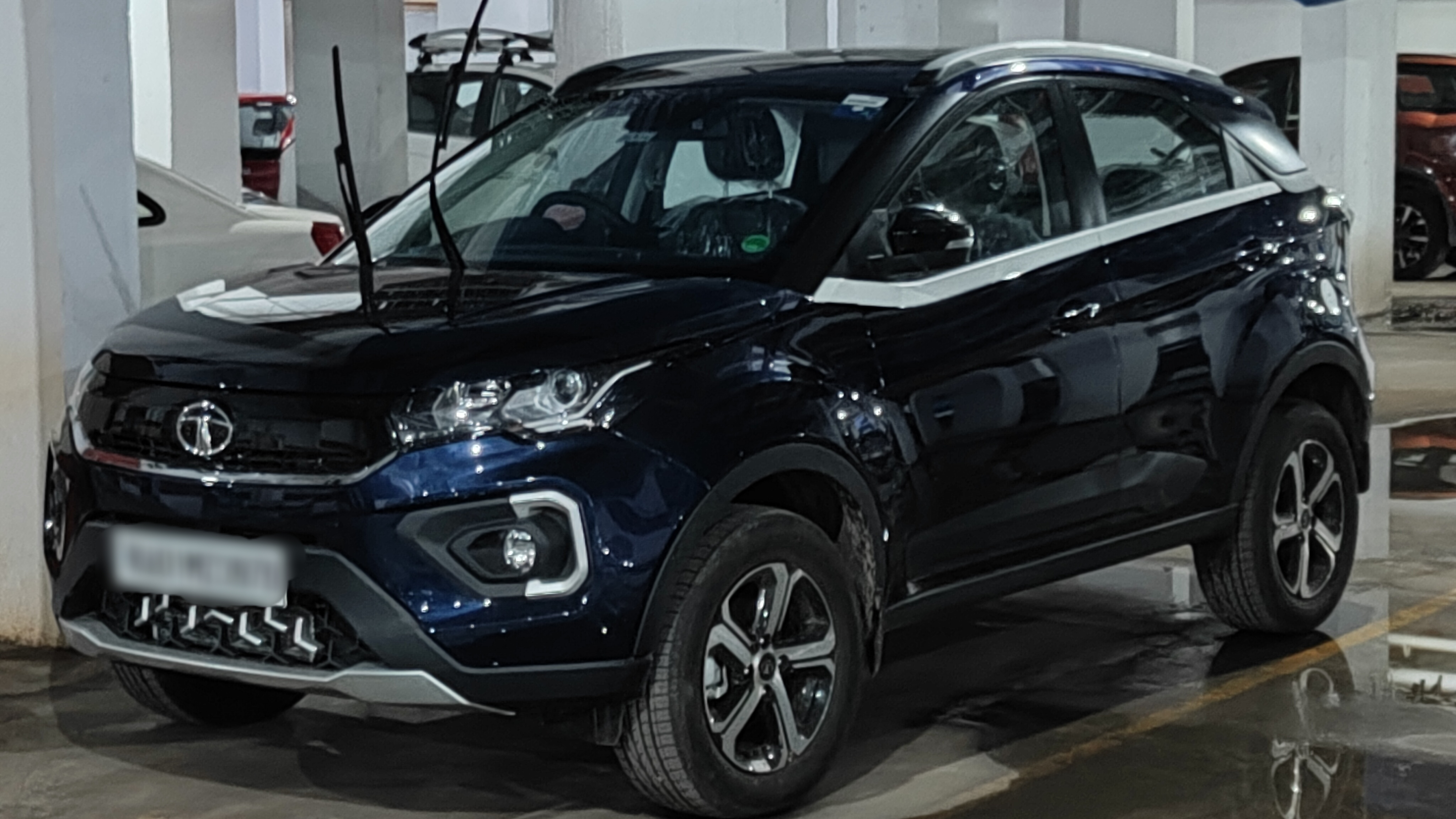
Tata Nexon
(200,561 sold)

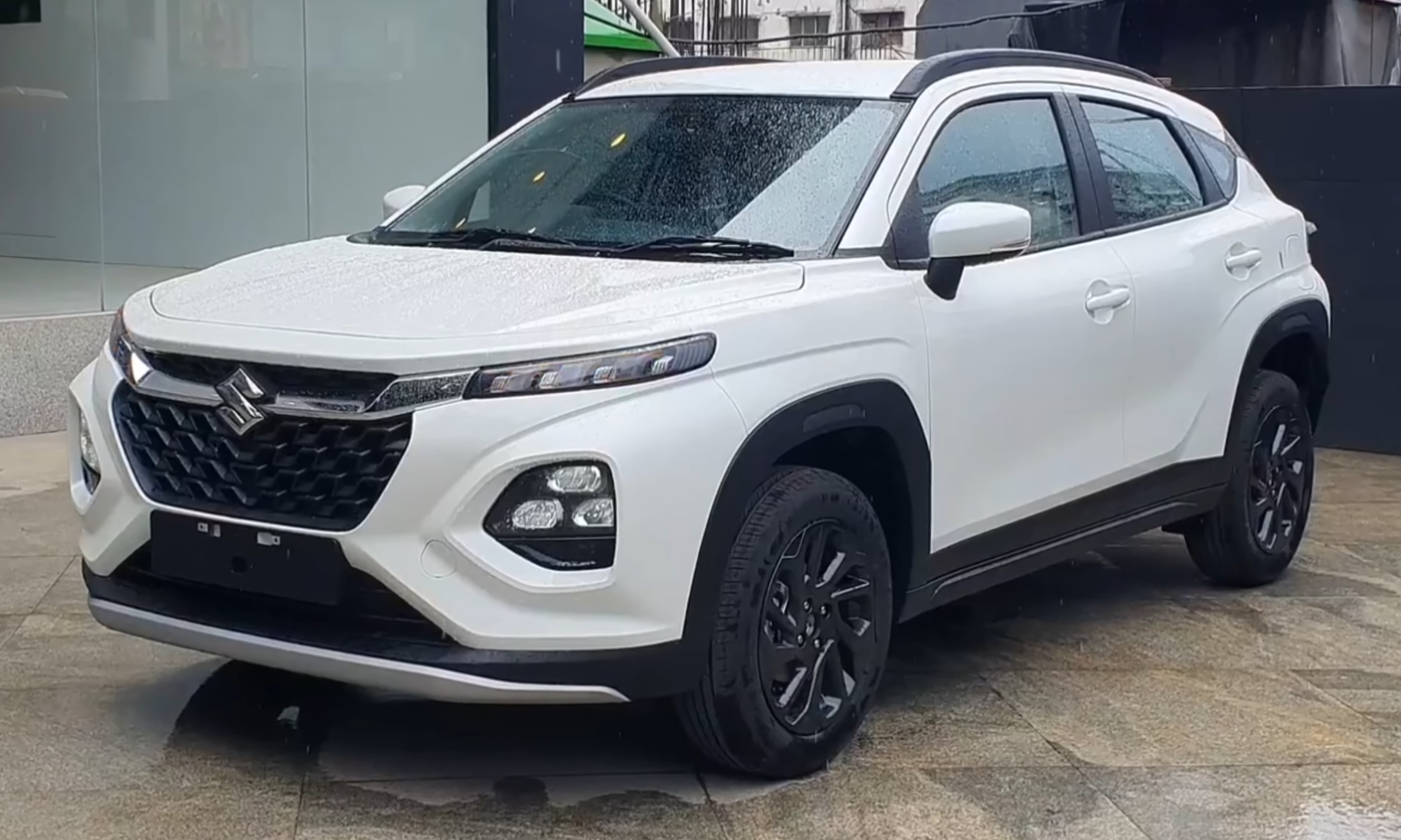
Maruti Suzuki Fronx
(179,894 sold)

=== China ===
In 2018, sales of subcompact crossovers in the country accounts for 19 percent of the total SUV market. The Baojun 510 is notable for being the highest-selling newly-introduced automobile nameplate in world's history. It received the record in January 2018 after recording 416,883 sales in its first 12 months in market, which was said to be the highest in the world for a new car.

Top 3 best-sellers in China, 2025

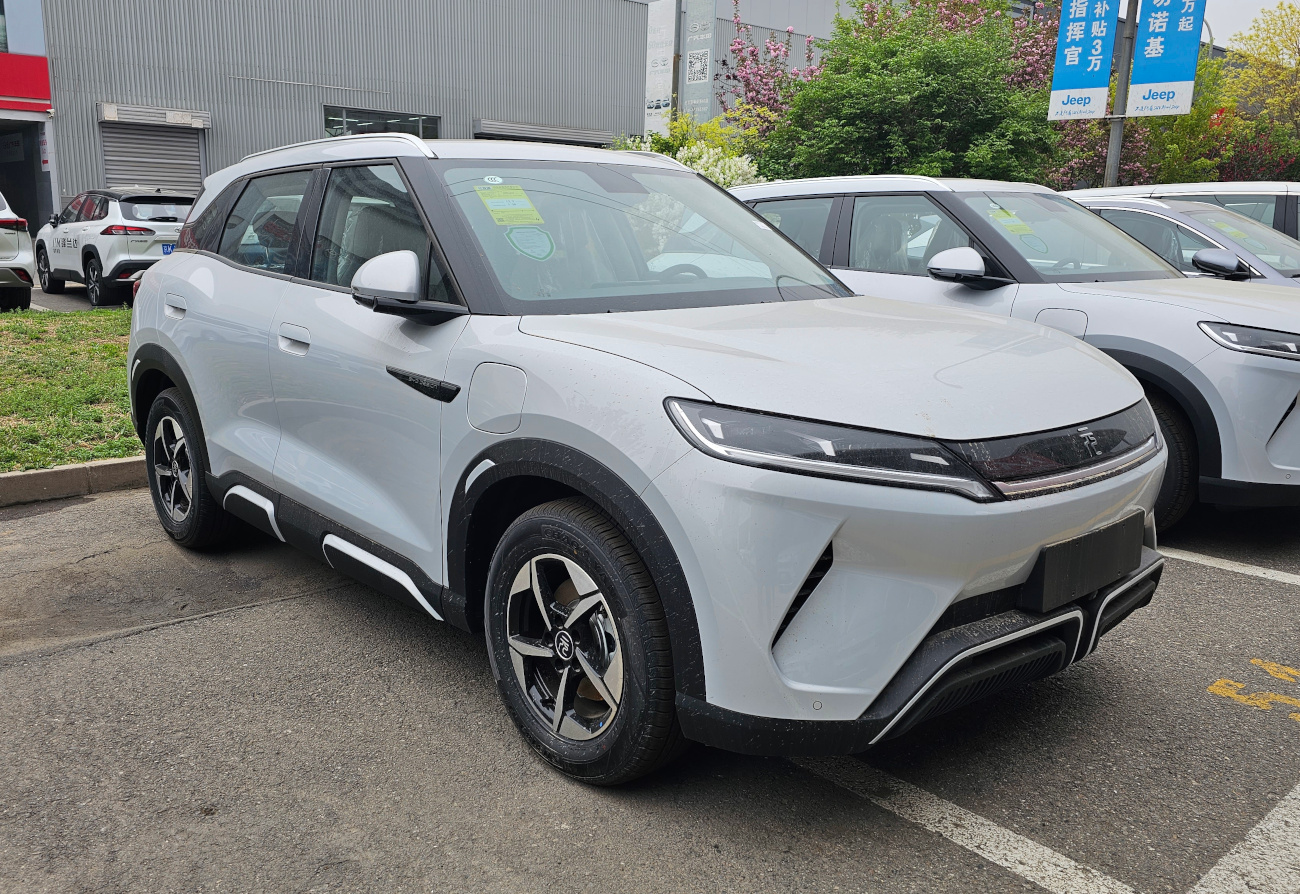
BYD Yuan Up
(267,179 sold)

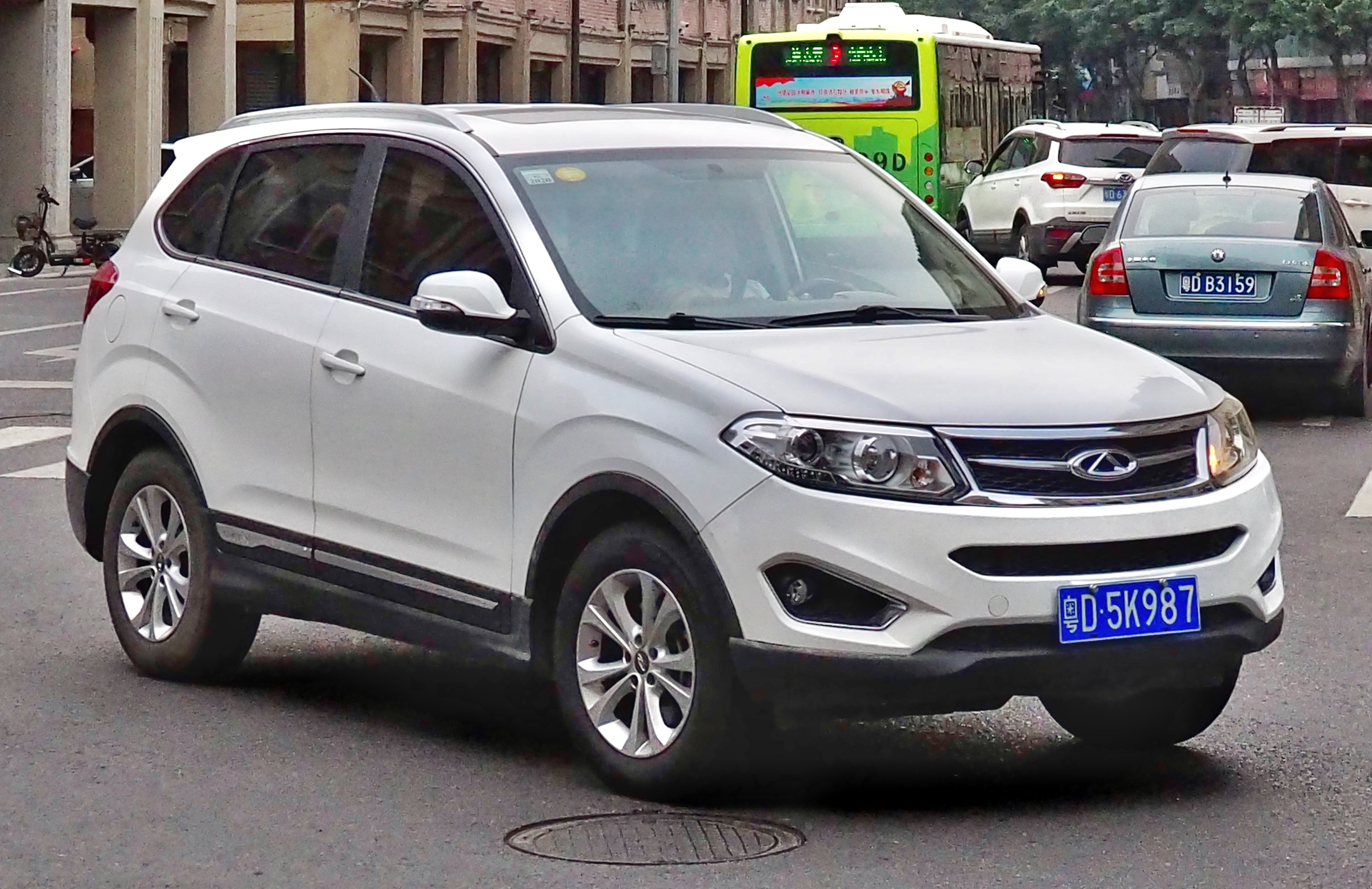
Chery Tiggo 5
(241,961 sold)

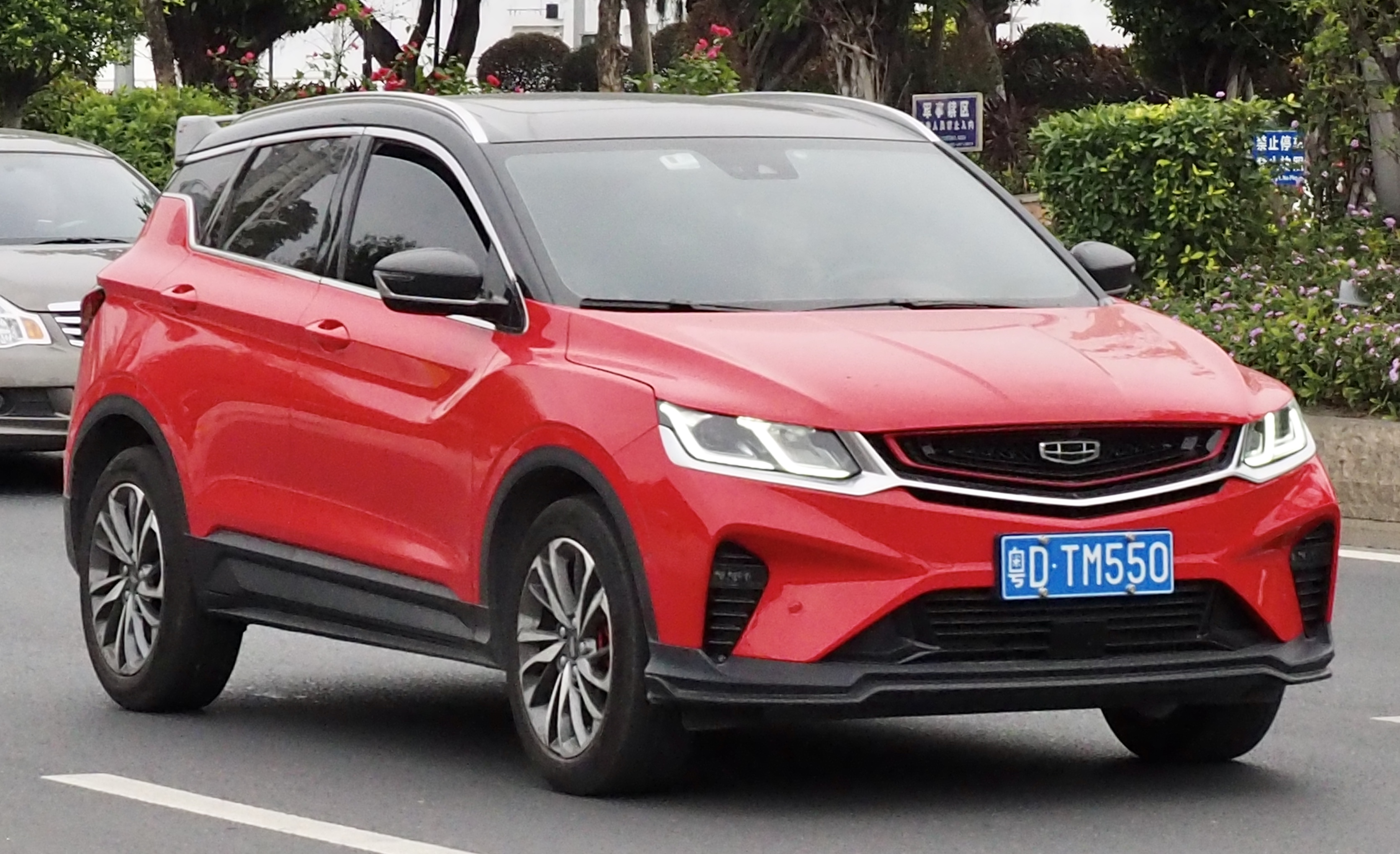
Geely Binyue
(237,593 sold)

=== Brazil ===
The segment is commonly known as "compact SUV" (Portuguese: SUV compacto) in the country. The Ford EcoSport is the first model of this segment when it was introduced in 2003. It is based on the Ford Fiesta B-segment hatchback and the Ford Fusion mini MPV. It went on to become a global model when the second-generation model was introduced in 2012, although it lost its segment market leader status after newcomers such as the Honda HR-V and Jeep Renegade was released in 2015.

Top 3 best-sellers in Brazil, 2025

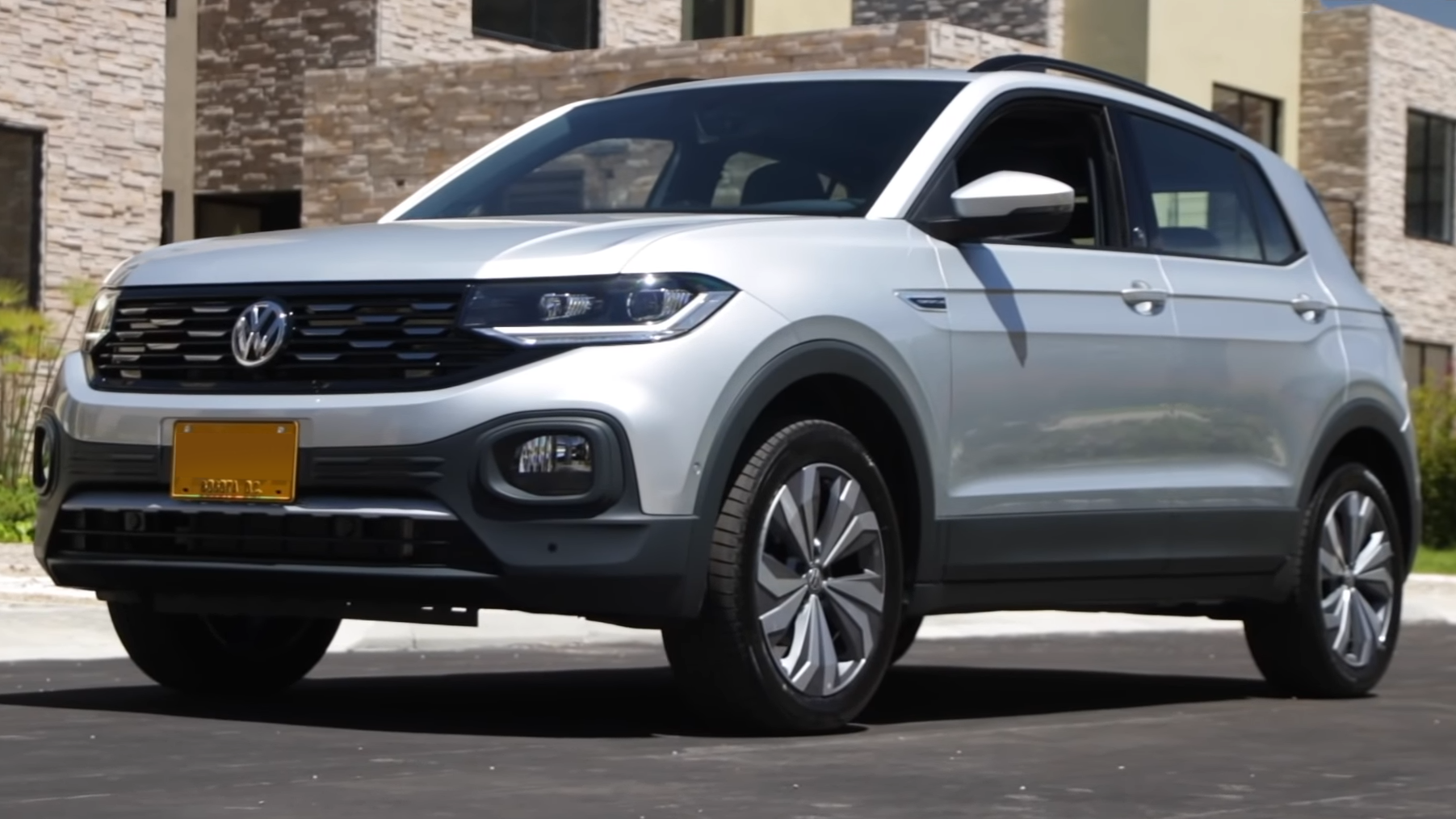
Volkswagen T-Cross
(92,842 sold)

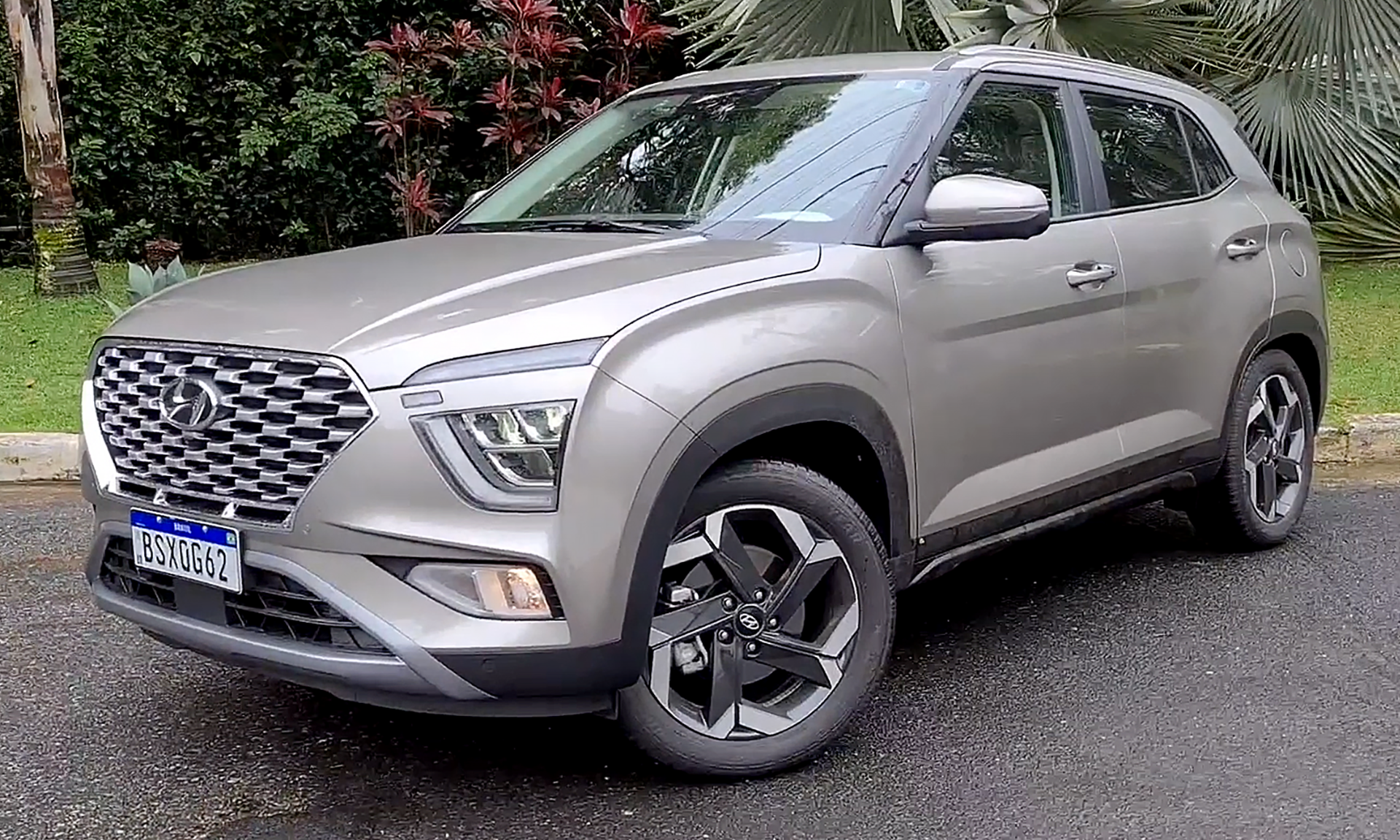
Hyundai Creta
(76,168 sold)

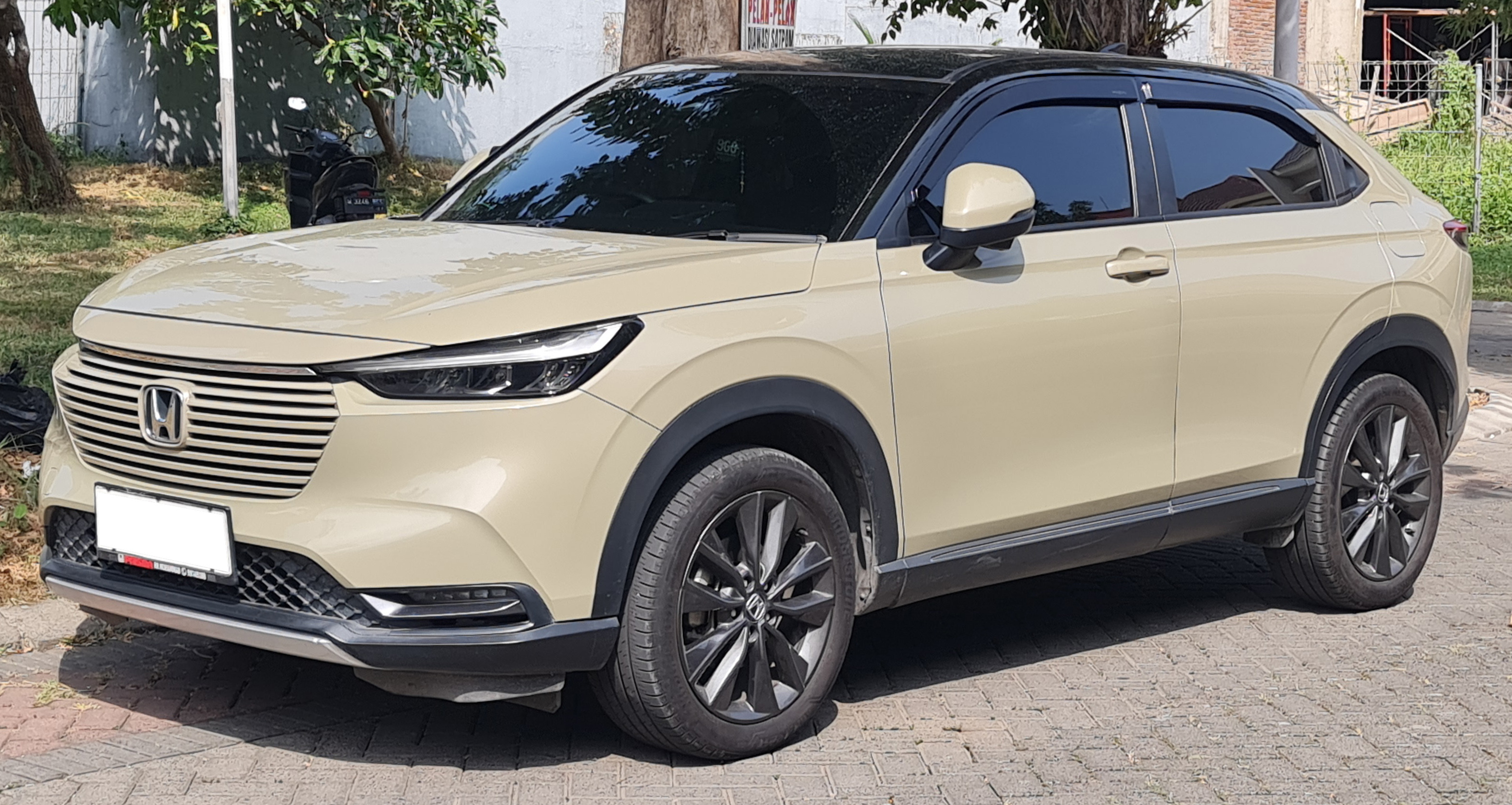
Honda HR-V
(61,234 sold)

=== Australia ===
In Australia, the segment is known as the "small SUV", "compact SUV" or "light SUV" segment. In 2021, it is the third-largest automobile segment in the market after pickup trucks and medium SUV at 13.7 percent share. As of 2022, there are more than 30 models from the segment being offered in the country.

== Three-row vehicles ==
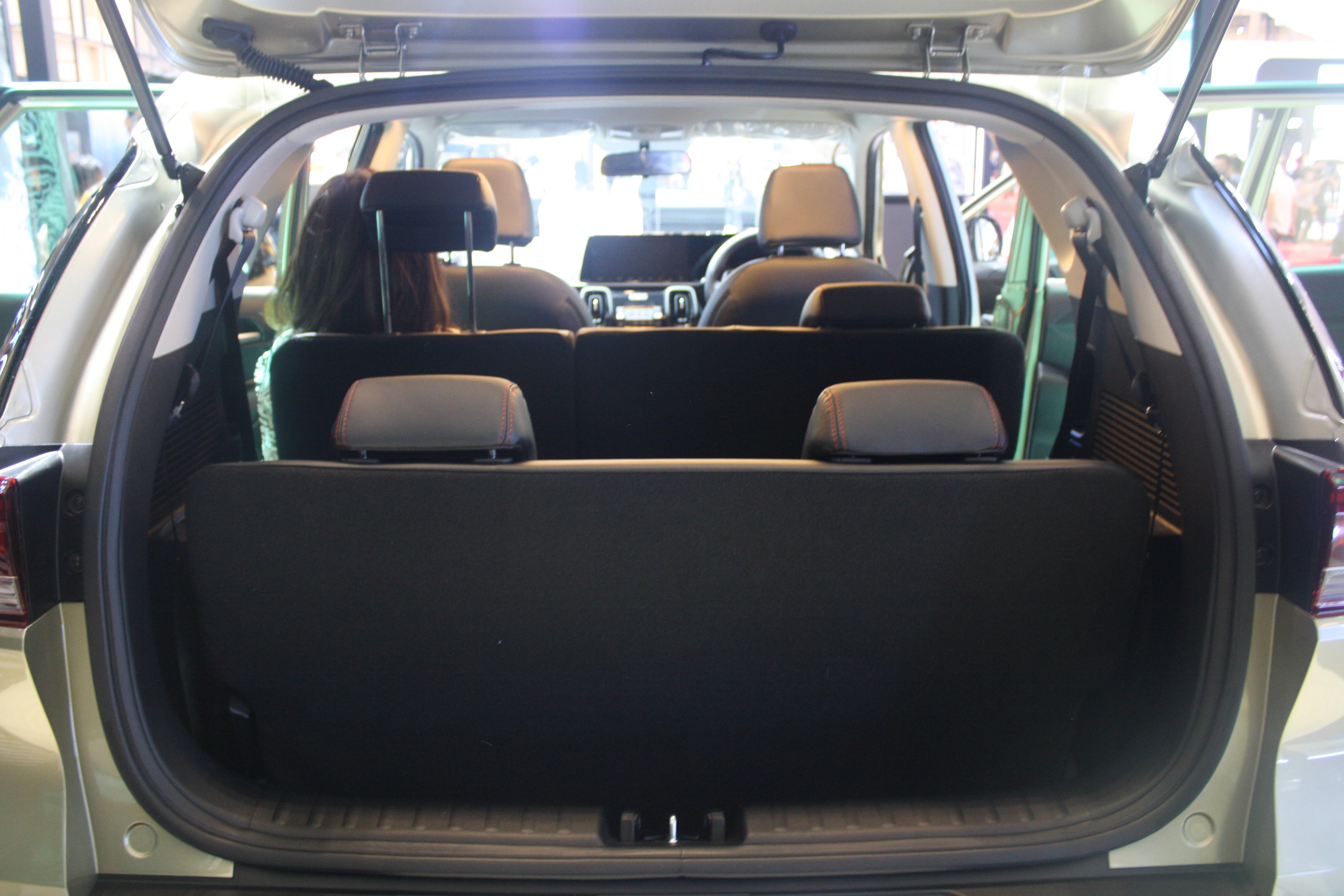
Optional third row seating in a Kia Sonet subcompact crossover

Subcompact crossovers with three-row seating has been developed for various markets. For example, the SsangYong Tivoli XLV or Tivoli Air offers third row seats by extending the rear overhang of the standard subcompact Tivoli. The Hyundai Alcazar introduced in 2021 is an extended Hyundai Creta, with longer exterior length and wheelbase, and has been marketed as a vehicle from a segment above, while the Kia Sonet offered a third row seating in Indonesia, a market dominated by three-row vehicles, without extending the body. The Honda BR-V has been developed as a three-row, seven-seater crossover while slotted as a B-segment SUV.

Three-row vehicles

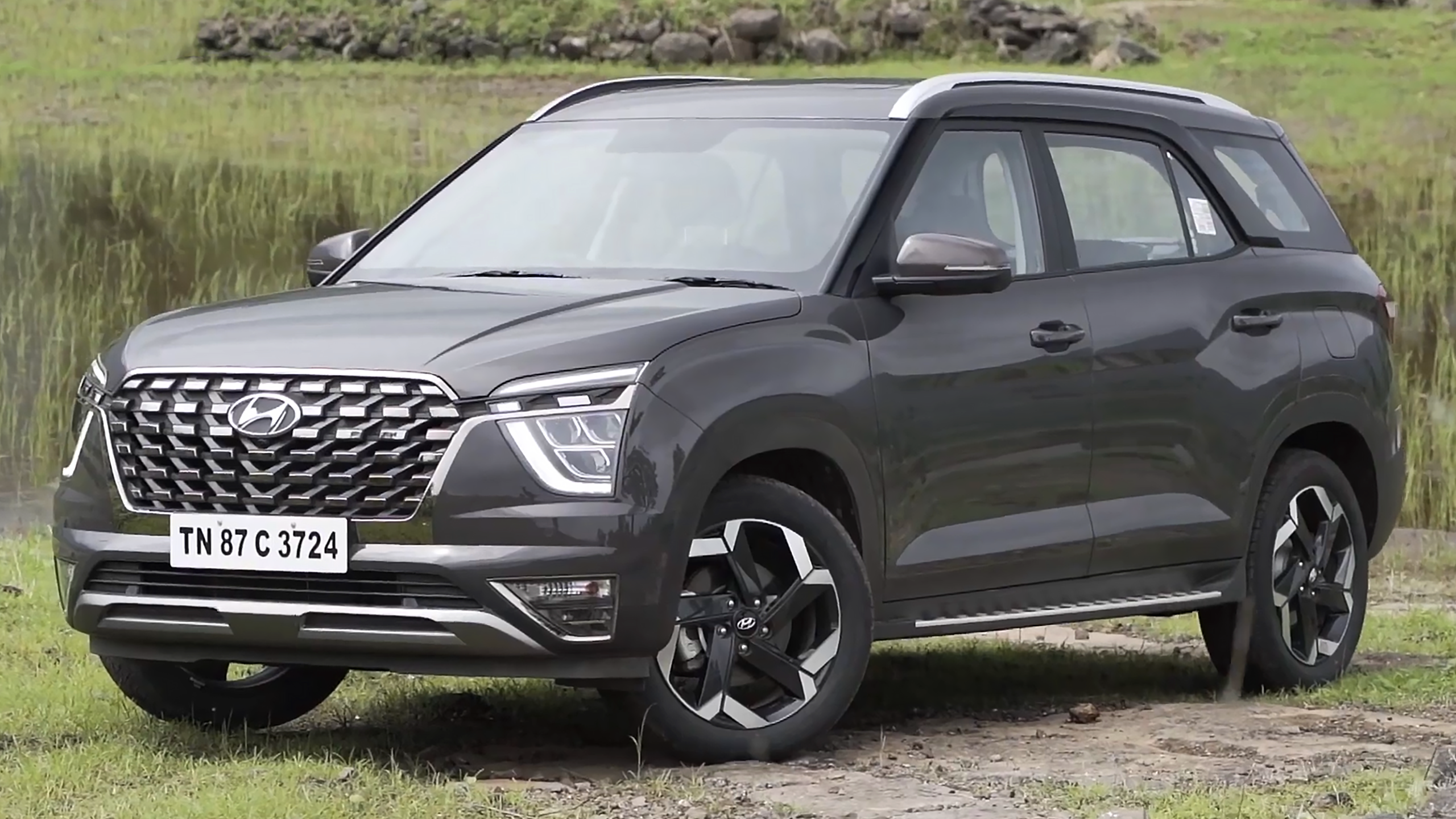
Hyundai Alcazar

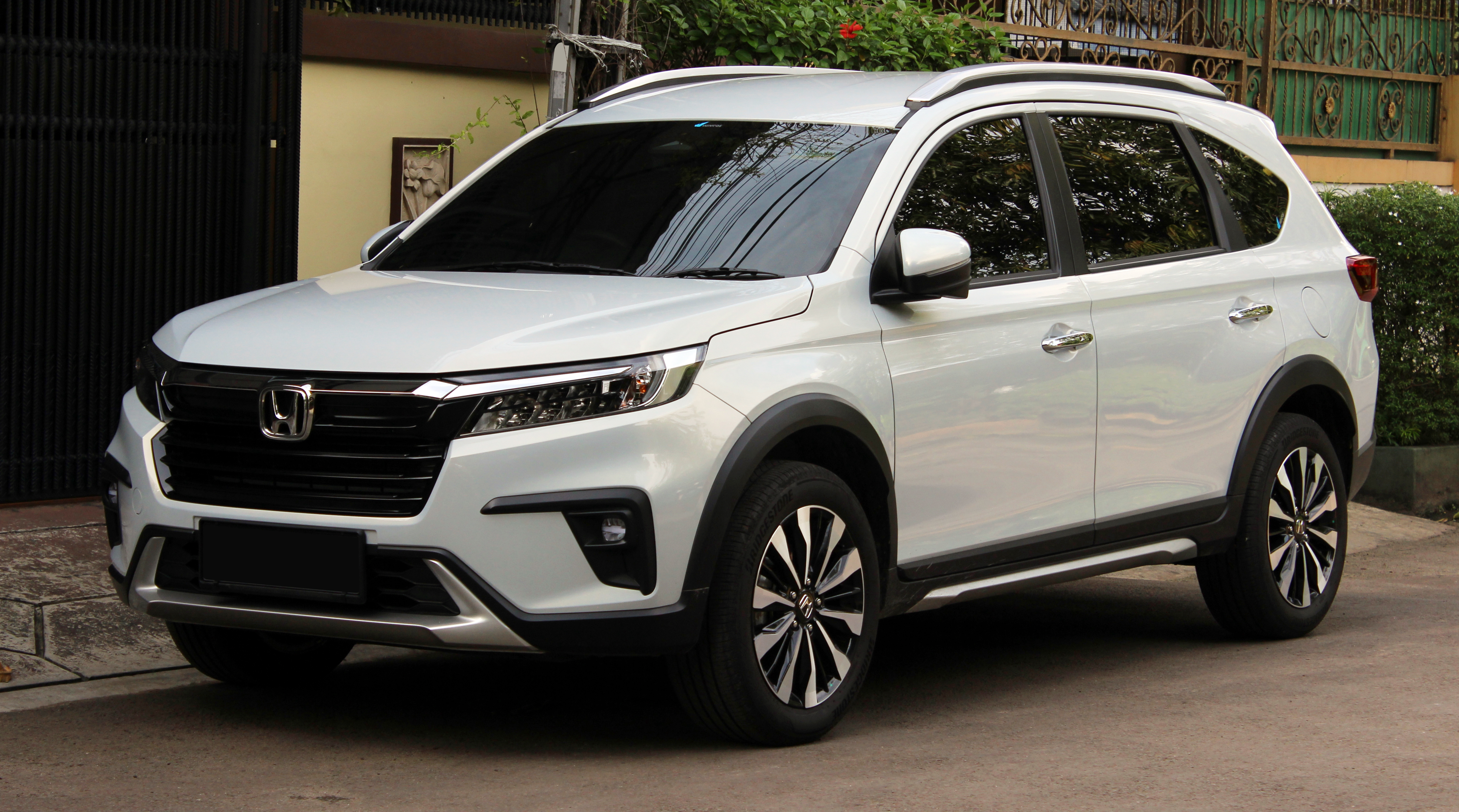
Honda BR-V

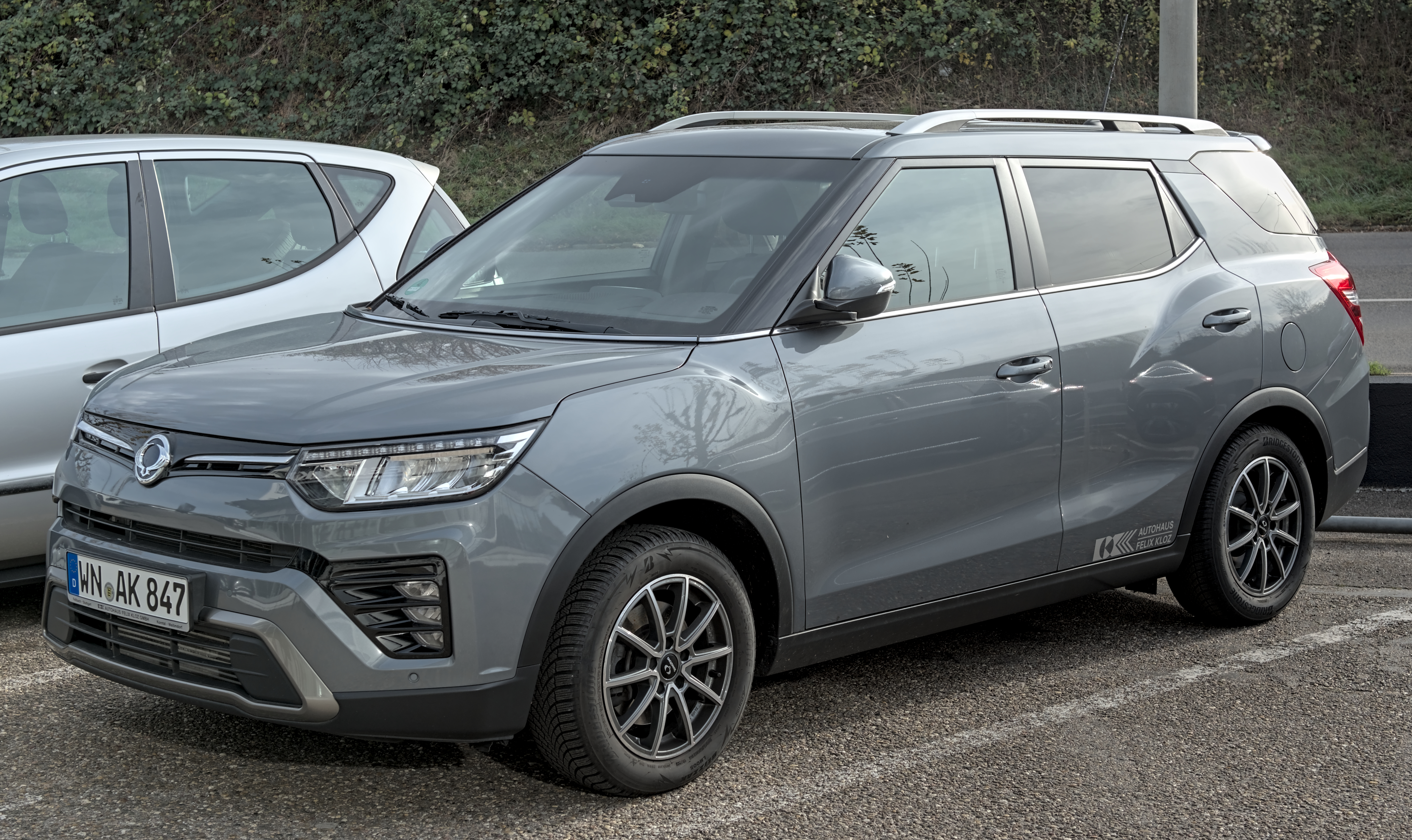
SsangYong Tivoli Grand

== Luxury vehicles ==
Numerous luxury car brands produce and market subcompact crossover SUVs, usually as an entry-level SUV offering of the respective brands. They are known by a variety terms, such as subcompact luxury crossover SUV, luxury subcompact SUV, premium small SUV, premium compact crossover and luxury small SUV. Subcompact luxury crossover SUVs are usually based on the platform of a compact car (C-segment), while some models are based on a mid-size car (D-segment) or a subcompact (B-segment) platform.

Vehicles in this segment are commonly built on a C-segment car platform or above. While being significantly more expensive, they offer similar driving and convenience advantages as mainstream subcompact crossover SUVs, with larger exterior dimensions, more refined interiors, more advanced technologies, higher engine power and added prestige. Early nameplates include the BMW X1 (introduced in 2009), Audi Q3 (2010), Mini Countryman (2010) and Range Rover Evoque (2011).

According to IHS Markit, in 2007, when the segment was effectively made up of only the Land Rover Freelander, global sales stood at 64,500 units. By 2016, sales had reached 1.147 million units.

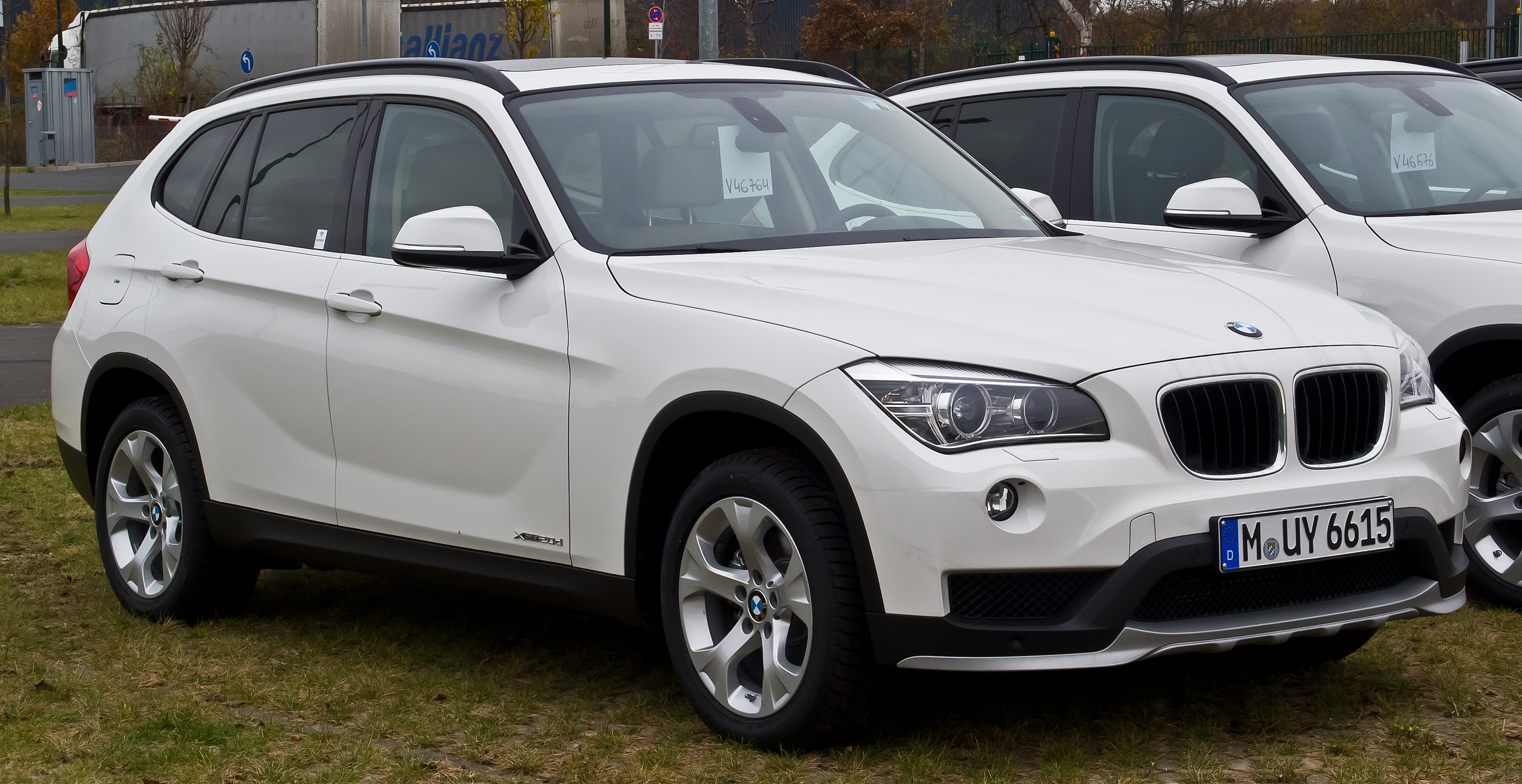
The first-generation BMW X1 is based on a rear-wheel-drive platform shared with the 3 Series

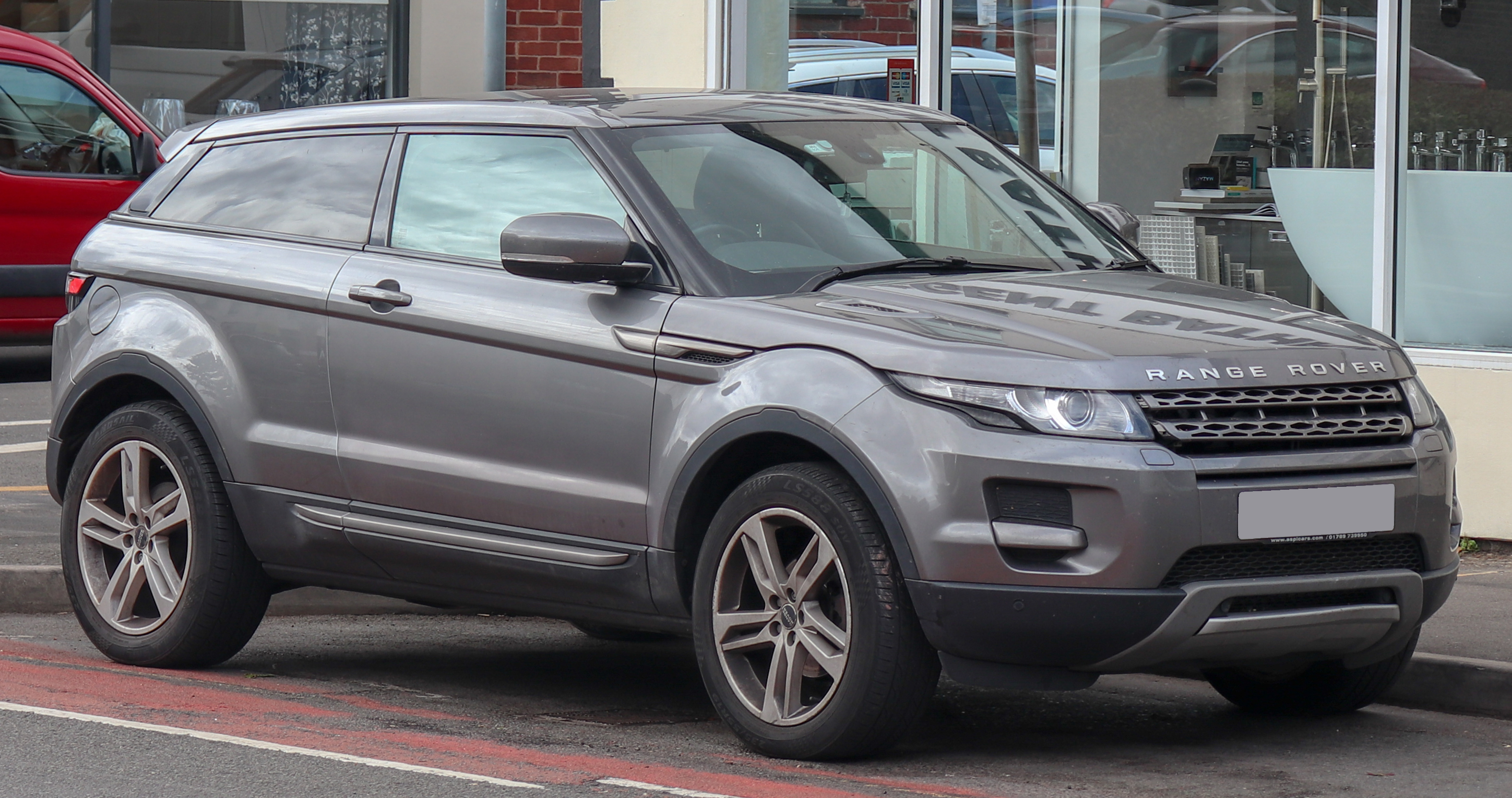
The Range Rover Evoque was available with five-door, three-door and two-door convertible body styles

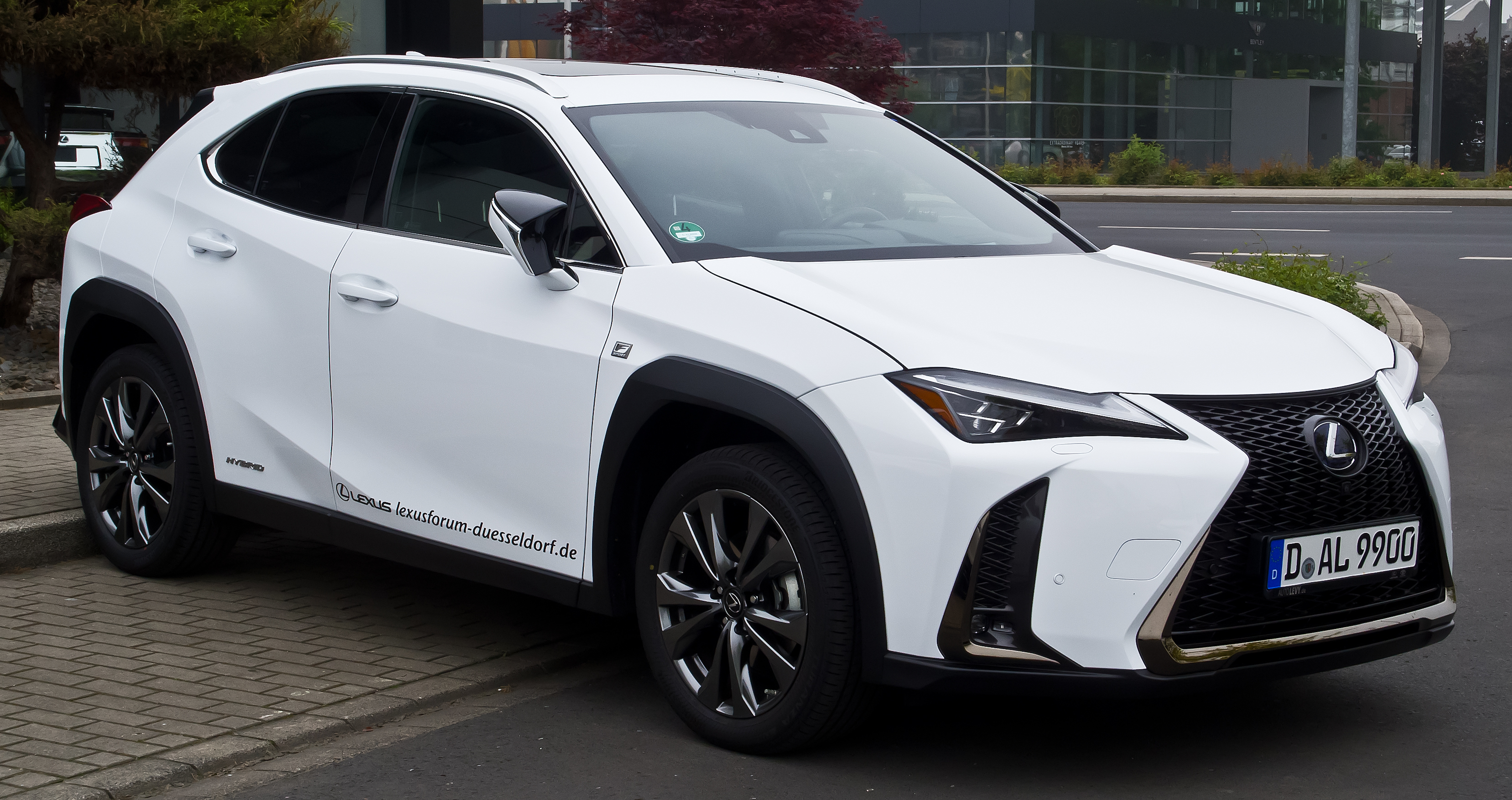
Lexus UX, sharing its platform with the compact (C-segment) Toyota Corolla

== Related segments ==
=== Mini SUV ===
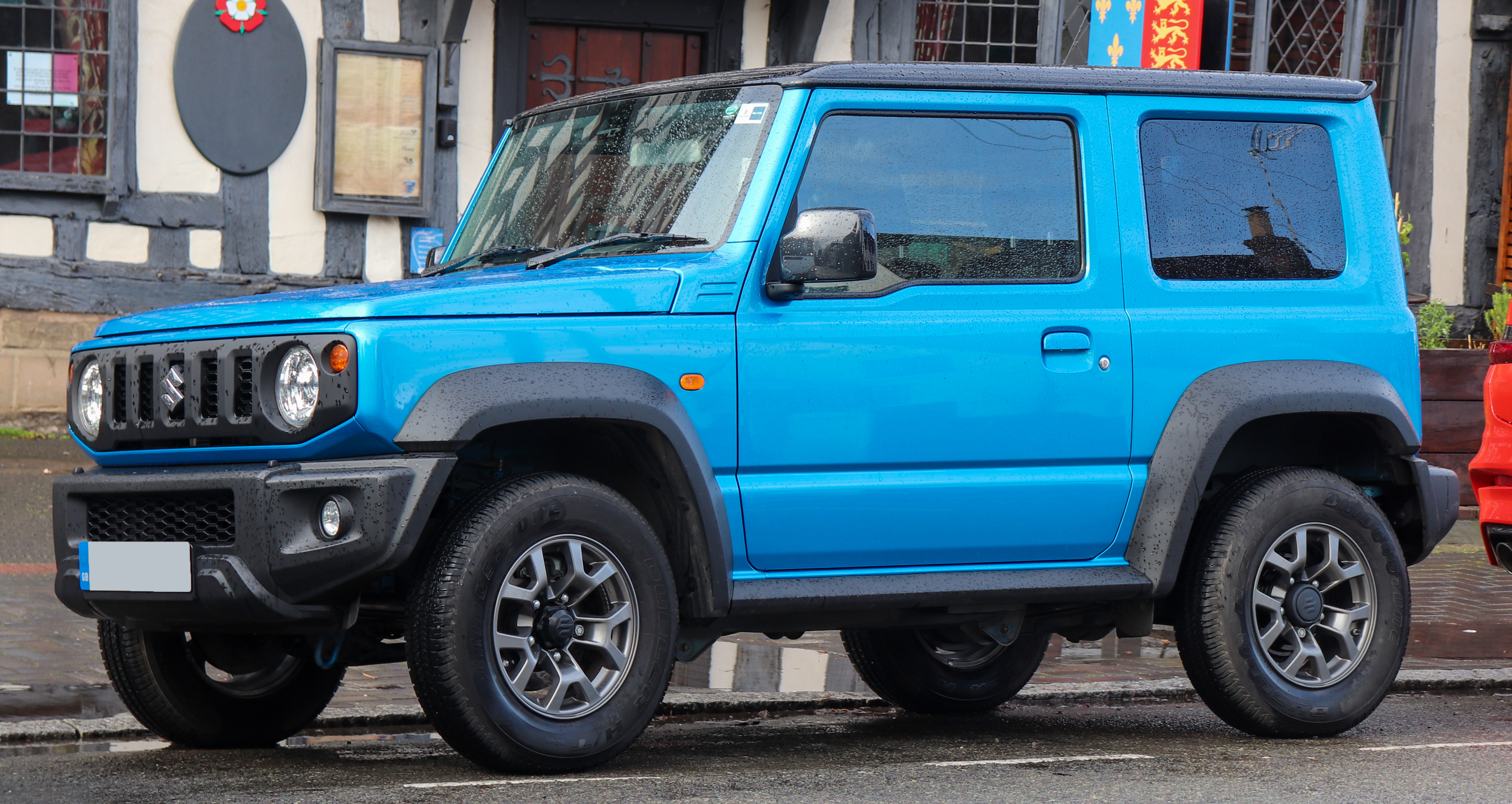
The Suzuki Jimny is a body-on-frame 4x4 off-roader with a kei car-sized body.

Mini SUV described the smallest class of body-on-frame SUVs, often engineered for off-road use with 4x4 drivetrain. At present, the term is mostly used to describe subcompact crossovers.

=== Crossover city car ===
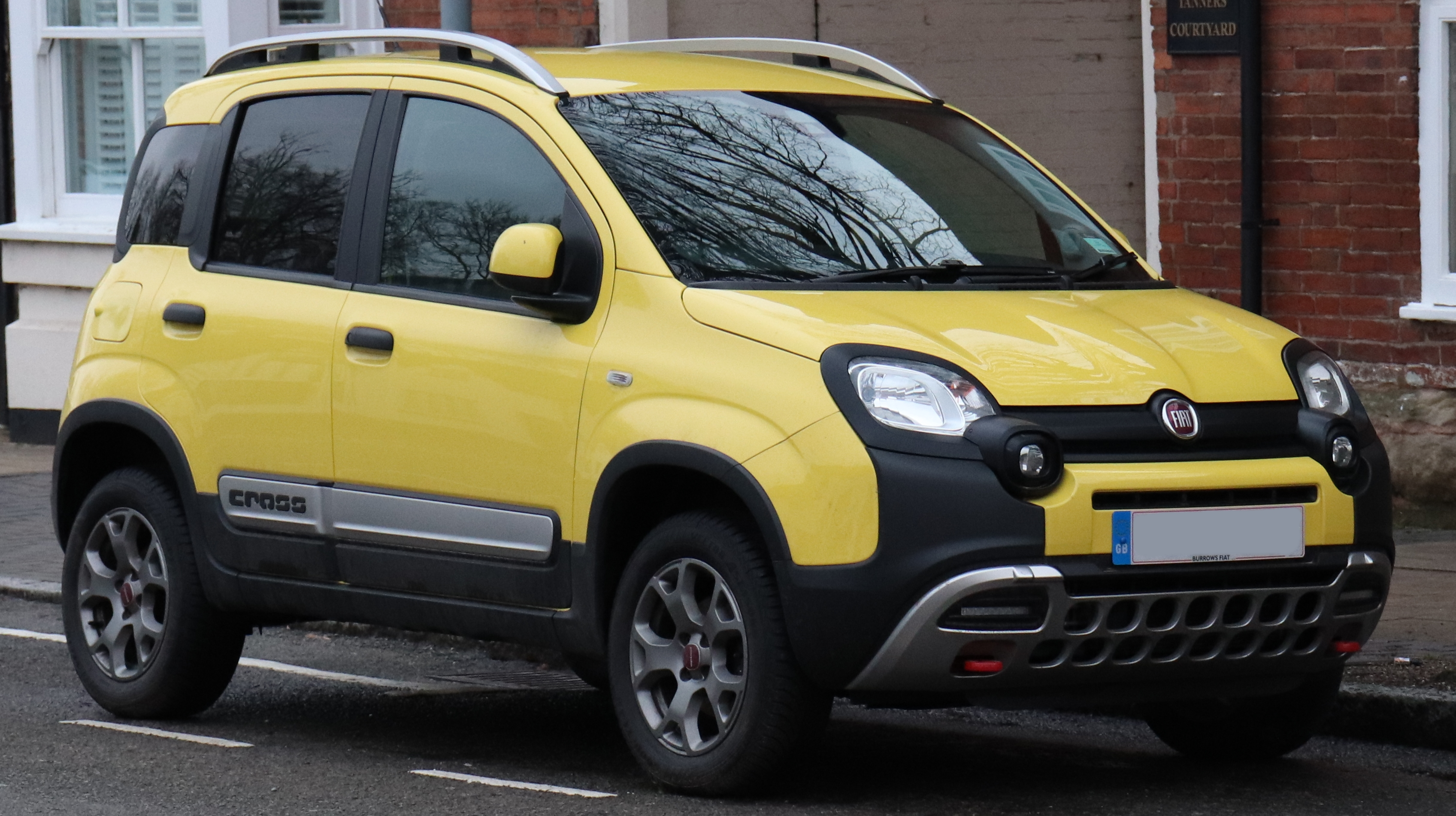
The Fiat Panda Cross shared the same body with the standard Panda, with additional exterior cladding kits, increased ground clearance and four-wheel-drive.

The term "crossover city car", "city crossover", "urban crossover", or "A-SUV" has been used for either smaller subcompact crossovers and A-segment vehicles or city cars that are designed with crossover styling, which are smaller than typical subcompact crossovers. Examples include the Toyota Aygo X, Hyundai Casper, Suzuki Ignis, Renault Kwid, Suzuki Xbee, and the Fiat Panda Cross/City Cross. Meanwhile, JATO Dynamics defines the A-SUV class as SUVs with an exterior length between 3,900–4,100 mm (153.5–161.4 in).

== See also ==
- Crossover (automobile)
- Subcompact car
- B-segment
- Sport utility vehicle
- Car classification
