= Jagdish Choudhary =

Indian politician

Member of the Bihar Legislative Assembly
- In office 1977–1985
- Preceded by: Established
- Succeeded by: Ram Chandra Paswan
- Constituency: Darbhanga Rural, Bihar
- In office 1990–1995
- Preceded by: Ram Chandra Paswan
- Succeeded by: Mohan Ram
- Constituency: Darbhanga Rural, Bihar

Personal details
- Born: Jagdish Choudhary; 1942
- Died: 21 July 2014 (aged 71–72) Patna
- Party: Janata Dal
- Other political affiliations: Janata Party

Jagdish Choudhary (1942 - 21 July 2014) was an indian politician from Bihar. He served as member of the Bihar Legislative Assembly for three terms. He was elected to the Bihar Legislative Assembly in 1977 and 1980 as a member of Janata Party. Then he was elected to the Bihar Assembly for third term in year 1990 as a member of Janata Dal.
