= Shanxi Hangtian Victory V-series =

Chinese microvan

Shanxi Hangtian Victory
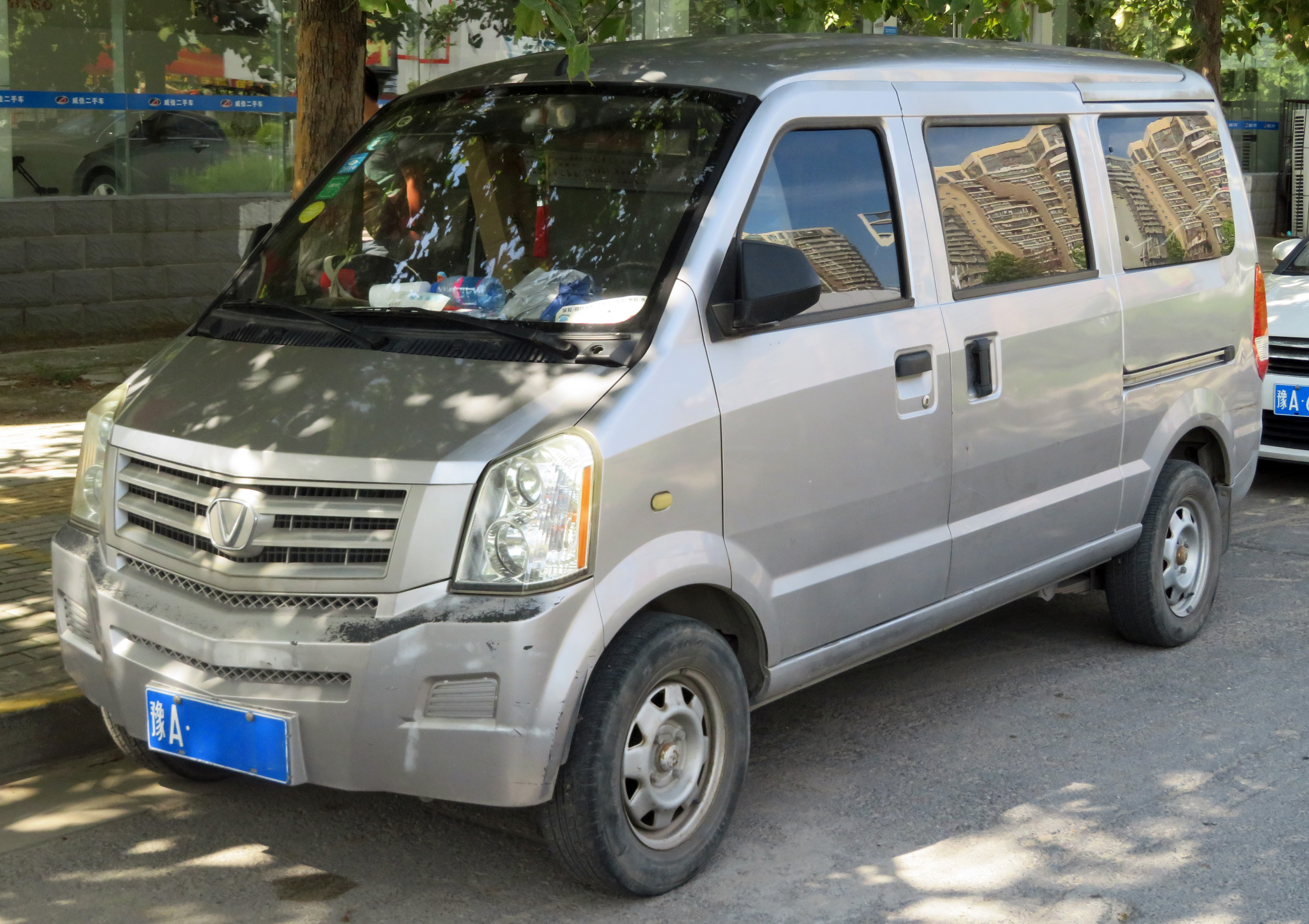

Overview
- Manufacturer: Guizhou Hangtian Chenggong Automobile
- Also called: Shanxi Hangtian GHT6400; Shanxi Hangtian Victory V1/V2 Mini Van
- Production: 2012–present
- Assembly: China

Body and chassis
- Class: Microvan
- Body style: 5-door minivan

Powertrain
- Engine: 1.2 L HH465QE6 I4
- Transmission: 5 speed manual

Dimensions
- Wheelbase: 2,700 mm (106.3 in) (V1); 2,850 mm (112.2 in) (V2)
- Length: 4,010 mm (157.9 in) (V1); 4,330 mm (170.5 in) (V2)
- Width: 1,620 mm (63.8 in) (V1); 1,650 mm (65.0 in) (V2)
- Height: 1,915 mm (75.4 in) (V1); 1,920 mm (75.6 in) (V2)
- Curb weight: 1,160 kg (2,557 lb)

The Shanxi Hangtian Victory V-series is a series of five-door microvan made by Guizhou Hangtian Chenggong Automobile under the Shanxi Hangtian Victory brand. Guizhou Hangtian Chenggong Automobile is a subsidiary of Shanxi Victory. The V-series includes several variants, with the V2E and BEV6 being the new energy variants, while the V1 and V2 are ICE models.

== Overview ==
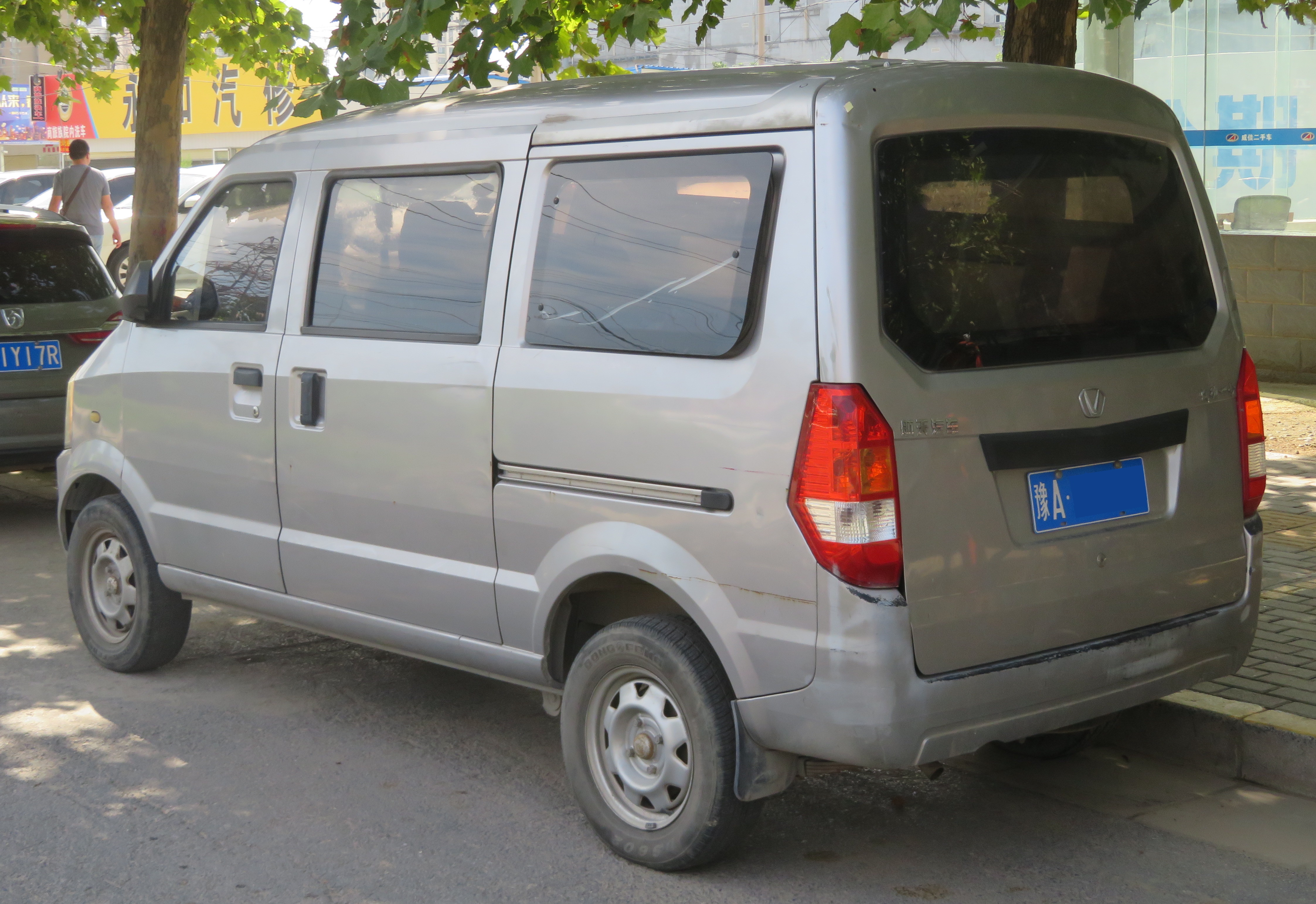
Rear view

The Shanxi Hangtian Victory V1 and V2 vans are powered by a 1.2-liter HH465QE6 inline-four engine producing 60 hp (45 kW; 61 PS) based on an engine design from Suzuki. Both engine options are mated to a 5-speed manual gearbox. Price of the Shanxi Hangtian Victory at the dealers starts from 43,000 yuan (US$6,700).

The Shanxi Hangtian Victory V-series is equipped with front independent MacPherson struts and rear non-independent leaf springs. The powertrain is middle engined and rear-wheel drive.

The manufacturer of the Shanxi Hangtian Victory vans, the Guizhou Hangtian Chenggong Automobile, is based in Zunyi city in Guizhou Province. It became a subsidiary of Shanxi Victory in 2006. The name translates to ‘Guizhou Aerospace Automotive Manufacturing Corporation.

== Design controversies ==
Just like a few other vehicles produced by Guizhou Hangtian Chenggong Automobile, the front fascia design of the Shanxi Hangtian Victory V-series is controversial as it heavily resembles the front end of the third generation Cadillac Escalade.
