= Eeco =

Eeco or EECO may refer to

- Early Eocene Climatic Optimum, a warm period 50 million years ago
- Maruti Suzuki Eeco, an Indian microvan
