= Jagdish =

Jagdish is an Indian masculine given name. Notable people with the name include:

- Jagdish Bhagwati (born 1934), Indian-born American economist
- Jagdish Bhola, Indian wrestler
- Jagdish Bishnoi (born 1972), Indian javelin thrower
- Jagdish Capoor, Indian banker
- Jagdish Chandra Mahindra (1892–1951), Indian industrialist
- Jagdish Chandra Jain (1909–1993), Indian scholar
- Jagdish Chaturvedi (born 1984), Indian stand-up comedian
- Jagdish Gupt (1924–2001), Indian poet
- Jagdish Joshi (1937–2016), Indian children's book illustrator
- Jagdish Khattar (1942–2021), Indian businessman
- Jagdish Khebudkar (1932–2011), Indian musician
- Jagdish Koonjul (born 1952), Mauritian diplomat
- Jagdish Lal (1920–1997), Indian cricketer
- Jagdish Mali (1954–2013), Indian fashion and film photographer
- Jagdish Mittal (1925–2025), Indian artist and art collector
- Jagdish Mukhi (born 1942), Indian politician
- Jagdish Nehra (c. 1943–2023), Indian politician
- Jagdish Patel (born 1962), Indian politician
- Jagdish Piyush (1950–2021), Indian journalist
- Jagdish Pradhan (born 1953), Indian politician
- Jagdish Raj (1928–2013), Indian actor
- Jagdish Sethi (1903–1969), Indian actor and director
- Jagdish Singh (disambiguation), several people
- Jagdish Sonkar (born 1967), Indian politician
- Jagdish Thakor (born 1957), Indian politician
- Jagdish Tytler (born 1944), Indian politician
- Jagdish Zope (born 1995), Indian cricketer
