= Rajesh Kumar Mandal =

Indian politician

Member of the Bihar Legislative Assembly
- Incumbent
- Assumed office 14 November 2025
- Preceded by: Lalit Kumar Yadav
- Constituency: Darbhanga Rural

Personal details
- Party: Janata Dal (United)
- Education: Lalit Narayan Mithila University
- Profession: Politician

Rajesh Kumar Mandal popularly known as Ishwar Mandal is an Indian politician from Bihar. He was elected as a Member of Legislative Assembly in 2025 Bihar Legislative Assembly election, representing the Darbhanga Rural constituency. He is also District President of Janata Dal (United), Darbhanga. He is a member of the Janata Dal (United).
