= Darbhanga Rural Assembly constituency =

Coordinates: 26°08′58″N 85°51′03″E

Darbhanga Rural
- Constituency No. - for the Bihar Legislative Assembly

Constituency details
- Country: India
- Region: East India
- State: Bihar
- District: Darbhanga
- Lok Sabha constituency: Darbhanga
- Established: 1977
- Total electors: 290,287
- Reservation: None

Member of Legislative Assembly
- 18th Bihar Legislative Assembly
- Incumbent Rajesh Kumar Mandal
- Party: JD(U)
- Alliance: NDA
- Elected year: 2025

Darbhanga Rural is an assembly constituency in Darbhanga district in the Indian state of Bihar. It has been an open seat since 2010 but was earlier reserved for scheduled castes.

== Overview ==
As per Delimitation of Parliamentary and Assembly constituencies Order, 2008, No. 82 Darbhanga Rural Assembly constituency is composed of the following: Manigachhi community development block; Nazra Mohammada, Narayanpur, Adalpur, Atihar, Balha, Bijuli, Chhotaipatti, Dhoi, Dularpur, Ghorghatta, Kharua, Khutwara, Loam, Muria, Nainaghat, Sonki and Bhalpatti gram panchayats of Darbhanga CD Block.

Darbhanga Rural Assembly constituency is part of No. 14 Darbhanga (Lok Sabha constituency).

== Members of the Legislative Assembly ==
Year	Name	Party
1977	Jagdish Choudhary	Janata Party
1980	Jagdish Choudhary	Janata Party
1985	Ram Chandra Paswan	Indian National Congress
1990	Jagdish Choudhary	Janata Dal
1995	Mohan Ram	Janata Dal
2000	Pitambar Paswan	Rashtriya Janata Dal
2005	Pitambar Paswan	Rashtriya Janata Dal
2005	Pitambar Paswan	Rashtriya Janata Dal
2010	Lalit Kumar Yadav	Rashtriya Janata Dal
2015	Lalit Kumar Yadav	Rashtriya Janata Dal
2020	Lalit Kumar Yadav	Rashtriya Janata Dal
2025	Rajesh Kumar Mandal	Janata Dal (United)

== Election results ==
=== 2025 ===
2025 Bihar Legislative Assembly election: Darbhanga Rural
Party	Candidate	Votes	%	±%
JD(U)	Rajesh Kumar Mandal	80,624	44.05	+4.15
RJD	Lalit Kumar Yadav	62,232	34.0	−7.26
AIMIM	Md Jalaluddin Sahil	17,008	9.29	
Independent	Shyam Paswan	4,638	2.53	
JSP	Shoaib Khan	3,814	2.08	
Independent	Ram Sukamar Yadav	2,901	1.58	
NCP	Jai Kishun Sahni	2,330	1.27	
BSP	Jagat Narayan Nayak	2,118	1.16	+0.11
NOTA	None of the above	4,516	2.47	−0.03
Majority		18,392	10.05	+8.69
Turnout		183,048	63.06	+8.94
JD(U) hold		Swing		

=== 2020 ===
Bihar Assembly election, 2020: Darbhanga Rural
Party	Candidate	Votes	%	±%
RJD	Lalit Kumar Yadav	64,929	41.26	▼10.12
JD(U)	Faraz Fatmi	62,788	39.9	
LJP	Pradeep Kumar Thakur	17,605	11.19	
Independent	Deo Narayan Gupta	3,032	1.93	
Independent	Azizur Rahaman	2,088	1.33	
BSP	Sunil Kumar Mandal	1,659	1.05	▼1.08
NOTA	None of the above	3,937	2.5	▼0.9
Majority		2,141	1.36	▼23.76
Turnout		157,348	54.12	▲2.01
RJD hold		Swing		

=== 2015 ===
Bihar Assembly election, 2015: Darbhanga Rural
Party	Candidate	Votes	%	±%
RJD	Lalit Kumar Yadav	70,557	51.38	
HAM(S)	Naushad Ahmad	36,066	26.26	
JAP(L)	Chandrakant Singh	6,690	4.87	
Independent	Jay Kant Jha	3,686	2.68	
Independent	Vishwanath Mandal	3,466	2.52	
Independent	Md Jasim Haider	3,018	2.2	
BSP	Ram Dayal Sahni	2,925	2.13	
CPI(ML)L	Sanichari Devi	1,624	1.18	
Independent	Kapleshwar Ram	1,389	1.01	
SP	Mithilesh Kumar Yadav	1,345	0.98	
SS	Shiv Narayan Mandal	1,321	0.96	
NOTA	None of the above	4,671	3.4	
Majority		34,491	25.12	
Turnout		137,328	52.11	
RJD hold		Swing		
