= Jagdish Singh =

Jagdish Singh may refer to:

- Jagdish Singh (boxer), Indian boxer and boxing coach
- Jagdish Singh (skier) (born 1991), Indian cross-country skier
- Jagdish Singh (badminton) (born 1993), Malaysian badminton player
- Jagdish Prasad Singh, Indian writer
