= Microvan =

Kei-class van

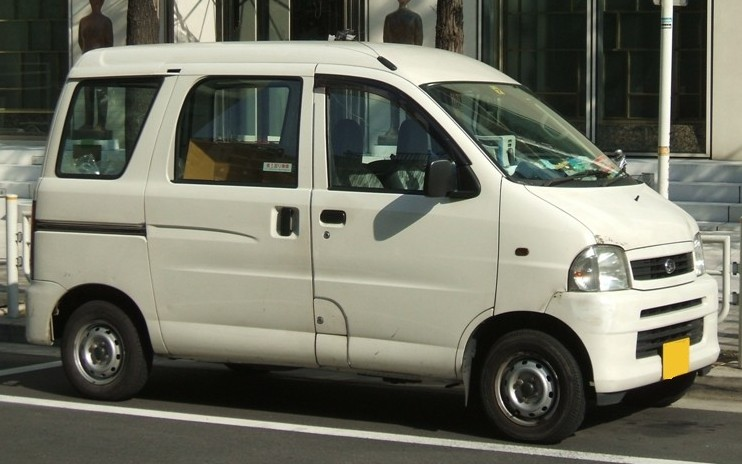
A Daihatsu Hijet (ninth generation)

A microvan is a van or minivan that falls within the Japanese kei car classification or similar categories, and is smaller than a mini MPV. These vehicles are designed for narrow roads and tight urban spaces. Popular Mechanics magazine described an example of a microvan, the Subaru Sambar, as a one-box four-passenger design with a water-cooled 544 cc two-cylinder engine in the rear.

== Markets ==
In China, these vehicles are nicknamed miàn bāo chē (bread car) due to their bread-loaf-like shape. Similarly, in several Hispanic American countries, these vehicles are called pan de molde, which means "bread loaf". In Indonesia, it is commonly called a minibus due to its tall roof, perceived as resembling a miniature bus; the term is also used generally to refer to any type of three-row MPVs.

Outside of China and Japan, microvans are also common in Southeast Asia, South Asia, Africa, Latin America, and the Middle East. Microvans share characteristics with other MPV sizes; for example, they commonly have sliding doors. Generally, they have a capacity for six, seven, or eight passengers. These vehicles have fixed third-row seats, a single vehicle cannot be used both for passenger transport and larger-cargo transport without refitting; therefore, microvans are not usually considered multi-purpose vehicles.

== Economics ==
Some locations make owning these vehicles particularly inexpensive due to advantageous tax breaks and lowered insurance premiums. For example, Japan has lower taxes on microvans. They are less expensive to operate compared to "regular" cars. In rural Japan, kei-car vehicles are also exempted from a certification that adequate parking is available for the vehicle. They are, therefore, widely used for small businesses in these places.

== Design ==
Microvans often have advanced technologies to maintain performance and comfort, while their styling is boxy to maximize the use of height and footprint limits and typically use small wheels to minimize wheel arch and suspension intrusion into the interiors. However, their small size and design limitations, such as inherently unstable short wheelbases, result in compromised handling and driving characteristics.

The Fiat 600 Multipla, launched in 1956, is recognized as the first microvan. It used the Fiat 600 rear-engine platform and provided seating for up to six people, with an overall length of 3,531 mm (139.0 in).

The first vehicle to adopt the bodystyle of a van, with the engine installed in front of the driver, was the 1970s Honda Life "StepVan". Some microvans use a drivetrain with the engine installed transversely, with front- or all-wheel drive. In contrast, others use a cabover approach, with the engine installed beneath the driver, while still using all-wheel- or rear-wheel-drive powertrains. Cabover variants usually share their chassis with kei truck derivatives from the same manufacturer.

Most microvans have two swinging front doors, two sliding rear doors, and a large tailgate. Seating can range from two to nine; these seats are usually very thin and vertical to optimize space. Metal panels replace the side windows in commercial-only versions of microvans; this type of microvan is sometimes called a "blind van". Some models also feature pick-up variants with one or two seat rows. Engines usually have displacements under 1.0 L; for example, Japanese microvans have a limit of 660 cc. Outside the Japanese market, microvans are available with 850-cc to 1.6-L engines.

The kei car regulation is used only in Japan, though other Asian automakers also design microvans with similar characteristics. The microvans are commonly known as "kei one-box" in Japan; their pickup versions are known as kei trucks.

== Gallery ==
=== Kei microvans ===
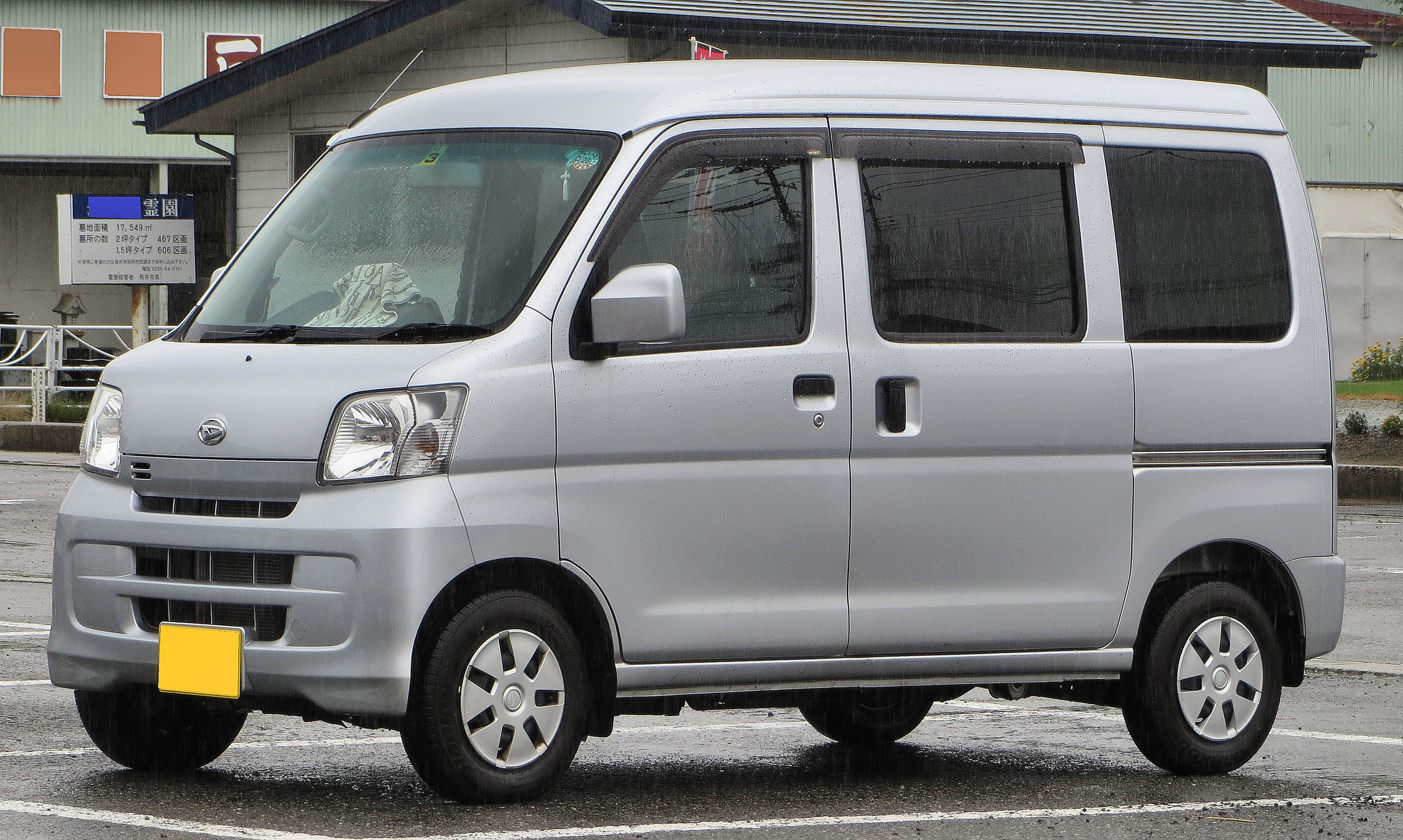
Daihatsu Hijet cargo

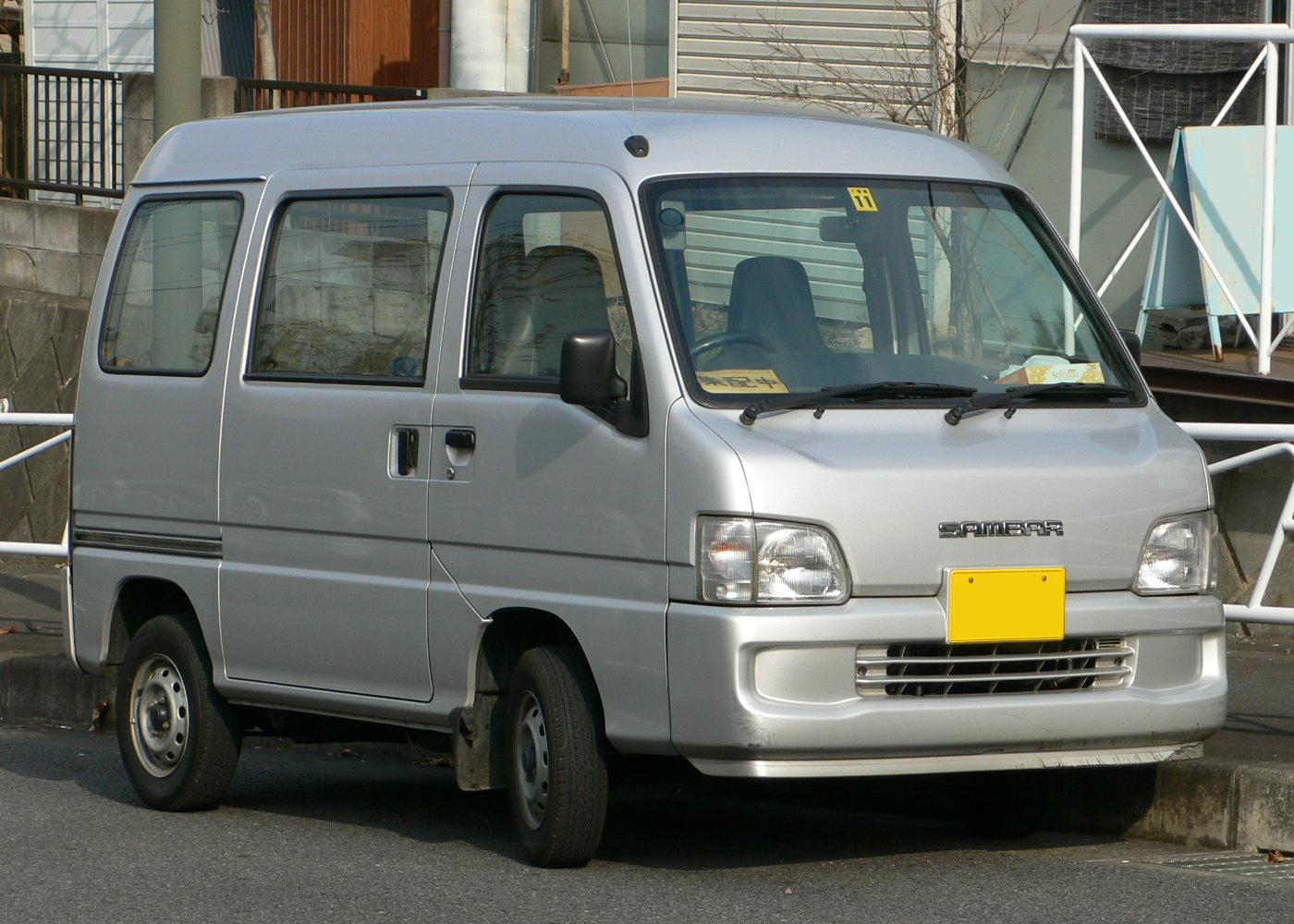
Subaru Sambar van

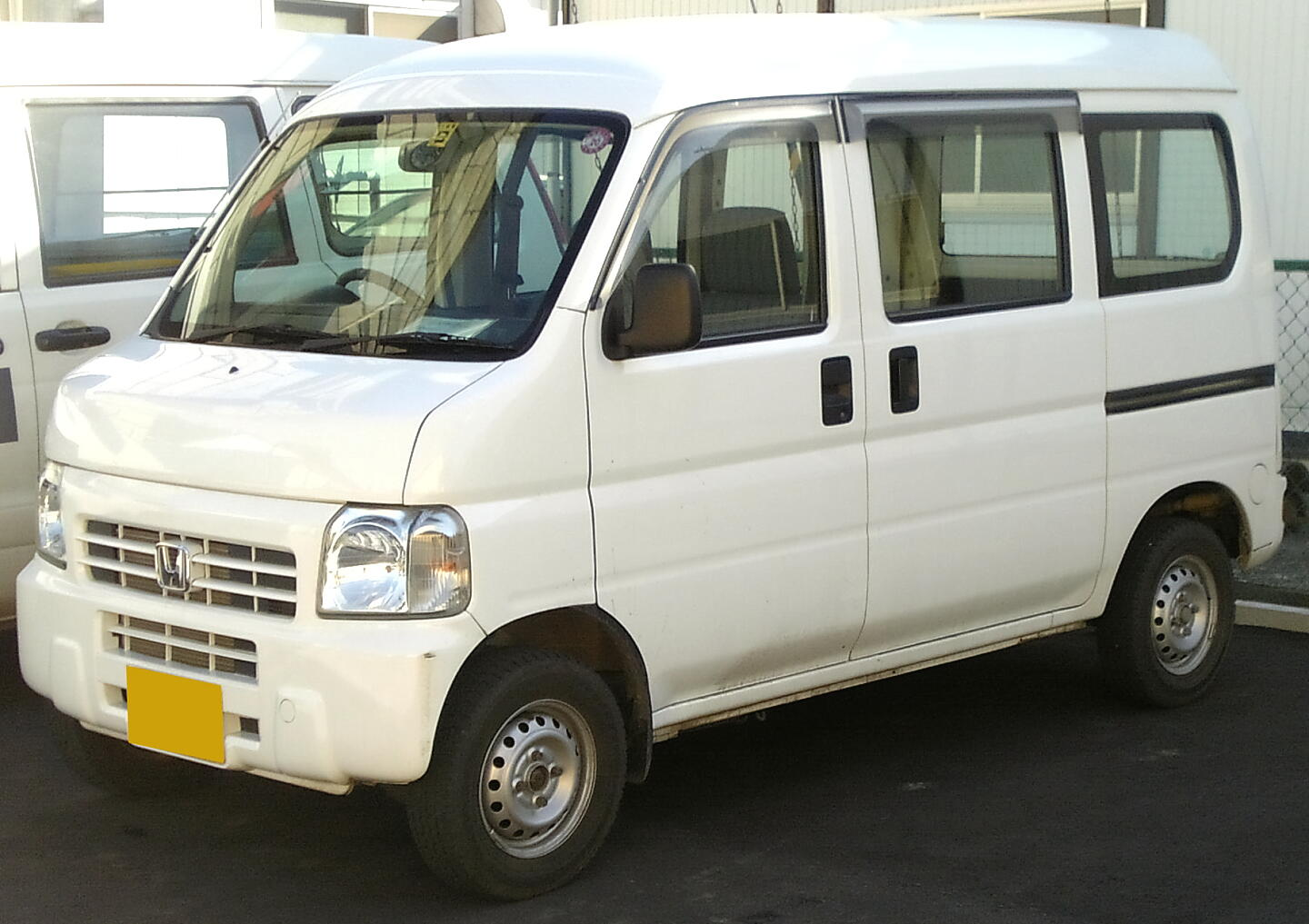
Honda Acty van

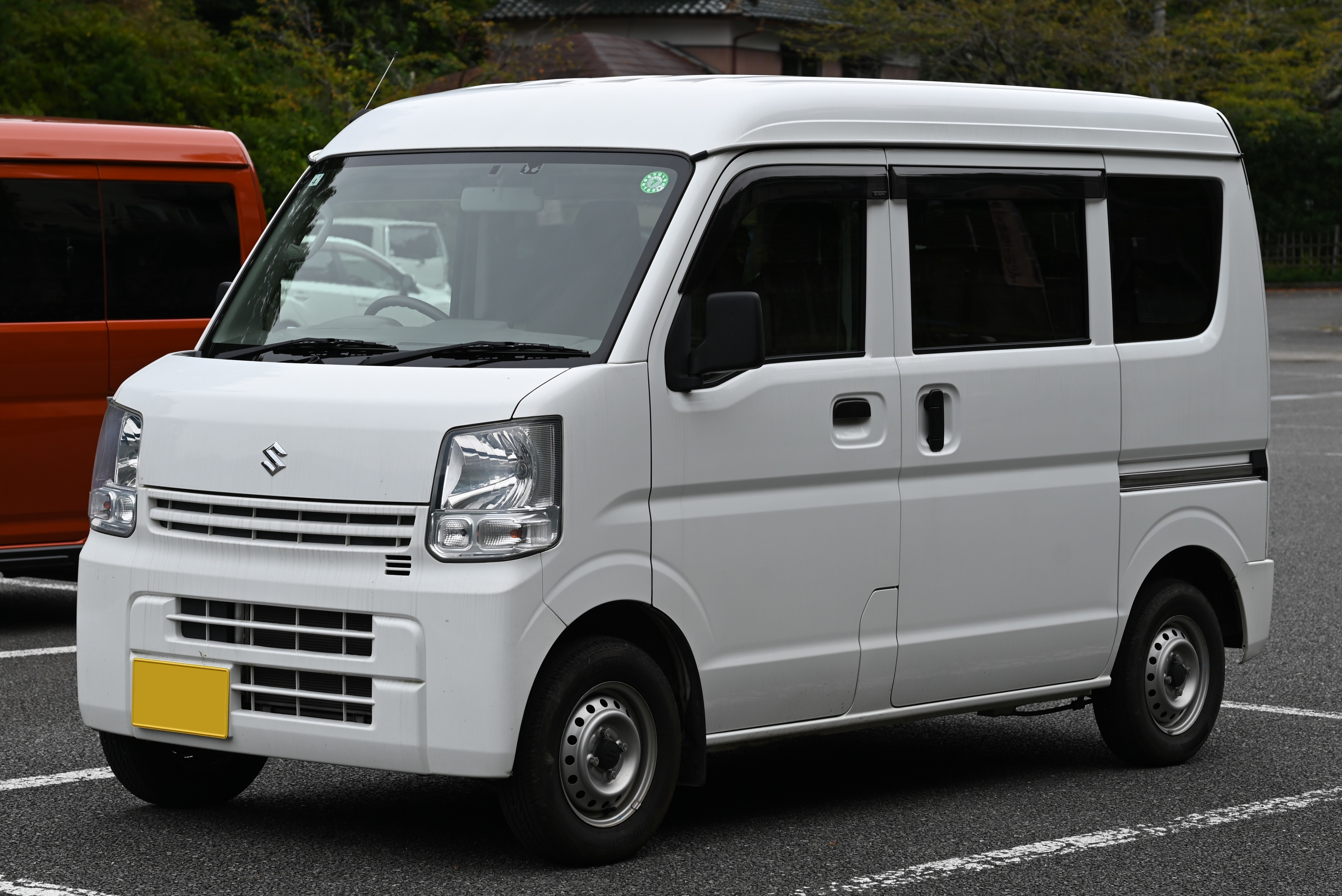
Suzuki Every

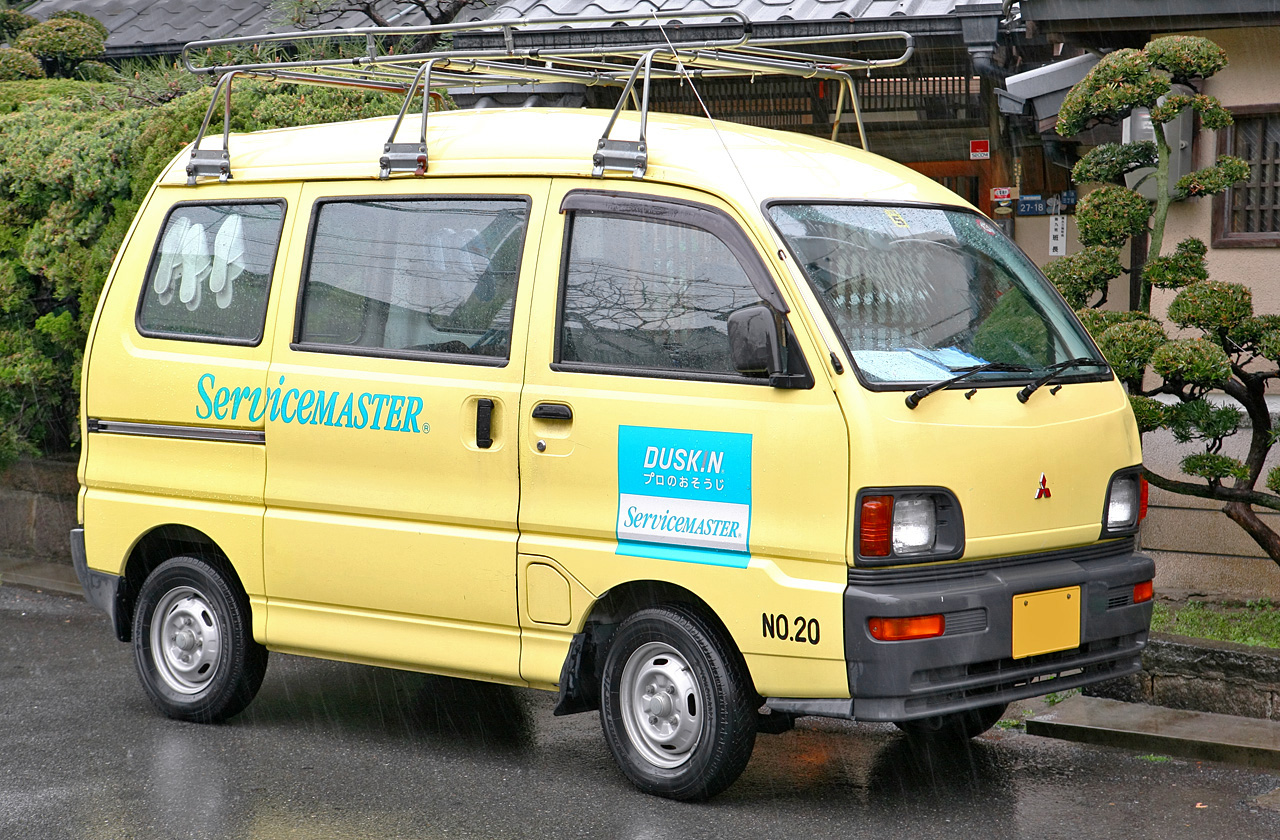
Mitsubishi Minicab van

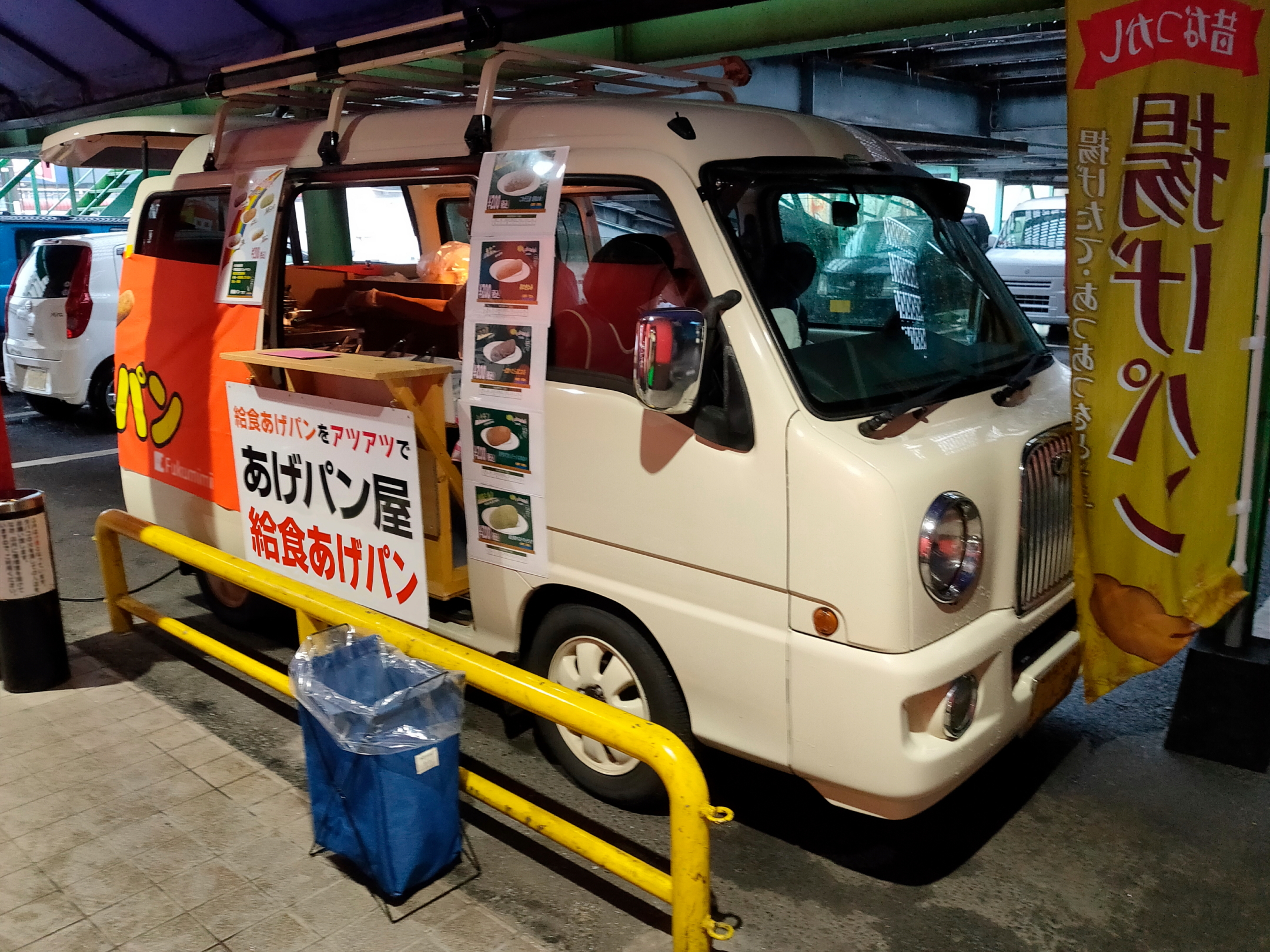
Subaru Dias Wagon Classic food truck

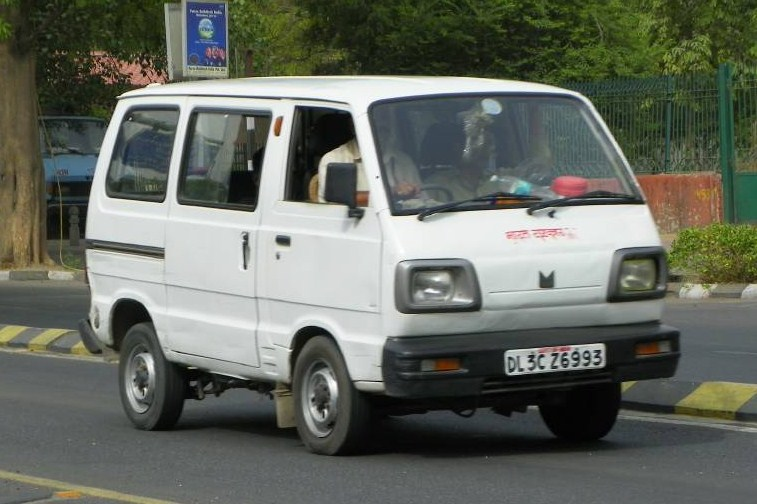
Maruti Suzuki Omni, Indian licensed version of the Suzuki Carry

=== Non-kei microvans ===
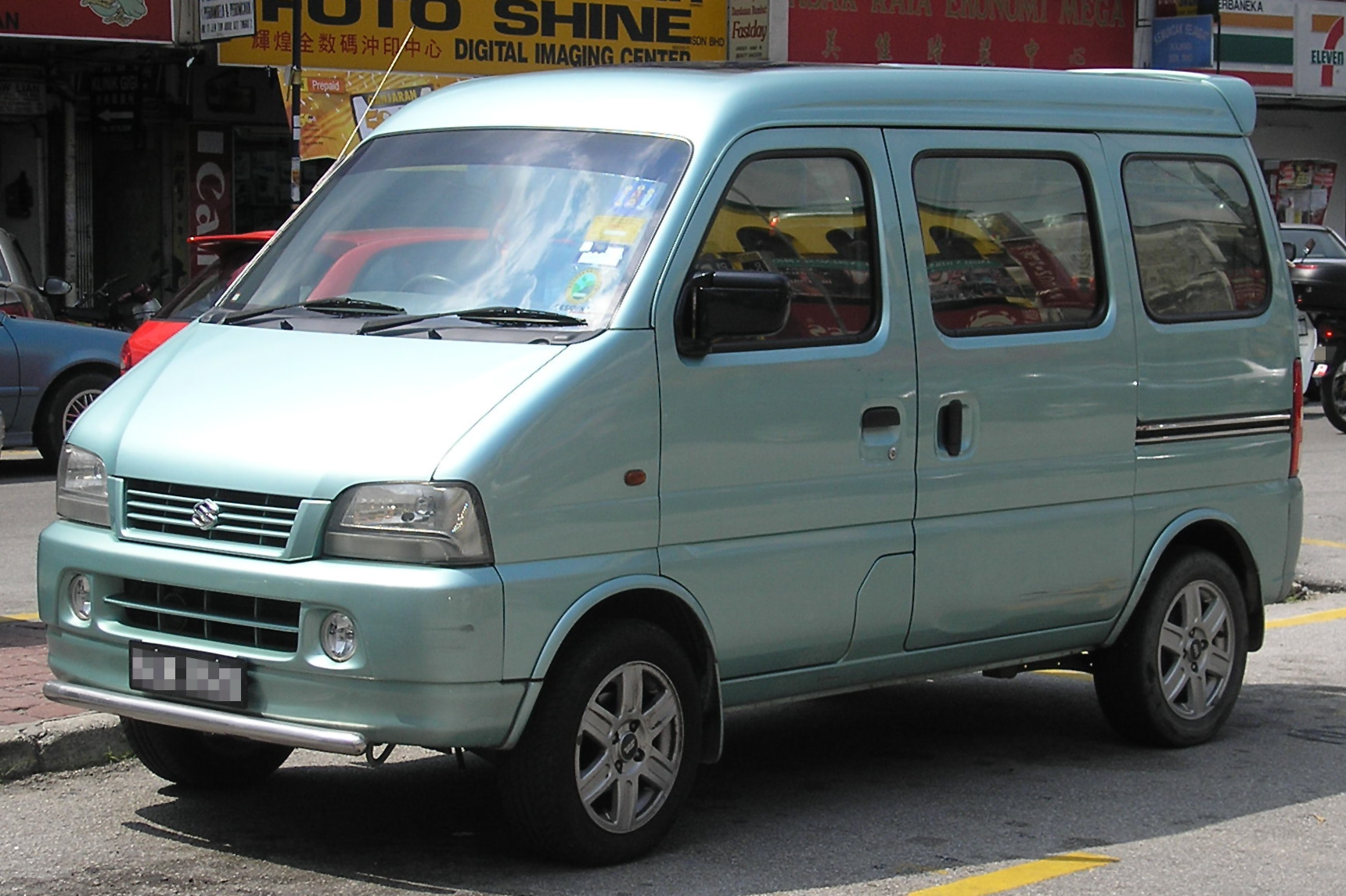
Suzuki Every Landy/E-RV or Maruti Versa

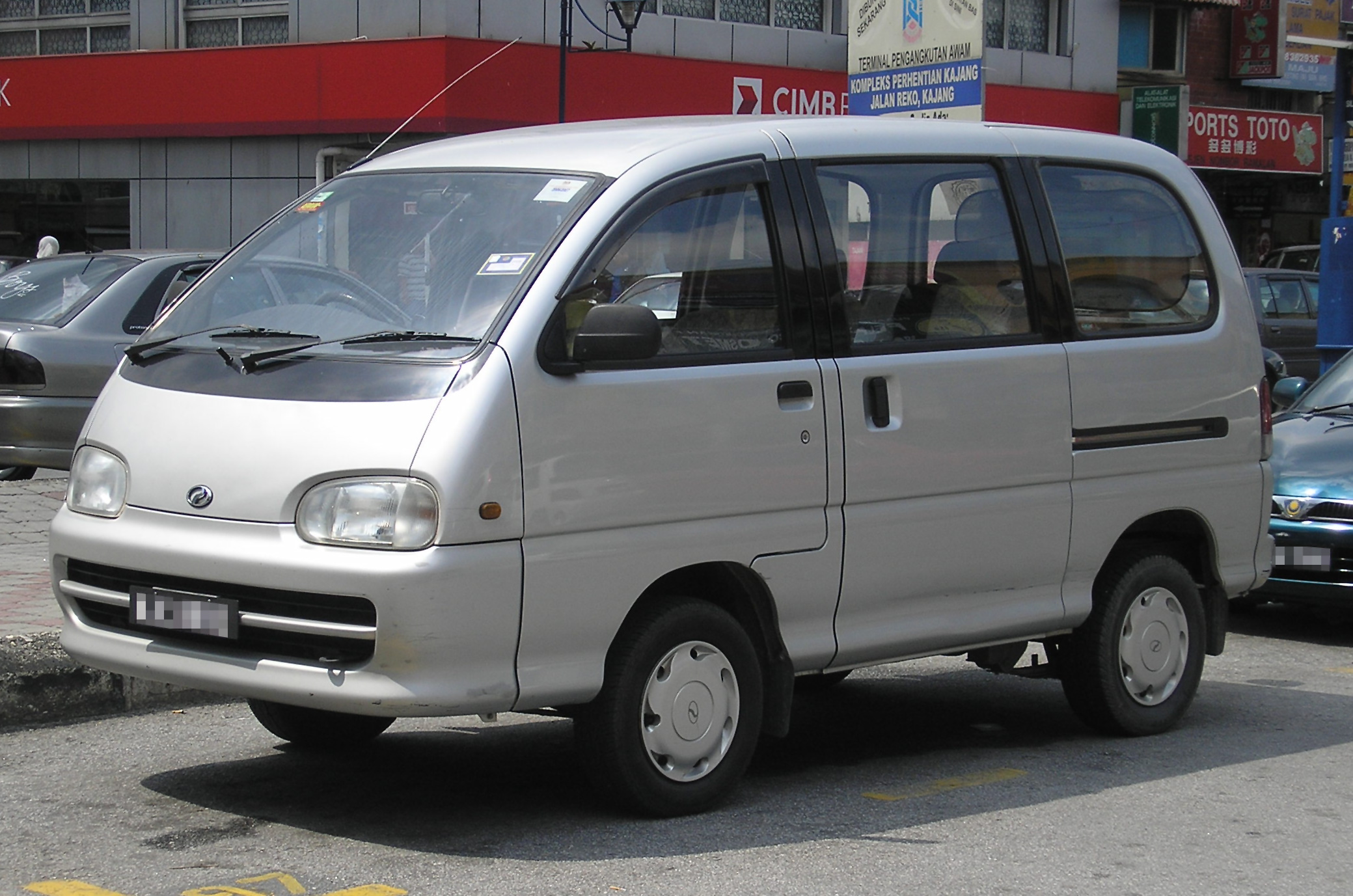
Perodua Rusa, based on the Daihatsu Zebra

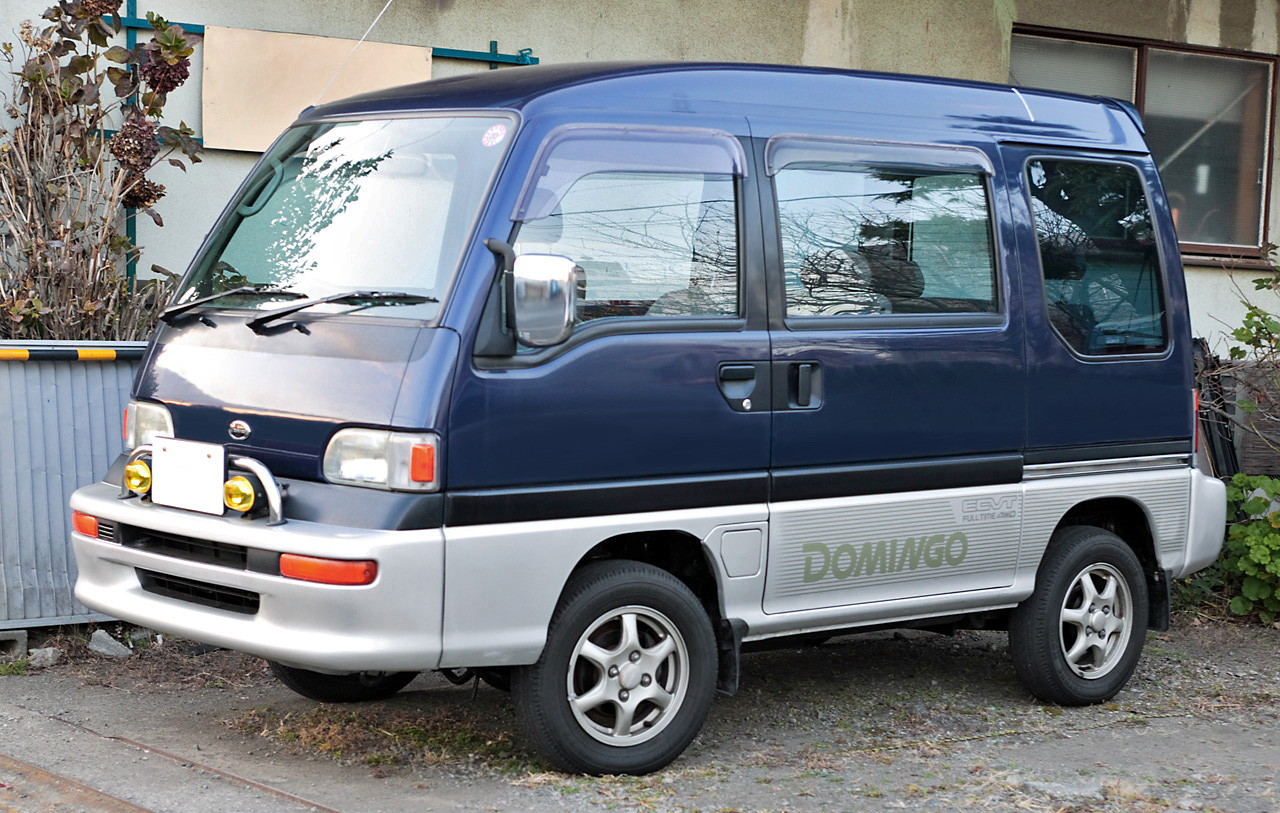
Subaru Domingo

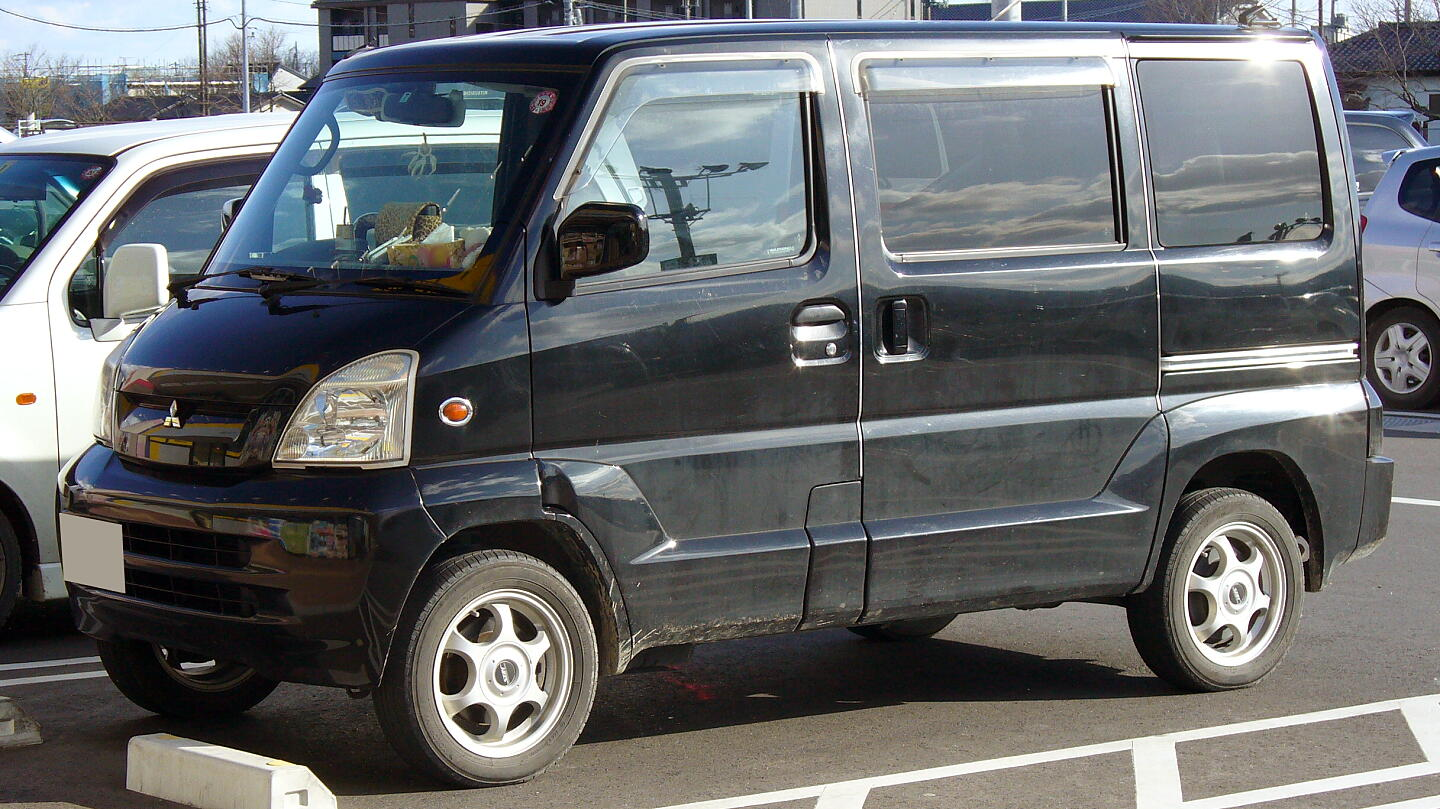
Mitsubishi Town Box Wide

== See also ==
- Compact van
- Neighborhood electric vehicle
- Panel van
- Solar powered vehicle
