= Lalit Kumar Yadav =

Indian politician (born 1966)

Member of Bihar Legislative Assembly
- In office 2010–2022
- Minister: Public Health Engineering Department, Bihar
- Preceded by: Pitambar Paswan
- Constituency: Darbhanga Rural
- In office 2005–2010
- Succeeded by: Constituency abolished
- Constituency: Manigachhi
- In office 2000–2005
- Constituency: Manigachhi
- In office 1995–2000
- Preceded by: Madan Mohan Jha
- Constituency: Manigachhi

Personal details
- Born: 1 January 1966 (age 60) Tardih, Darbhanga, Bihar
- Party: Rashtriya Janata Dal
- Parent: Ganesh Yadav
- Education: Master of Arts
- Occupation: Farmer
- Profession: Politician

Lalit Kumar Yadav is an Indian politician and a member of Bihar Legislative Assembly of India. He represents the Darbhanga Rural constituency in Darbhanga district of Bihar. He was elected in 1995 as a member of Rashtriya Janata Dal.
