= Manigachhi Assembly constituency =

Coordinates: 26°13′05″N 86°08′49″E

Manigachhi
- Former constituency for the Bihar Legislative Assembly

Constituency details
- Country: India
- Region: East India
- State: Bihar
- District: Darbhanga
- Lok Sabha constituency: Darbhanga
- Established: 1977
- Abolished: 2010

Manigachhi Assembly constituency was an assembly constituency in Darbhanga district in the Indian state of Bihar.

As a consequence of the orders of the Delimitation Commission of India, Manigachhi Assembly constituency ceased to exist in 2010.

It was part of Darbhanga Lok Sabha constituency.

== Members of Legislative Assembly ==
Year	Member	Party
1967	Nagendra Jha	Indian National Congress
1972	Nagendra Jha	Indian National Congress
1977	Nagendra Jha	Indian National Congress
1980	Nagendra Jha	Indian National Congress (I)
1985	Madan Mohan Jha	Indian National Congress
1990	Madan Mohan Jha	Indian National Congress
1995	Lalit Kumar Yadav	Janata Dal
2000	Lalit Kumar Yadav	Rashtriya Janata Dal
2005	Prabhakar Choudhary	Janata Dal (United)
2005	Lalit Kumar Yadav	Rashtriya Janata Dal
2010 onwards : Constituency delimited

== Results ==
=== 1977–2005 ===
In the October 2005 state assembly elections, Lalit Kmar Yadav of RJD won the Manigachhi assembly seat defeating his nearest rival Prabhakar Chaudhary of JD(U). Contests in most years were multi cornered but only winners and runners are being mentioned. Prabhakar Chaudhary of JD(U) defeated Lalit Kumar Yadav of RJD in February 2009. Lalit Kumar Yadav of RJD/ JD defeated Dr. Madan Mohan Jha of Congress in 2000 and 1995. Madan Mohan Jha of Congress defeated Ashok Kumar of JD in 1990 and Ramakant Choudhary of JP in 1985. Nagendra Jha of Congress defeated Indrakant Jha of Janata Party (Secular – Charan Singh)/JP in 1980 and 1977.
