= Jagdish Khattar =

Indian businessman (1942–2021)

- Born: 18 December 1942; Dera Ismail Khan, British India
- Died: 26 April 2021 (aged 78)
- Education: University of Delhi
- Occupation: Businessman
- Children: 1

Jagdish Khattar (18 December 1942 – 26 April 2021) was an Indian businessman and civil servant. He was the managing director of Maruti Udyog Limited from 1999 to 2007. He first joined Maruti in July 1993 as a director (marketing). He was appointed managing director in 1999 as the government nominee, and reappointed in May 2002 as the Suzuki Motor Corporation (SMC) nominee. During his tenure, he oversaw a restructuring of the company in the face of foreign competitors entering the Indian market.

Prior to joining Maruti, Khattar was an officer of the Indian Administrative Service for more than 27 years. In 2008, he decided to set up an independent national sales and service network in the automobile sector, which became Carnation Auto.

== Early life ==
Khattar was born on 18 December 1942 into a family of entrepreneurs who had set up an electricity generation and supply company in Dera Ismail Khan (now in Pakistan) before Partition. He completed his Bachelor of Arts (Honours) degree from St. Stephen's College, Delhi and his LLB from Delhi University.

== Career ==
Khattar was an Indian Administrative Service (IAS) officer of the Uttar Pradesh cadre. As a bureaucrat he served as the officer of the Uttar Pradesh state government between 1965 and 1979, during which he served as the district magistrate of Chamoli between 1969 and 1972, and the managing director of the Uttar Pradesh State Industrial Development Corporation between 1975 and 1978. He was the director of the Tea Board of India in London between 1979 and 1983. He was with the Ministry of Commerce as the chairman of the Tea Board between 1983 and 1984 and served as the chairman and managing director of the Uttar Pradesh State Cement Corporation between 1984 and 1986, and as the secretary and chairman of the Uttar Pradesh Road Transport Corporation between 1986 and 1988. He went on to be the joint secretary at the Ministry of Steel with the Government of India between 1988 and 1992.

He was brought in as an Officer on Special Duty to Maruti Udyog in 1992 by the then managing director R. C. Bhargava. He joined the company in 1993 as a director of marketing and went on to become its executive director before being promoted to being its joint managing director in 1999. This was the time of differences between Suzuki Motor Corporation and the Government of India which were joint venture partners in the company. He was noted to have laid the foundation of the company's growth after the Indian government began its disinvestment from the joint venture in 2002. During this period of disagreement between the venture partners, Khattar dealt with issues on ownership, technology transfer, as well as industrial relations including a workers strike in the Gurgaon plant of the company in 2000. In 2002, he was re-nominated as the managing director by Suzuki Motor Corporation and served as the managing director until his retirement in 2007. At the time of his retirement, the company had more than fifty percent of the market share of the Indian passenger vehicles market. He was also noted for his representations of the Indian auto industry for changes in taxation structure and regulations with the government, working with the Society of Indian Automobile Manufacturers (SIAM).

His last day in office at Maruti as MD, at age 65, was on 18 December 2007. After his retirement from Maruti Udyog in 2007, he founded Carnation Auto, a multi-brand car service chain with investments from Premji Invest and Gaja Capital. He was charged by the CBI and Carnation Auto in 2019 of causing losses of INR 110 crores to the Indian public sector bank, Punjab National Bank. However, an independent forensic audit found no evidence of wrongdoings.

== Death ==
Khattar died on 26 April 2021 from a cardiac arrest. He was aged 78.

== Recognition and awards ==
Khattar had an honorary Doctor of Business Administration award from the London Metropolitan University for his services to the automobile industry. In addition, some of his managerial awards included:

- Ernst and Young – Manager Entrepreneur of the Year 2003
- National HRD Network – Pathfinder CEO of the Year 2006
- CNBC – Auto Car Man of the Year 2008
- NDTV Profit – Auto Man of the Year 2008
- J.D. Power & Associates – Founder's Award 2008

== Industry and government assignments ==
- President, Society of Indian Automobile Manufacturers
- President, Automotive Research Association of India (ARAI)
- Member of Empowered Committee on National Automotive Testing and R & D Infrastructure (NATRIP)
- Member, Environment Pollution (Prevention and Control) Authority for the National Capital Region set up by the Supreme Court of India
- Member of the Committee constituted by Ministry of Defence, Government of India, to look into streamlining of systems for procurement of specific items
- Chairman, sub-committee for restructuring of Defence undertakings & ordnance factories.
