= Maruti Suzuki =

Indian automobile manufacturer

Maruti Suzuki India Limited
- Formerly: Maruti Udyog Limited
- Type: Public subsidiary
- Traded as: BSE: 532500; NSE: MARUTI; BSE SENSEX Constituent; NSE NIFTY 50 Constituent
- ISIN: INE585B01010
- Industry: Automotive
- Founded: 24 February 1981; 45 years ago
- Founder: Government of India
- Headquarters: New Delhi, India
- Area served: India
- Key people: R. C. Bhargava (chairman); Hisashi Takeuchi (Managing Director & CEO); Kenichi Ayukawa (Executive Vice Chairman); Shasank Srivastava (Executive Director)
- Products: Automobiles; Commercial vehicles; Automotive parts
- Production output: ▲2,422,713 units (2026)~100% capacity utilisation
- Services: Automotive finance; Vehicle service
- Revenue: ▲₹187,673 crore (US$20 billion) (2026)
- Operating income: ▲₹19,118 crore (US$2.0 billion) (2026)
- Net income: ▲₹14,679 crore (US$1.6 billion) (2026)
- Total assets: ▲₹148,881 crore (US$16 billion) (2026)
- Total equity: ▲₹107,156 crore (US$11 billion) (2026)
- Number of employees: 40,004 (including 21,776 non permanent) (2024)
- Parent: Suzuki Motor Corporation
- Website: www.marutisuzuki.com

Maruti Suzuki India Limited is the Indian subsidiary of Japanese automaker Suzuki Motor Corporation. It is the largest automobile manufacturer in India, specializing in small cars. As of 2025, the company had a market capitalization of approximately US$50-55 billion. The company was established by the Government of India as Maruti Udyog Limited in February 1981 as a joint venture with Suzuki, the latter becoming the first Japanese automaker, as well as the first major foreign automaker, to invest in India.

Maruti opened its first production facility in Gurugram, Haryana, in 1982. Initially, Maruti was majority-owned by the Indian government, with Suzuki only taking a 26% stake during its establishment in 1982. The Indian government gradually reduced its stake, partially departed the business in 2003 by making it a public company and then sold all of its remaining shares to Suzuki Motor Corporation in 2007.

Maruti Suzuki has emerged as the largest Suzuki subsidiary in terms of production volume and sales. As of September 2022, the company had a leading market share of 42% in the Indian passenger car market.

== History ==
=== Pre-Suzuki affiliation ===
The Maruti name can be traced back to a previous company that was established by the third Indian Prime Minister Indira Gandhi's son, Sanjay Gandhi. In the early 1970s, the Indian government initiated the search for a small car manufacturer. At that time, India had already been manufacturing cars for several years, and the idea of a more affordable "people's car" had been discussed since the 1950s.

Sanjay Gandhi, known for his passion for cars, apprenticed with Rolls-Royce in Crewe of UK for three years. Upon his return in 1968, he recognized the potential of small car production in the private sector. Both the government and the Planning Commission endorsed the concept. Sanjay Gandhi subsequently initiated his automotive project, establishing operations in a rented garage near Roshanara Bagh in Old Delhi.

The government issued a letter of intent in September 1970, with plan to produce up to 50,000 cars in a year. In August 1971, Maruti Motors Limited was established with Sanjay Gandhi becoming its first managing director. He acquired 297 acres of land in Gurgaon at a cost of approximately Rs 12,000 per acre to establish his Maruti factory. Initially, plans were laid out to manufacture an indigenous car priced at around Rs 8,000. However, the cost of the vehicle escalated to approximately Rs 16,500 (ex-showroom) and about Rs 21,000 on the road in Haryana. Despite the increase in price, the Maruti car remained competitively priced, being Rs 5,000-10,000 cheaper than its counterparts.

The first prototype of the Maruti car was completed in 1972, with production anticipated to commence by April 1973, as promised by Sanjay Gandhi. He made the chassis by himself at his workshop, and a Triumph motorcycle engine was used to propel the car. the prototype car underwent a feasibility test by the Vehicle Research & Development Establishment in Ahmednagar. The prototype failed the test, being deemed unsuitable for road use. Nonetheless, in July 1974, Maruti was granted an industrial license to produce 50,000 cars. However, the actual production output at Sanjay Gandhi's factory fell short of the initial target. Despite the projection to commence production at a rate of 12-20 units per month and escalate to 200 units per day, only 21 units were manufactured by 31 March 1976.

Sanjay Gandhi's involvement in politics during the Emergency further complicated the project's progress. Following Indira Gandhi's defeat in the 1977 election and a court order for Maruti's dissolution in 1978, the project faced uncertain prospects. With Indira's return to office in 1980 and Sanjay's death in a plane crash, the Government of India intervened and assumed control of Maruti through legislative measures.

=== Tie-up with Suzuki ===
Logo of Maruti Udyog

Following Sanjay's death, his mother Indira tasked Arun Nehru with evaluating the feasibility of resurrecting her son's vision to develop India's affordable car. Nehru acknowledged the project's potential but emphasized the need for expertise from an experienced manufacturer. Subsequently, a team was assembled to explore potential collaborations with manufacturers globally. The Indian government started engaging in negotiations with Suzuki in April 1982. Following several months of preparations, Suzuki of Japan and Maruti Udyog Ltd. signed a license and joint venture agreement in October 1982. Initially, Suzuki acquired a modest 26 percent stake in the joint venture, owing to their constrained capital and perceived risks, despite the Indian government's preference for Suzuki to take a 40 percent foreign equity share. Both parties reached a consensus, stipulating that Suzuki would increase its stake to 40 percent after five years. Both the venture partners also entered into an agreement to nominate their candidate for the post of managing director and every managing director would have a tenure of five years. Suzuki later increased its equity to 50% in 1992, and further to 56.21% as of 2013.

Maruti was granted permission to import two Suzuki vehicles that were completely assembled in the first two years of India's closed market, with an initial target of using just 33% domestic components. This greatly displeased the nearby manufacturers. There were some concerns that the Indian market would not support Maruti Suzuki's relatively high production levels, and the government even considered changing the petrol tariff and decreasing the excise fee to increase sales.

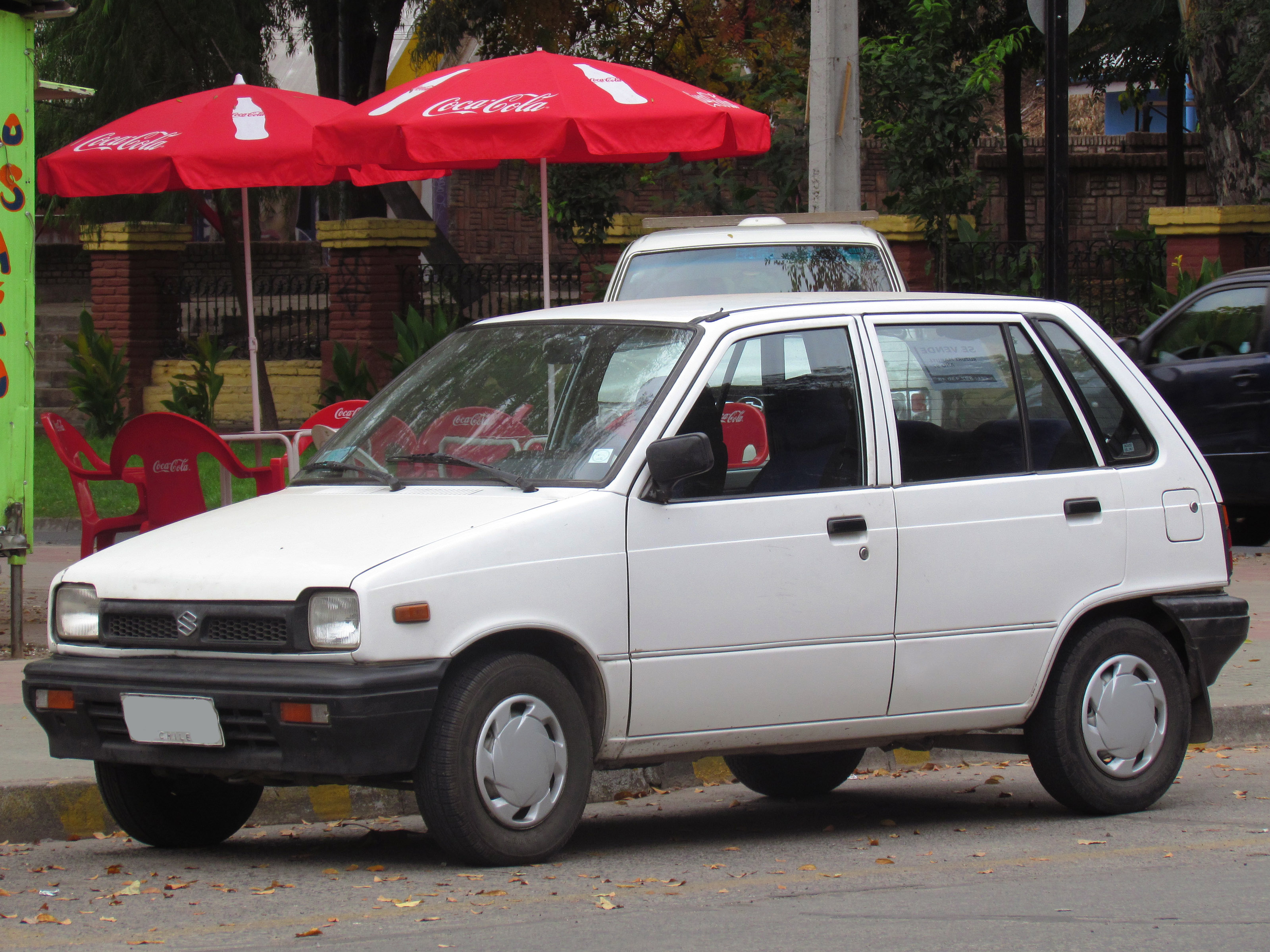
A 1996 Maruti 800 photographed in Chile

Local production commenced in December 1983 with the introduction of the SS30/SS40 Suzuki Fronte/Alto-based Maruti 800. In 1984, the Maruti Van with the same three-cylinder engine as the 800 was released. Maruti targeted annual production of 20,000 cars in the first year, and 40,000 in the second year at the Gurgaon plant. However, the rapid success of Maruti exceeded expectations of Suzuki. Within the first year, the company received an 120,000 bookings, much to Suzuki's surprise. Despite facing overwhelming demand, Maruti encountered challenges in meeting orders due to capacity limitations. The surge in demand necessitated a complete overhaul of its production strategy, by adjusting the ratio between the 800 and the van.

The Suzuki SJ410-based Gypsy, a 970 cc 4-wheel drive off-road vehicle, was introduced in 1985. The 100,000th car manufactured by the firm was the 796 cc hatchback Suzuki Alto (SS80), which succeeded the original 800 in 1986. In 1987, the company started exporting to western markets, when a lot of 500 cars were sent to Hungary. By 1988, the capacity of the Gurgaon plant was increased to 100,000 units per annum.

Until 1992–1993, Maruti faced constraints in increasing capacity due to the need for foreign exchange. Moreover, securing funding for expansion was challenging, especially during the Indian economic crisis of 1991. The Indian government stipulated that expansion could only proceed with foreign loans to cover costs. Eventually, Maruti secured aid from Axiom Bank in Japan, allowing them to finance the foreign exchange component of their expansion. This enabled Maruti to establish a new production line in the Gurgaon plant, addressing the persistent issue of shortages.

In 1989, the Maruti 1000 was introduced and the 970 cc, three-box was India's first contemporary sedan. By 1991, 65 percent of the components, for all vehicles produced, were indigenized. After the liberalization of the Indian economy in 1991, Suzuki increased its stake in Maruti to 50 percent, making the company a 50-50 joint venture with the government of India as the other stakeholder.

In 1993, the Zen, a 993 cc engine hatchback was launched, and in 1994 the 1,298 cc Esteem sedan was introduced. Maruti produced its 1 millionth vehicle since the commencement of production in 1994. Maruti's second plant was opened with an annual capacity reaching 200,000 units. Maruti launched a 24-hour emergency on-road vehicle service. In 1998, the new Maruti 800 was released, being the first change in design since 1986. Zen D, a 1,527 cc diesel hatchback, Maruti's first diesel vehicle, and a redesigned Omni were introduced. In 1999, the 1.6-litre Maruti Baleno three-box sedan and Wagon R were also launched.

In 2000, Maruti became the first car company in India to launch a call center for internal and customer services. The new Alto model was released. In 2001, Maruti True Value, selling and buying used cars was launched. In October of the same year, the Maruti Versa was launched. In 2002, Esteem Diesel was introduced. Two new subsidiaries were also started: Maruti Insurance Distributor Services and Maruti Insurance Brokers Limited. Suzuki Motor Corporation increased its stake in Maruti to 54.2 percent.

In 2003, the new Suzuki Grand Vitara XL-7 was introduced while the Zen and the Wagon R were upgraded and redesigned. The four millionth Maruti vehicle was built and they entered into a partnership with the State Bank of India. Maruti Udyog Ltd. was listed on BSE and NSE after a public issue, which was oversubscribed tenfold. In 2004, the Alto became India's best-selling car overtaking the Maruti 800 after nearly two decades. The five-seater Versa 5-seater, a new variant, was created while the Esteem was re-launched. Maruti Udyog closed the financial year 2003–04 with an annual sale of 472,122 units, the highest ever since the company began operations, and the fiftieth lakh (5 millionth) car rolled out in April 2005. The 1.3-litre Suzuki Swift five-door hatchback was introduced in 2005.

Maruti Suzuki's former logo, used in 2009-2018

In 2006, Suzuki and Maruti set up another joint venture called Maruti Suzuki Automobiles India to build two new manufacturing plants, one for vehicles and one for engines. Cleaner cars were also introduced, with several new models meeting the new Bharat Stage III emission standards. In February 2012, Maruti Suzuki sold its ten millionth vehicle in India. In July 2014 it had a market share of more than 45%. In May 2015, the company produced its fifteen millionth vehicle in India, a Swift Dzire.

On 25 April 2019, Maruti Suzuki announced that it would phase out production of diesel cars by 1 April 2020, when the Bharat Stage VI emission standards come into effect. The new standards would require a significant investment from the company to upgrade its existing diesel engines to comply with the more stringent emission standards. Chairman R.C. Bhargava stated, "We have taken this decision so that in 2022 we are able to meet the corporate average fuel efficiency (CAFE) norms and a higher share of CNG vehicles will help us comply with the norms. I hope the union government's policies will help grow the market for CNG vehicles." At that time, diesel cars accounted for about 23 percent of Maruti Suzuki's annual sales.

The company planned to launch its first electric car in the second half of 2021, the Maruti Suzuki Wagon R Electric, before cancelling its plan. The company now produces the eVitara (unveiled in Milan and based on eVX concept shown in 2023) since 2025.

== Leadership ==
- Sanjay Gandhi (1971–1977)
- R. C. Bhargava (1981–1997)
- S. S. L. N. Bhaskarudu (1997–1999)
- Jagdish Khattar (1999–2007)
- Shinzo Nakanishi (2007–2013)
- Kenichi Ayukawa (2013–2022)
- Hisashi Takeuchi (2022–present)

== Manufacturing facilities ==
Maruti Suzuki has two manufacturing facilities in Haryana (Gurugram and Manesar), and one manufacturing complex in Gujarat. All manufacturing facilities have a combined production capacity of 2,250,000 vehicles annually.

The Gurugram manufacturing facility has three fully integrated manufacturing plants and is spread over 300 acres (1.2 km^{2}). The Gurugram facilities also manufacture 240,000 K-Series engines annually. The Gurugram facility manufactures the Alto 800, Wagon R, Ertiga, XL6, S-Cross, Vitara Brezza, Ignis, and Eeco. The Gurugram facility also assembles the Jimny starting from January 2021 solely for export markets. It was reported the Indian-assembled Jimny will be exported to African markets and countries in the Middle East.

The Manesar manufacturing plant was inaugurated in February 2007 and is spread over 600 acres (2.4 km^{2}). Initially, it had a production capacity of 100,000 vehicles annually but this was increased to 300,000 vehicles annually in October 2008. The production capacity was further increased by 250,000 vehicles taking the total production capacity to 800,000 vehicles annually. The Manesar plant produces the Alto, Swift, Ciaz, Baleno and Celerio. On 25 June 2012, Haryana State Industries and Infrastructure Development Corporation demanded Maruti Suzuki pay an additional ₹235 crore for enhanced land acquisition for its Haryana plant expansion. The agency reminded Maruti that failure to pay the amount would lead to further proceedings and vacating the enhanced land acquisition.

In 2012, the company decided to merge Suzuki Powertrain India Limited (SPIL) with itself. SPIL was started as a JV by Suzuki Motor Corp. along with Maruti Suzuki. It has the facilities available for manufacturing diesel engines and transmissions. The demand for transmissions for all Maruti Suzuki cars is met by the production from SPIL.

In 2017, the new Suzuki Motor Gujarat facility was opened. This third facility is not owned by Maruti Suzuki, but instead wholly owned by Suzuki Motor Corporation. Despite that, the plant supplied vehicles to Maruti without any additional cost. Located in Hansalpur, Ahmedabad, the plant has a total annual capacity of 750,000 units.

In November 2021 Maruti Suzuki announce to set up of a big plant in IMT Kharkhoda in Sonipat district across 900 acres with an investment of ₹18,000 crores.

Haryana State Industrial and Infrastructure Development Corporation gives 900 acres of land to Maruti Suzuki for setting up a new plant in Industrial Model Township at Kharkhoda, Haryana.

In August 2022 Prime Minister of India Narendra Modi virtually laid the foundation stone of Maruti Suzuki's new manufacturing plant in Kharkhoda. It will be one of the largest automobile manufacturing plant in the world with the capacity of making a million cars per year.

The Maruti Suzuki's Gurugram manufacturing facility will shift to new manufacturing facility in Kharkhoda, Haryana will have four manufacturing plants in which a million cars will be produced annually and the Kharkhoda, Haryana plant will be third largest car producing facility in world. Along with this, the carmaker will invest 35,000 crores into building second manufacturing plant close to their Gujarat plant in the state with a million cars capacity per annum. The operations will commence in 2028-29 taking the production capacity combined to 4.35 million units annually.

== Controversies ==
=== Industrial relations ===
Since its founding in 1983, Maruti Udyog Limited has experienced problems with its labor force. The Indian labor it hired readily accepted Japanese work culture and the modern manufacturing process. In 1997, there was a change in ownership, and Maruti became predominantly government controlled. Shortly thereafter, conflict between the United Front Government and Suzuki started. In 2000, a major industrial relations issue began and employees of Maruti went on an indefinite strike, demanding among other things, major revisions to their wages, incentives and pensions.

Employees used slowdown in October 2000, to press a revision to their incentive-linked pay. In parallel, after elections and a new central government led by NDA alliance, India pursued a disinvestment policy. Along with many other government owned companies, the new administration proposed to sell part of its stake in Maruti Suzuki in a public offering. The worker's union opposed this sell-off plan on the grounds that the company will lose a major business advantage of being subsidized by the Government, and the union has better protection while the company remains in control of the government.

The standoff between the union and the management continued through 2001. The management refused union demands citing increased competition and lower margins. The central government privatized Maruti in 2002 and Suzuki became the majority owner of Maruti Udyog Limited.

=== Manesar violence ===
On 18 July 2012, Maruti's Manesar plant was hit by violence. According to Maruti management, the production workers attacked supervisors and started a fire that killed company's General Manager of Human Resources Avineesh Dev and injured 100 other managers, including two Japanese expatriates. The workers also allegedly injured nine policemen. However Maruti Suzuki Workers Union (MSWU) President Sam Meher alleged that management ordered 300 hired security guards to attack the workforce during the violence. The incident is the worst-ever for Suzuki since the company began operations in India in 1983.

Since April 2012, the Manesar union had demanded a three-fold increase in basic salary, a monthly conveyance allowance of ₹10,000, a laundry allowance of ₹3,000, a gift with every new car launch, and a house for every worker who wants one, or cheaper home loans for those who want to build their own houses. According to the Maruti Suzuki Workers Union a supervisor had abused and made discriminatory comments to a low-caste worker, Jiya Lal. These claims were denied by the company and the police. Maruti said the unrest began, not over wage discussions, but after the workers' union demanded the reinstatement of Jiya Lal who had been suspended for allegedly beating a supervisor. The workers claim harsh working conditions and extensive hiring of low-paid contract workers which are paid about $126 a month, about half the minimum wage of permanent employees. On 27 June 2013, an international delegation from the International Commission for Labor Rights (ICLR) released a report alleging serious violations of the industrial right of workers by the Maruti Suzuki management. Company executives denied harsh conditions and claim they hired entry-level workers on contracts and made them permanent as they gained experience. Maruti employees currently earn allowances in addition to their base wage.

The police, in its First Information Report (FIR), claimed on 21 July that Manesar violence is the result of a planned violence by a section of workers and union leaders and arrested 91 people. Maruti Suzuki in its statement on the unrest, announced that all work at the Manesar plant has been suspended indefinitely. The shut down of Manesar plant is leading to a loss of about ₹75 crore per day. On 21 July 2012, citing safety concerns, the company announced a lockout under The Industrial Disputes Act, 1947 pending results of an inquiry the company has requested of the Haryana government into the causes of the disorder. Under the provisions of The Industrial Disputes Act for wages, the report claimed, employees are expected to be paid for the duration of the lockout. On 26 July 2012, Maruti announced employees would not be paid for the period of lock-out in accordance with Indian labor laws. The company further announced that it will stop using contract workers by March 2013. The report claimed the salary difference between contract workers and permanent workers has been much smaller than initial media reports – the contract worker at Maruti received about ₹11,500 per month, while a permanent worker received about ₹12,500 a month at start, which increased in three years to ₹21,000-₹22,000 per month. In a separate report, a contractor who was providing contract employees to Maruti claimed the company gave its contract employees the best wage, allowances and benefits package in the region.

Shinzo Nakanishi, managing director and chief executive of Maruti Suzuki India, said this type of violence has never happened in Suzuki Motor Corp's global operations in Hungary, Indonesia, Spain, Pakistan, Thailand, Malaysia, China and the Philippines. Nakanishi apologized to affected workers on behalf of the company, and in press interview requested the central and Haryana state governments to help stop further violence by legislating decisive rules to restore corporate confidence amid emergence of this new 'militant workforce' in Indian factories. He announced, "we are going to de-recognize Maruti Suzuki Workers' Union and dismiss all workers named in connection with the incident. We will not compromise at all in such instances of barbaric, unprovoked violence." He also announced Maruti plans to continue manufacturing in Manesar, that Gujarat was an expansion opportunity and not an alternative to Manesar.

The company dismissed 500 workers accused of causing the violence and re-opened the plant on 21 August, saying it would produce 150 vehicles on the first day, less than 10% of its capacity. Analysts said that the shutdown was costing the company 1 billion rupees ($18 million) a day and costing the company market share. In July 2013, the workers went on hunger strike to protest the continuing jailing of their colleagues and launched an online campaign to support their demands.

A total of 148 workers were charged with the murder of Human Resources Manager Avineesh Dev. The court dismissed charges against 117 of the workers. On 17 March 2017, 31 workers were found guilty of variety of offences. 18 were convicted on charges of rioting, trespassing, causing hurt and other related offences under Indian Penal Code sections. The remaining 13 workers were sentenced to life in imprisonment after being found guilty of the murder of General Manager of Human Resources Avineesh Dev. Twelve of the thirteen sentenced were office-bearers of the Maruti Suzuki Workers Union at the time of the alleged offences. The prosecution had sought the death penalty for the thirteen.

Both prosecution and defense have announced they will appeal against the sentences. Defense counsel Vrinda Grover stated, "We will file appeals against all convictions in the HC. The evidence, as it stands, cannot withstand legal scrutiny. There is no evidence to link these workers to the murder. The 13 who have been convicted, it’s important to remember that they were the leaders of the union. Therefore, it is clear that this is targeted framing of these persons. We hope for justice in the superior court".

The Maruti Suzuki Workers Union is continuing to organize industrial action and protests calling for the workers to be released and criticizing the judgement and sentences an unjust. An international appeal for the release of the workers has been made by the International Committee for the Fourth International (ICFI) and other organizations such as the People's Alliance for Democracy and Secularism (PADS).

=== Automotive safety ===
Maruti Suzuki has been criticized for compromising safety in their products by automotive enthusiasts, journalists, and the Global NCAP, as they are made lighter in terms of kerb weight to achieving higher fuel economy. Starting from January 2014, several of their made for India cars were crash tested at Global NCAP through the Safer Cars for India campaign, most of which have given disappointing results. Cars like Alto, Swift, Celerio, S-Presso (with driver's airbag), and Eeco which had no safety features like airbags were awarded 0 stars, while Wagon-R and Swift (2018 model year) which had dual front airbags were awarded 2 stars out of 5. Only the Vitara, Brezza (4 stars) and Ertiga (3 stars) have been awarded decent safety ratings. Though Maruti Suzuki claimed that they were following the safety standards mandated by the Government of India, it however only implied with the safety features included in their cars and not the strong body shell or build quality which suffers the impact of the crash. Maruti Suzuki has also come under fire for discrimination with customers in India, by making cars safe meant for exports to European and African markets.

In November 2014, RC Bhargava, the chairman of Maruti Suzuki, stated that "If carmakers incorporate such features in even entry-level cars, obviously the price would go up, which would lead consumers to opt for two-wheelers, which would be more unsafe", which attracted criticism. The company, in February 2020, decided not to send their cars to Global NCAP for testing, as they only believe in the Safety Standards set by the Government of India. Following the crash test results of S-Presso, Alejandro Furas, Secretary General of Global NCAP said, “It is very disappointing that Maruti Suzuki, the manufacturer with the largest share of the Indian market, offers such low safety performance for Indian consumers. Domestic manufacturers like Mahindra and Tata have demonstrated high levels of safety and protection for their customers, both achieving five star performance. Surely it’s time for Maruti Suzuki to demonstrate this commitment to safety for its customers?” Alongside, David Ward, President of the Towards Zero Foundation said, "We have seen important progress on car safety in India, with new legislation introduced by the government and manufacturers like Mahindra and Tata accepting the Global NCAP five star challenge and producing models which go well beyond minimum regulatory requirements. There is no place for zero rated cars in the Indian market. It remains a great disappointment that an important manufacturer like Maruti Suzuki does not recognize this."

For FY 2022 and 2023, Global NCAP crash tested the Swift, S-Presso, Ignis, and Wagon-R, each of which received 1-star rating, while the Alto K10 received 2-star rating. While these cars came with basic safety features such as ABS and Dual Front Airbags, as mandated by the Government of India, the body structure was rated unstable with inability to withstand further loads. Maruti Suzuki has faced ire by auto enthusiasts and media for prioritizing sales over safety by pricing the unsafe cars much lower than competitors, eventually earning the name "Tin Cans" for the unsafe cars. Furthermore, RC Bhargava, at a BusinessToday event, stated that crash testing at Bharat NCAP should not be made mandatory, sparking a backlask.

By 2023, consumer surveys indicated a shift in car-buying priorities in India, with 92% of respondents reporting that they preferred safer cars over more fuel-efficient ones. Responding to this growing emphasis on vehicle safety, Maruti Suzuki implemented a strategic shift in 2024, standardizing six airbags and electronic stability control across much of its lineup. This approach culminated in the compact sedan Dzire earning a 5-star rating from both Global NCAP and Bharat NCAP, marking a turning point in the company’s safety performance and setting a new benchmark for mass-market Indian sedans.

=== Anti-competitive dealer policies ===
In Aug 2021, Maruti Suzuki was fined ₹200 Crore (US$28.57 million) by the Competition Commission of India (CCI) for implementing its Discount Control Policy that restrains dealers from offering customer discounts beyond those prescribed by the carmaker.

== Models ==
=== Current models ===
Maruti Suzuki is one of India's largest passenger-vehicle manufacturers, offering cars across hatchback, sedan, SUV, MPV and electric-vehicle segments. As of September 2026, its Indian portfolio includes models sold through the Arena and NEXA retail networks. The Arena range includes Alto K10, S-Presso, Celerio, WagonR, Swift, Dzire, Brezza, Ertiga and Victoris, while NEXA offers models including Baleno, Fronx, Grand Vitara, XL6, Jimny, Invicto and e VITARA.

The 2026 Baleno facelift, launched in September, has brought renewed attention to the brand with a new engine, Level 2 ADAS and additional comfort features. The Brezza and Victoris are also attracting strong demand, while the e VITARA represents Maruti Suzuki's expansion into electric mobility. The 2026 Maruti Suzuki Baleno facelift is available in seven colour options, such as the new Enigmatic Teal Green, along with Grandeur Grey, Arctic White, Splendid Silver, Opulent Red, Nexa Blue, and Bluish Black.

==== ICE vehicles ====
Model		First Introduced (India)	Current model		Dealer outlet
Image	Name	First Introduced (India)	Introduced	Facelift update	Dealer outlet
Hatchback
	Alto K10	2000 (as Alto)	2022	—	Arena
	S-Presso	2019	2019	—	Arena
	Celerio	2014	2021	—	Arena
	Wagon R	1999	2019	2022	Arena
	Swift	2005	2024	–	Arena
	Baleno	2015	2022	2026	Nexa
Sedan
	Dzire	2008 (as Swift Dzire)	2024	–	Arena
SUV/Crossover
	Fronx	2023	2023	—	Nexa
	Brezza	2016 (as Vitara Brezza)	2022	2026	Arena
	Victoris	2025	2025	—	Arena
	Grand Vitara	2022	2022	—	Nexa
Off-Road SUV
	Jimny	2023	2023	—	Nexa
MPV
	Ertiga	2012	2018	2022	Arena
	XL6	2019	2019	2022	Nexa
	Invicto	2023	2023	—	Nexa
Van
	Eeco	2010	2010	—	Arena
Pickup truck
	Super Carry	2016	2016	—	Maruti Suzuki Commercial

==== Electric vehicles ====
Model		First Introduced (India)	Current model		Dealer outlet
Image	Name	First Introduced (India)	Introduced	Facelift update	Dealer outlet
SUV/Crossover
	e Vitara	2025	2025	—	Nexa

=== Discontinued models ===
Model	Year Released	Year Discontinued	Image
800	1983	2014	
Omni	1984	2019	
Gypsy E	1985	2000	
Gypsy King	1985	2019	
1000	1990	2000	
Zen	1993	2006	
Esteem	1994	2007	
Baleno	1999	2006	
Baleno Altura	2000	2006	
Versa	2001	2010	
Grand Vitara XL-7 (imported)	2003	2007	
Zen Estilo	2006	2013	
Grand Vitara (imported)	2007	2014	
SX4	2007	2014	
A-star	2008	2014	
Ritz	2009	2017	
Kizashi (imported)	2011	2014	
Ciaz	2014	2025	
S-Cross	2015	2022	
Baleno RS	2017	2020	
Ignis	2017	2026	

== Services ==
=== Sales and service network ===
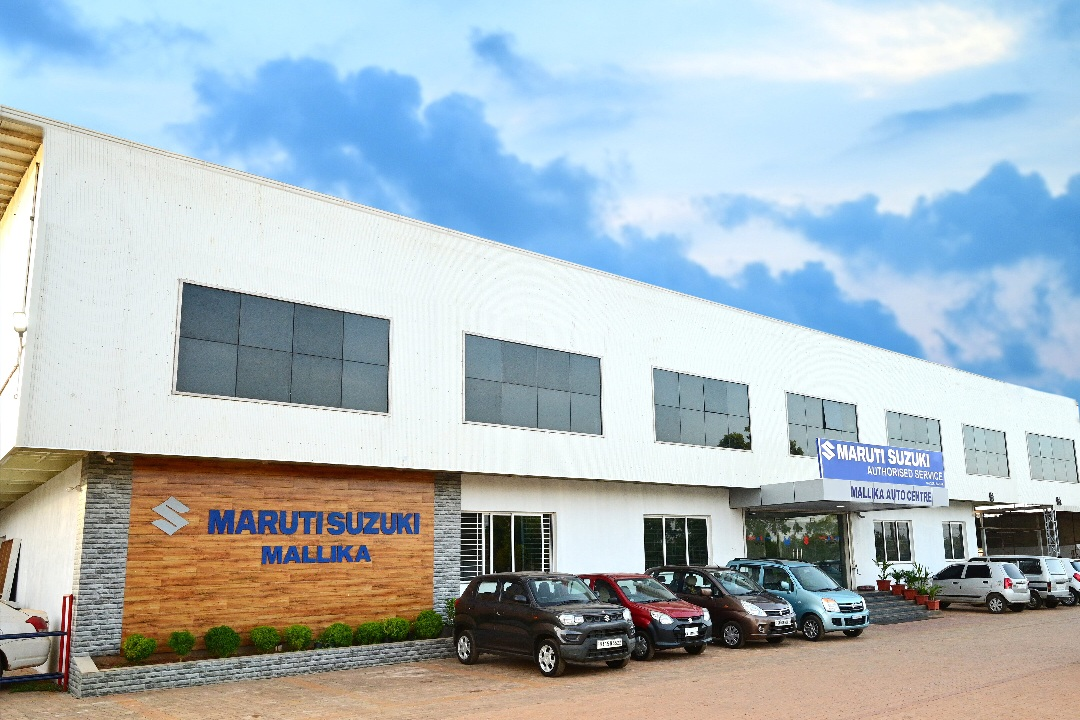
Maruti Suzuki Authorised Service Centre Sagara, Karnataka, India.

As of August 2024, Maruti Suzuki has 2,987 Arena sales outlets across 2,522 cities and 495 Nexa sales outlets across 301 cities in India. The company aims to increase its sales network to 4,000 outlets by 2020. It has 4964 service stations (defined as "touchpoints) across 2,519 cities throughout India, alongside 781 Quick Response Vehicles and 409 mobile workshops. Most of the service stations are managed on franchise basis, where Maruti Suzuki trains the local staff. Also, The Express Service stations exist, sending across their repairman to the vehicle if it is away from a normal service center.

In 2015, Maruti Suzuki launched Nexa, a new dealership network for its premium cars, which stands for New Exclusive Automotive Experience. The network currently sells the Fronx, Baleno, Grand Vitara, XL6, Ciaz, Ignis and Jimny. The S-Cross was the first car to be sold through Nexa outlets. The company recently achieved a milestone of selling 1.5 million cars from over 350 dealerships across the country and is the third largest automobile retail channel of India.

=== Maruti Insurance ===
Launched in 2002 Maruti Suzuki provides vehicle insurance to its customers with the help of the National Insurance Company, Bajaj Allianz, New India Assurance and Royal Sundaram. The service was set up the company with the inception of two subsidiaries Maruti Insurance Distributors Services Pvt. Ltd and Maruti Insurance Brokers Pvt. Limited.

This service started as a benefit or value addition to customers and was able to ramp up easily. By December 2005 they were able to sell more than two million insurance policies since its inception.

=== Maruti Finance ===
To promote its bottom line growth, Maruti Suzuki launched Maruti Finance in January 2002. Prior to the start of this service Maruti Suzuki had started two joint ventures Citicorp Maruti and Maruti Countrywide with Citi Group and GE Countrywide respectively to assist its client in securing loan. Maruti Suzuki tied up with ABN Amro Bank, HDFC Bank, ICICI Limited, Kotak Mahindra, Standard Chartered Bank, and Sundaram to start this venture including its strategic partners in car finance. Again the company entered into a strategic partnership with SBI in March 2003 Since March 2003, Maruti has sold over 12,000 vehicles through SBI-Maruti Finance. SBI-Maruti Finance is currently available in 166 cities across India.

Citicorp Maruti Finance Limited is a joint venture between Citicorp Finance India and Maruti Udyog Limited its primary business stated by the company is "hire-purchase financing of Maruti Suzuki vehicles". Citi Finance India Limited is a wholly owned subsidiary of Citibank Overseas Investment Corporation, Delaware, which in turn is a 100% wholly owned subsidiary of Citibank N.A. Citi Finance India Limited holds 74% of the stake and Maruti Suzuki holds the remaining 26%. GE Capital, HDFC and Maruti Suzuki came together in 1995 to form Maruti Countrywide. Maruti claims that its finance program offers most competitive interest rates to its customers, which are lower by 0.25% to 0.5% from the market rates.

=== Maruti TrueValue ===
Maruti True service offered by Maruti Suzuki to its customers. It is a marketplace for used Maruti Suzuki Vehicles. One can buy, sell or exchange used Maruti or non-Maruti vehicles with the help of this service in India. As of 10 August 2017 there are 1,190 outlets across 936 cities.

=== N2N Fleet Management ===
N2N is the short form of End to End Fleet Management and provides lease and fleet management to corporates. Clients who have signed up of this service include Gas Authority of India Ltd, DuPont, Reckitt Benckiser, Doordarshan, Singer India, National Stock Exchange of India and Transworld. This fleet management service include Leasing, Maintenance, Convenience services and Remarketing.

=== Maruti Accessories ===
Many of the auto component companies, other than Maruti Suzuki, started to offer compatible components and accessories. This caused a serious threat and loss of revenue to Maruti Suzuki. Maruti Suzuki started a new initiative under the brand name Maruti Genuine Accessories to offer accessories like alloy wheels, body cover, carpets, door visors, fog lamps, stereo systems, seat covers and other car care products. These products are sold through dealer outlets and authorized service stations throughout India.

=== Maruti Suzuki Driving School ===
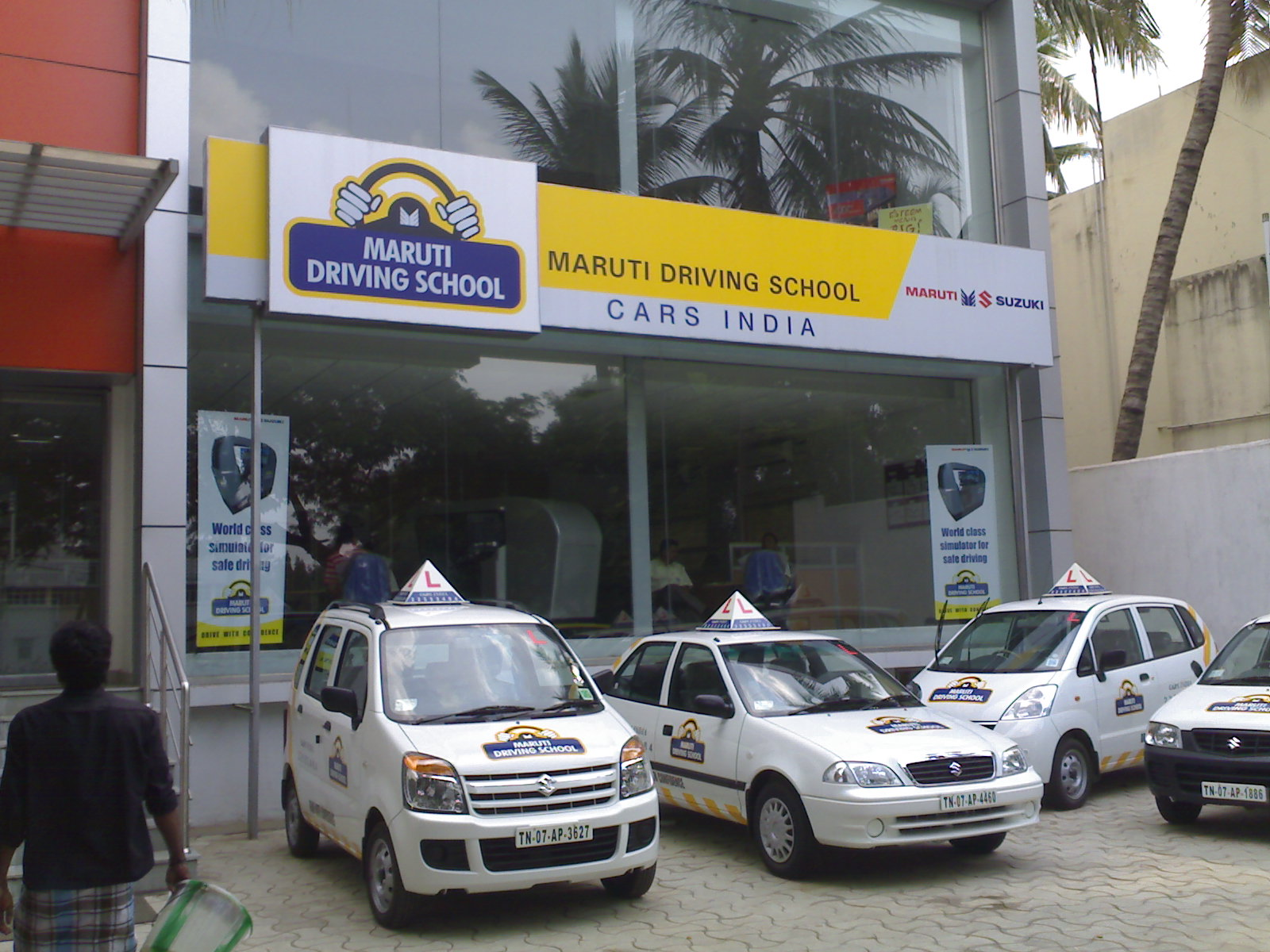
A Maruti Driving School in Chennai

As part of its corporate social responsibility Maruti Suzuki launched the Maruti Driving School in Delhi. Later the services were extended to other cities of India as well. These schools are modelled on international standards, where learners go through classroom and practical sessions. Many international practices like road behavior and attitudes are also taught in these schools. Before driving actual vehicles participants are trained on simulators.

At the launch ceremony for the school Jagdish Khattar stated "We are very concerned about mounting deaths on Indian roads. These can be brought down if government, industry and the voluntary sector work together in an integrated manner. But we felt that Maruti should first do something in this regard and hence this initiative of Maruti Driving Schools."

== Awards and recognition ==
Maruti Suzuki received the Gold Recognition at LACP 2020/21 Vision Award.
