= Madan Mohan Jha =

Indian politician

President of Bihar Pradesh Congress Committee
- In office 17 September 2018 – 5 December 2022
- Preceded by: Kaukab Qadri (In-Charge)
- Succeeded by: Akhilesh Prasad Singh

Member of Bihar Legislative Council
- In office 2014–2026

Minister of Revenue and Land Reforms Government of Bihar
- In office 20 November 2015 – 26 July 2017
- Chief Minister: Nitish Kumar

Member of the Bihar Legislative Assembly for Manigachhi
- In office 1985 – 1995
- Preceded by: Nagendra Jha
- Succeeded by: Lalit Kumar Yadav

Personal details
- Born: 1 August 1956 (age 70)
- Party: Indian National Congress
- Education: MSc; PhD

Madan Mohan Jha is an Indian politician from Darbhanga district of Bihar, India. He was a member of Bihar Legislative Council, second term elected from Teachers Constituency. He is a former president of Bihar Pradesh Congress Committee. He was a member of Bihar Legislative Assembly for Manigachhi from 1985 to 1995.

== Political career ==
Jha contested 1985 Bihar Legislative Assembly election from Manigachhi (Vidhan Sabha constituency) as an Indian National Congress candidate and won two consecutive terms. He became a member of Bihar Legislative Council in 2014. He was appointed chief of Bihar Pradesh Congress Committee in 2018. In 2022, he resigned from the post and Dr Akhilesh Prasad Singh became the new president of Bihar Pradesh Congress Committee. He was defeated in his bid for re-election in 2026.
