= Suzuki Eeco =

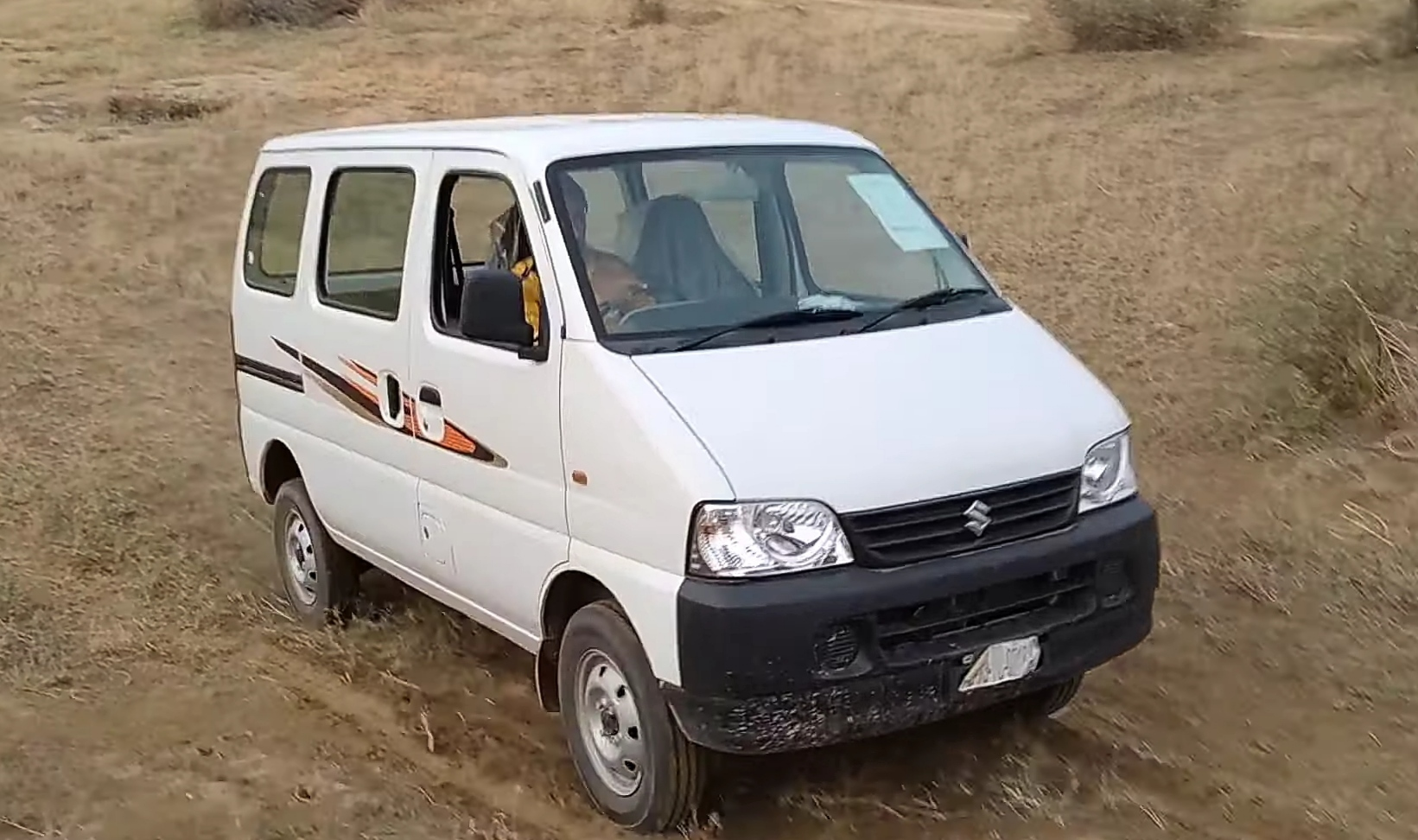

Overview
- Manufacturer: Suzuki
- Also called: Suzuki Versa (India, 2001–2009); Suzuki Every Plus / Landy; Suzuki Carry 1.3; Suzuki E-RV (Malaysia); Suzuki Mastervan (Chile); Ford Pronto P-RZ (Taiwan)
- Production: 2001–2009 (Versa); 2010–present (Eeco)
- Assembly: India: Gurgaon (Maruti Suzuki)

Body and chassis
- Class: Microvan
- Body style: 4-door minivan
- Layout: Front mid-engine, rear-wheel-drive
- Related: Suzuki Every Plus

Powertrain
- Engine: 1196cc G12B I4; 1197cc K12N I4; 1298cc G13BB I4
- Transmission: 5-speed manual

Dimensions
- Wheelbase: 2,350 mm (92.5 in)
- Length: 3,675 mm (144.7 in)
- Width: 1,475 mm (58.1 in)
- Height: 1,800–1,825 mm (70.9–71.9 in) (Eeco); 1,905 mm (75.0 in) (Versa)
- Curb weight: 908–935 kg (2,002–2,061 lb) (Eeco); 930–985 kg (2,050–2,172 lb) (Versa)

Chronology
- Predecessor: Maruti Omni

The Suzuki Eeco (upgraded version of Suzuki Versa) is a microvan produced by Suzuki through its Indian subsidiary Maruti Suzuki since 2010. It is a stripped down version of the discontinued Versa which itself was the Indian version of the Suzuki Every Plus / Landy, which is an extended version of the tenth generation Carry van. It is also the entry-level replacement for the Omni, discontinued in 2019 after Suzuki was unable to redesign the Omni to meet India's safety standards.

Since 2022, the Eeco has been exported to markets such as the Middle East.

== Overview ==
=== Versa ===
Originally, the van was launched as Versa in 2001 and based on the Every Plus / Carry 1.3. The van was powered by the same 1298cc G13BB engine that also seen in the original model or the familiar Esteem. The engine puts out 83 PS (61 kW; 82 hp) and paired with a 5-speed manual transmission. It was offered in there trim levels; STD, DX and DX2. The van was later discontinued in late 2009.

=== Eeco ===
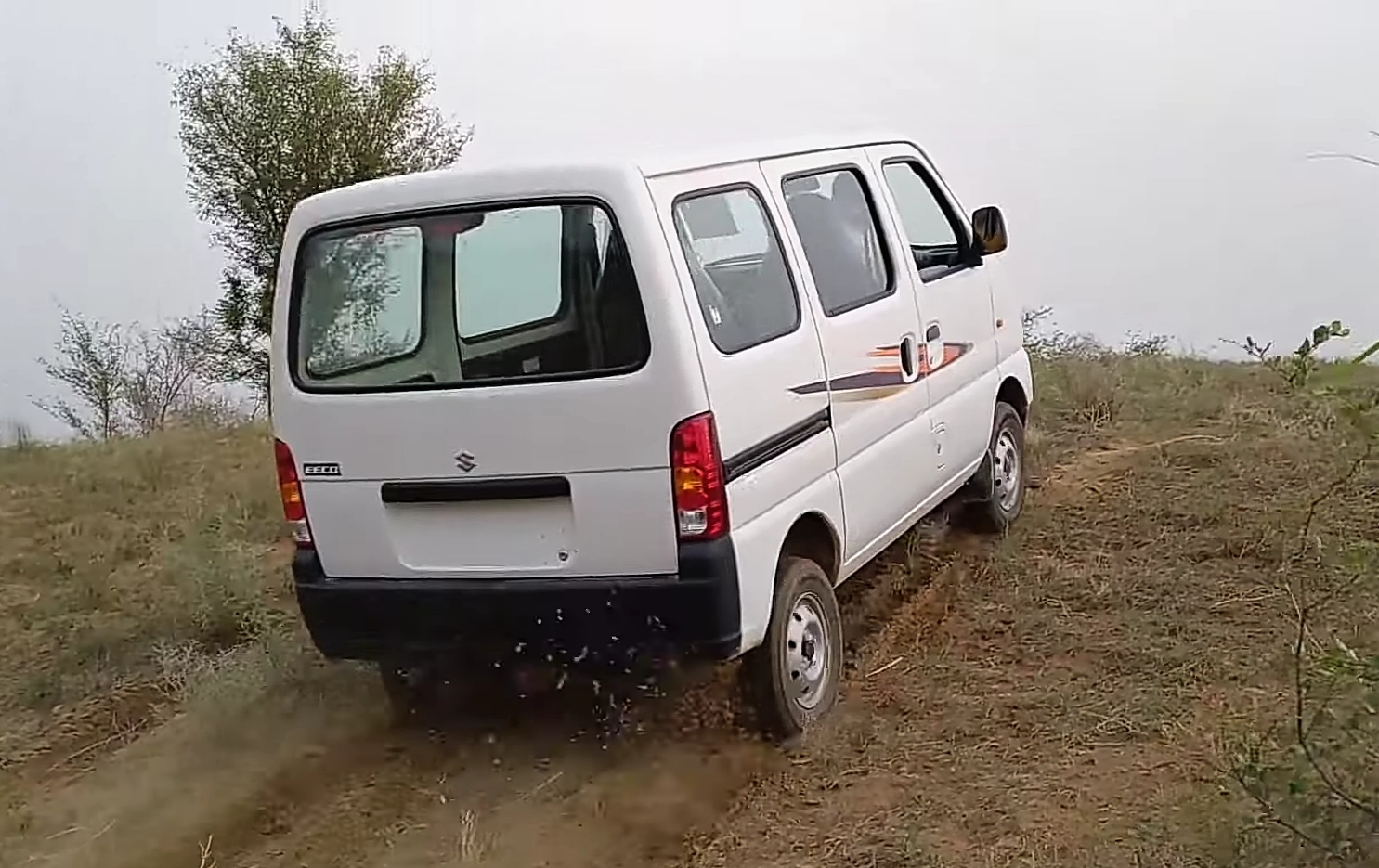
Rear view of Maruti Suzuki Eeco

Maruti Suzuki relaunched the Versa as Eeco in January 2010. The van was revised with downgrading some Versa's features and visual such as the dual blower air conditioning and colored bumpers, although the headlights were updated with more modern style. The G13BB engine was also downsized by reducing the displacement to 1196cc (G12B), the engine produced 73 PS (54 kW; 72 hp). The 5-speed gearbox was also carried over from Versa. Unlike the Versa, factory fitted CNG was available for this engine, marketed as Intelligent Gas Port Injection (i-GPI) and later as S-CNG.

In March 2019, the Eeco received major safety features such as driver side airbag, ABS, seat belt reminder system, speed alert and reverse parking sensors as standard across the range.

In November 2022, the Eeco received few upgrades such as a new engine, which is a 1.2-litre K12N Dualjet petrol engine, which produces 81 PS (60 kW; 80 hp), an increase of 8 PS (6 kW; 8 hp), and a claimed 25–29% higher fuel efficiency. It also received a digital speedometer from the S-Presso, engine immobiliser, new steering wheel design and steering column, rotary dials for the AC knob, cabin air-filter for the AC, illuminated hazard switch, and dual airbags. The Eeco also started being exported to the Middle East.

== Safety ==
The Eeco for India with no airbags nor ABS received 0 stars for adult occupants and 2 stars for toddlers from Global NCAP 1.0 in 2016 (similar to Latin NCAP 2013).

Global NCAP 1.0 test results (India) Maruti Suzuki Eeco – No Airbags (2016, similar to Latin NCAP 2013)
Test	Score	Stars
Adult occupant protection	1.13/17.00	0 /5 stars
Child occupant protection	24.20/49.00	2 /5 stars

In South Africa the Eeco is sold as standard with ABS and dual SRS airbags.
