= Jagdish Prasad Singh =

Indian writer

- Born: 1934; Mirganj, Rohtas, India
- Died: 2024 (aged 89–90); Patna, Bihar, India
- Occupations: Writer, Lecturer
- Children: 2
- Awards: Padma Shri

Jagdish Prasad Singh was an Indian writer who wrote in Hindi and English languages. The Government of India honoured him, in 2013, by awarding him Padma Shri, the fourth highest civilian award, for his contributions to the field of literature.

== Biography ==
Jagdish Prasad Singh hails from Mirganj village in Rohtas district of Bihar, in India. He was a faculty member of the Department of English at Magadh University.

He is credited with 10 novels in Hindi, over 200 short stories in Hindi, 7 novels in English, and 3 critical studies. Some of his notable works are The Curfew, Ganga Snan, Godhuli and Visangati.

== Selected works ==
- The Curfew
- Ganga Snan
- Visangati
- Bhagirathi
- The Sacred Fire
- Godhuli
