= R. C. Bhargava =

Maruti Suzuki chairman

- Born: 30 July 1934 (age 92); British Raj
- Education: The Doon School; Allahabad University; Williams College, Massachusetts
- Occupations: Chairman of Maruti Suzuki; Retired IAS officer

Ravindra Chandra Bhargava (born 30 July 1934) is the former C.E.O and current chairman of Maruti Suzuki, the largest automobile manufacturer in India, having joined the company after serving twenty-five years as an Indian Administrative Service officer.

== Education ==
Bhargava was educated at The Doon School, Allahabad University and Williams College, Massachusetts. After a long career as an Indian Administrative Service officer, he joined Maruti in 1981, where he has remained ever since. In 2016, he was awarded the Padma Bhushan, the third highest civilian award in the Republic of India.

== See also ==
- Maruti Suzuki
