= List of badge-engineered vehicles =

This is a list of vehicles that have been considered to be the result of badge engineering (rebadging), cloning, platform sharing, joint ventures between different car manufacturing companies, captive imports, or simply the practice of selling the same or similar cars in different markets (or even side-by-side in the same market) under different marques or model nameplates.

== Current examples ==
Original model	Also sold as	Markets
Baojun 530	Chevrolet Captiva	Colombia, Thailand, Fiji, Brunei, Latin America, Middle East
Baojun 530	MG Hector	India
Baojun 530	Wuling Almaz	Indonesia
Baojun 730	Wuling Cortez	Indonesia
Baojun Yep Plus	Chevrolet Spark EUV	South America, Middle East, Brazil
Baojun Yunduo	Wuling Cloud EV	Indonesia
Baojun Yunduo	MG Windsor EV	India
Beijing BJ80	IVM G80	Africa
Beijing BJ80	SVOS 80	Unknown
Beijing Mofang	Tiger Six	Europe
Beijing Mofang	Cirelli 4 (Former)	Europe
Beijing X7	Max Motor Tiara Prime	Iran
Beijing X7	Tiger Eight	Europe
BMW 4 Series Gran Coupe (G26)	BMW i4 (G26)	Electric Version (Worldwide)
BMW 7 Series (G70)	BMW i7 (G71)	Electric Version (Worldwide)
Chery eQ1	DR 1.0	Italy
Chery Tiggo 3x	DR 3.0	Italy
Chery Tiggo 3x	MVM X22	Iran
Chery Tiggo 5x	DR 5.0	Italy
Chery Tiggo 5x	Sportequipe 5	Italy
Chery Tiggo 5x	MVM X55	Iran
Chery Tiggo 7	DR 6.0	Italy
Chery Tiggo 8	DR 7.0	Italy
Chevrolet Blazer EV	Honda Prologue	North America
Chevrolet Colorado	GMC Canyon	United States, Canada, Mexico
Chevrolet Express	GMC Savana	United States, Canada
Chevrolet Silverado	GMC Sierra	United States, Canada, Mexico
Chevrolet Suburban	GMC Yukon XL	United States, Canada, Mexico
Chevrolet Suburban	Cadillac Escalade ESV	United States, Canada, Mexico
Chevrolet Tahoe	GMC Yukon	United States, Canada, Mexico
Chevrolet Tahoe	Cadillac Escalade	United States, Canada, Mexico
Chevrolet Colorado	GMC Canyon (2nd/3rd gen.)	United States, Canada
Chevrolet Colorado	Chevrolet S-10 (2nd gen.)	South America
Chrysler Pacifica	Chrysler Voyager	United States (low-end models)
Citroën Ami	Opel Rocks Electric	Germany, Netherlands
Citroën Ami	Fiat Topolino	Italy, United States
Citroën Berlingo	Peugeot Partner	Europe
Citroën Berlingo	Peugeot Rifter	Europe
Citroën Berlingo	Opel Combo	Europe (excluding UK)
Citroën Berlingo	Vauxhall Combo	United Kingdom
Citroën Berlingo	Toyota ProAce City	Europe
Citroën Berlingo	Fiat Doblò	Europe
Citroën Jumpy	Peugeot Expert	Europe
Citroën Jumpy	Fiat Scudo	Europe
Citroën Jumpy	Opel Vivaro	Europe (excluding UK)
Citroën Jumpy	Vauxhall Vivaro	United Kingdom
Citroën Jumpy	Toyota ProAce	Europe
Citroën Jumpy	Iveco eJolly	Europe
Citroën Jumpy	Ram ProMaster City	North America
Citroën SpaceTourer	Peugeot Traveller	Europe
Citroën SpaceTourer	Opel Zafira Life	Europe
Citroën SpaceTourer	Vauxhall Vivaro Life	Europe
Citroën SpaceTourer	Toyota ProAce Verso	Europe
Cupra Tavascan	Volkswagen ID. Unyx 06	China
Dacia Dokker	Renault Dokker	Ukraine
Dacia Duster	Renault Duster	South America, Russia, India
Daihatsu Ayla	Toyota Agya	Indonesia
Daihatsu Ayla	Perodua Axia	Malaysia
Daihatsu Ayla	Toyota Wigo	Philippines, Sri Lanka, Brunei, Vietnam
Daihatsu e-Hijet Cargo	Toyota Pixis Van (BEV)	Japan
Daihatsu e-Hijet Cargo	Suzuki e Every	Japan
Daihatsu Gran Max	Toyota TownAce (2008–present)	Japan
Daihatsu Gran Max	Mazda Bongo (2020–present)	Japan
Daihatsu Hijet	Toyota Pixis Truck/Van	Japan
Daihatsu Hijet	Subaru Sambar Truck/Van (2012–present)	Japan
Daihatsu Mira e:S	Toyota Pixis Epoch	Japan
Daihatsu Mira e:S	Subaru Pleo Plus	Japan
Daihatsu Move	Subaru Stella (2011–2023, 2025–present)	Japan
Daihatsu Rocky (A200)	Toyota Raize	Japan, Indonesia, and others
Daihatsu Rocky (A200)	Subaru Rex	Japan
Daihatsu Rocky (A200)	Perodua Ativa	Malaysia
Daihatsu Sigra	Toyota Calya	Indonesia
Daihatsu Tanto	Subaru Chiffon	Japan
Daihatsu Terios	Toyota Rush	Indonesia
Daihatsu Terios	Perodua Aruz	Malaysia
Daihatsu Thor	Toyota Roomy	Japan
Daihatsu Thor	Subaru Justy (2016–present)	Japan
Daihatsu Xenia	Toyota Avanza	Indonesia
Daihatsu Xenia	Perodua Alza (2nd gen.)	Malaysia
Dongfeng Z9	Nissan Frontier Pro	China
Dongfeng Z9	Santana 400	Spain
Fangchengbao Ti7	BYD Ti7	Worldwide
Fengon 580	Cirelli 4	Europe
Fengon 580	Evolute i-SPACE	Russia
Fiat Ducato	Citroën Jumper	Europe
Fiat Ducato	Peugeot Boxer	Europe, Middle East
Fiat Ducato	Ram ProMaster	United States, Canada
Fiat Ducato	Opel Movano	Europe (excluding UK)
Fiat Ducato	Vauxhall Movano	United Kingdom
Fiat Ducato	Toyota ProAce Max	Europe
Fiat Ducato	Iveco eSuperJolly	Europe
Fiat Strada	Ram 700	Mexico
Fiat Toro	Ram 1000	Colombia
Foday Lion F22	SAF Striker	Malaysia
Foday Lion F22	Innoson G6C	Africa
Foday Lion F22	Kandi K32	North America
Foday Lion F22	Dongfeng Yufeng P16	Asia
Foday Lion F22	King Long Venus 3/Dracon/NEX EV	Asia
Ford Edge	Lincoln Nautilus	United States, Canada, China
Ford Expedition	Lincoln Navigator	United States, Canada, Mexico, Kuwait, Middle East, China
Ford Expedition	Ford Expedition Max	Canada, Mexico
Ford Expedition	Lincoln Navigator L	United States, Philippines, Middle East, China
Ford F-150	Ford Lobo	Mexico
Ford Transit	JMC Teshun (Second Generation)	Asia, Africa, Latin America
Ford Transit	StreetScooter Work XL (Fourth Generation)	Europe
Ford Transit	JMC Fushun (Third Generation)	Asia, Africa, Latin America
Ford Tourneo/Transit Custom (Second Generation)	Volkswagen Transporter (2024)	Europe
Foxtron Bria	Mitsubishi ASX VR-e	Australia
Geely Binyue	Proton X50	Malaysia, Mauritius, South Africa, Mozambique
Geely Binyue	BelGee X50	Belarus, Russia
Geely Boyue	Proton X70	Malaysia, Brunei, Kenya, Pakistan, South Africa, Mozambique
Geely Emgrand	Proton S70	Malaysia
Geely Emgrand L	Maple 60S	China
Geely Emgrand L	Geometry A	China
Geely Emgrand S	Geometry M6	China (Electric Version)
Geely EX2	Proton eMas 5	Malaysia
Geely EX5	Proton eMas 7	Malaysia
Geely Haoyue	Proton X90	Malaysia, Brunei, South Africa
Geely Haoyue	Livan 9	Electric Version
Geely Jiaji	Maple 80V	Electric Version
Geely Yuanjing X3	Maple X3 Pro	China
Geely Yuanjing X3	Maple 30X	Electric Version
Honda Accord	Honda Inspire	China
Honda Avancier (crossover)	Honda UR-V	China
Honda Civic	Honda Integra	China
Honda CR-V	Honda Breeze	China
Honda Fit	Honda Life	China
Honda HR-V (global)/Vezel	Honda XR-V	China
Honda Odyssey (international)	Honda Elysion	China
Honda ZR-V	Honda HR-V	North America, China
Hyundai Genesis	Genesis G80	Worldwide from 2017
Hyundai Sonata	Kia K5	South Korea from 2010, worldwide from 2019
Hyundai ST1	Iveco eMoovy	Europe
Hyundai Tucson	Kia Sportage	Worldwide
IM L6	MG IM5	Europe, Australasia, Thailand
IM LS6	MG IM6	Europe, Australasia, Thailand
Isuzu D-Max	Mazda BT-50	Australia, Malaysia, Philippines, Thailand
Isuzu D-Max	Qingling Taga	China
Jiabao V80	FAW Jiefang T80/T90	China
Jiabao V80	Higer H4E	China
Jiabao V80	NAC Chang Da H9	China
JAC Shuailing T8	DR PK8	Italy
JAC Shuailing T8	Evo Cross 4	Italy
JAC Shuailing T8	Sollers ST8	Russia
JAC Shuailing T8	KMC T8	Iran
JAC Refine S2	Evo 3	Italy
JAC Refine S3	Evo 4	Italy
King Long Kaige	CAM Placer-X	Malaysia
King Long Kaige	Golden Dragon X5/Z4	Asia, Africa, South America
King Long Jinwei	MAZ-182	Belarus
King Long Jinwei	Skywell D10	Asia
King Long Jinwei	Golden Dragon V3/V4	Asia
LEVC L380	Geely Galaxy LEVC L380	China
Maxus V80	Dongfeng Yufeng	Asia
Maxus D90	MG Gloster/Majestor	India
Maxus D90	LDV D90	Australasia
Maxus G50	MG G50/G50 Plus	Philippines, Taiwan, Vietnam
Maxus T60	MG Extender	Southeast Asia, Pakistan
Maxus T60	Chevrolet S-10 (3rd gen.)	South America
Maxus T60	Chevrolet D-Max (from 2025)	Ecuador
Maxus T60	LDV T60	Australasia
Maxus T60	Maxus Tornado 60/Tornado 70 Pro	Middle East
Maxus T60	MG T60	Middle East
Maxus Terron 9	LDV Terron 9	Australia
Maxus Terron 9	MGU9	Australia, Pakistan
Maxus V70	LDV Deliver 7	Australia
Maxus V70	Iveco Fidato	China
Maxus V70	Chevrolet Express Max	Mexico
Mercedes-Benz GLA	Mercedes-Benz EQA	Worldwide
Mercedes-Benz V-Class/Vito	Mercedes-Benz EQV/eVito	Worldwide
Mitsubishi Attrage	Mitsubishi Mirage G4	North America, Philippines
Mitsubishi eK	Nissan Dayz	Japan
Mitsubishi eK Space	Nissan Roox (2020–present)	Japan
Mitsubishi Minicab EV	Nissan Clipper EV	Japan
Mitsubishi Outlander PHEV	Nissan Rogue Plug-in Hybrid	North America
Mitsubishi Triton (6th gen.)	Nissan Navara (4th gen.)	Australia, New Zealand
Mitsubishi Xpander	Nissan Livina	Indonesia
Nissan Caravan	Nissan Urvan	Outside Japan
Nissan Caravan	Isuzu Como	Japan
Nissan Caravan	Mitsubishi Fuso Canter Van	Outside Japan
Nissan Caravan	Mitsubishi Versa Van	Philippines
Nissan Leaf	Mitsubishi Eclipse Sportback	North America
Nissan Navara (3rd gen.)	Dongfeng Rich 6/7	China, Asia
Nissan Terra	Fengdu Paladin	China
Nissan Terra	Maanian Terra	Iran
Nissan X-Trail (2013–present)	Nissan Rogue (2013–present)	United States, Canada
Opel Astra	Vauxhall Astra	United Kingdom
Opel Corsa F	Vauxhall Corsa	United Kingdom
Opel Insignia	Buick Regal Sportback	North America
Opel Mokka	Vauxhall Mokka	United Kingdom
Perodua Myvi	Daihatsu Sirion	Indonesia
Peugeot Landtrek	Changan F70	China
Peugeot Landtrek	Changan Hunter	China
Peugeot Landtrek	Fiat Titano	South America, Algeria
Peugeot Landtrek	Ram 1200	Mexico
Peugeot Landtrek	Ram Dakota	Argentina, Brazil
Qingling Taga	Sandeurs 100	Vietnam
Renault 5 E-Tech	Alpine A290	Europe
Renault 5 E-Tech	Nissan Micra EV	Europe
Renault Captur	Mitsubishi ASX	Europe
Renault Kangoo II	Mercedes-Benz Citan	Europe
Renault Kangoo III	Nissan Townstar	Europe
Renault Koleos III	Renault Grand Koleos	South Korea
Renault Kwid	Renault City K-ZE	Electric Version
Renault Kwid	Dacia Spring EV	Europe
Renault Master	Nissan Interstar	Europe, South America
Renault Symbioz	Mitsubishi Grandis	Europe
Renault Scenic E-Tech	Mitsubishi Eclipse Cross EV	Europe
Renault Trafic	Nissan Primastar	Europe
Renault Trafic	Renault Trucks Trafic	Worldwide
Renault Triber	Nissan Gravite	India
Roewe RX5	MG RX5	Middle East
SEAT Ateca	Cupra Ateca	Performance Model
SEAT Ateca	Jetta VS5	China
SEAT Tarraco	Jetta VS7	China
Suzuki Alto	Mazda Carol	Japan
Suzuki Baleno	Toyota Glanza	India
Suzuki Carry	Mazda Scrum Truck	Japan
Suzuki Carry	Mitsubishi Minicab Truck (2014–present)	Japan
Suzuki Carry	Nissan Clipper Truck (2024–present)	Japan
Suzuki e Vitara	Toyota Urban Cruiser (BEV)	Worldwide
Suzuki e Vitara	Toyota Urban Cruiser Ebella	India
Suzuki Ertiga	Toyota Rumion	India
Suzuki Every	Mazda Scrum Van	Japan
Suzuki Every	Mitsubishi Minicab Van (2014–present)	Japan
Suzuki Every	Nissan Clipper Van (2024–present)	Japan
Suzuki Every Wagon	Mazda Scrum Wagon	Japan
Suzuki Every Wagon	Mitsubishi Town Box (2014–present)	Japan
Suzuki Every Wagon	Nissan Clipper Rio (2024–present)	Japan
Suzuki Fronx	Toyota Urban Cruiser Taisor	India
Suzuki Fronx	Toyota Starlet Cross	Africa
Suzuki Grand Vitara	Toyota Urban Cruiser	India
Suzuki Hustler	Mazda Flair Crossover	Japan
Suzuki Solio	Mitsubishi Delica D:2	Japan
Suzuki Spacia	Mazda Flair Wagon (2013–present)	Japan
Suzuki Wagon R	Mazda Flair	Japan
Trumpchi Empow	Dodge Attitude	Mexico
Toyota Alphard	Toyota Vellfire	Japan and selected Asian markets
Toyota Alphard	Toyota Crown Vellfire	China
Toyota bZ4X	Subaru Solterra	Worldwide
Toyota bZ4X Touring	Subaru Trailseeker	Worldwide
Toyota C-HR+	Subaru Uncharted	Worldwide
Toyota Corolla (E210)	Toyota Levin	China
Toyota Corolla Cross	Toyota Frontlander	China
Toyota GR86	Subaru BRZ (2021–present)	Worldwide
Toyota HiAce	Mazda Bongo Brawny (2019–present)	Japan
Toyota HiAce	Jinbei Haise	Asia, Africa, South America
Toyota HiAce	King Long Jinwei	Asia, Africa, South America
Toyota Grand HiAce	Jinbei Haishiwang	China
Toyota Highlander	Toyota Crown Kluger	China
Toyota Highlander (BEV)	Subaru Getaway	North America
Toyota Hilux	TruckMasters OX	Finland
Toyota Land Cruiser Prado	Lexus GX	Worldwide
Toyota Noah	Toyota Voxy	Japan
Toyota Noah	Suzuki Landy (2022–present)	Japan
Toyota Probox	Mazda Familia Van (2018–present)	Japan
Toyota RAV4	Toyota Wildlander	China
Toyota RAV4	Suzuki Across	Europe
Toyota Sienna	Toyota Granvia	China
Toyota Yaris Cross (AC200)	Perodua Traz	Malaysia
Toyota Yaris (XP210)	Mazda2 Hybrid	Europe
Volkswagen Caddy	Ford Tourneo/Transit Connect	Europe, Australia
Volkswagen Jetta	Jetta VA3	China
Wuling Air EV	Chevrolet Spark EV	Egypt
Wuling Air EV	MG Comet EV	India
Wuling Hongguang V	Chevrolet N400	South America
Wuling Hongguang Mini EV	Freze Nikrob	Lithuania
Wuling Hongguang Mini EV	Rainwoll RW10	Turkey
Wuling Hongguang Mini EV	SGMW Mini EV	Vietnam
Wuling Starlight S	Chevrolet Captiva EV/PHEV	Latin America, Middle East
Wuling Xingchi	Chevrolet Groove	Latin America, Middle East
Zeekr 009	Volvo EM90	China

== Past examples ==
Model nameplate	also sold as	where sold
Acadian (1962–1971)	Chevrolet Chevy II / Nova	Canada
AC Cobra	Shelby Cobra	North America
Acura MDX	Honda MDX	Japan, Australia
Alfa Romeo Tonale	Dodge Hornet	North America
Audi 50	Volkswagen Polo Mk1	Western Europe
Austin 1100 (1962–1977)	Morris 1100	Europe
Austin 1100 (1962–1977)	MG 1100	Europe
Austin 1100 (1962–1977)	Austin Glider	Netherlands
Austin 1100 (1962–1977)	Riley Kestrel	Europe
Austin 1100 (1962–1977)	Wolseley 1100	Europe
Austin 1100 (1962–1977)	Vanden Plas 1100	Europe
Autozam AZ-1	Suzuki Cara	Japan
Baojun 510	Chevrolet Groove	Latin America, Middle East
Baojun 630	Chevrolet Optra	Egypt, Algeria
Baojun E200	Wuling Nano EV	China
Beaumont	Acadian Beaumont	United States
BMW X3 (G01)	BMW iX3 (G08)	Electric Version (Worldwide)
Buick Apollo	Chevrolet Nova	United States, Canada
Buick Apollo	Oldsmobile Omega	United States, Canada
Buick Apollo	Pontiac Ventura (1971-1977)	United States
Buick Apollo	Pontiac Phoenix (1977-1979)	United States
Buick Century (1982–1996)	Chevrolet Celebrity (1982–1990)	United States, Canada
Buick Century (1982–1996)	Chevrolet Century/Cutlass/Eurosport	Mexico
Buick Century (1982–1996)	Oldsmobile Cutlass Ciera (1982–1995)	United States, Canada
Buick Century (1982–1996)	Oldsmobile Ciera (1996)	United States, Canada
Buick Century (1982–1996)	Pontiac 6000 (1982–1991)	United States, Canada
Buick LaCrosse	Alpheon EL300	South Korea
Buick LaCrosse	Roewe 950	China
Buick LaCrosse	Buick Allure	Canada
Chery Tiggo 7	DR 6.0	Italy
Chery Tiggo 8	Sportequipe 7	Italy
Chery Tiggo 8	Sportequipe 8	Italy
Chevrolet Astro	GMC Safari	United States, Canada
Chevrolet Avalanche	Cadillac Escalade EXT	United States, Canada, Mexico
Chevrolet Blazer	GMC Jimmy	United States, Canada
Chevrolet Blazer	Oldsmobile Bravada	United States, Canada
Chevrolet Bolt	Opel Ampera-e	Europe, excluding UK
Chevrolet Caprice	Buick Roadmaster (Station Wagon)	United States
Chevrolet Caprice	Oldsmobile Custom Cruiser	United States
Chevrolet Cavalier	Toyota Cavalier (1995–2004)	Japan
Chevrolet Cavalier	Pontiac Sunfire (1995–2005)	United States, Canada
Chevrolet Cavalier	Cadillac Cimarron (1982–1988)	United States, Canada
Chevrolet Cavalier	Buick Skyhawk (1982–1989)	United States, Canada
Chevrolet Cavalier	Oldsmobile Firenza (1982–1988)	United States, Canada
Chevrolet Cavalier	Pontiac J2000/2000/Sunbird	United States, Canada
Chevrolet Celta	Suzuki Fun	Argentina
Chevrolet Chevette	Pontiac Acadian	Canada
Chevrolet Chevette	GMC Chevette	Argentina
Chevrolet Chevette	Pontiac T1000/1000 (1981–1987)	United States
Chevrolet Cobalt	Pontiac G5 (coupe/sedan)	Canada
Chevrolet Cobalt	Pontiac G5 (coupe only)	United States
Chevrolet Colorado	Holden Colorado	Australia, New Zealand
Chevrolet Colorado	HSV SportsCat (2nd gen.)	Australia, New Zealand
Chevrolet Corsica	Pontiac Tempest	Canada
Chevrolet Cruze (1st Gen.)	Holden Cruze	Australia
Chevrolet Cruze (1st Gen.)	Daewoo Lacetti Premiere	South Korea
Chevrolet Cruze (2nd Gen.)	Holden Astra Sedan	Australia
Chevrolet El Camino	GMC Sprint (1971–1977)	North America
Chevrolet El Camino	GMC Caballero (1978–1987)	North America
Chevrolet Equinox	Holden Equinox	Australia
Chevrolet Equinox	Pontiac Torrent	United States, Canada
Chevrolet Impala	Chevrolet Caprice	United States, Canada, Europe
Chevrolet Impala	Pontiac Parisienne	United States, Canada
Chevrolet Lumina APV	Oldsmobile Silhouette	United States, Canada
Chevrolet Lumina APV	Pontiac Trans Sport	United States, Canada
Chevrolet Malibu	Holden Malibu	Australia, New Zealand
Chevrolet Montana	Opel Corsa Utility	South Africa
Chevrolet S-10	GMC Sonoma	United States, Canada
Chevrolet S-10	Isuzu Hombre	United States
Chevrolet Spark (4th gen.)	Opel Karl	Europe (except UK)
Chevrolet Spark (4th gen.)	Vauxhall Viva	UK
Chevrolet Spark (4th gen.)	Holden Spark	Australia, New Zealand
Chevrolet Spark (4th gen.)	VinFast Fadil	Vietnam
Chevrolet Suburban	GMC Suburban	United States, Canada
Chevrolet Suburban	Holden Suburban	Australia, New Zealand
Chevrolet Tahoe	Chevrolet Grand Blazer (in Brazil)	South America
Chevrolet TrailBlazer (also EXT)	GMC Envoy (also XL)	United States, Canada
Chevrolet TrailBlazer (also EXT)	Oldsmobile Bravada (discontinued in 2004)	United States, Canada
Chevrolet TrailBlazer (also EXT)	Saab 9-7X	United States, Canada, Europe, Middle East
Chevrolet TrailBlazer (also EXT)	Buick Rainier (discontinued in 2007)	United States, Canada
Chevrolet TrailBlazer (also EXT)	Isuzu Ascender	United States
Chevrolet TrailBlazer (also EXT)	Opel Blazer	Indonesia
Chevrolet Trax	Holden Trax	Australia, New Zealand
Chevrolet Uplander	Pontiac Montana SV6	United States, Canada, Mexico
Chevrolet Uplander	Buick Terraza	United States, Canada
Chevrolet Uplander	Saturn Relay	United States, Canada
Chevrolet Venture	Opel/Vauxhall Sintra	Europe (as Opel), except United Kingdom (as Vauxhall)
Chevrolet Venture	Oldsmobile Silhouette	United States, Canada
Chevrolet Venture	Pontiac Montana	United States
Chevrolet Volt (first generation)	Opel Ampera	Europe, excluding UK (shared 2690mm wheelbase)
Chevrolet Volt (first generation)	Holden Volt	Australia, New Zealand
Chevrolet Volt (first generation)	Vauxhall Ampera	United Kingdom (shared 2690mm wheelbase)
Chevrolet Volt (second generation)	Buick Velite 5	China (shared 2690mm wheelbase)
Chrysler 200 (Cabrio)	Lancia Flavia	Europe
Chrysler 300	Lancia Thema	Europe
Chrysler Cirrus	Dodge Stratus (1995–2000)	United States, Canada
Chrysler Cirrus	Plymouth Breeze	United States, Canada
Chrysler Concorde	Chrysler LHS (1994-2001)	United States, Canada
Chrysler Concorde	Chrysler New Yorker (1994-1996)	United States
Chrysler Concorde	Dodge Intrepid	United States
Chrysler Concorde	Eagle Vision (1993-1997)	United States, Canada
Chrysler Concorde	Chrysler Intrepid	Canada
Chrysler Fifth Avenue	Dodge Diplomat	United States, Canada
Chrysler Fifth Avenue	Plymouth Gran Fury	United States
Chrysler Fifth Avenue	Plymouth Caravelle	Canada
Chrysler Horizon	Dodge Omni	United States, Canada
Chrysler Horizon	Plymouth Horizon	United States
Chrysler Horizon	Talbot Horizon	Europe
Chrysler Horizon	Simca Horizon	France
Chrysler LeBaron	Chrysler Town & Country	United States, Canada
Chrysler LeBaron	Dodge 400	United States
Chrysler LeBaron	Dodge Aries	United States
Chrysler LeBaron	Plymouth Reliant	United States
Chrysler LeBaron (1990-1995)	Dodge Spirit	United States
Chrysler LeBaron (1990-1995)	Plymouth Acclaim	United States
Chrysler LeBaron (1990-1995)	Chrysler Saratoga (1989-1995)	Europe
Chrysler Pacifica	Chrysler Grand Caravan	Canada, low-end models
Chrysler Sebring	Dodge Stratus	United States
Chrysler Sebring	Chrysler Stratus	Brazil
Chrysler Sebring	GAZ Volga Siber	Russia
Chrysler Town and Country	Dodge Grand Caravan	United States, Canada
Chrysler Town and Country	Plymouth Voyager (1984-2000)	United States, Canada
Chrysler Town and Country	Lancia Grand Voyager	Europe
Chrysler Town and Country	Volkswagen Routan	United States, Canada, Mexico
Citroën AX	Proton Tiara	Malaysia
Chery Tiggo	DR5	Italy
Chery Tiggo 3	DR Evo 5	Italy
Chery Tiggo 3	MVM X33	Iran
Chery Tiggo 5	Cowin X5	China
Chery Tiggo 5	DR6	Italy
Chery Tiggo 7	DR F35	Italy
Dacia Duster	Nissan Terrano	India
Dacia Lodgy	Renault Lodgy	Ukraine, India
Dacia Logan I	Renault Logan	Russia, Israel, Venezuela, Colombia, Argentina, Brazil
Dacia Logan I	Renault Tondar	Iran
Dacia Logan I	Nissan Aprio	Mexico
Dacia Logan II	Renault Symbol III	Turkey, Algeria, Tunisia, Chile
Dacia Logan II	Renault Logan	Brazil, Argentina
Dacia Logan II	Mahindra Verito	India, Russia
Dacia Logan II	Lada Largus (MCV)	Russia
Dacia Sandero I	Renault Sandero	South America
Daewoo Kalos	Chevrolet Aveo	United States, Canada, China, India, Southeast Asia, Eastern Europe, South Africa, Middle East, South America
Daewoo Kalos	Chevrolet Kalos	Western Europe
Daewoo Kalos	Chevrolet Lova	China
Daewoo Kalos	Daewoo Gentra/Daewoo Gentra X	South Korea
Daewoo Kalos	Suzuki Swift+	Canada
Daewoo Kalos	Pontiac Wave/Pontiac Wave G3/Pontiac G3	North America (formerly Canada and Mexico only)
Daewoo Kalos	Holden Barina	Australia, New Zealand
Daewoo Kalos	ZAZ Vida	Ukraine
Daewoo LeMans	Pontiac LeMans	North America, New Zealand
Daewoo Matiz	Chevrolet Matiz	Western Europe
Daewoo Matiz	Chevrolet Spark	China, India, South America, Eastern Europe, South Africa, Middle East, Southeast Asia
Daewoo Matiz	Pontiac Matiz G2	Mexico
Daewoo Lacetti (hatchback)	Chevrolet Lacetti	Europe
Daewoo Lacetti (hatchback)	Suzuki Reno	United States
Daewoo Lacetti (hatchback)	Chevrolet Optra5	Canada, India, Japan, Guam, Northern Mariana Islands
Daewoo Lacetti (hatchback)	Buick HRV	China
Daewoo Lacetti (hatchback)	Holden Viva	Australia, New Zealand
Daewoo Lacetti (sedan)	Chevrolet Lacetti	Europe
Daewoo Lacetti (sedan)	Suzuki Forenza	United States
Daewoo Lacetti (sedan)	Chevrolet Optra	Canada, India, Japan, Philippines, Singapore, Guam, Northern Mariana Islands
Daewoo Lacetti (sedan)	Buick Excelle	China
Daewoo Lacetti (sedan)	Holden Viva	Australia, New Zealand
Daewoo Lacetti Premiere	Chevrolet Cruze	Europe, United States, Thailand
Daewoo Lacetti Premiere	Holden Cruze	Australia, New Zealand
Daewoo Magnus	Chevrolet Evanda	Europe
Daewoo Magnus	Suzuki Verona	North America
Daewoo Magnus	Chevrolet Epica	Canada, Chile, China, Colombia, Guam, Northern Mariana Islands
Daewoo Nubira	Chevrolet Optra	Canada, South Africa, Thailand, India, Chile, Colombia
Daewoo Nubira	Chevrolet Nubira	Western Europe
Daewoo Nubira	Chevrolet Lacetti	Eastern Europe
Daewoo Nubira	Suzuki Forenza	United States
Daewoo Nubira	Buick Excelle	China
Daewoo Rezzo	Chevrolet Tacuma/Rezzo	Europe
Daewoo Rezzo	Chevrolet Vivant	South Africa, Chile
Daewoo Tosca	Chevrolet Epica	Europe, China, Colombia
Daewoo Tosca	Holden Epica	Australia, New Zealand
Daewoo Winstorm	Chevrolet Captiva	Europe, Asia
Daewoo Winstorm	Holden Captiva	Australia, New Zealand
Daewoo Lanos	Chevrolet Lanos	Russia, Egypt
Daewoo Lanos	Doninvest Assol	Russia
Daewoo Lanos	FSO Lanos	Poland
Daewoo Lanos	ZAZ Lanos	Ukraine
Daihatsu Atrai Wagon	Subaru Dias Wagon (2009–2020)	Japan
Daihatsu Hijet	Piaggio Porter	Europe
Daihatsu Boon	Subaru Justy (4th gen.)	Europe
Daihatsu Boon	Perodua Myvi (2005-2017)	Malaysia, United Kingdom, Brunei
Daihatsu Boon	Toyota Passo	Japan
Daihatsu Boon Luminas	Toyota Passo Sette	Japan
Daihatsu Boon Luminas	Perodua Alza (1st gen.)	Malaysia, Brunei
Daihatsu Cast	Toyota Pixis Joy	Japan
Daihatsu Gran Max	Toyota LiteAce (2008–2020)	Japan
Daihatsu Mira	Subaru Pleo (2nd gen.)	Japan
Daihatsu Mira (3rd gen.)	Perodua Kancil	Malaysia, Brunei, Mauritius, Sri Lanka, United Kingdom
Daihatsu Mira (5th gen.)	Perodua Kelisa	Malaysia, United Kingdom
Daihatsu Mira (6th gen.)	Perodua Viva	Malaysia, Sri Lanka, Brunei, Nepal, Mauritius, Singapore
Daihatsu Move (2nd gen.)	Perodua Kenari	Malaysia, United Kingdom
Daihatsu Move Conte	Toyota Pixis Space	Japan
Daihatsu Tanto Exe	Subaru Lucra	Japan
Daihatsu Terios (1st gen.)	Toyota Cami	Japan
Daihatsu Terios (1st gen.)	Perodua Kembara	Malaysia
Daihatsu Terios (1st gen.)	Huali Dario Terios	China
Daihatsu Terios (2nd gen.)	Perodua Nautica	Malaysia
Daihatsu Thor	Toyota Tank	Japan
Daihatsu Wake	Daihatsu Hijet Caddie	Japan (microvan version)
Daihatsu Wake	Toyota Pixis Mega	Japan
Daihatsu Zebra (2nd gen.)	Perodua Rusa	Malaysia
Dodge Neon	Chrysler Neon	Canada, Europe, Brazil, Australia, South Africa, Thailand, Japan
Dodge Neon	Plymouth Neon (1995-2001)	United States
Dodge Shadow	Plymouth Sundance	United States, Canada
Dodge Shadow	Chrysler Shadow	Mexico
Dodge Shadow	Chrysler ES	Europe
Dodge Dart	Fiat Viaggio	China
Dodge Journey	Fiat Freemont	Europe, Brazil, Australia
Dongfeng Rich	Peugeot Pick Up (2017-21)	Africa
Eunos 500	Mazda Xedos 6	Europe
Eunos 800	Mazda Millenia	North America
Eunos 800	Mazda Xedos 9	Europe
Fiat Doblò	Opel Combo	Europe, except UK
Fiat Doblò	Vauxhall Combo	United Kingdom
Fiat Doblò	Ram ProMaster City	United States, Canada
Fiat Grand Siena	Dodge Vision	Mexico
Fiat Idea	Lancia Musa	Europe, Japan
Fiat Palio	Zotye Z200HB	China
Fiat Punto	Zastava 10	Serbia
Fiat Punto	Pyeonghwa Hwiparam	North Korea
Fiat Tipo	Dodge Neon	Mexico
Foday Explorer 6	Golden Dragon Righto V3	Asia
Foday Explorer 6	Kantanka Nkunimdie	Africa
Foday Landfort	SAF Landfort	Malaysia
Foday Landfort	Innoson G6	Africa
Foday Landfort	Dongfeng Yufeng P16	China
Foday Landfort	Esemka Garuda	Indonesia
Ford Bantam	Mazda Rustler	South Africa
Ford Crown Victoria	Mercury Grand Marquis	United States, Canada
Ford Crown Victoria	Lincoln Town Car	United States, Canada, Middle East
Ford Elite	Mercury Cougar (1974–1976)	United States, Canada
Ford Elite	Mercury Montego 2-door (1974–1976)	United States, Canada
Ford Escape	Ford Maverick	Europe
Ford Escape	Mazda Tribute	United States, Asia, Oceania
Ford Escape	Mercury Mariner	United States
Ford Windstar	Mercury Monterey	North America
Ford Escort	Mercury Lynx (1981-1987)	United States
Ford Escort	Mercury Tracer (1991-1999)	United States, Canada
Ford Everest (2003-2021)	Ford Endeavour	India
Ford Everest (2003-2021)	Arquus Trapper VT4	France
Ford Verona	Volkswagen Apollo	South America
Ford Verona	Ford Orion	Argentina
Ford Escort	Volkswagen Pointer	South America
Ford Escort	Volkswagen Logus	South America
Ford Mondeo	Ford Contour	North America
Ford Mondeo	Mercury Mystique	North America
Ford Explorer	Mazda Navajo	United States
Ford Explorer	Mercury Mountaineer	United States
Ford Explorer	Lincoln Aviator	United States
Ford Fairmont	Mercury Zephyr	United States, Canada
Ford Falcon	Nissan Ute	Australia
Ford Fiesta	Mazda 121/Soho	Europe (as 121), South Africa (as Soho)
Ford Fusion	Mercury Milan	United States, Puerto Rico, U.S. Virgin Islands, Mexico, Middle East
Ford Fusion	Lincoln Zephyr/MKZ (2006–2012)	United States, Canada
Ford Galaxy	Volkswagen Sharan	Europe
Ford Galaxy	SEAT Alhambra	Europe
Ford Granada	Mercury Monarch (1975–1980)	United States, Canada
Ford Granada	Lincoln Versailles (1977–1980)	United States, Canada
Ford Granada	Mercury Cougar (1981–1982)	United States, Canada
Ford Laser	Mercury Tracer	United States, Canada
Ford Maverick	Mercury Comet (1971–1977)	United States, Canada
Ford Mustang	Mercury Capri (1979–1986)	United States, Canada
Ford Pinto	Mercury Bobcat	United States, Canada
Ford Probe	Mazda MX-6	United States, Canada
Ford Scorpio	Merkur Scorpio	United States, Canada
Ford Sierra XR4i	Merkur XR4Ti	United States, Canada
Ford Taurus	Mercury Sable	United States, Canada
Ford Tempo	Mercury Topaz	United States, Canada
Ford Thunderbird	Continental Mark IV	United States, Canada
Ford Thunderbird	Mercury Cougar (1977–1997)	United States, Canada
Ford Thunderbird	Continental Mark VII (1984–1985)	United States, Canada
Ford Thunderbird	Lincoln Mark VII (1986–1992)	United States, Canada)
Ford Edge	Lincoln MKX	United States, Canada, Europe, Australia, New Zealand, China
Ford F-150	Lincoln Mark LT	United States, Canada, Mexico
Ford Fusion	Lincoln MKZ	North America, China
Ford Fusion	Ford Mondeo	Europe, Argentina, China
Ford Ranger (North America)	Mazda B-Series	North America
Ford Ranger (international)	Mazda BT-50 (2011–2020)	Worldwide, barring the U.S and Canada
Geely Emgrand S	Geometry C	China, Israel, Egypt (Electric Version)
GMC Acadia	Saturn Outlook	North America
Hafei Lobo	Naza Sutera	Malaysia
Hillman/Chrysler/Talbot Avenger	Plymouth Cricket	United States
Hillman/Chrysler/Talbot Avenger	Sunbeam Avenger	Denmark
Hillman/Chrysler/Talbot Avenger	Dodge Polara	Brazil
Hillman/Chrysler/Talbot Avenger	Dodge 1500	Argentina
Hillman/Chrysler/Talbot Avenger	Volkswagen 1500	Argentina
Holden Caprice	Holden Statesman	Australia, New Zealand
Holden Caprice	Chevrolet Caprice (Exclusively a police car in the United States)	United States, Middle East
Holden Caprice	Daewoo Statesman	South Korea
Holden Caprice	Daewoo Veritas	South Korea
Holden Caprice	Buick Royaum	China
Holden Caprice	Buick Park Avenue	China
Holden Caprice	Bitter Vero	Germany
Holden Commodore	Toyota Lexcen	Australia
Holden Commodore	Opel Calais	Malaysia, Singapore
Holden Commodore	Chevrolet Lumina	Middle East, South Africa, Southeast Asia
Holden Commodore	Pontiac G8	United States, Canada
Holden Commodore	Chevrolet Omega	South America
Holden Commodore	Chevrolet SS	United States
Holden Commodore	Bitter Vero Sport	Germany
Holden HT Monaro	Chevrolet SS	South Africa
Holden V2 Monaro	Vauxhall Monaro	United Kingdom
Holden V2 Monaro	Pontiac GTO	United States, Canada
Holden V2 Monaro	Chevrolet Lumina Coupe	Middle East
Holden Brougham	Chevrolet Constantia	South Africa
Holden Kingswood	Chevrolet Kommando	South Africa
Holden Kingswood	El Camino	South Africa
Holden Kingswood	El Torro	South Africa
Holden Premier	Mazda Roadpacer	Japan
Holden Torana	Chevrolet 1700	South Korea
Holden Torana	Saehan Camina	South Korea
HSV ClubSport	Chevrolet Special Vehicles CR8	Middle East
HSV ClubSport	Vauxhall VXR8	United Kingdom
HSV Coupé	Vauxhall Monaro VXR	United Kingdom
HSV GTS	Vauxhall VXR8	United Kingdom
Honda Accord	Isuzu Aska	Japan
Honda Accord	Acura TSX	North America
Honda Accord	Proton Perdana (2nd gen.)	Malaysia
Honda Ballade	Triumph Acclaim	UK, Europe
Honda Ballade	Rover 200	UK, Europe
Honda Civic	Honda Integra SJ	Japan
Honda Civic	Acura CSX	Canada
Honda Civic	Dongfeng-Honda Ciimo	China
Honda Civic	Everus S1	China
Honda Concerto	Rover 200	UK, Europe
Honda Concerto	Rover 400	UK, Europe
Honda Crider	Honda Envix	China
Honda Domani	Isuzu Gemini	Japan
Honda Domani	Rover 400/Rover 45/MG ZS	UK, Europe
Honda Inspire	Acura TL (1996-2003)	North America
Honda Inspire	Acura Vigor	North America
Honda Inspire	Honda Accord	North America, Latin America, Southeast Asia, Middle East, Caribbean, Australia, New Zealand; North America (2008-2012)
Honda Inspire	Honda Saber	Japan
Honda Inspire	Honda Vigor	Japan
Honda Integra	Rover 416i	Australia
Honda Integra	Acura Integra	North America
Honda Integra	Acura RSX	North America
Honda Legend	Acura Legend	North America
Honda Legend	Acura RL	North America
Honda Legend	Acura RLX	North America
Honda NSX	Acura NSX	North America, China, Kuwait
Honda Odyssey	Isuzu Oasis	United States
Honda Quint Integra	Rover Quintet	Australia
Hongqi HQ9	Bestune M9	China
Hyundai Accent	Bimantara Cakra	Indonesia
Hyundai Accent	Dodge Brisa	Venezuela
Hyundai Accent	Kia Qianlima	China
Hyundai Atos	Kia Visto	South Korea, Indonesia, Singapore, Thailand, Philippines
Hyundai Atos	Inokom Atos	Malaysia
Hyundai Atos	Dodge Atos	Mexico
Hyundai Getz	Dodge Brisa	Venezuela
Hyundai Elantra	Bimantara Nenggala	Indonesia
Hyundai Excel	Mitsubishi Precis	United States
Hyundai Getz	Dodge Brisa	Venezuela
Hyundai Getz	Inokom Getz	Malaysia
Hyundai Getz	Blade Electron EV	Australia, New Zealand
Hyundai i10	Inokom i10	Malaysia
Hyundai i10	Dodge i10	Mexico
Hyundai Lavita	Inokom Matrix	Malaysia
Hyundai Accent	Dodge Verna	Mexico
Hyundai Accent	Hyundai Avega	Indonesia
Hyundai Accent	Dodge Brisa	Venezuela
Hyundai Accent	Hyundai Verna	South Korea
Hyundai Santa Fe	Hawtai Shengdafei	China
Hyundai Santa Fe	JAC Rein	China
Hyundai Santa Fe	Inokom Santa Fe	Malaysia
Hyundai Sonata	Kia Optima	Worldwide until 2019
Hyundai Sonata	Kia Magentis	Outside the United States until 2010
Hyundai Sonata	Kia Lotze	South Korea from 2005 to 2010
Isuzu Aska	Holden Camira	New Zealand
Isuzu Aska	Chevrolet Aska	Chile, Ecuador
Isuzu D-Max	Chevrolet D-Max	Colombia, Ecuador, Venezuela
Isuzu D-Max	Chevrolet Luv D-Max	Chile
Isuzu D-Max	Chevrolet Colorado	North America, Chile
Isuzu D-Max	Holden Rodeo	Australia
Isuzu Fargo	Bedford/Vauxhall Midi (1st gen.)	United Kingdom
Isuzu Fargo	Bedford Seta (1st gen.)	Portugal
Isuzu Fargo	GME Midi (1st gen.)	Europe (except Portugal/UK)
Isuzu Fargo	Chevrolet WFR (1st gen.)	South America
Isuzu Fargo	Chevrolet WFR (2nd gen.)	South America
Isuzu Fargo	Nissan Caravan (3rd gen.) (Note: The Isuzu Fargo sold through Isuzu is a rebadged Caravan.)	Japan
Isuzu I-Mark	Chevrolet Spectrum	United States, Canada
Isuzu I-Mark	Chevrolet Gemini	Chile
Isuzu I-Mark	Geo Spectrum	United States
Isuzu I-Mark	Pontiac Sunburst	Canada
Isuzu Panther	Chevrolet Tavera	India, Indonesia
Isuzu Piazza	Holden Piazza	Australia
Isuzu Trooper	Holden Jackaroo	Australia, New Zealand
Isuzu Trooper	Subaru Bighorn	Japan
Isuzu Trooper	Chevrolet Trooper	Asia, South America
Isuzu Trooper	Opel Monterey	Europe
Isuzu Trooper	Acura SLX	United States
Isuzu Trooper	Vauxhall Monterey	United Kingdom
Isuzu Trooper	Holden Monterey	Australia and New Zealand
Isuzu Trooper	Honda Horizon (2nd gen.)	Japan
Isuzu Trooper	Ssangyong Korando Family (1st gen.)	Korea
Isuzu Trooper	Mekong Star 4WD (1st gen.)	Vietnam
Isuzu MU	Isuzu Rodeo	United States
Isuzu MU	Isuzu MU Wizard	Japan
Isuzu MU	Isuzu Cameo	Thailand
Isuzu MU	Isuzu Vega	Thailand
Isuzu MU	Chevrolet Frontera	Egypt
Isuzu MU	Chevrolet Rodeo	South America
Isuzu MU	Holden Frontera	Australia
Isuzu MU	Honda Jazz (not related to Honda Fit)	Japan
Isuzu MU	Honda Passport	United States
Isuzu MU	Opel Frontera	Europe
Isuzu MU	Vauxhall Frontera	United Kingdom
Isuzu Impulse	Geo Storm	United States
Isuzu Impulse	Asüna Sunfire	Canada
Isuzu TF PickUp	Chevrolet LUV	Chile, South America, North America, South Africa
Isuzu TF PickUp	Opel Campo	Europe
Isuzu TF PickUp	Vauxhall Brava	United Kingdom
Isuzu TF PickUp	Holden Rodeo	Australia
Isuzu TF PickUp	Bedford Brava	Portugal
JAC Refine S3	DR4	Italy
Jeep Liberty	Dodge Nitro	Australia, South Africa, Europe, Asia, Brazil, North America
Kia Avella	Ford Aspire/Festiva	United States, Thailand (as Aspire), Australasia (as Festiva)
Kia Carens	Naza Citra	Malaysia
Kia Carens	Naza Citra 2 Rondo	Malaysia
Kia Carnival	Naza Ria	Malaysia
Kia Forte	Naza Forte	Malaysia
Kia Picanto	Naza Suria	Malaysia
Kia Picanto	Naza Picanto	Malaysia
Kia Pride	Mazda 121/Ford Festiva	Korea, Japan, Australasia
Kia Pride	Kia Pop	Chile
Kia Pride	Saipa 141	Iran
Kia Pride	Saipa Nasim	Iran
Kia Pride	Saipa 132	Iran
Kia Sephia	Timor S515/S516	Indonesia
Kia Sorento	Naza Sorento	Malaysia
Kia Sorento	Huanghai Landscape F1	China
Kia Sorento	Pyeonghwa Ppeokkugi	North Korea
Landwind X2	JMEV E400	Electric Version
Lada Kalina	Datsun mi-DO	Russia
Lada Granta	Datsun on-DO	Russia
Lancia Delta	Saab-Lancia 600	Scandinavia
Lancia Delta	Chrysler Delta	United Kingdom, Ireland, Japan
Lancia Ypsilon	Chrysler Ypsilon	United Kingdom, Ireland, Japan
Land Rover Discovery	Honda Crossroad	Japan
Lotus Elan (M100)	Kia Elan/Vigato	South Korea/Japan
Mazda Bongo	Nissan Vanette Truck/Van (3rd/4th gen.)	Japan
Mazda Bongo	Mitsubishi Delica Truck/Van (1999–2011)	Japan
Mazda Bongo	Ford Econovan	Australia
Mazda Bongo Brawny	Mitsubishi Delica Cargo (1999–2010)	Japan
Mazda Bongo Brawny	Ford Econovan Maxi	Australia
Mazda Capella	Mazda 626	Worldwide
Mazda Capella	Ford Telstar	Asia, Australasia, South Africa
Mazda Demio/Mazda2	Scion iA (sedan only)	United States
Mazda Demio/Mazda2	Toyota Yaris iA	United States after 2017
Mazda Demio/Mazda2	Toyota Yaris	Canada, United States, Puerto Rico
Mazda Demio/Mazda2	Toyota Yaris R (sedan only)	Mexico
Mazda Familia	Ford Activa	Taiwan
Mazda Familia	Ford Laser	Asia, Australasia, South Africa, Latin America, Caribbean
Mazda Familia	Ford Lynx	Southeast Asia
Mazda Familia	Ford Tonic	South Africa
Mazda Familia	Sao Penza	United Kingdom
Mazda Premacy	Ford Ixion	Asia
Mazda Premacy	Ford i-Max	Taiwan
Mazda Premacy	Nissan Lafesta (2nd gen.)	Japan
Mazda Sentia (HD)	ɛ̃fini MS-9	Japan
Mazda Sentia (HD)	Mazda 929	North America, Australia
Mazda Sentia (HE)	Kia Enterprise	Europe, Asia, Oceania
Mazda Tribute	Ford Escape	United States, Canada, Japan, Australia
Mazda Tribute	Mercury Mariner	United States
Mercedes-Benz Citan/T-Class	Mercedes-Benz EQT/eCitan	Europe
Mercedes-Benz GLB	Mercedes-Benz EQB	Worldwide
Mercedes-Benz GLC	Mercedes-Benz EQC	Worldwide
Mercedes-Benz G-Class W460	G-Wagen W462 ELBO	Greece
Mercedes-Benz G-Class W460	Peugeot P4	France
Mercedes-Benz G-Class W460	Puch G	Austria, Switzerland, Yugoslavia (later Bosnia-Herzegovina, Croatia, Macedonia, Serbia, and Slovenia), Mongolia, and Eastern Europe
Mercedes-Benz G-Class W463	KSU Gazal-1	Middle East
Mercedes-Benz MB 100	SsangYong Istana	South Korea, Asia, Oceania
Mercedes-Benz MB 100	Daewoo Istana	South Korea, South America
Mercedes-Benz MB 100	Maxus Istana	China
Mercedes-Benz Sprinter	Dodge Sprinter	United States, Canada
Mercedes-Benz Sprinter	Freightliner Sprinter	United States, Canada
Mercedes-Benz Sprinter	Volkswagen Crafter (2006-2017)	Europe
Mitsubishi ASX	Mitsubishi RVR	Japan, Canada
Mitsubishi ASX	Mitsubishi Outlander Sport	United States
Mitsubishi ASX	Citroën C4 Aircross	Europe
Mitsubishi ASX	Peugeot 4008	Europe, Australia
Mitsubishi Dignity/Proudia (1st gen.)	Hyundai Equus	South Korea
Mitsubishi Eclipse	Eagle Talon	United States
Mitsubishi Eclipse	Plymouth Laser	United States
Mitsubishi eK	Nissan Otti	Japan
Mitsubishi eK Space	Nissan Dayz Roox	Japan
Mitsubishi Eterna	Proton Perdana (1st gen.)	Malaysia, Brunei, Singapore, United Kingdom
Mitsubishi Galant Lambda	Dodge Challenger	United States
Mitsubishi Galant Lambda	Plymouth Sapporo	United States
Mitsubishi Galant Lambda	Chrysler Scorpion	Australia
Mitsubishi GTO/3000GT	Dodge Stealth	North America
Mitsubishi i-MiEV	Citroën C-ZERO	Europe
Mitsubishi i-MiEV	Peugeot iOn	Europe
Mitsubishi i-MiEV	Mitsuoka Like	Japan
Mitsubishi Lancer	Plymouth Arrow	North America
Mitsubishi Lancer	Proton Inspira	Malaysia
Mitsubishi Minicab Truck/Van	Nissan Clipper Truck/Van (2003–2012)	Japan
Mitsubishi Minicab Truck/Van	Nissan NT100 Clipper (2012–2013)	Japan
Mitsubishi Minicab Truck/Van	Nissan NV100 Clipper (2012–2013)	Japan
Mitsubishi Mirage (2nd gen.)	Proton Saga	Malaysia, Bangladesh, New Zealand, Brunei, Malta, Sri Lanka, Ireland, United Kingdom, Singapore, Malawi, Jamaica
Mitsubishi Mirage (4th gen.)	Proton Wira	Malaysia, United Kingdom, Asia, The Middle East, Australasia, Europe, Africa, Latin America
Mitsubishi Mirage (4th gen.)	Proton Satria	Malaysia, United Kingdom, Australia, Europe
Mitsubishi Mirage (4th gen.)	Proton Putra	Malaysia, United Kingdom, Australia
Mitsubishi Mirage (4th gen.)	Proton Arena	Malaysia, United Kingdom, Australia, South Africa, Ireland
Mitsubishi Mirage (6th gen.)	Dodge Attitude	Mexico
Mitsubishi Outlander	Citroën C-Crosser	Europe
Mitsubishi Outlander	Peugeot 4007	Europe, Australia
Mitsubishi Pajero	Dodge Raider	North America
Mitsubishi Pajero	Mitsubishi Montero	North America, South America, Spain
Mitsubishi Pajero	Mitsubishi Shogun	United Kingdom
Mitsubishi Pajero Mini	Nissan Kix	Japan
Mitsubishi Raider	Dodge Dakota	United States
Mitsubishi Sigma	Lonsdale	United Kingdom
Mitsubishi Sigma	Chrysler Sigma	Australia
Mitsubishi Triton (5th gen.)	Fiat Fullback	Europe, Australia, Africa
Mitsubishi Triton (5th gen.)	Ram 1200	South America, Middle East
Mitsubishi Town Box	Nissan Clipper Rio (2007–2012)	Japan
Mitsubishi Town Box	Proton Juara	Malaysia
Morris Marina	Leyland Marina	United Kingdom, South Africa
Morris Marina	Austin Marina	United States, South Africa
Morris Marina	Austin America	Latin American
Nissan AD/NV150 AD	Mazda Familia Van (1994–2018)	Japan
Nissan AD/NV150 AD	Mitsubishi Lancer Cargo (2008–2019)	Japan
Nissan Armada	Infiniti QX56	North America
Nissan Bluebird	Nissan Stanza	North America, South Africa
Nissan Bluebird	Nissan Altima	North America
Nissan Bluebird Sylphy	Renault Samsung SM3 (G10)	South Korea, Chile
Nissan Cima	Infiniti Q45	North America
Nissan Cima	Infiniti Q70L	North America
Nissan Cima	Mitsubishi Dignity (2nd gen.)	Japan
Nissan Caravan	Datsun Urvan	Japan
Nissan Caravan	Nissan Homy	Japan
Nissan Elgrand	Isuzu Fargo Filly	Japan
Nissan Frontier	Suzuki Equator	Canada/United States
Nissan Fuga	Infiniti M/Q70	North America
Nissan Fuga	Mitsubishi Proudia (2nd gen.)	Japan
Nissan Juke	Infiniti ESQ	China
Nissan Leopard J Ferie	Infiniti J30	North America
Nissan Maxima	Infiniti I30/I35	North America
Nissan Micra	Renault Pulse	India
Nissan Mistral	Nissan Terrano II	Europe
Nissan Mistral	Ford Maverick	Europe
Nissan Navara	Mercedes-Benz X-Class	Europe, South America, Oceania, South Africa
Nissan Navara	Renault Alaskan	Europe, South America
Nissan Navara	Dongfeng Rich (1st gen.)	China, Asia
Nissan NV200	Chevrolet City Express	United States, Canada
Nissan NV200	Mitsubishi Delica D:3/Delica Van	Japan
Nissan NV200	Ashok Leyland STiLE	India
Nissan NV200	e-Wolf Delta 2 Shuttle	Europe
Nissan Patrol	Ford Maverick	Australia
Nissan Pathfinder	Infiniti QX4	North America
Nissan Pintara	Ford Corsair	Australia
Nissan Primera	Infiniti G20	North America
Nissan Pulsar/Cherry	Holden Astra	Australia
Nissan Pulsar/Cherry	Alfa Romeo Arna	Europe
Nissan Quest (1993-2002)	Mercury Villager	North America
Nissan Serena	Suzuki Landy (2007–2022)	Japan
Nissan Silvia (S14)	Nissan 240SX	Europe
Nissan Skyline	Infiniti G-series/Q40 (2002–2015)	North America, South Korea, Taiwan, Middle East
Nissan Skyline	Infiniti Q60 (2013–2015)	North America
Nissan Skyline	Infiniti Q50 (2013–2024)	Outside Japan
Nissan Skyline Crossover	Infiniti EX	North America, South Korea, Taiwan, Middle East
Nissan Sunny	Nissan Sentra	North America, New Zealand
Nissan Sunny	Renault Scala (N17)	India
Nissan Tiida	Nissan Versa	North America
Nissan Tiida	Nissan Latio	Singapore, Indonesia, Malaysia, Japan (sedan version, as Tiida Latio)
Nissan Vanette	Daewoo Vanette (1st-2nd gen.)	South Korea
Nissan Vanette	Yue Loong Bobby (1st gen.)	Taiwan
Nissan Xterra	Dongfeng Oting	China
Nissan X-Trail	Dongfeng Fengdu MX6	China
Oltcit Club	Citroën Axel	Europe
Opel Adam	Vauxhall Adam	United Kingdom
Opel Antara	Daewoo Winstorm MaXX	South Korea
Opel Antara	Saturn Vue	United States
Opel Antara	Vauxhall Antara	United Kingdom
Opel Antara	Chevrolet Captiva Sport	North America
Opel Antara	Holden Captiva MaXX (2006-2009)/Holden Captiva 5 (2009-2015)	Australia & New Zealand
Opel Antara	GMC Terrain	Middle East
Opel Astra	Holden Astra	Australia, New Zealand
Opel Astra	Holden Astra Sportwagon	Australia, New Zealand
Opel Ascona B	Vauxhall Cavalier	United Kingdom
Opel Ascona B	Chevrolet Ascona	South Africa
Opel Ascona C	Vauxhall Cavalier	United Kingdom
Opel Ascona C	Chevrolet Monza	Brazil
Opel Astra F (sedan)	Chevrolet Viva	Russia
Opel Astra F (sedan)	Chevrolet Astra	South America
Opel Astra F (sedan)	Opel Optima	Indonesia
Opel Astra F (hatchback)	Opel Kadett	South Africa
Opel Astra H (sedan)	Chevrolet Vectra (C)	Brazil
Opel Astra H (hatchback)	Holden Astra	Australia, New Zealand
Opel Astra H (hatchback)	Chevrolet Vectra GT	Brazil
Opel Astra H (hatchback)	Saturn Astra	United States, Canada
Opel Commodore C	Vauxhall Viceroy	United Kingdom
Opel Commodore C	Holden Commodore (VB)/(VC)	Australia, New Zealand
Opel Commodore C	Chevrolet Commodore	South Africa
Opel Corsa A	Vauxhall Nova	United Kingdom
Opel Corsa B	Buick Sail	China
Opel Corsa B	Chevrolet Corsa; Chevrolet Classic	South America
Opel Corsa B	Holden Barina	Australia, New Zealand
Opel Corsa B	Vauxhall Corsa	United Kingdom
Opel Corsa C	Vauxhall Corsa	United Kingdom
Opel Corsa C	Holden Barina	Australia, New Zealand
Opel Corsa C	Chevrolet Corsa	South America
Opel Cascada	Buick Cascada	North America
Opel Cascada	Holden Cascada	Australia
Opel Cascada	Vauxhall Cascada	United Kingdom
Opel Combo	Chevrolet Combo	Chile, Argentina
Opel Combo	Holden Combo	Australia
Opel Combo	Vauxhall Combo	United Kingdom
Opel Insignia	Holden Insignia	Australia, New Zealand
Opel Insignia	Holden Commodore ZB	Australia, New Zealand
Opel Insignia	Vauxhall Insignia	United Kingdom
Opel Insignia Country Tourer	Buick Regal TourX	North America
Opel Insignia Country Tourer	Holden Commodore Tourer	Australia, New Zealand
Opel Insignia Country Tourer	Vauxhall Insignia Country Tourer	United Kingdom
Opel Kadett C	Vauxhall Chevette	United Kingdom
Opel Kadett C	Isuzu Gemini	Japan
Opel Kadett C	Holden Gemini	Australia
Opel Kadett D	Vauxhall Astra	United Kingdom
Opel Kadett E	Vauxhall Astra	United Kingdom
Opel Kadett E	Chevrolet Kadett	South America
Opel Kadett E	Pontiac LeMans	United States, New Zealand
Opel Kadett E	Asüna SE/GT	Canada
Opel Kadett E	Passport Optima	Canada
Opel Kadett E	Daewoo Lemans/Racer	Asia, Eastern Europe, South America, Australia
Opel Kadett E (sedan)	Vauxhall Belmont	United Kingdom
Opel Kadett E (sedan)	Opel Monza	South Africa
Opel Mokka	Buick Encore	North America, China
Opel Monza	Vauxhall Royale Coupé	United Kingdom
Opel Omega A	Vauxhall Carlton	United Kingdom
Opel Omega A	Chevrolet Omega	Brazil
Opel Omega B1	Vauxhall Omega	United Kingdom
Opel Omega B1	Cadillac Catera	North America
Opel Rekord C	Ranger	South Africa
Opel Rekord D	Chevrolet 3800	South Africa
Opel Rekord D	Ranger	Belgium, Netherlands, Switzerland
Opel Rekord E	Vauxhall Carlton	United Kingdom
Opel Rekord E1	Chevrolet Rekord	South Africa
Opel Rekord E2	Opel Commodore	South Africa
Opel Senator	Vauxhall Royale (1979-1983)/Vauxhall Senator (1983-1994)	United Kingdom
Opel Senator	Chevrolet Senator	South Africa
Opel Tigra A	Vauxhall Tigra	United Kingdom
Opel Tigra A	Chevrolet Tigra	South America
Opel Tigra A	Holden Tigra	Australia
Opel Vectra A	Vauxhall Cavalier	United Kingdom
Opel Vectra A	Chevrolet Vectra	South America
Opel Vectra A	Holden Vectra	New Zealand
Opel Vectra B	Vauxhall Vectra	United Kingdom
Opel Vectra B	Chevrolet Vectra	South America
Opel Vectra B	Holden Vectra	Australia, New Zealand
Opel Vectra C	Vauxhall Vectra	United Kingdom
Opel Vectra C	Chevrolet Vectra	South America
Opel Vectra C	Holden Vectra	Australia, New Zealand
Opel Zafira	Subaru Traviq	Japan
Opel Zafira	Chevrolet Zafira	South America, Southeast Asia
Opel Zafira	Holden Zafira	Australia
Opel Zafira	Vauxhall Zafira	United Kingdom
Peugeot 104	Citroën LN	Europe
Peugeot 104	Talbot Samba	United Kingdom
Peugeot 107/108	Citroën C1	Europe
Peugeot 107/108	Toyota Aygo	Europe
Peugeot 206	Naza 206 Bestari	Malaysia
Peugeot 206	IKCO Runna	Iran
Peugeot 206	Wallys 719	Tunesia
Peugeot 405	Peugeot Pars/Khazar 406	Iran (Pars), Azerbaijan (Khazar 406)
Peugeot 806	Citroën Evasion	Europe
Peugeot 806	Fiat Ulysse	Europe
Peugeot 806	Lancia Zeta	Europe
Peugeot 807	Citroën C8	Europe
Peugeot 807	Fiat Ulysse	Europe
Peugeot 807	Lancia Phedra	Europe
Plymouth Valiant	Chrysler Valiant	Australia, South Africa
Pontiac Vibe	Toyota Voltz	Japan
Proton GEN•2	Youngman Lotus L3 Hatch/GT Hatch	China
Proton Persona	Youngman Lotus L3 Sedan	China
Renault Captur	Renault Samsung QM3	South Korea (shared 2606mm wheelbase)
Renault Clio Symbol	Nissan Platina	Mexico, Chile
Renault Clio	Mitsubishi Colt	Europe
Renault Dauphine	Alfa Romeo Dauphine	Europe
Renault Fluence	Renault Samsung SM3 (L38)	South Korea (shared 2702mm wheelbase)
Renault Fluence	Dongfeng Fengnuo E300 EV	China (shared 2702mm wheelbase)
Renault Kangoo I	Nissan Kubistar	Europe, Latin America
Renault Kangoo I	Elect'road	Europe
Renault Kangoo II	Nissan NV250	Europe
Renault Kwid	Dongfeng Aeolus EX1	China
Renault Kwid	Dongfeng Fengguang E1	China
Renault Kwid	Dongfeng Fothring T1	China
Renault Koleos I	Renault Samsung QM5	South Korea (shared 2690mm wheelbase)
Renault Koleos II	Renault Samsung QM6	South Korea
Renault Master	Opel Movano	Europe
Renault Master	Vauxhall Movano	United Kingdom
Renault Safrane	Renault Samsung SM5 (A34R)	South Korea (shared 2760mm wheelbase)
Renault Samsung SM3	Nissan Almera Classic	Russia
Renault Samsung SM3	Renault Scala	Mexico
Renault Scala	Renault Samsung SM3 (N17)	South Korea
Renault Scala	Nissan Almera, Sunny and Versa	worldwide
Renault Talisman	Renault Samsung SM6	South Korea (shared 2810mm wheelbase)
Renault Twizy	Nissan NMC (New Mobility Concept)	Europe
Renault Trafic	Opel Arena (1st gen.)	Europe
Renault Trafic	Vauxhall Arena (1st gen.)	United Kingdom
Renault Trafic	Winnebago LeSharo (1st gen.)	United States, Canada, Mexico
Renault Trafic	Inokom Permas (1st gen.)	Malaysia
Renault Trafic	Tata Winger (1st gen.)	South Asia
Renault Trafic	Chevrolet Trafic/Space Van (1st gen.)	South America
Renault Trafic	Nissan Primastar (2nd gen.)	Europe
Renault Trafic	Opel Vivaro (2nd gen.)	Europe
Renault Trafic	Vauxhall Vivaro (2nd gen.)	Europe
Renault Trafic	Fiat Talento (3rd gen.)	Europe
Renault Trafic	Opel Vivaro (3rd gen.)	Europe
Renault Trafic	Vauxhall Vivaro (3rd gen.)	Europe
Renault Trafic	Nissan NV300 (3rd gen.)	Europe
Renault Trafic	Mitsubishi Express (3rd gen.)	Australia, New Zealand
Renault Twingo III	Smart Forfour II	worldwide (shared 2490mm wheelbase)
Renault 21	Eagle Medallion	United States, Canada
Rover 825/827/Sterling	Sterling 825/827	United States
Rover 75	Roewe 750	China
Rover 75	MG 7	China
Rover 75	MG ZT	United Kingdom
SEAT Arosa	Volkswagen Lupo	Europe
SEAT Córdoba Mk1	Volkswagen Polo Classic	Europe, South Africa
SEAT Córdoba Mk1	Volkswagen Derby	Latin America
SEAT Córdoba Mk1	FAW-VW City-Golf	China
SEAT Ibiza (021A)	Nanjing Yuejin Soyat	China
SEAT Ibiza (6K)	Volkswagen Polo Playa	South Africa
SEAT Inca	Volkswagen Caddy	Europe
SEAT Malaga	SEAT Gredos	Greece
Škoda Felicia Pickup	Volkswagen Caddy	Europe
Škoda Superb	Volkswagen Passat Lingyu	China
SsangYong Korando	Daewoo Korando	Korea, Australia, Europe
SsangYong Musso	Daewoo Musso	Korea, Australia, Europe
SsangYong Musso	Mercedes Musso	Asia
SsangYong Rexton	Mahindra Alturas G4	India
Statesman	Chevrolet Constantia	South Africa
Statesman	Chevrolet Caprice Classic	South Africa
Statesman	Holden Statesman	New Zealand
Statesman	Chevrolet 350	New Zealand
Statesman	Isuzu Statesman De Ville	Japan
Statesman	Chevrolet De Ville	Thailand
Studebaker (1957–58)	Packard (1957–58)	United States
Studebaker Hawk	Packard Hawk	United States
Subaru Forester	Chevrolet Forester	India
Subaru Impreza	Saab 9-2X	North America
Subaru Legacy	Isuzu Aska	Japan
Suzuki Alto	Maruti Alto	India
Suzuki Alto	Chevrolet Alto	Colombia, Venezuela, Ecuador
Suzuki Alto	Nissan Pino	Japan
Suzuki Alto	Nissan Pixo	Europe (some)
Suzuki Alto Lapin	Mazda Spiano	Japan
Suzuki APV	Mitsubishi Maven	Indonesia
Suzuki Carry	Nissan NT100 Clipper (2013–2024)	Japan
Suzuki Cultus	Holden Barina	Australia
Suzuki Cultus	Suzuki Forsa	United States, Canada
Suzuki Cultus	Suzuki Swift	United States, Canada
Suzuki Cultus	Geo Metro	United States, Canada
Suzuki Cultus	Pontiac Firefly	Canada
Suzuki Cultus	Chevrolet Sprint	United States, Canada, Chile
Suzuki Cultus	Subaru Justy (2nd gen.)	Europe
Suzuki Ertiga	Mazda VX-1	Indonesia
Suzuki Ertiga	Proton Ertiga	Malaysia
Suzuki Every	Nissan NV100 Clipper (2013–2024)	Japan
Suzuki Every Wagon	Nissan NV100 Clipper Rio	Japan
Suzuki Fronté	Maruti 800	India
Suzuki Grand Vitara (3rd gen.)	Chevrolet Grand Vitara SZ	Ecuador
Suzuki Ignis	Holden Cruze	Australia, New Zealand
Suzuki Ignis	Chevrolet Cruze	Asia
Suzuki Ignis	Subaru Justy (3rd gen.)	Europe
Suzuki Jimny (2nd gen.)	Suzuki Samurai	United States
Suzuki Jimny (2nd gen.)	Suzuki Sierra	Australia
Suzuki Jimny (2nd gen.)	Holden Drover	Australia
Suzuki Jimny (2nd gen.)	Maruti Gypsy	India
Suzuki Jimny (3rd gen.)	Chevrolet Jimny	Colombia, Ecuador, Venezuela
Suzuki Jimny (3rd gen.)	Mazda AZ-Offroad	Japan
Suzuki Kei	Mazda Laputa	Japan
Suzuki MR Wagon	Nissan Moco	Japan
Suzuki Palette	Mazda Flair Wagon (1st gen.)	Japan
Suzuki Palette	Nissan Roox (1st gen.)	Japan
Suzuki Splash	Opel/Vauxhall Agila B	Europe
Suzuki Splash	Maruti Suzuki Ritz	India
Suzuki SX4	Fiat Sedici	Europe
Suzuki Vitara	Mazda Proceed Levante	Japan
Suzuki Vitara	Geo Tracker	United States, Canada
Suzuki Vitara	Pontiac Sunrunner	Canada
Suzuki Vitara	Asüna Sunrunner	Canada
Suzuki Vitara	Chevrolet Tracker	Canada
Suzuki Vitara	GMC Tracker	Canada
Suzuki Vitara/Escudo	Chevrolet Vitara	South America
Suzuki Vitara Brezza	Toyota Urban Cruiser (2020)	India
Suzuki Wagon R	Mazda AZ-Wagon	Japan
Suzuki Wagon R-Wide/Wagon R+	Opel/Vauxhall Agila	Europe
Suzuki Wagon R-Wide/Wagon R+	Chevrolet Wagon R	Colombia, Ecuador, Venezuela
Tata Indica	Rover CityRover	United Kingdom
Toyota 86	Scion FR-S	North America
Toyota 86	Subaru BRZ (1st gen.)	Worldwide
Toyota Alphard	Lexus LM (1st gen.)	China, Southeast Asia, Russia, Ukraine
Toyota Altezza	Lexus IS	North America, Europe
Toyota Aristo	Lexus GS	North America, Europe
Toyota Auris	Scion iM	United States, Canada
Toyota Auris	Toyota Corolla iM	United States, Canada
Toyota Aygo	Citroën C1	Europe
Toyota Aygo	Peugeot 107/108	Europe
Toyota bB	Scion xB (1st gen.)	United States
Toyota bB	Daihatsu Coo	Japan
Toyota bB	Subaru Dex	Japan
Toyota Camry	Toyota Scepter (XV10)	Japan
Toyota Camry	Toyota Vienta	Australia
Toyota Camry	Holden Apollo	Australia
Toyota Camry	Daihatsu Altis	Japan
Toyota Camry Prominent/Vista	Lexus ES 250	United States
Toyota Celsior	Lexus LS	North America
Toyota Corolla	Holden Nova	Australia
Toyota Corolla	Geo Prizm	United States
Toyota Corolla	Chevrolet Prizm	United States
Toyota Corolla	Chevrolet Nova	United States, Canada
Toyota Corolla	Suzuki Swace	Europe
Toyota Corolla Rumion	Scion xB (2nd gen.)	North America
Toyota Grand HiAce	Jinbei Granse	Asia
Toyota Harrier	Lexus RX	North America, Europe, Asia, Middle East
Toyota Hilux	Volkswagen Taro	Europe
Toyota iQ	Scion iQ	United States
Toyota iQ	Aston Martin Cygnet	United Kingdom
Toyota iQ	Singulato iC3	China
Toyota Ist	Scion xA	United States
Toyota Ist	Toyota Urban Cruiser	Europe, Latin America
Toyota Ist	Scion xD	United States
Toyota Land Cruiser	Lexus LX	Worldwide
Toyota Matrix	Pontiac Vibe	United States
Toyota Matrix	Toyota Voltz	Japan
Toyota Noah (3rd gen.)	Toyota Esquire	Japan
Toyota Prius V	Daihatsu Mebius	Japan
Toyota Ractis	Toyota Verso-S	Europe
Toyota Ractis	Subaru Trezia	Japan
Toyota Soarer	Lexus SC	North America, Europe
Toyota Sprinter	Geo Prizm	United States
Toyota Vitz (2nd gen.)	Daihatsu Charade	Europe
Toyota Windom	Lexus ES	North America
Vauxhall Cavalier Mark I	Chevrolet Chevair	South Africa
Vauxhall Viva	Chevrolet Firenza	South Africa
Volkswagen Santana	Ford Versailles	Brazil
Volkswagen Santana	Ford Galaxy	Argentina
Volkswagen Sharan	SEAT Alhambra	Europe
Volkswagen Up	SEAT Mii	Europe
Volkswagen Up	Škoda Citigo	Europe
Volkswagen Vento	Škoda Rapid (2011)	India
Wuling Hongguang	Chevrolet Enjoy	India
Zhongxing Admiral	Toyota 4Runner (Third Generation)	China

== See also ==
- Car platform
- General Motors Companion Make Program
- Brand
- Rebranding
- Joint Venture
- List of Chrysler platforms
- List of Fiat platforms
- List of Ford platforms
- List of GM platforms
- List of Hyundai-Kia platforms
- List of Mitsubishi platforms
- List of Nissan platforms
- List of Toyota platforms
- List of Volkswagen Group platforms
