= Ram ProMaster City =

The Ram ProMaster City is an automobile nameplate used by Stellantis for its RAM brand since 2015 for two different van models:

- A rebadged version of the Fiat Doblò produced between 2015 and 2022
- A rebadged version of the Citroën Jumpy / Fiat Scudo to be produced starting in 2027
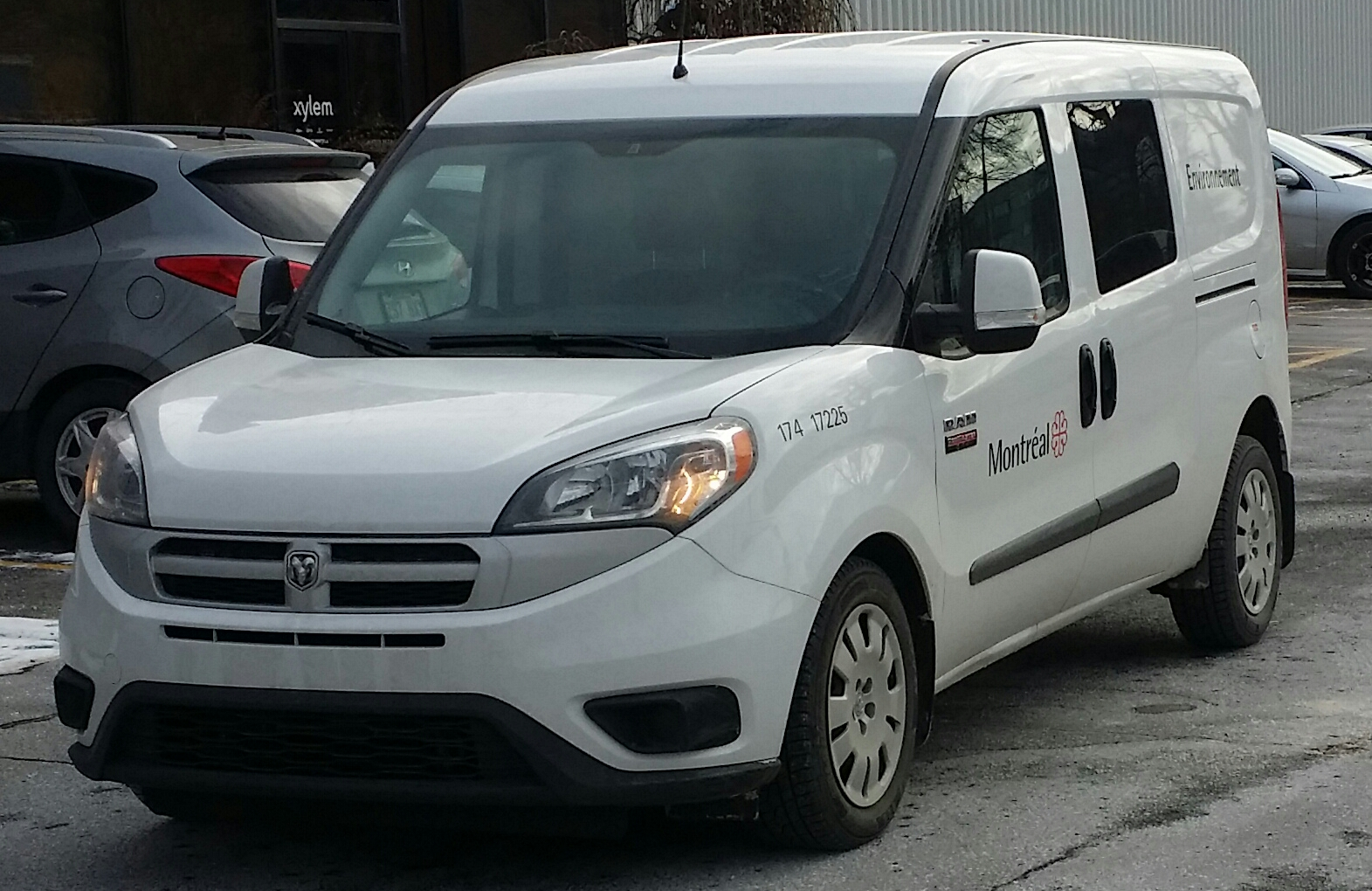
2015 Ram ProMaster City Tradesman (USA & Canada)
