= Nissan Latio =

Automotive nameplate by Nissan

The Nissan Latio (Japanese: 日産・ラティオ, Hepburn: Nissan Ratio) is an automobile nameplate used by the Japanese automobile manufacturer Nissan between 2004 and 2016 for two small car models:

- Nissan Latio/Tiida Latio, a subcompact/compact car sold in Southeast Asia and Japan from 2004 to 2012
- Nissan Latio, a rebadged Nissan Almera sold in Japan as a captive import from 2012 to 2016
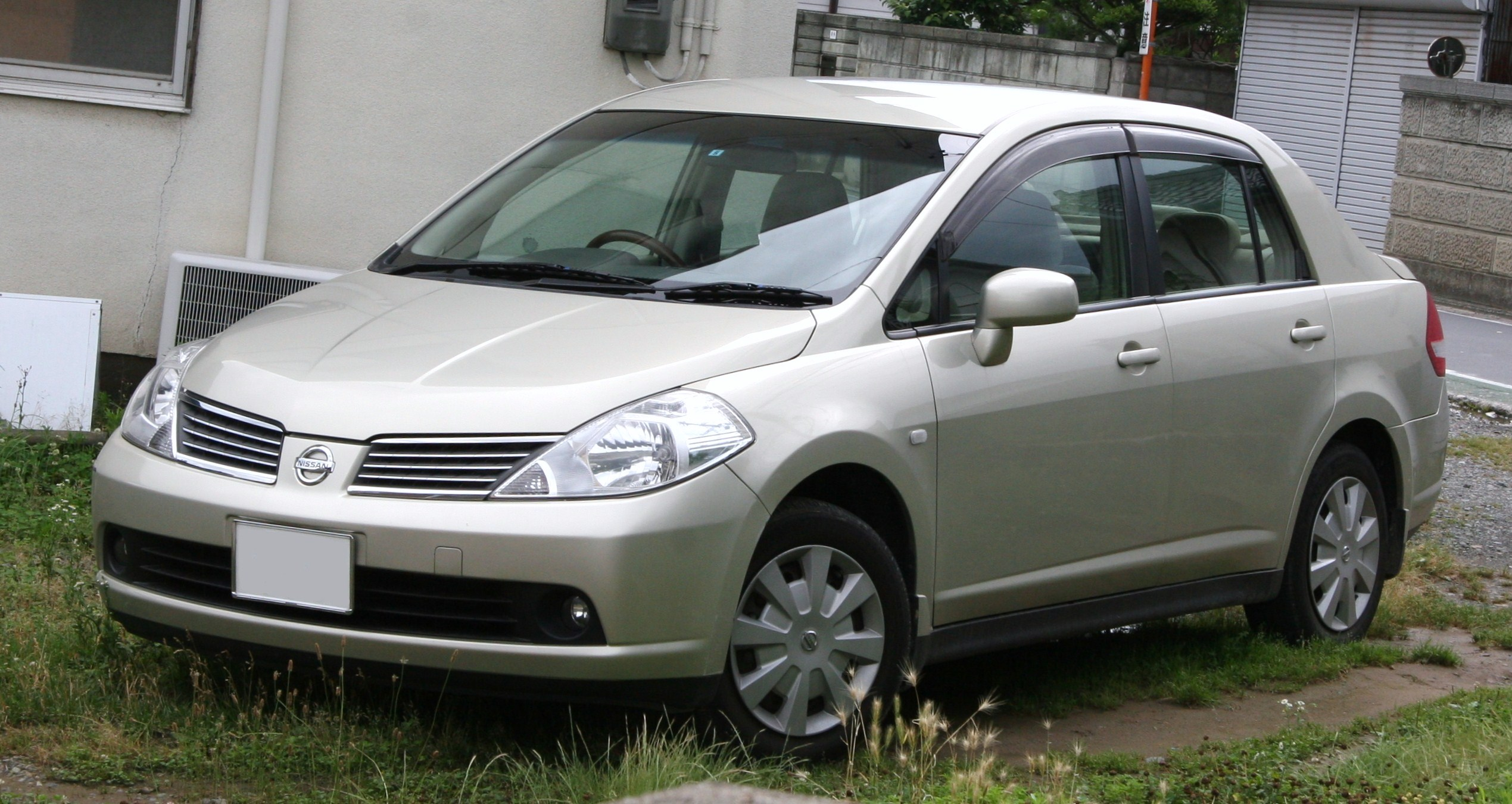
2004–2012 Nissan Tiida Latio sedan (Japan)

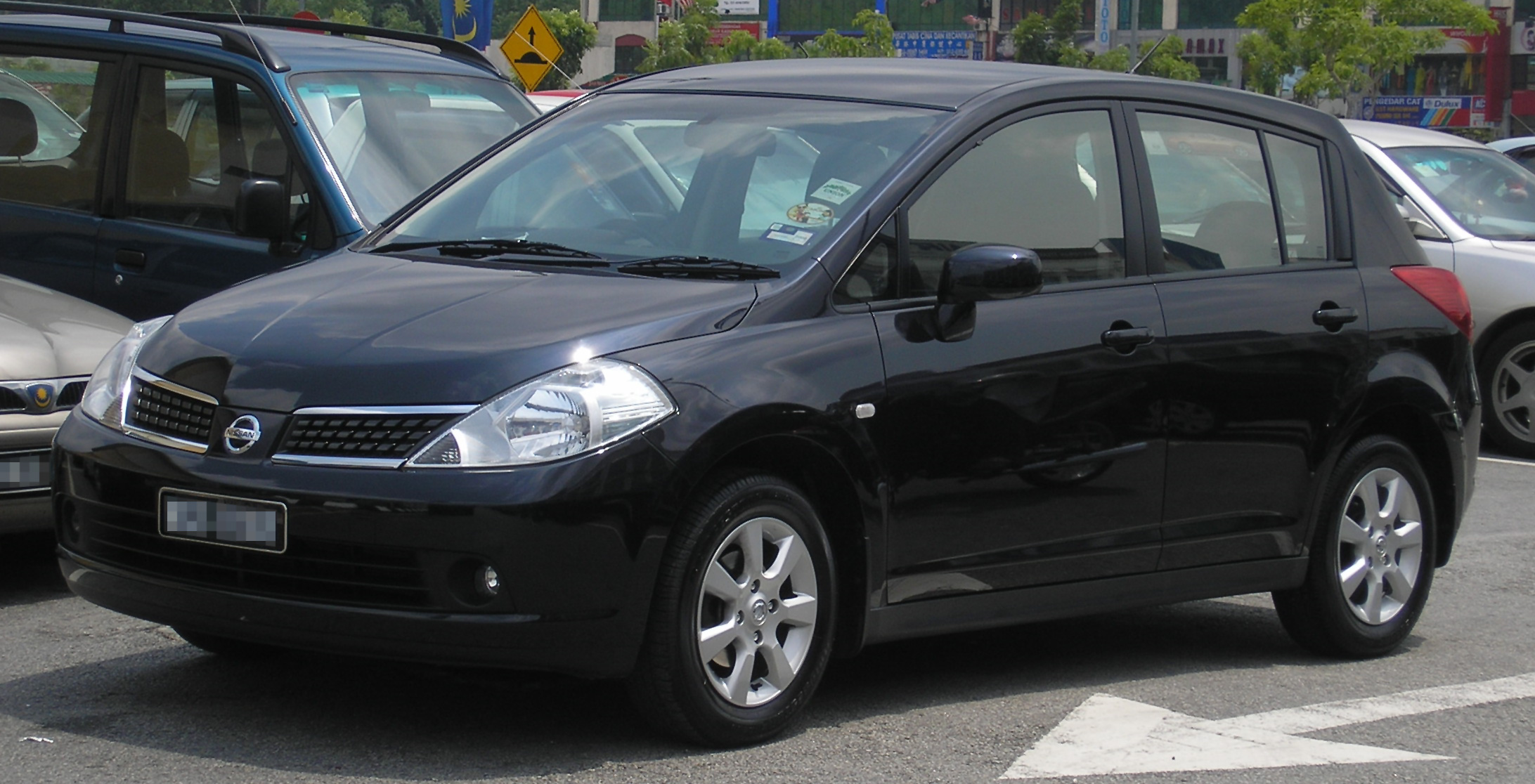
2004–2012 Nissan Latio hatchback (Malaysia)

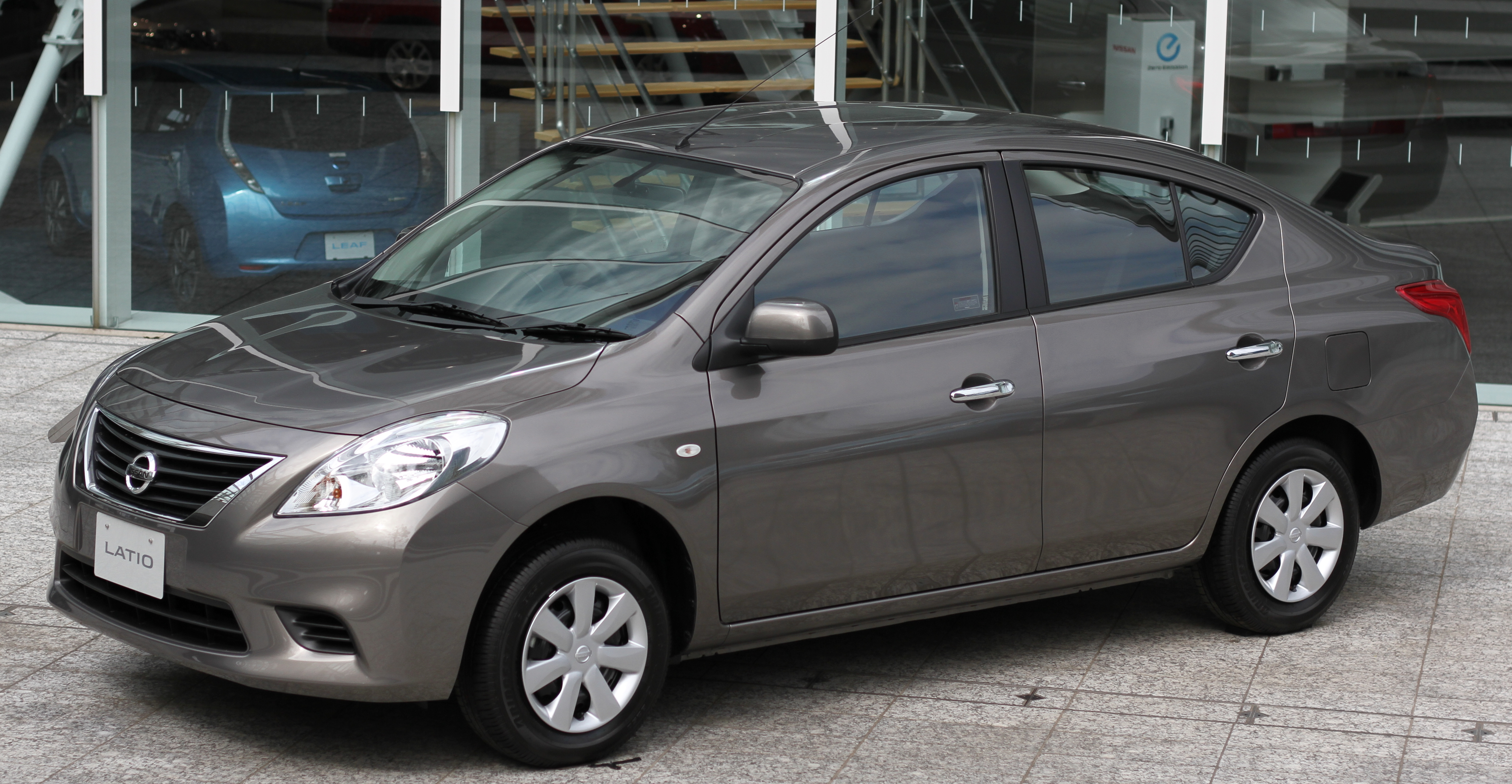
2012–2016 Nissan Latio (Japan)
