= Jiabao V80 =

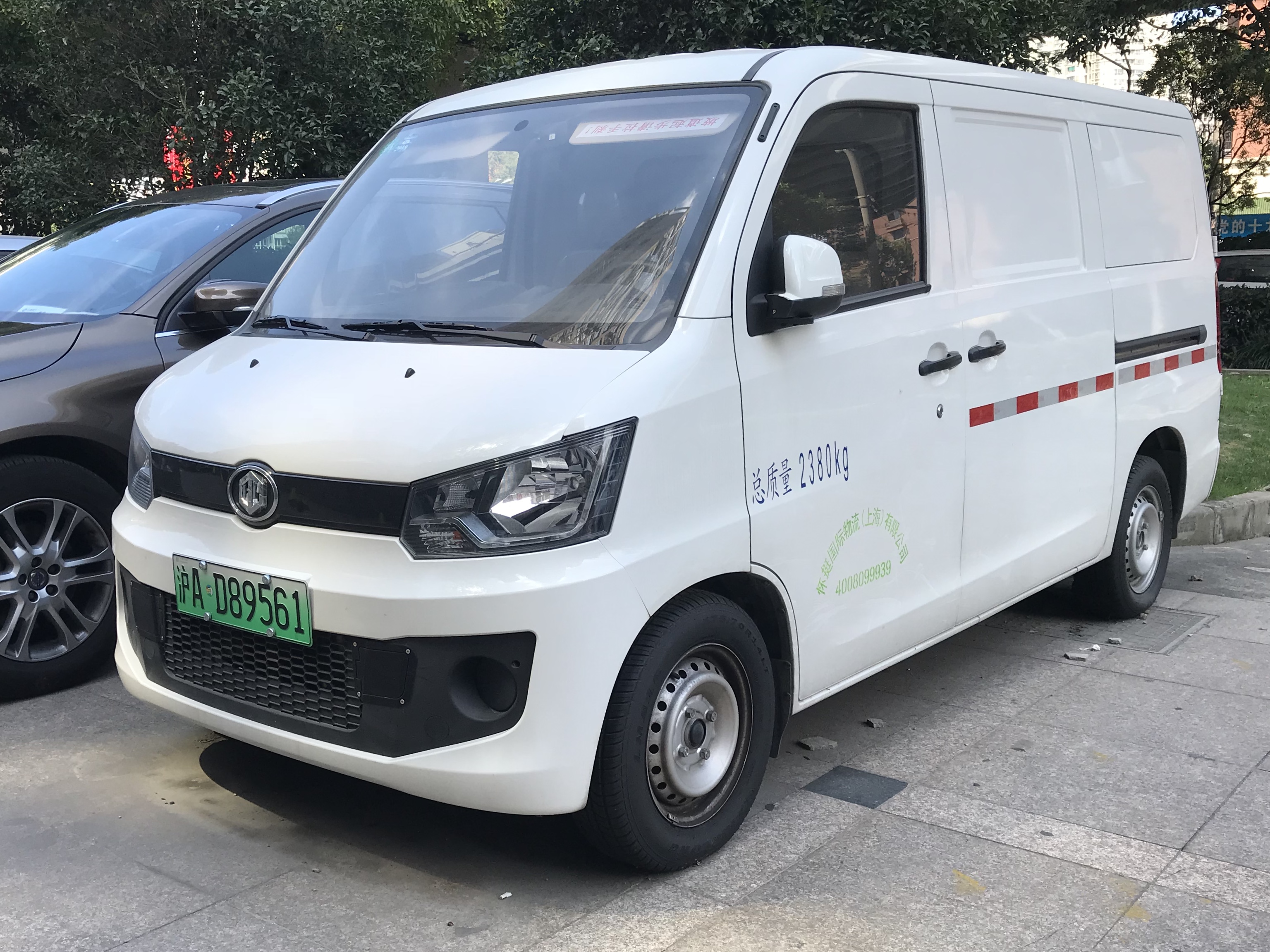

Overview
- Manufacturer: FAW Jilin (FAW Group)
- Also called: FAW Jiefang T80 (pickup); FAW Jiefang T90 (pickup); FAW Mamut T80; Higer H4E (Rebadged electric microvan); NAC Chang Da H9 (Rebadged electric microvan); Pyeonghwa Samcheonri 0711 (North Korea)
- Production: 2013-present

Body and chassis
- Class: Microvan
- Body style: Microvan

Powertrain
- Engine: 1.3 L CA4GX13 I4; 1.5 L CA4GX15 I4
- Transmission: 5 speed manual

Dimensions
- Wheelbase: 2,700 mm (106.3 in)
- Length: 4,202 mm (165.4 in)
- Width: 1,685 mm (66.3 in)
- Height: 1,910 mm (75.2 in)

The Jiabao V80 is a five- to eight-seater Microvan made by FAW Jilin under the Jiabao sub-brand since 2013.

== Overview ==
Launched in 2013 during the 2013 Shanghai Auto Show, the Jiabao V80 was powered by either a 1.3 liter Inline-four petrol engine or a 1.5 liter Inline-four petrol engine.

The Jiabao V80 was priced between 40,900 yuan and 53,900 yuan.

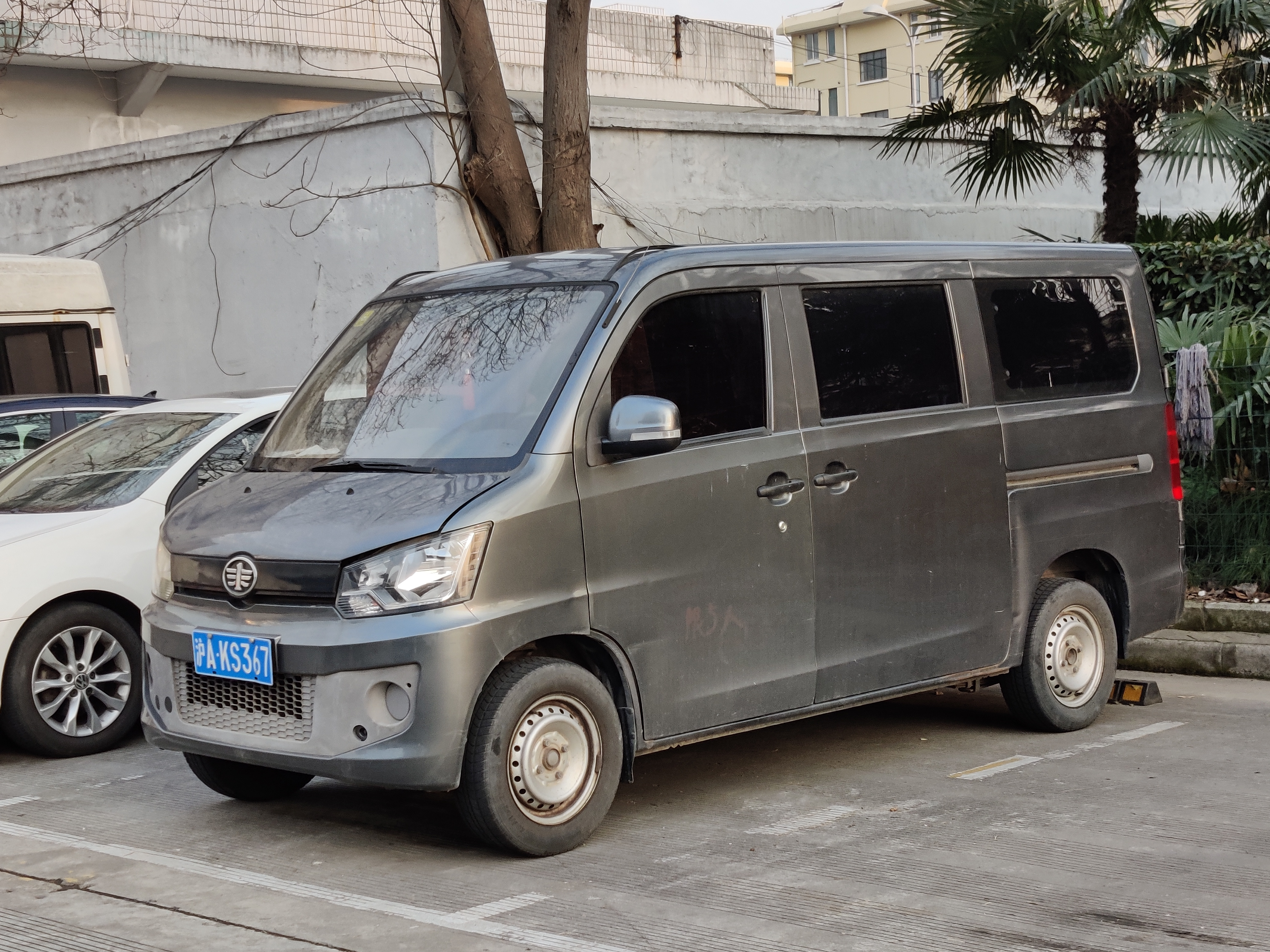
FAW Jiabao V80 front

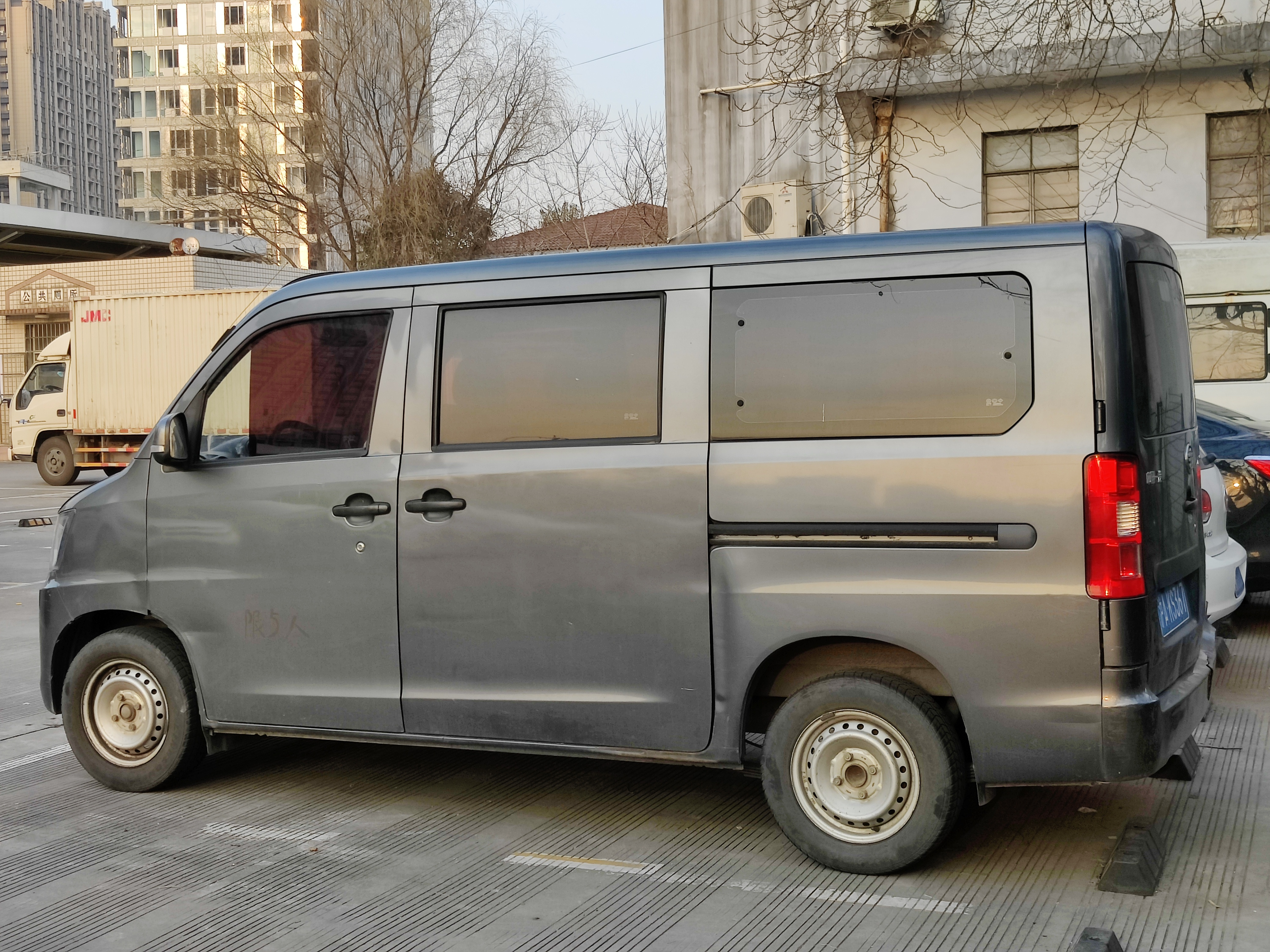
FAW Jiabao V80 side

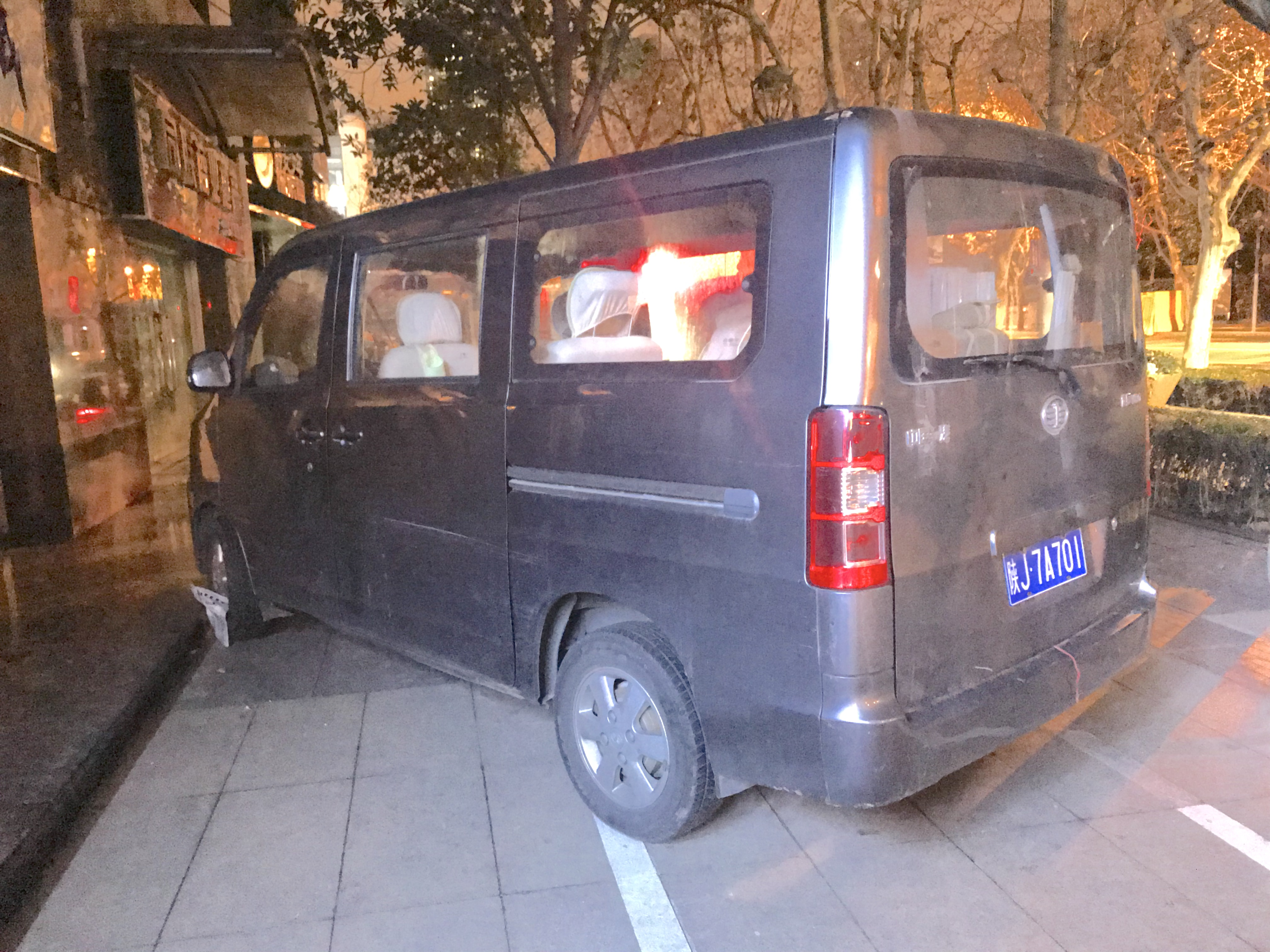
FAW Jiabao V80 rear

=== FAW Jiefang T80/T90 ===
The Jiefang T80 and Jiefang T90 (解放T80/ T90) are the pickup versions of the Jiabao V80 microvan. The Jiefang T80 is available as a regular single cab or double cab pickup versions, while the Jiefang T90 is the heavy duty version. The T80 was priced from 34,900 yuan to 40,400 yuan, while the T90 was priced from 46,500 yuan to 50,500 yuan.

Engine options of the Jiefang T80 includes a 1.3-liter or a 1.5-liter inline-four petrol engine. The Jiefang T90 only has the larger engine option.

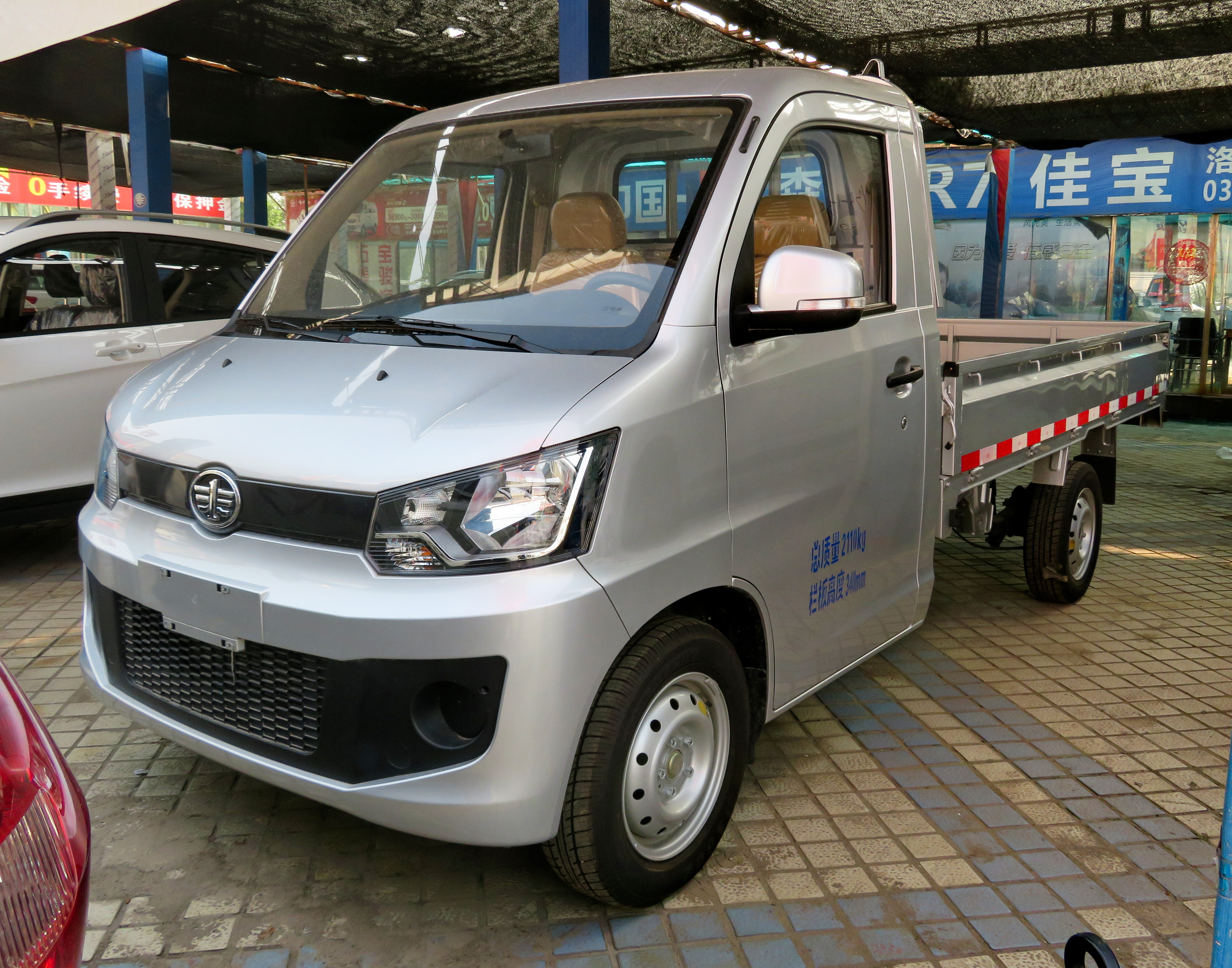
FAW Jiefang T80

== Higer H4E ==
The Higer H4E is the rebadged electric version of the FAW Jiabao V80. Codenamed KLQ5020XXYEV5, the Higer H4E is only available as a panel van, and comes in either a 2-seat version or a 2+3 seat version.

The H4E is powered by a 60 kW and 250 N⋅m (184 lb⋅ft) electric motor placed in the rear, equipped with a 40.7 kWh battery capable of a range of 255 km (158 mi) with fast charging taking 2.5 hours and regular charging 12 hours. The Higer H4E was priced from 223,000 yuan to 258,000 yuan.

== NAC Chang Da H9 ==
The NAC Chang Da H9 (畅达 H9) is another rebadged electric version of the FAW Jiabao V80 produced by Chang Da, NEV sub-brand of Nanjing Automobile and SAIC.

Established in 2009, Chang Da has been developing electric light logistics vans for "the last mile" delivery. The first product, NAC Chang Da H9 is based on the structure of FAW Jiabao V80 and took three years to develop before being launched in 2017. The Chang Da H9 could be either bought or leased in fleets.

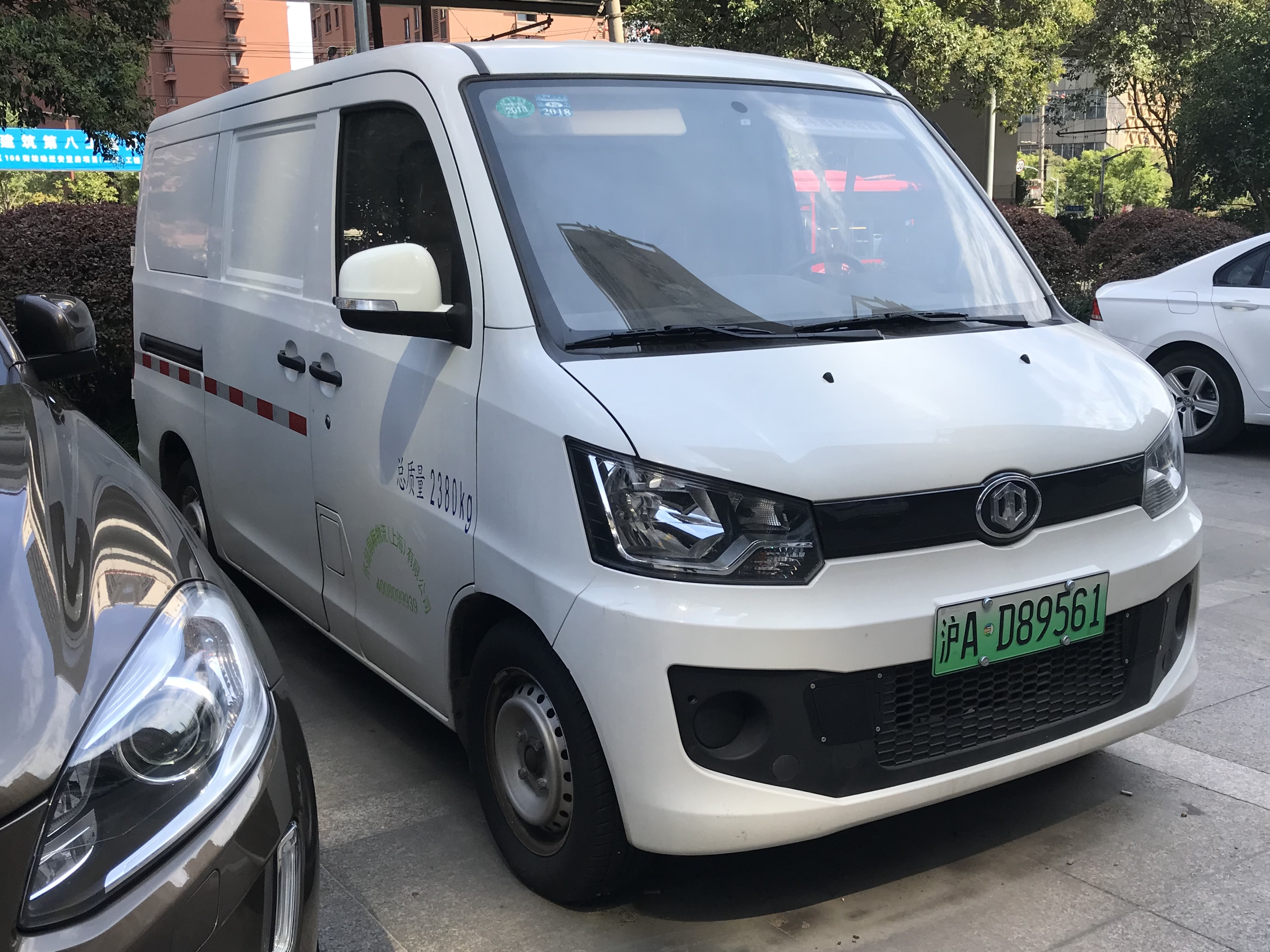
NAC Chang Da H9 in Shanghai

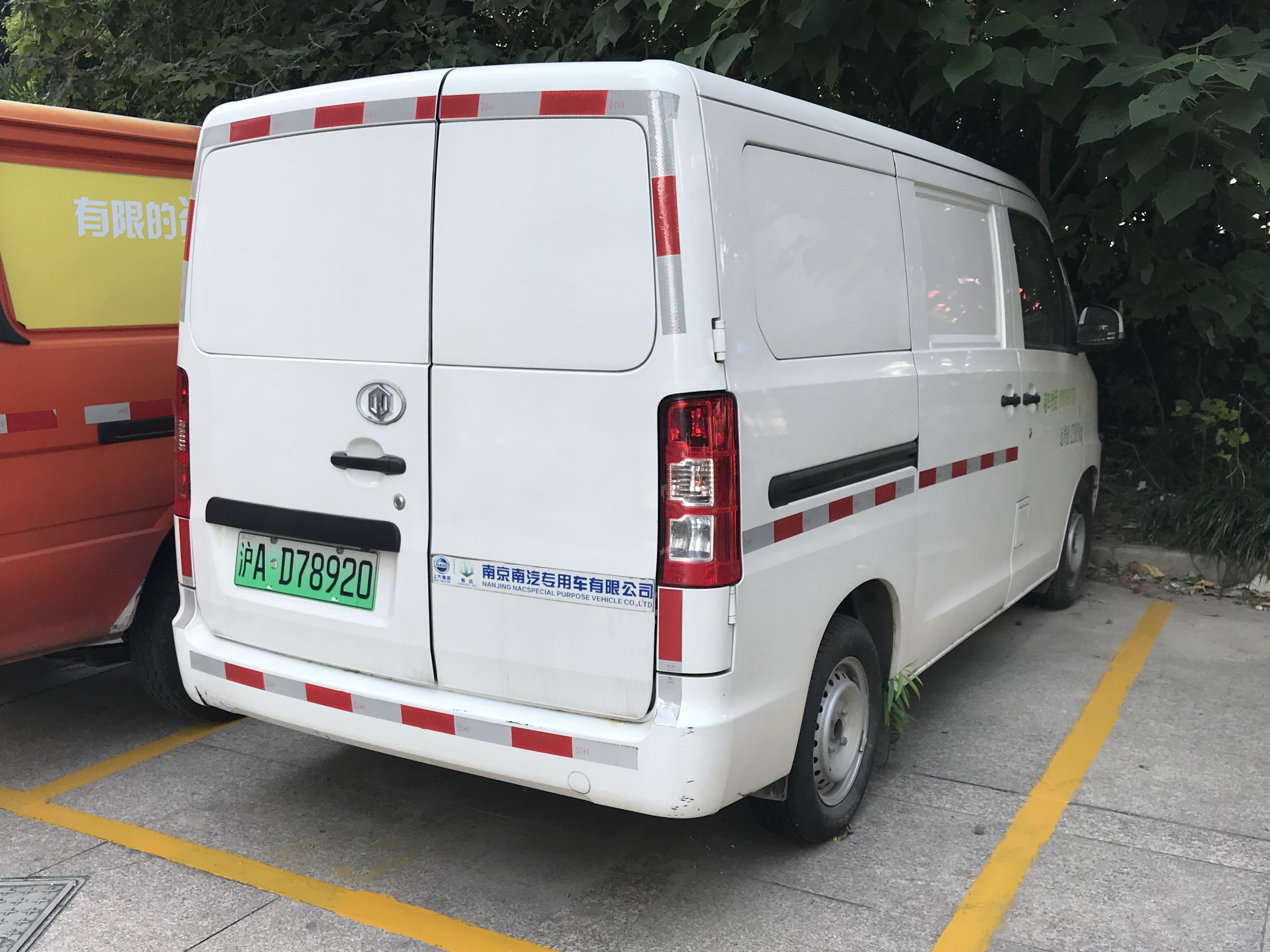
Chang Da H9 rear with the SAIC and Nanjing NAC label
