= Maxus V70 =

Chinese van

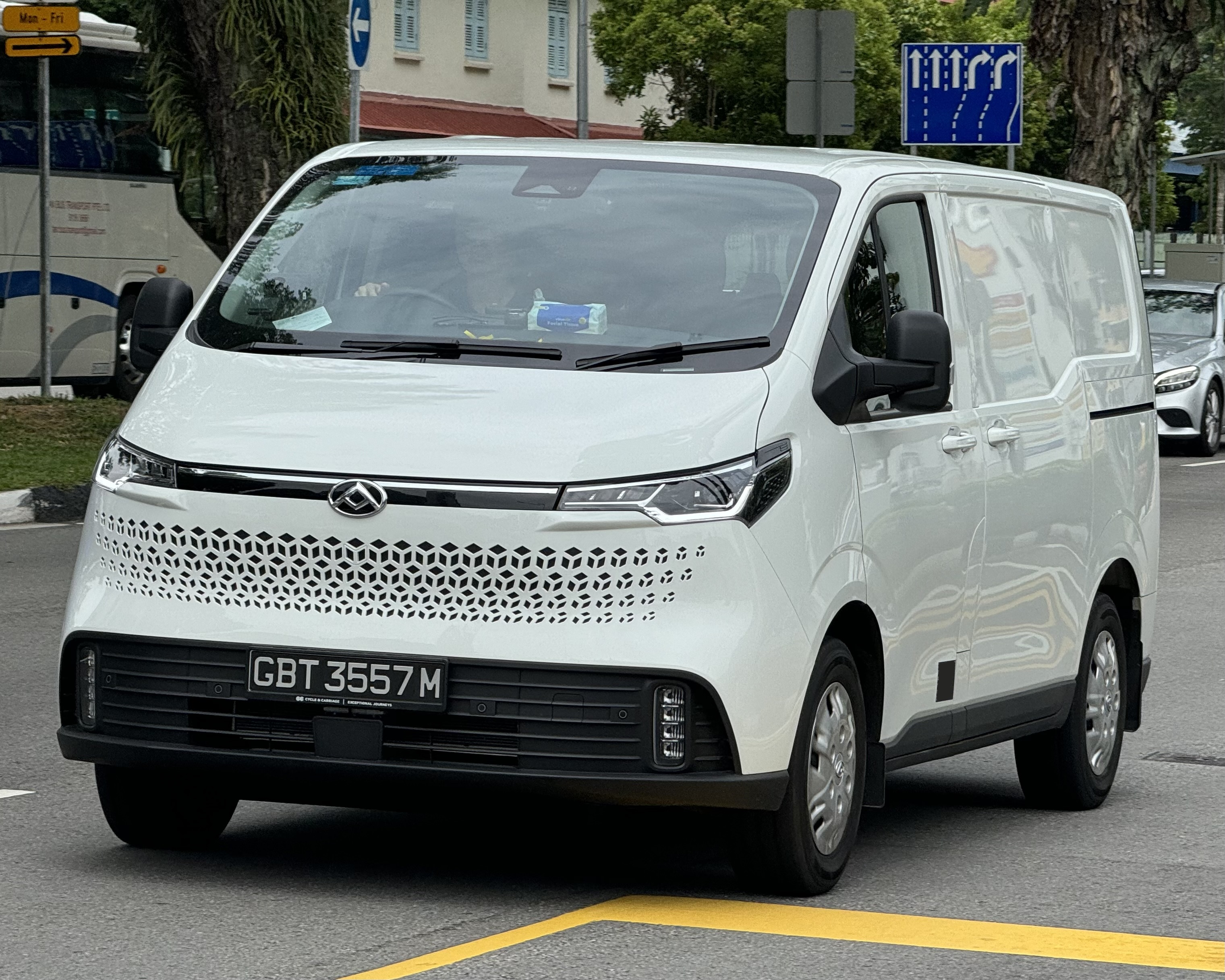

Overview
- Manufacturer: Maxus (SAIC Motor)
- Also called: Maxus Deliver 7; Maxus eDeliver 7 (electric version); LDV Deliver 7 (Australia); LDV eDeliver 7 (electric version in Australia); Iveco Fidato; Chevrolet Express Max (Mexico); SKM M9 (Russia)
- Production: 2023–2026 (Maxus V70/EV70); 2023–present (Iveco Fidato); 2024–present (export)
- Assembly: China: Wuxi; Russia: Toliatti

Body and chassis
- Class: Light commercial vehicle
- Body style: 4-door van; 4-door minibus
- Layout: Transverse front engine, front wheel drive

Powertrain
- Engine: 2.0 L "SC20M125.1Q6" I4 turbocharged (diesel)
- Electric motor: 150kW permanent magnet synchronous electric motor
- Transmission: 6-speed manual; 6-speed automatic

Dimensions
- Wheelbase: 3,000 mm (118.1 in)
- Length: 4,998–5,364 mm (196.8–211.2 in)
- Width: 2,030 mm (79.9 in)
- Height: 1,990–2,390 mm (78.3–94.1 in)
- Curb weight: 1,786–2,020 kg (3,937–4,453 lb)

The Maxus V70 is a van produced by Maxus from 2023.

== Overview ==
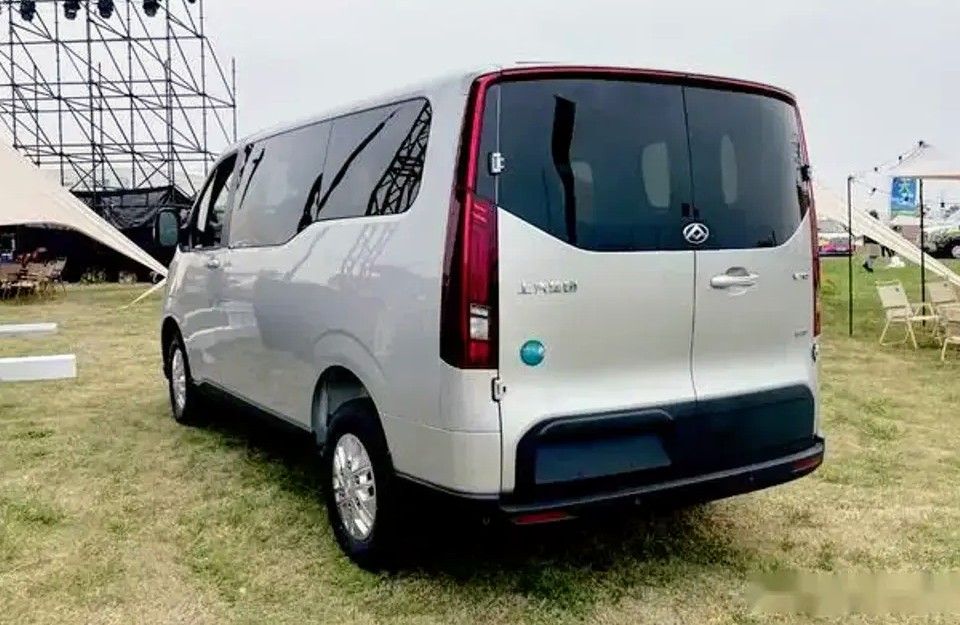
Rear view

The V70 was unveiled online November 2022 by Maxus. Positioned mainly as a light passenger vehicle, of the V70 is offered as 5/6/9-seater variants and rides on Maxus's brand new platform.

One engine is available, a 2.0-litre inline-four turbodiesel with a maximum output of 93 kW (126 PS; 125 hp) and top speed is 156 km/h (97 mph). Fuel consumption is reported to be 7.4 L/100 km (38 mpg_{‑imp}; 32 mpg_{‑US}).

== Battery electric variant ==
The battery electric variant of the vehicle is sold in China, as the Maxus EV70.

There are multiple battery size and space options: 77 or 88 kWh net capacity, both are CATL LFP. It comes as L1H1 (4,998 mm × 2,030 mm × 1,990 mm or 197 in × 80 in × 78 in), L2H1 (5,364 mm × 2,030 mm × 1,990 mm or 211 in × 80 in × 78 in) and L2H2 (5,364 mm × 2,030 mm × 2,390 mm or 211 in × 80 in × 94 in). The Onboard-Charger is capable of 11 kW AC, while via DC 90 kW is possible. Top speed 120 km/h (75 mph) in Power mode, 90 km/h (56 mph) in Eco or Normal mode.

== Iveco Fidato ==
The Iveco Fidato (聚星, Juxing) is the rebadged variant sold by SAIC-Iveco. The Iveco variant features a restyled front bumper while sharing the exact same dimensions, powertrain, and performance data as the Maxus variant.

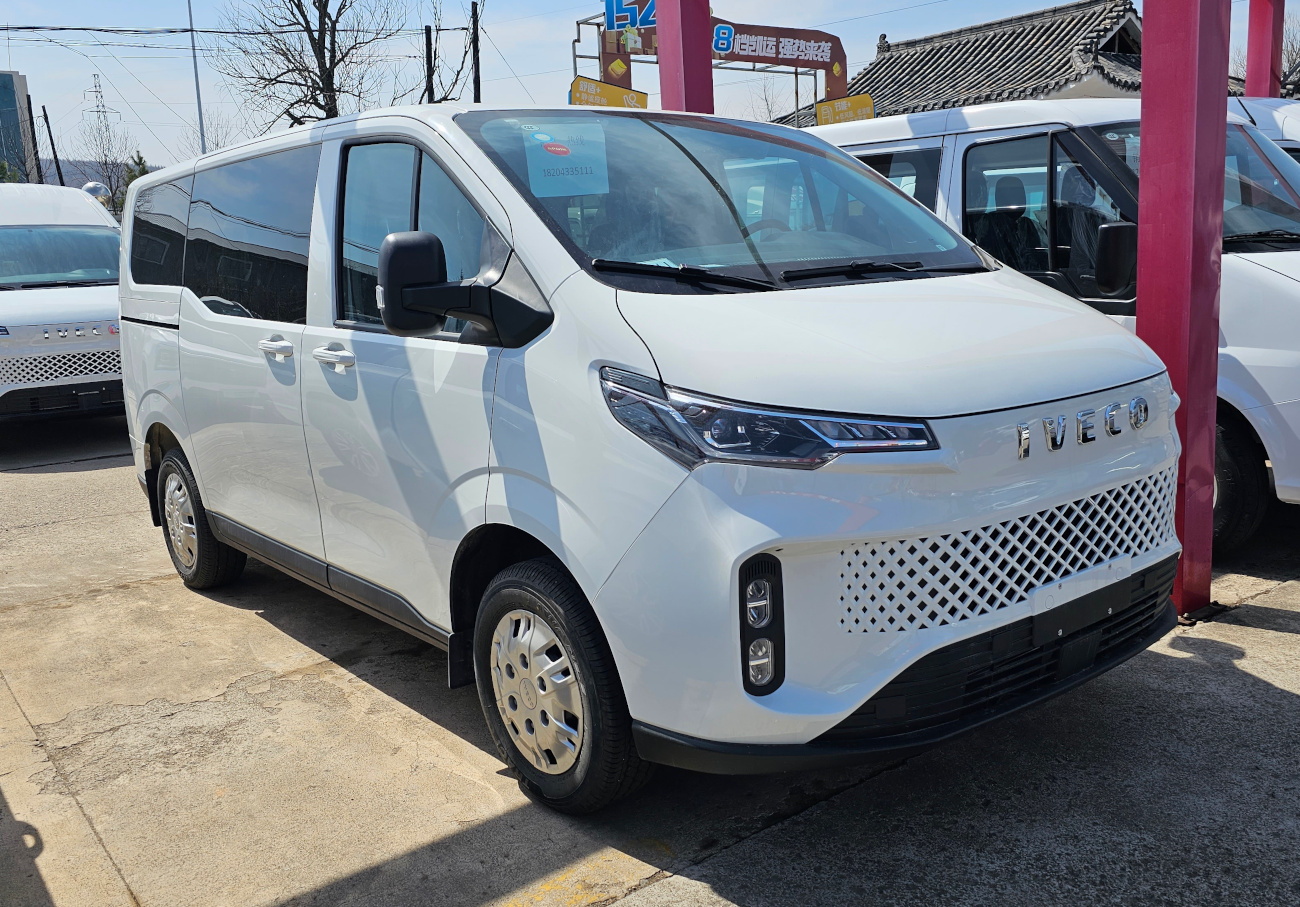
Iveco Fidato

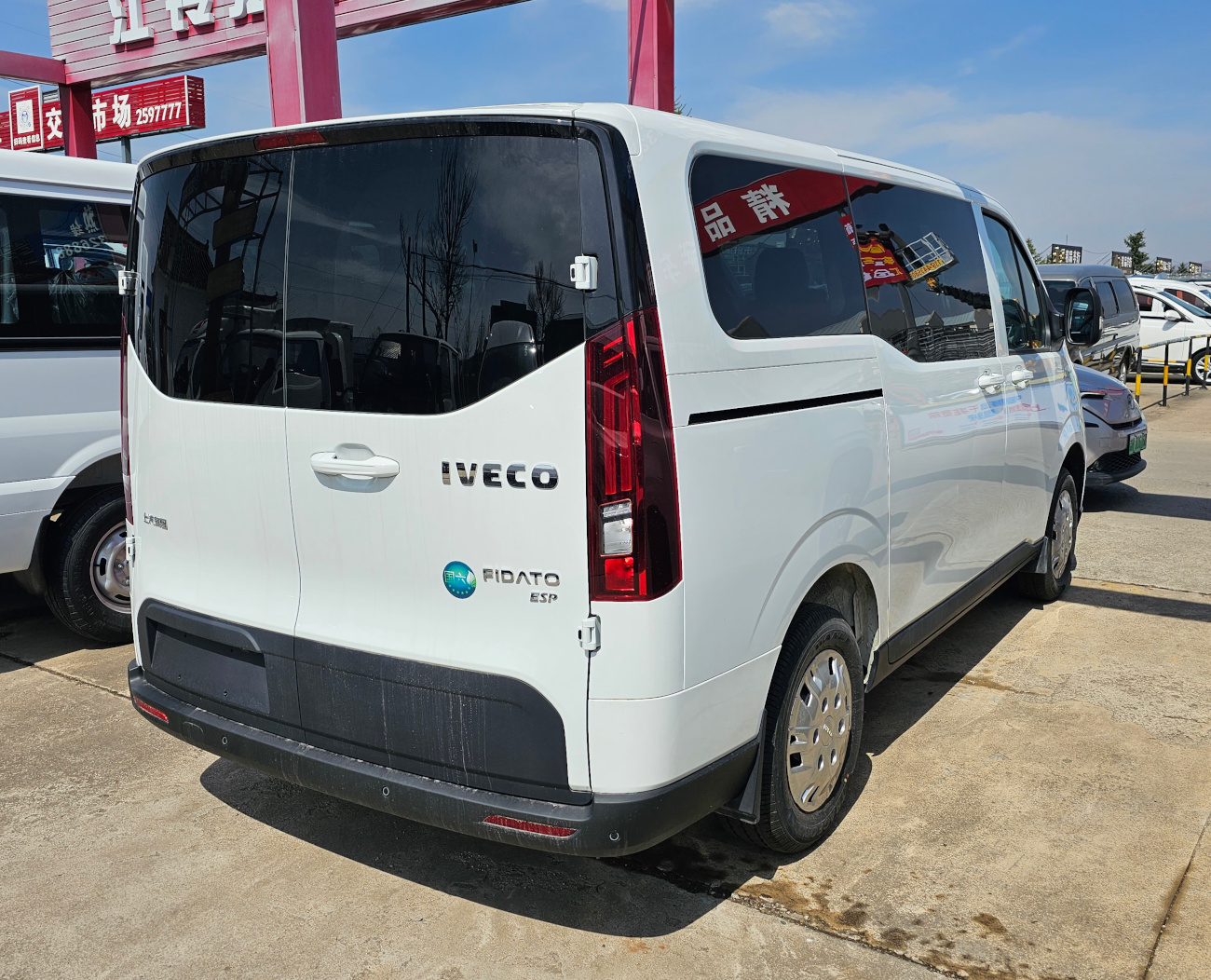
Rear view

== Chevrolet Express Max ==
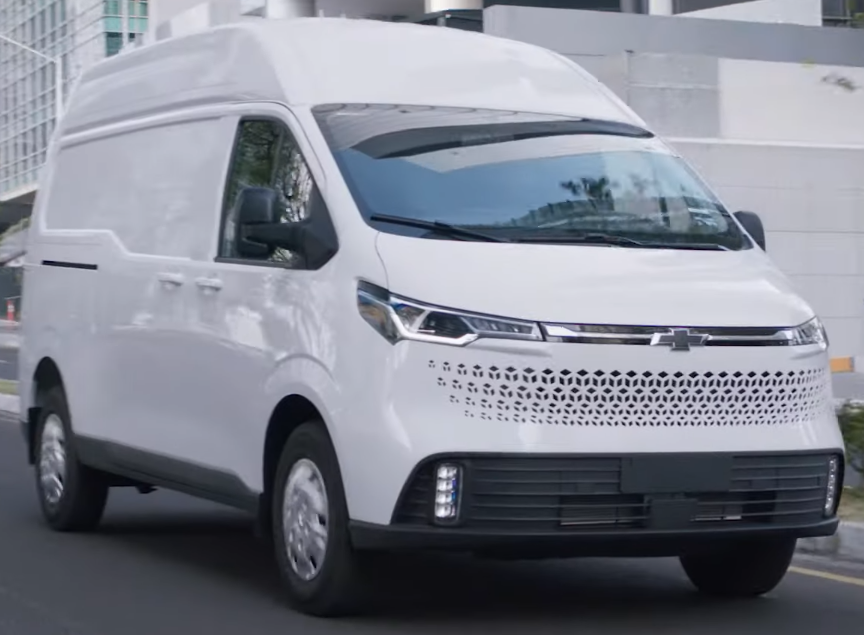
Chevrolet Express Max

The Chevrolet Express Max is a rebadged variant sold by Chevrolet in Mexico, starting in early 2025. It features the same 2.0 L diesel engine, with manual transmission and a high roof available. In December 2025, Chevrolet launched the Express Max EV in Mexico, with motor and battery options similar to the electric EV70.

== Safety ==
ANCAP test results LDV eDeliver 7 electric variants (2024)
Overall
Grading:	77% (Gold)

ANCAP test results LDV Deliver 7 diesel variants only (2025)
Overall
Grading:	86% (Platinum)

Euro NCAP test results Maxus eDeliver 7 (2025)
Test	Score
Overall:	4 /5 stars
Safe driving	61%
Crash avoidance	74%
Post crash	80%

Euro NCAP test results Maxus eDeliver 7 (reassessed) (2025)
Test	Score
Overall:	5 /5 stars
Safe driving	67%
Crash avoidance	77%
Post crash	80%
