= Toyota Granvia =

Automotive nameplate by Toyota

The Toyota Granvia (Japanese: トヨタ・グランビア, Hepburn: Toyota Guranbia) is an automobile nameplate used by the Japanese automaker Toyota since 1995 for several minivan models:

- XH10 series Toyota Granvia, a H100 series Toyota HiAce-based semi-bonneted van sold in Japan between 1995 and 2002
- H300 series Toyota HiAce, marketed as Granvia for the models sold in Taiwan, Australasia, Argentina, Southeast Asia, and the Middle East since 2019
- XL40 series Toyota Sienna, marketed as Granvia for the models produced by FAW Toyota in China since 2022
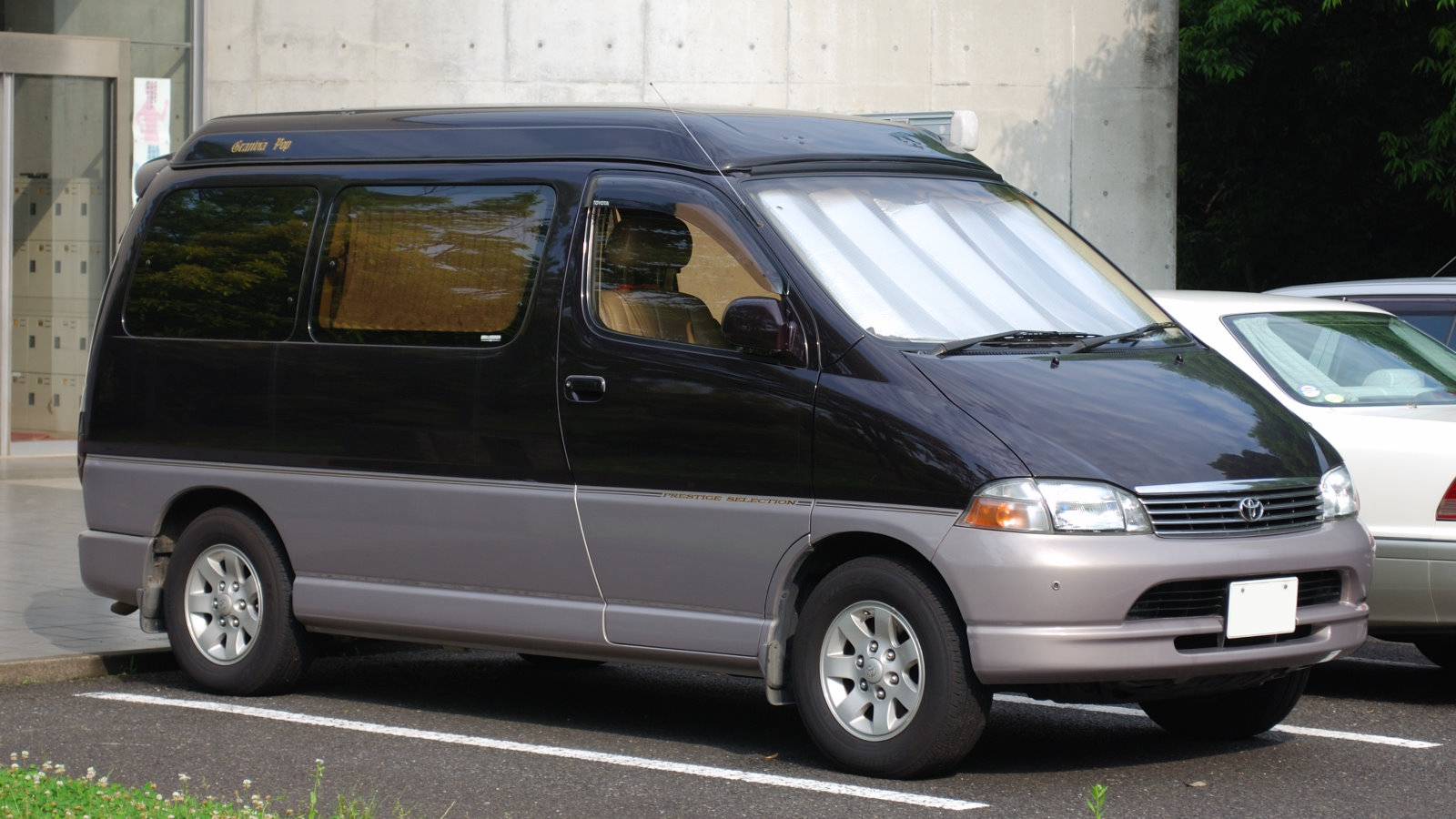
1997 Toyota Granvia (XH10)

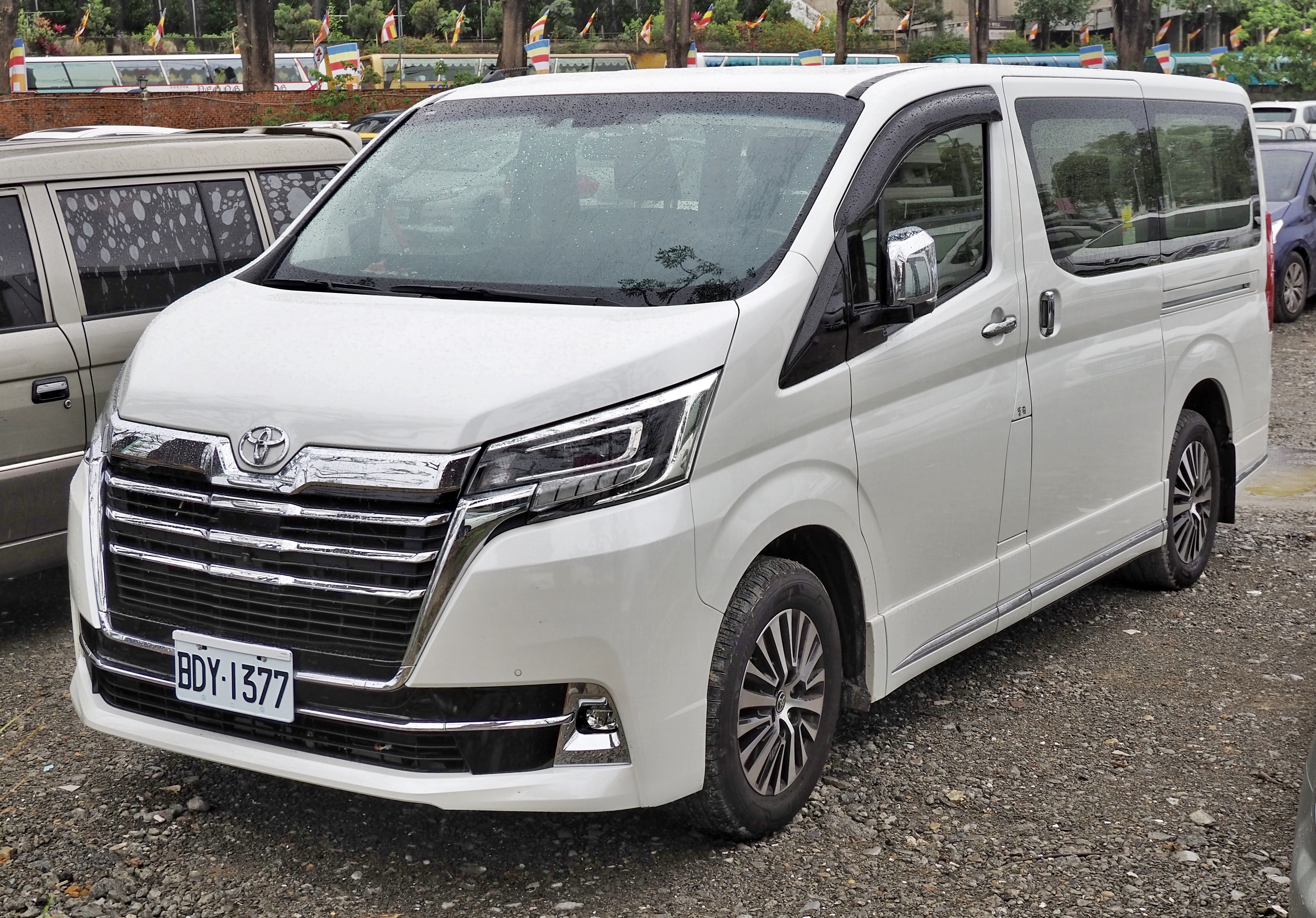
2019 Toyota Granvia (H300)

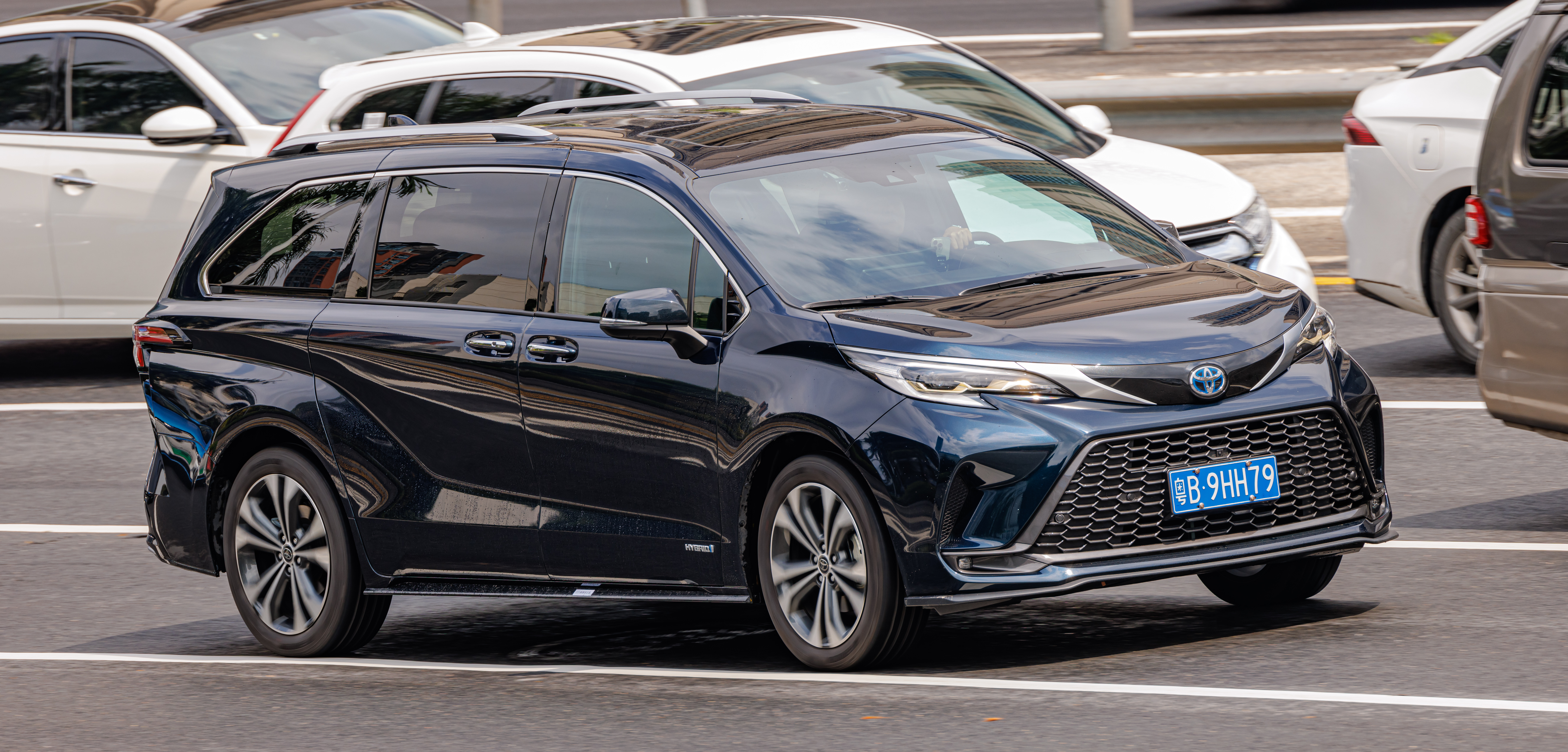
2022 Toyota Granvia (XL40)
