= Lada Kalina =

Range of supermini cars produced by Lada (2004-2018)

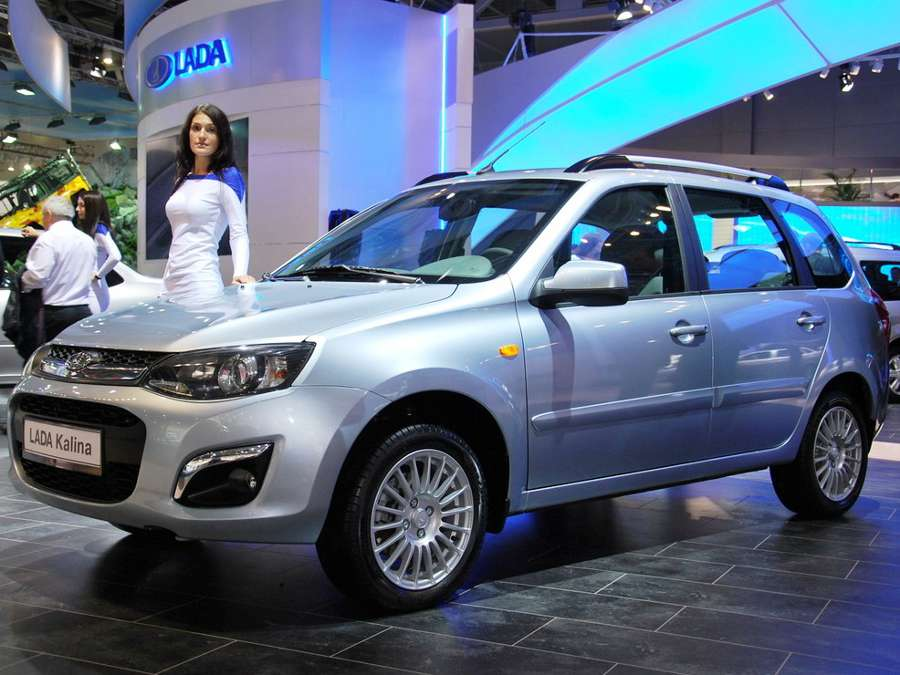
- Lada Kalina Station Wagon II

Overview
- Manufacturer: Lada
- Production: 2004–2018

Body and chassis
- Class: Supermini

Chronology
- Successor: Lada Granta

The Lada Kalina (Russian: Ла́да Кали́на) is a supermini car produced by the Russian manufacturer Lada (AvtoVAZ) from 18 November 2004 to July 2018. The name Kalina comes from the Russian name for a type of viburnum. It is also marketed as the Lada 117/119 in Finland.

The works on Lada Kalina started in 1993. In 1998 the projected vehicle was named "Lada-Kalina". Prototypes were presented in 1999 (hatchback), 2000 (sedan) and 2001 (combi).

== First generation ==
First generation
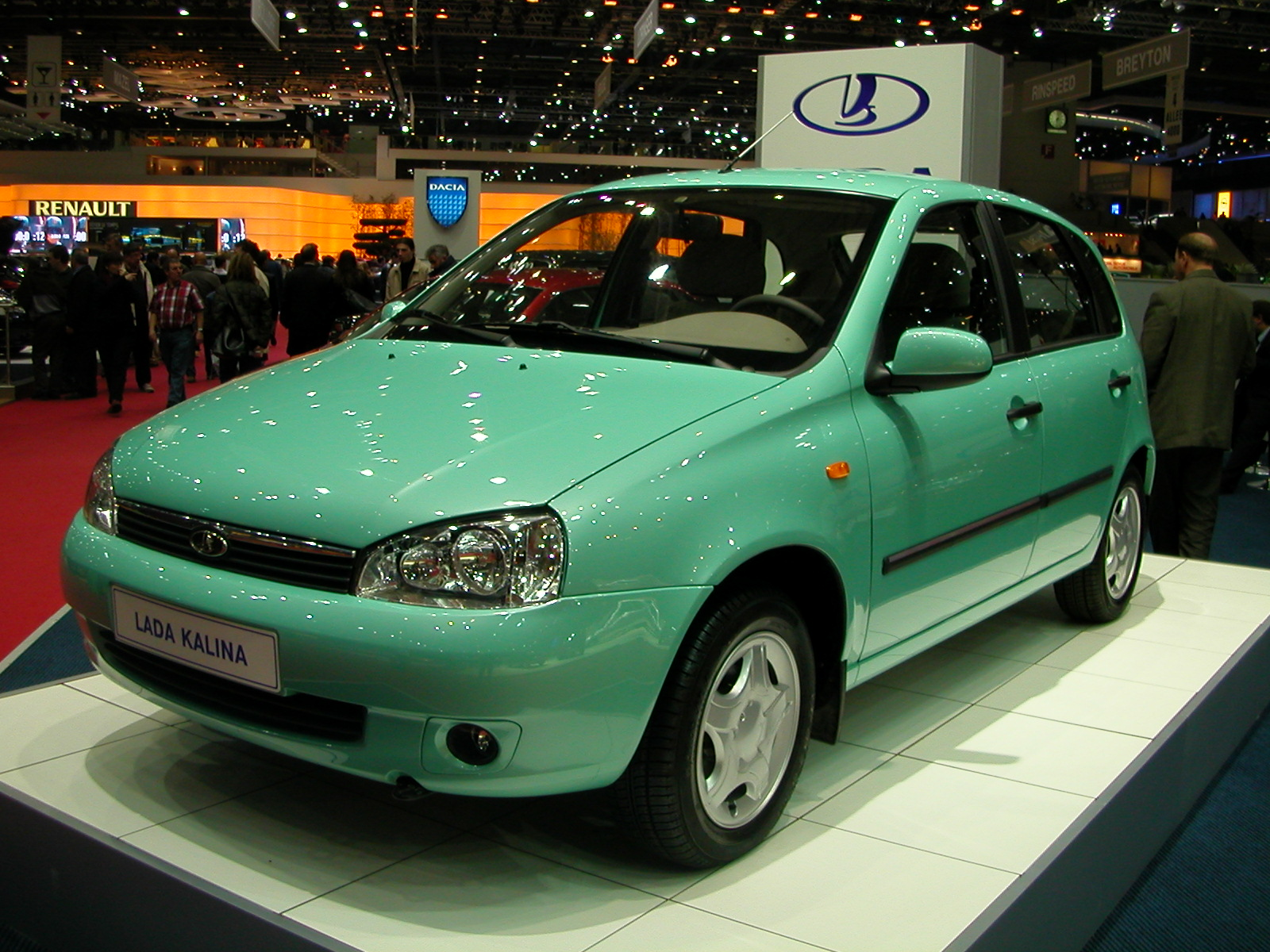

Overview
- Manufacturer: Lada
- Also called: Lada 117 (Finland, wagon); Lada 119 (Finland, hatchback); Lada 1117 (wagon); Lada 1118 (sedan); Lada 1119 (hatchback); Lada Kalina
- Production: November 2004 – May 2013
- Assembly: Russia: Tolyatti (AvtoVAZ & Lada Sport); Romania: Bucharest (Dunarea)

Body and chassis
- Body style: 5-door hatchback 5-door station wagon 4-door saloon
- Layout: Front-engine, front-wheel-drive

Powertrain
- Engine: 1.4 L I4; 1.6 L I4; 1.6 L 16-valve I4; 1.9 L F8Q TD I4; 1.9 L F9Q DI-D I4

Dimensions
- Wheelbase: 2,470 mm (97.2 in)
- Length: 3,850 mm (151.6 in) (hatchback); 4,050 mm (159.4 in) (saloon & estate)
- Width: 1,670 mm (65.7 in)
- Height: 1,500 mm (59.1 in)
- Curb weight: 1,080 kg (2,381 lb)

Production of the Kalina began with a four-door sedan in 2005, a five-door hatchback being released in 2006 and a station wagon released in 2007. The hot-dip galvanized steel with enhanced corrosion resistance used in the production of this car was specially developed by a number of Russian steel producers.

The first generation Kalina scored 5.6 points out of 16 in a frontal crash test conducted by the Russian ARCAP safety assessment program in 2005, and was awarded one star out of four.

The Kalina was exported to most Western European markets with a price of about €7,000–8,000. It offers driver and passenger airbags, ABS, electric power steering, air conditioning and rear seats that can be folded so that a horizontal platform is formed.

There were three inline-four gasoline engine options, ranging from 81 to 98 hp (60 to 72 kW): a 1.4-litre 16-valve (91 hp; 67 kW), a 1.6-litre 8-valve (81 hp; 60 kW) and a 1.6-litre 16-valve (98 hp; 72 kW).

Its trade name is Kalina in most countries, but in Finland, where kalina means rattle or clatter, the car is marketed as the Lada 119. Its main competitors were low priced cars like the Dacia Logan and Hyundai Accent.

A sportier version, the Kalina GS Sport, is also produced. The Super 1600 concept car, used a turbocharged 1.6 petrol engine derived from the naturally aspirated standard model.

A Lada Kalina was used as the "Reasonably-Priced Car" in the Top Gear Russia television series. It was the fourth most popular car in Russia in 2009, debuting with 60,746 sales nationally, and ranked first in 2012.

=== Lada El Lada ===
The electric car Lada El Lada was introduced in 2011. This was a Lada Kalina station wagon with the 30 kW electric motor powered by the 23 kWh battery pack. Only 100 electric Ladas were produced.

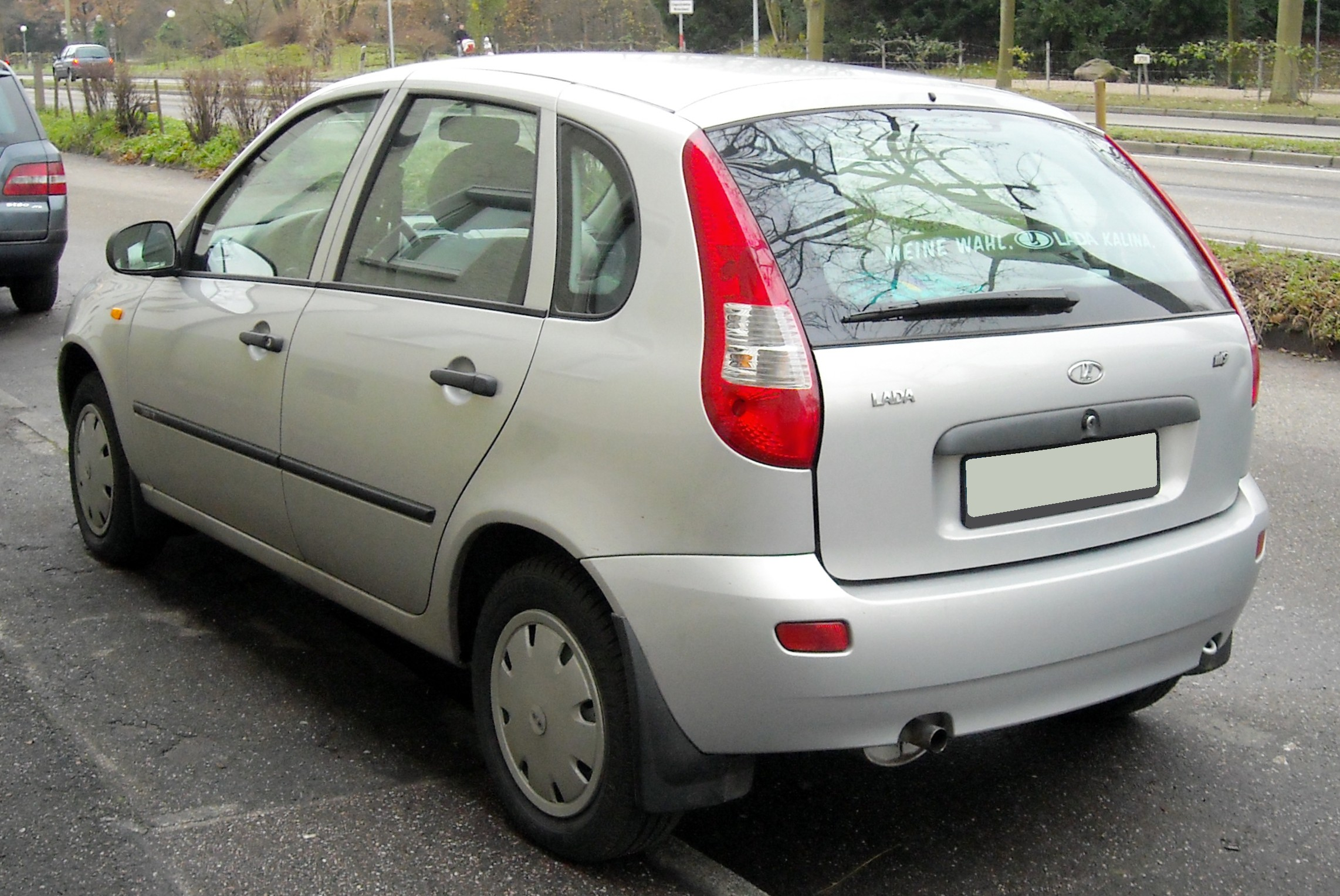
Lada Kalina hatchback (2006–2013)

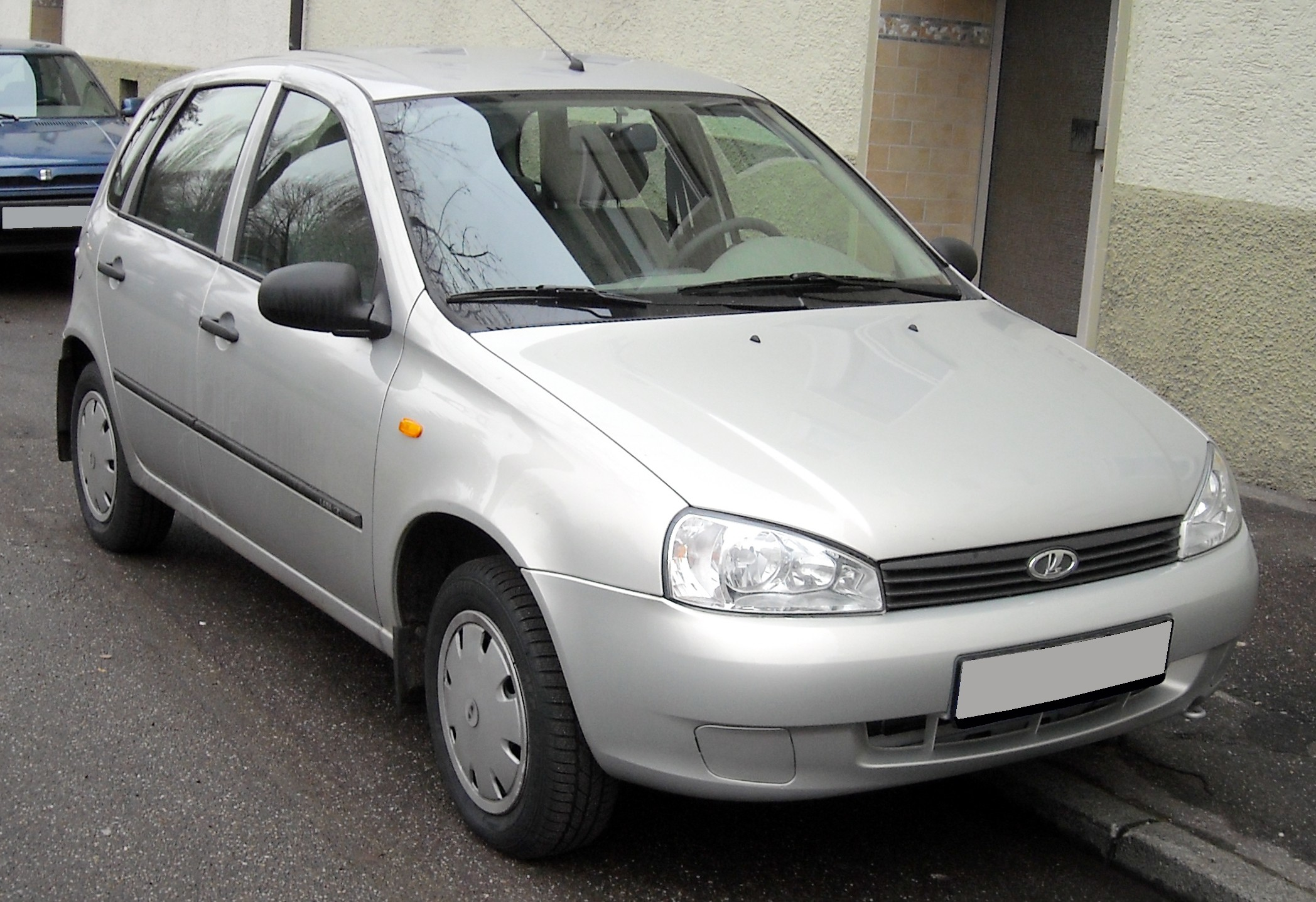
Lada Kalina hatchback (2006–2013)

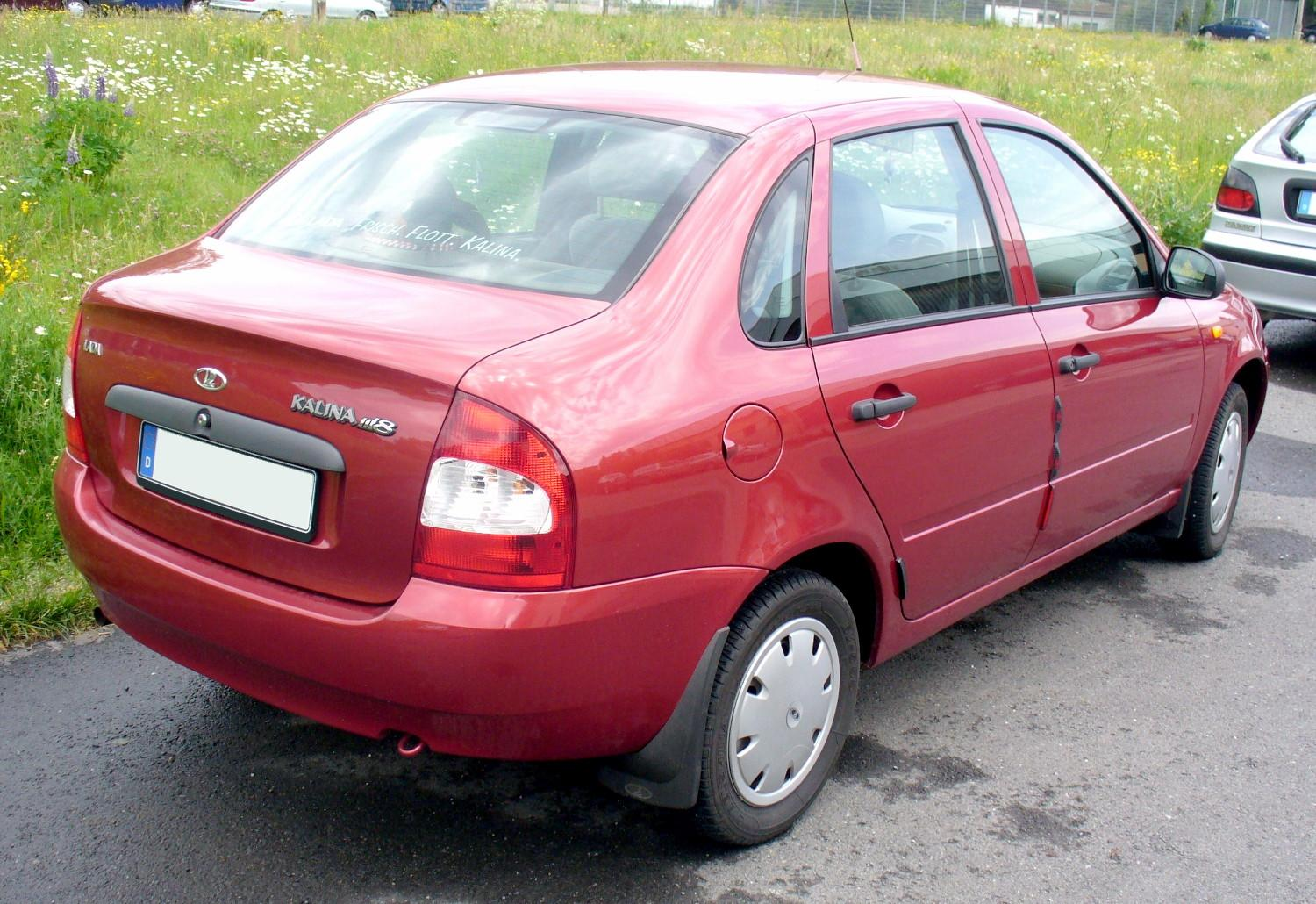
Lada Kalina saloon (2005–2009)

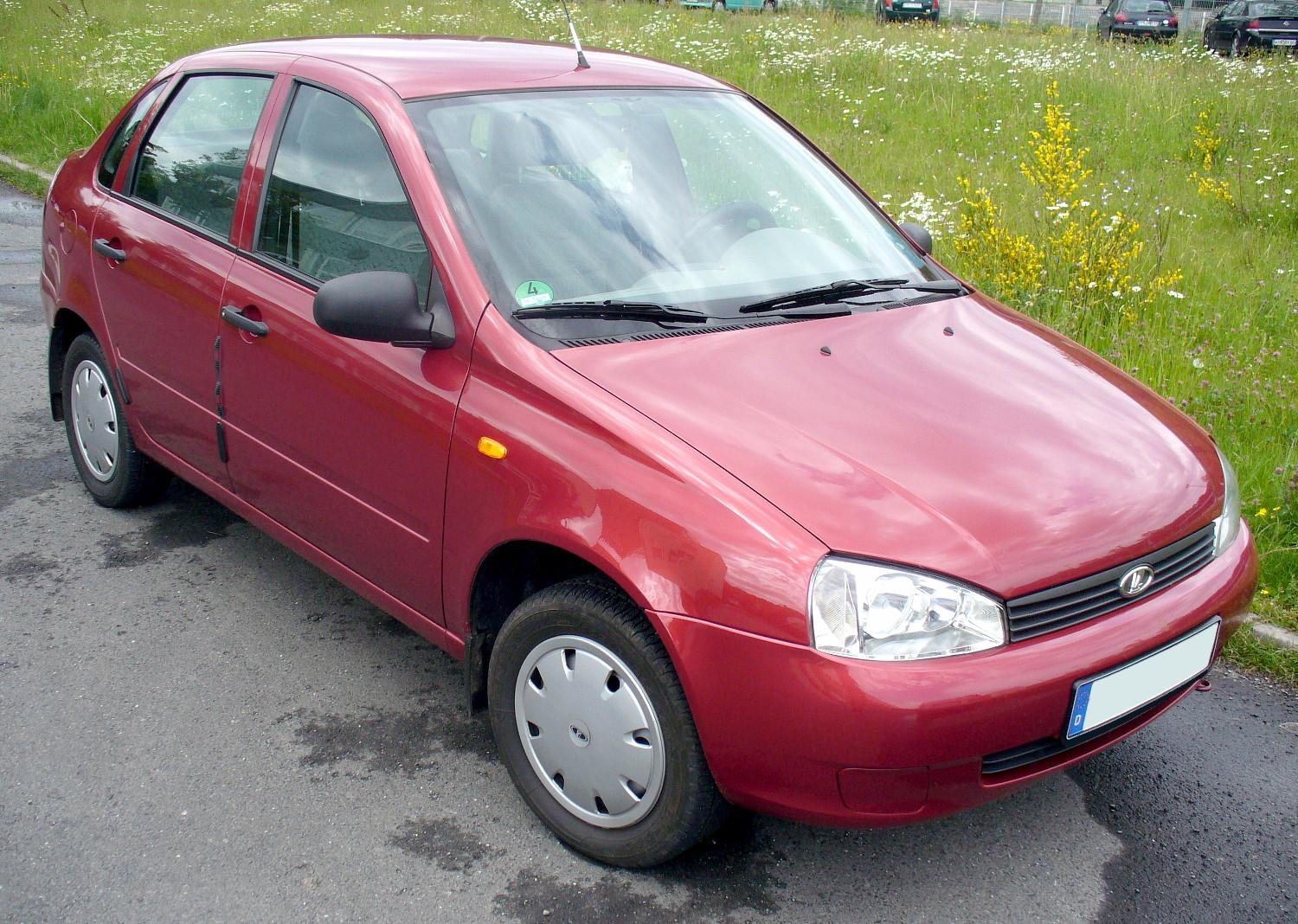
Lada Kalina saloon (2005–2009)

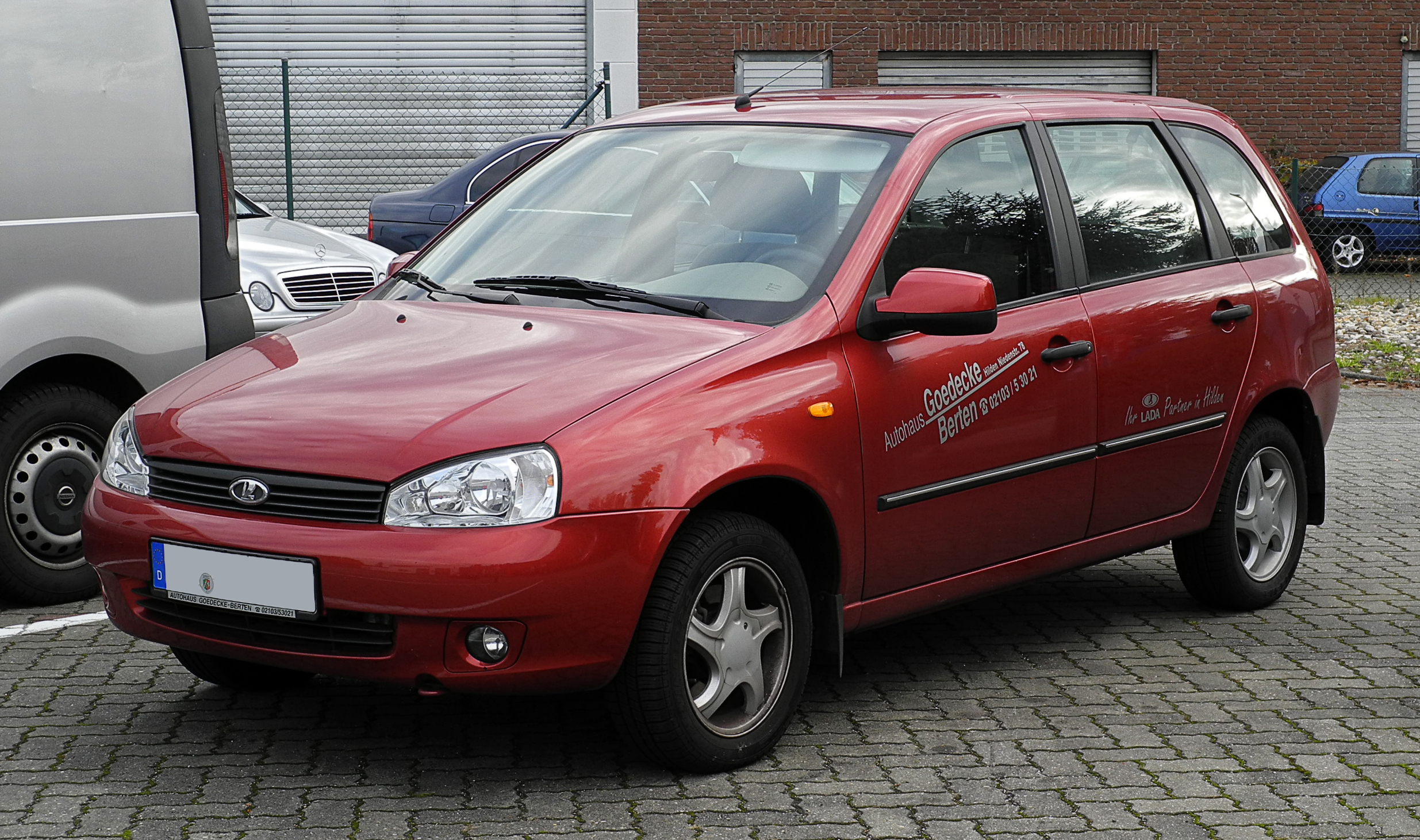
Lada Kalina Station Wagon (2007–2013)

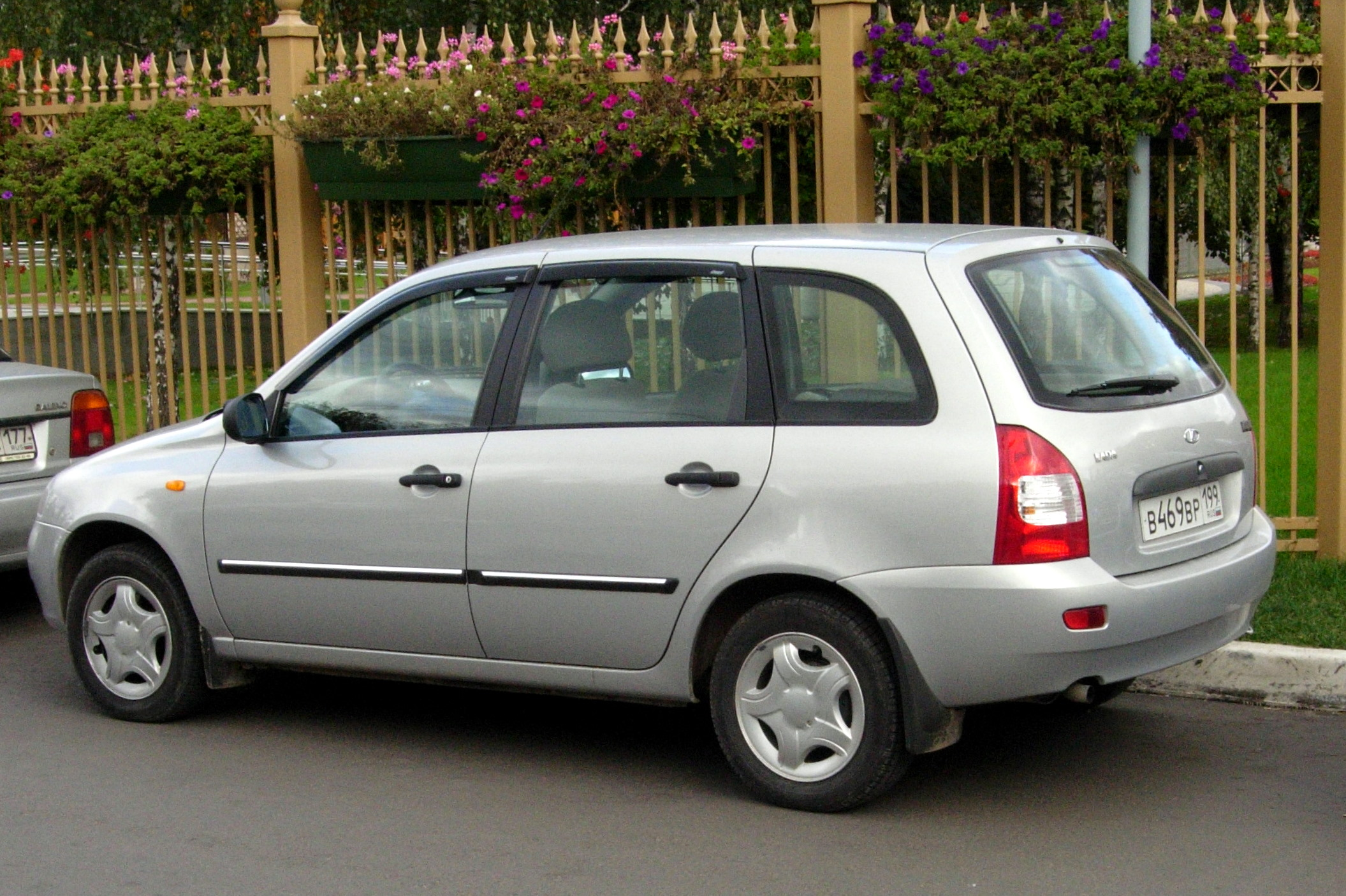
Lada Kalina Station Wagon (2007–2013)

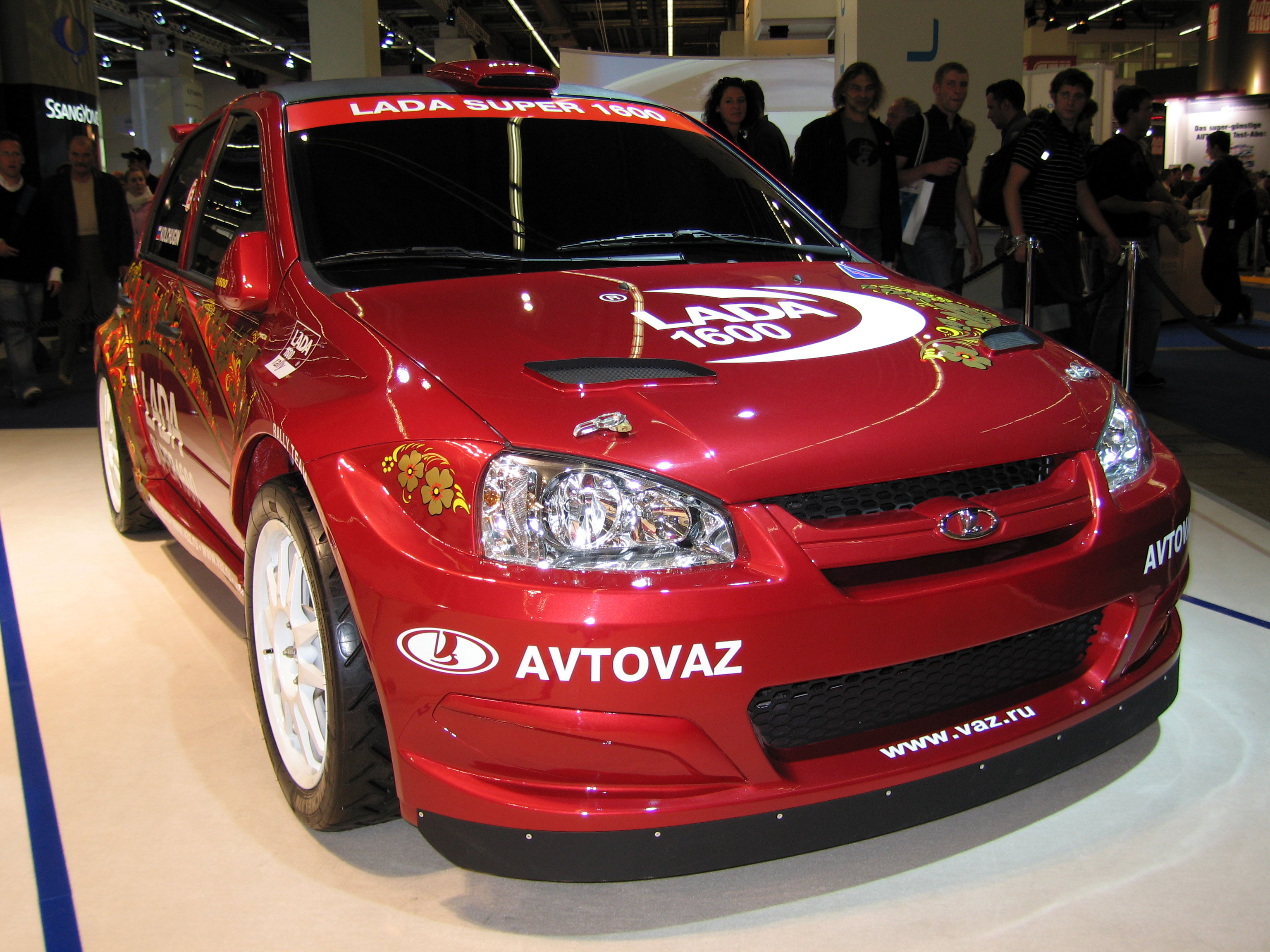
Lada Kalina Super 1600

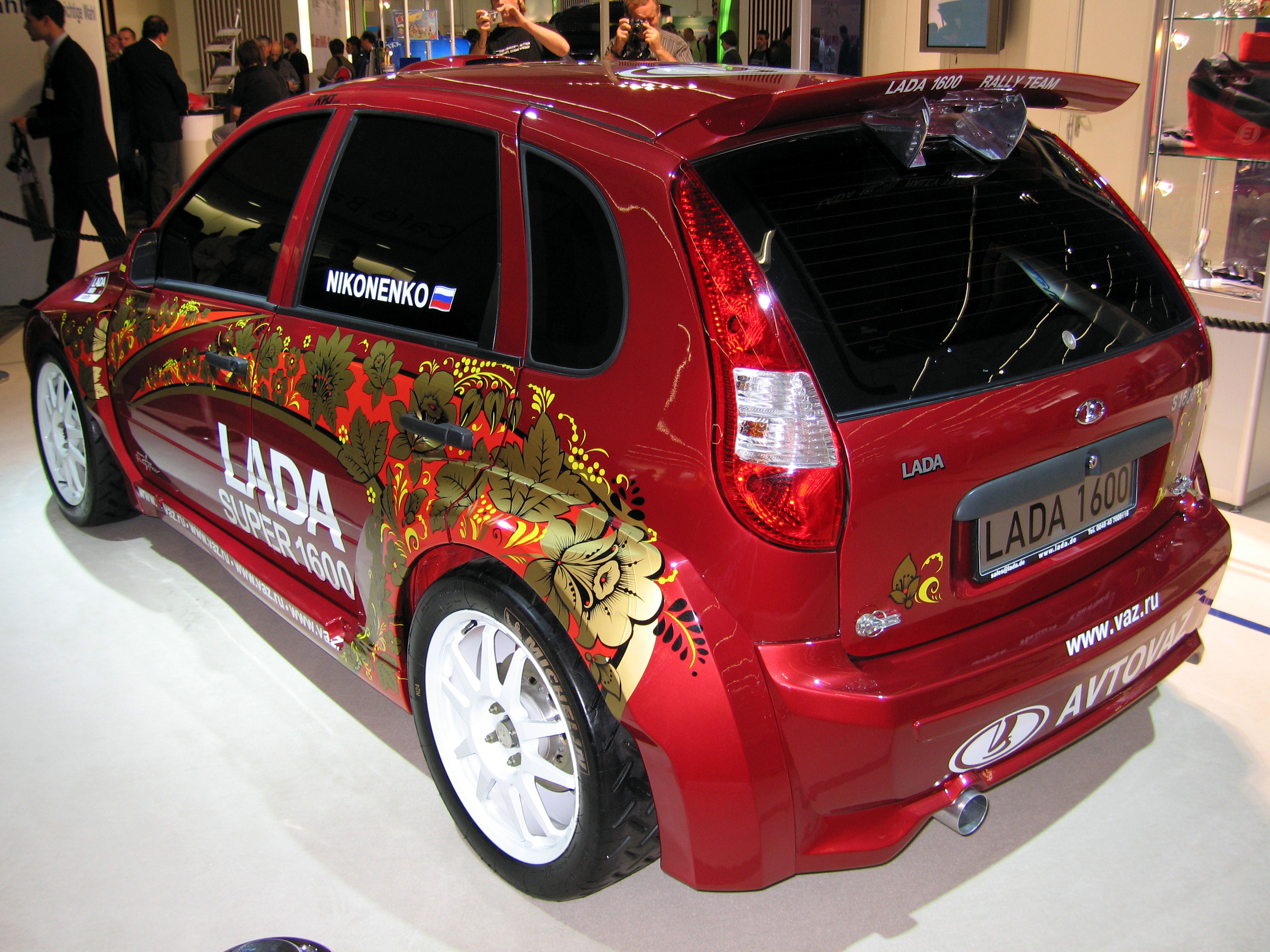
Lada Kalina Super 1600

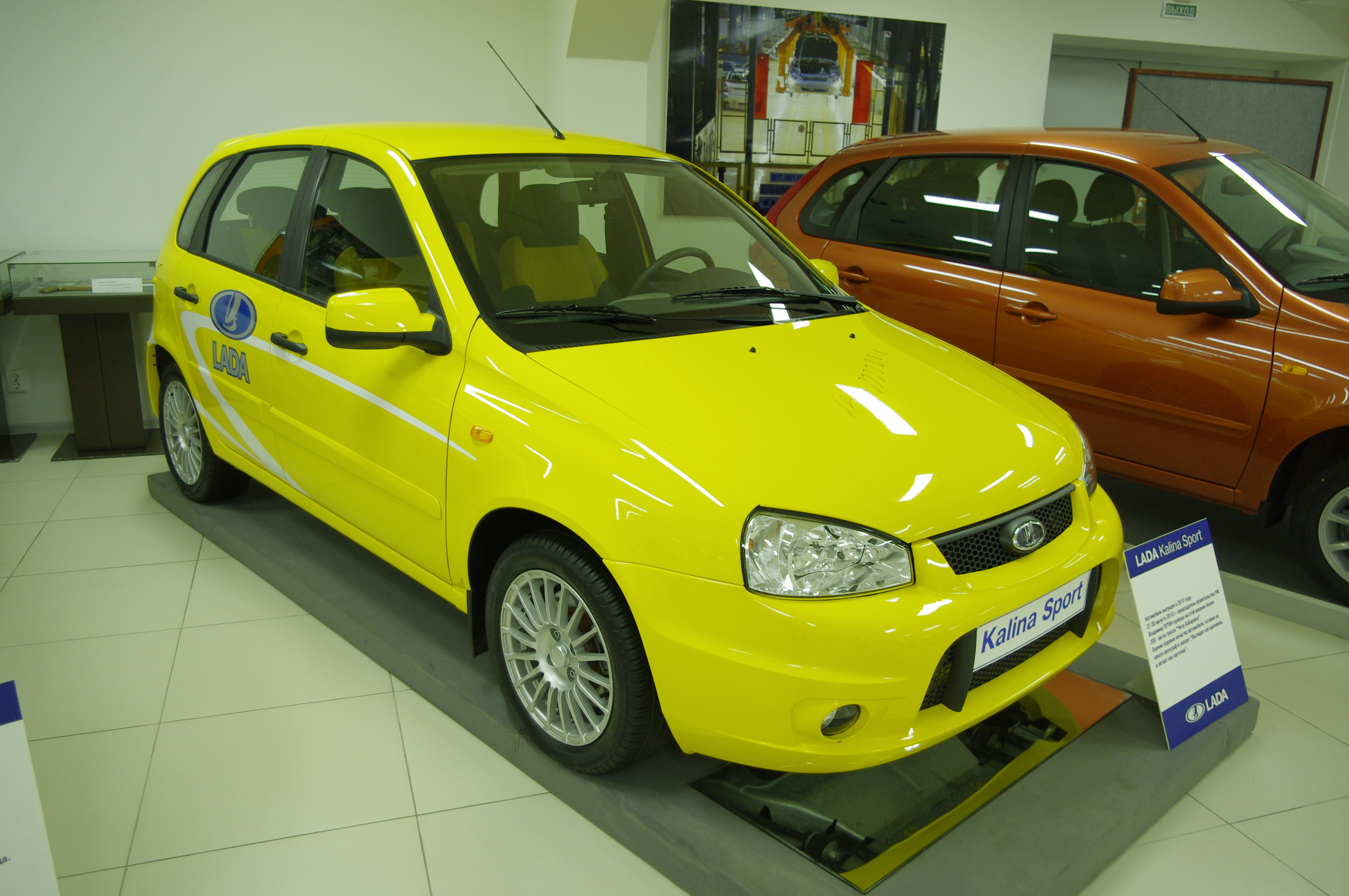
Lada Kalina Sport (2008–2013)

== Second generation ==
Second generation
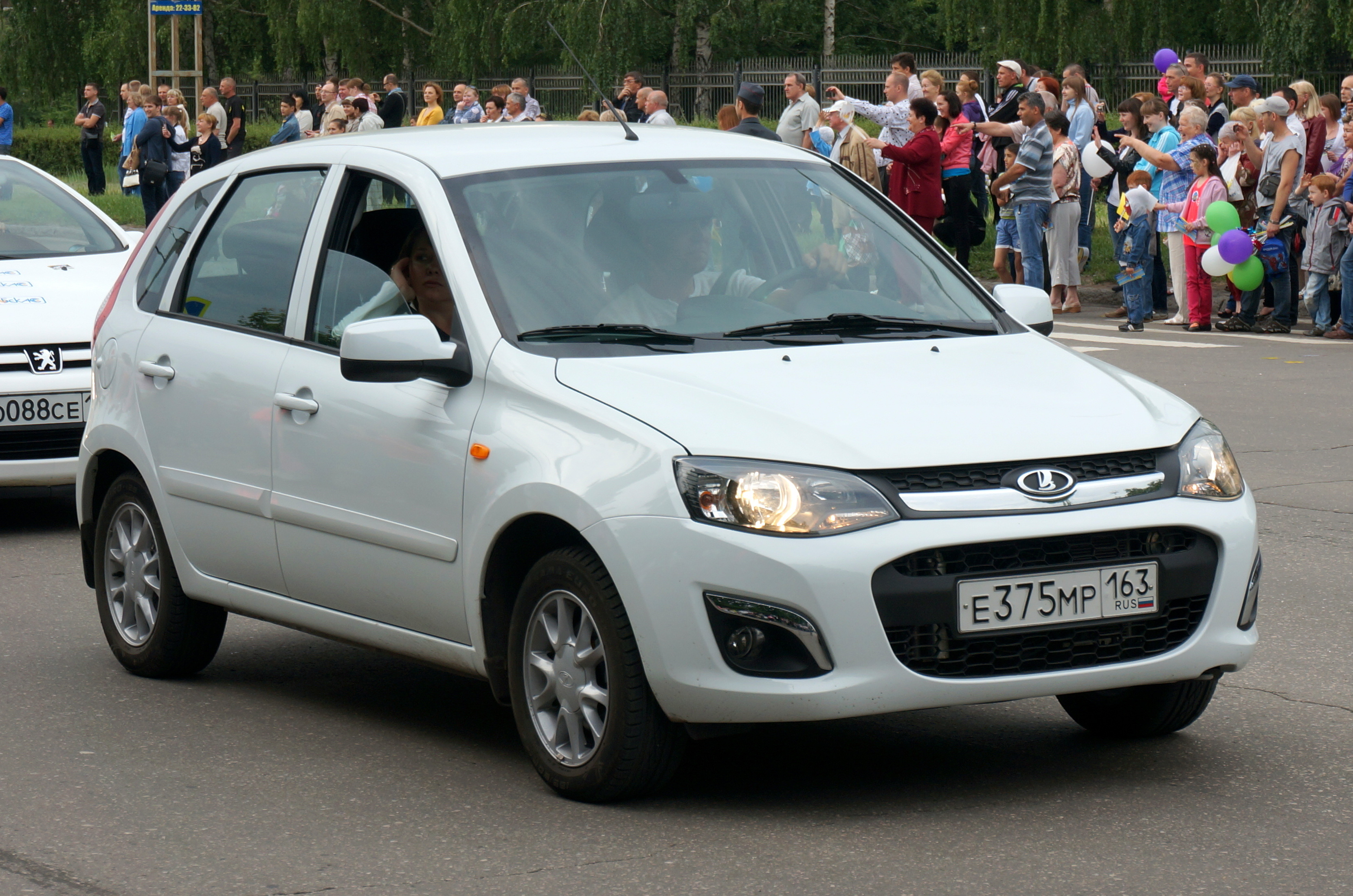

Overview
- Manufacturer: Lada
- Also called: Lada 2192 (hatchback); Lada 2194 (wagon)
- Production: May 2013 – July 2018
- Assembly: Russia: Tolyatti (AvtoVAZ & Lada Sport); Kazakhstan: Ust-Kamenogorsk (Asia-Avto)

Body and chassis
- Body style: 5-door hatchback 5-door estate
- Layout: Front-engine, front-wheel-drive
- Related: Lada Granta; Datsun mi-Do

Powertrain
- Engine: 1.6 L I4; 1.9 L F9Q DI-D I4

Dimensions
- Wheelbase: 2,476 mm (97.5 in)
- Length: 3,893 mm (153.3 in) (hatchback); 4,084 mm (160.8 in) (wagon)
- Width: 1,670 mm (65.7 in)
- Height: 1,500 mm (59.1 in)–1,560 mm (61.4 in)
- Curb weight: cross & wagon: 1,125–1,160 kg (2,480–2,557 lb)

The second generation of the Kalina was revealed at the 2012 Moscow International Automobile Salon. It is basically a facelifted first generation, albeit with a slightly extended wheelbase and length, 13- or 14-inch wheel discs, electronic throttle control and now produced only in hatchback and wagon form. All interior controls are now in English only, just like in the recently introduced Lux models of the Lada Granta. The Kalina was used as the basis for the Japanese Datsun mi-DO, which was produced specifically for the Russian market.

It is powered by a range of two 1.6-litre petrol engines, with 8 and 16-valve respectively, developing 86 to 105 horsepower (64 to 78 kilowatts) and 140 to 145 N⋅m (14 to 15 m⋅kgf) of torque.

The hatchback entered production in May 2013, followed by the station wagon later in September. A sport version was also available in the Russian market.

Lada Kalina Cross wagon debuted in 2014. The car differs with increased 20 mm road clearance, the altered gear ratios in transmission and the plastic body kit.

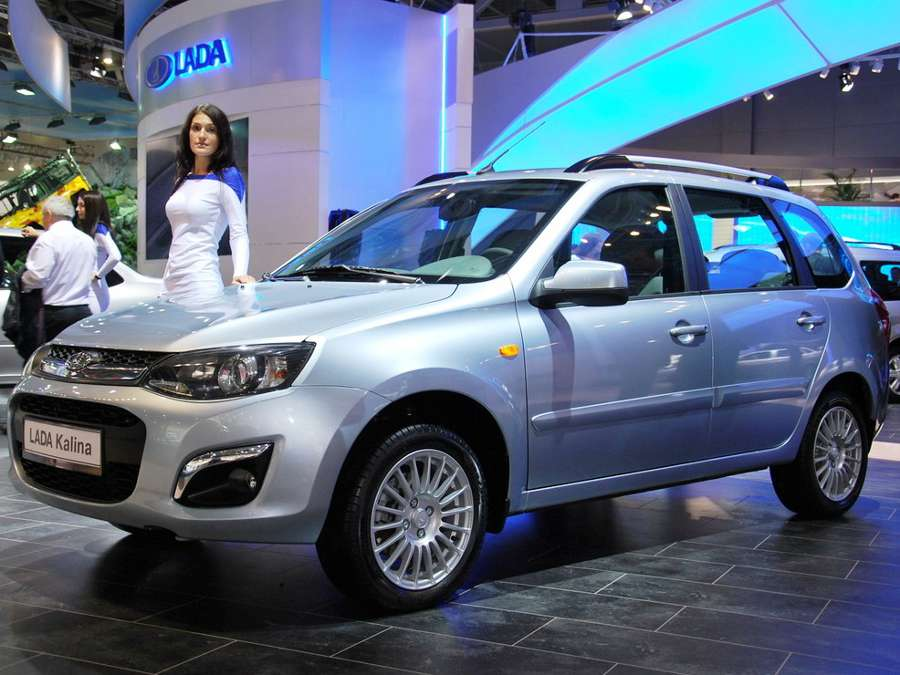
Lada Kalina II Station Wagon

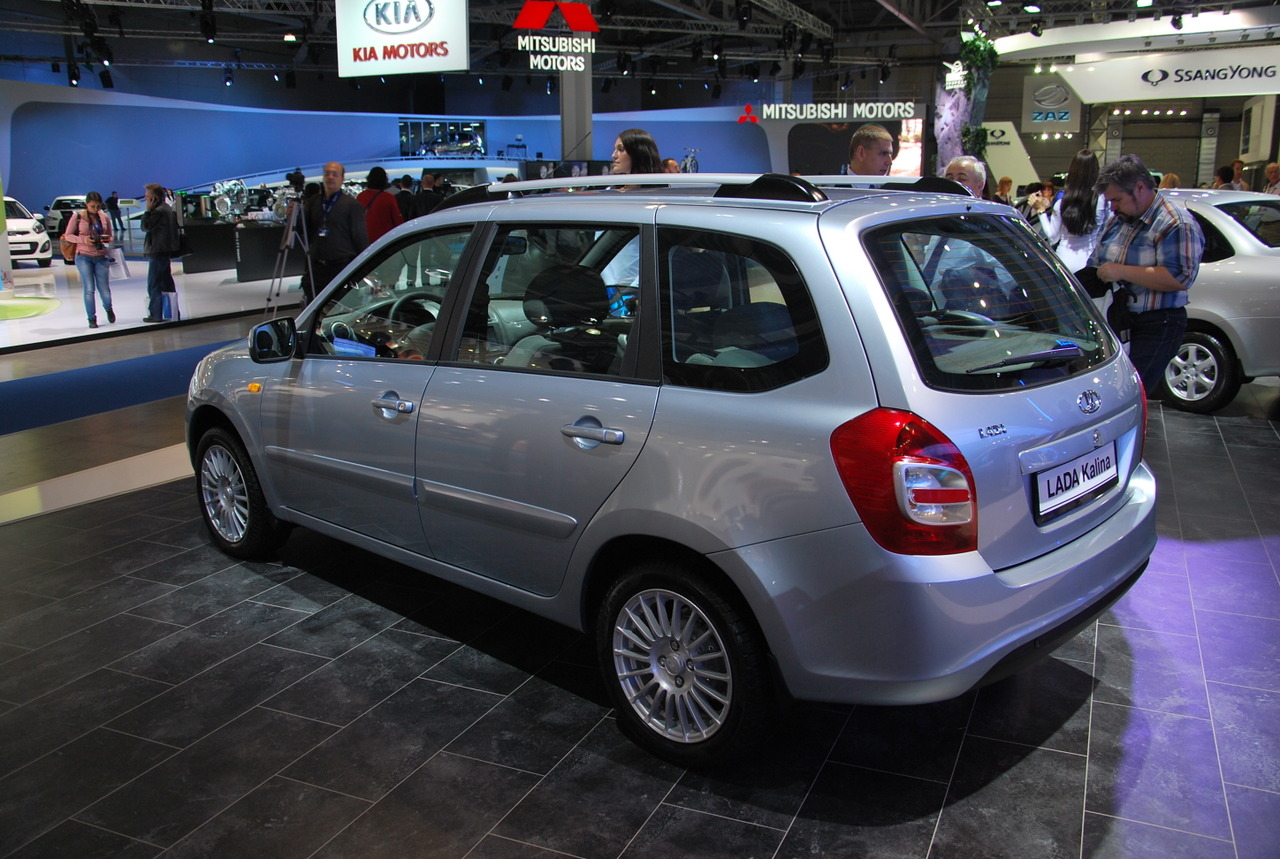
Lada Kalina II Station Wagon

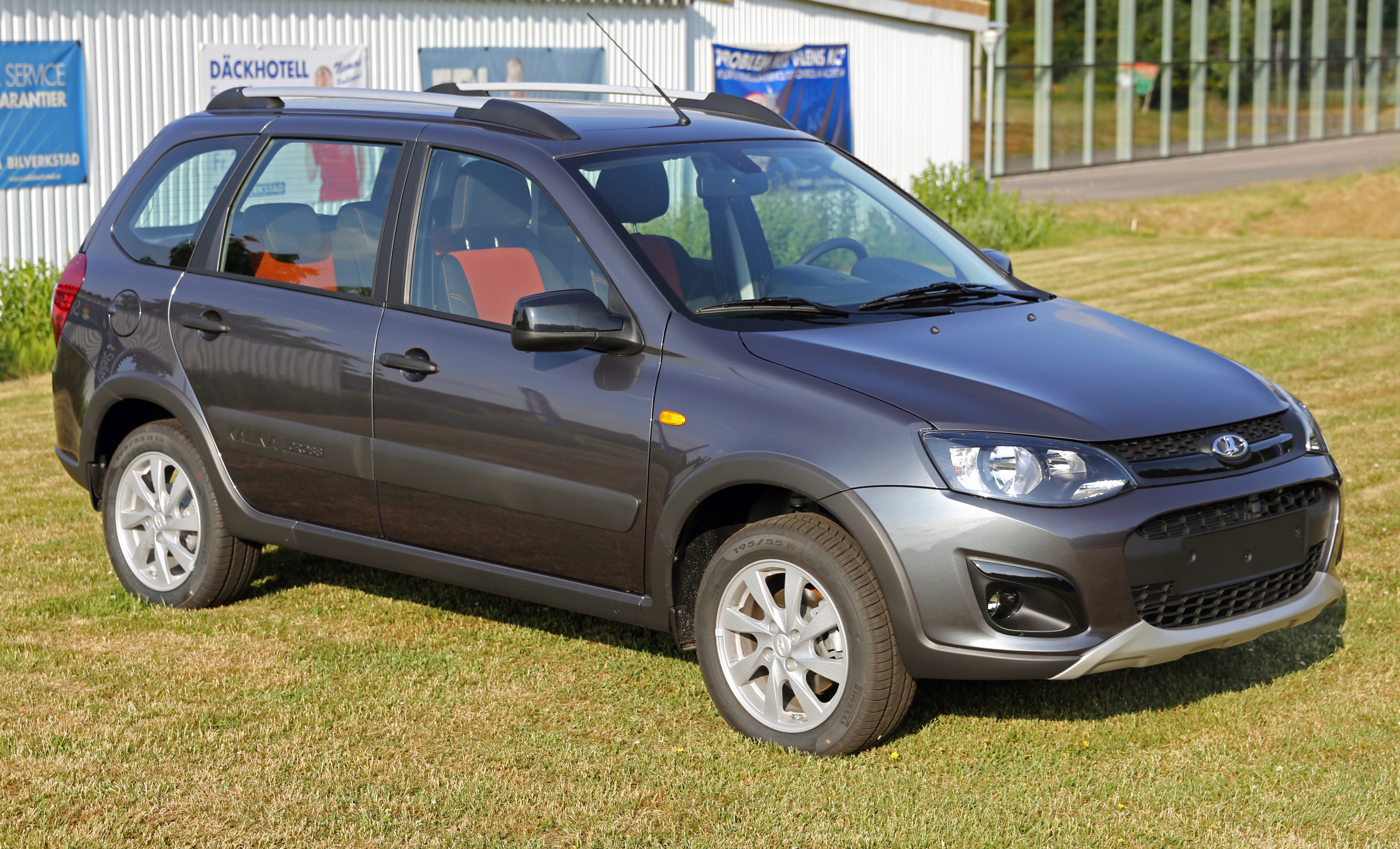
Lada Kalina Cross

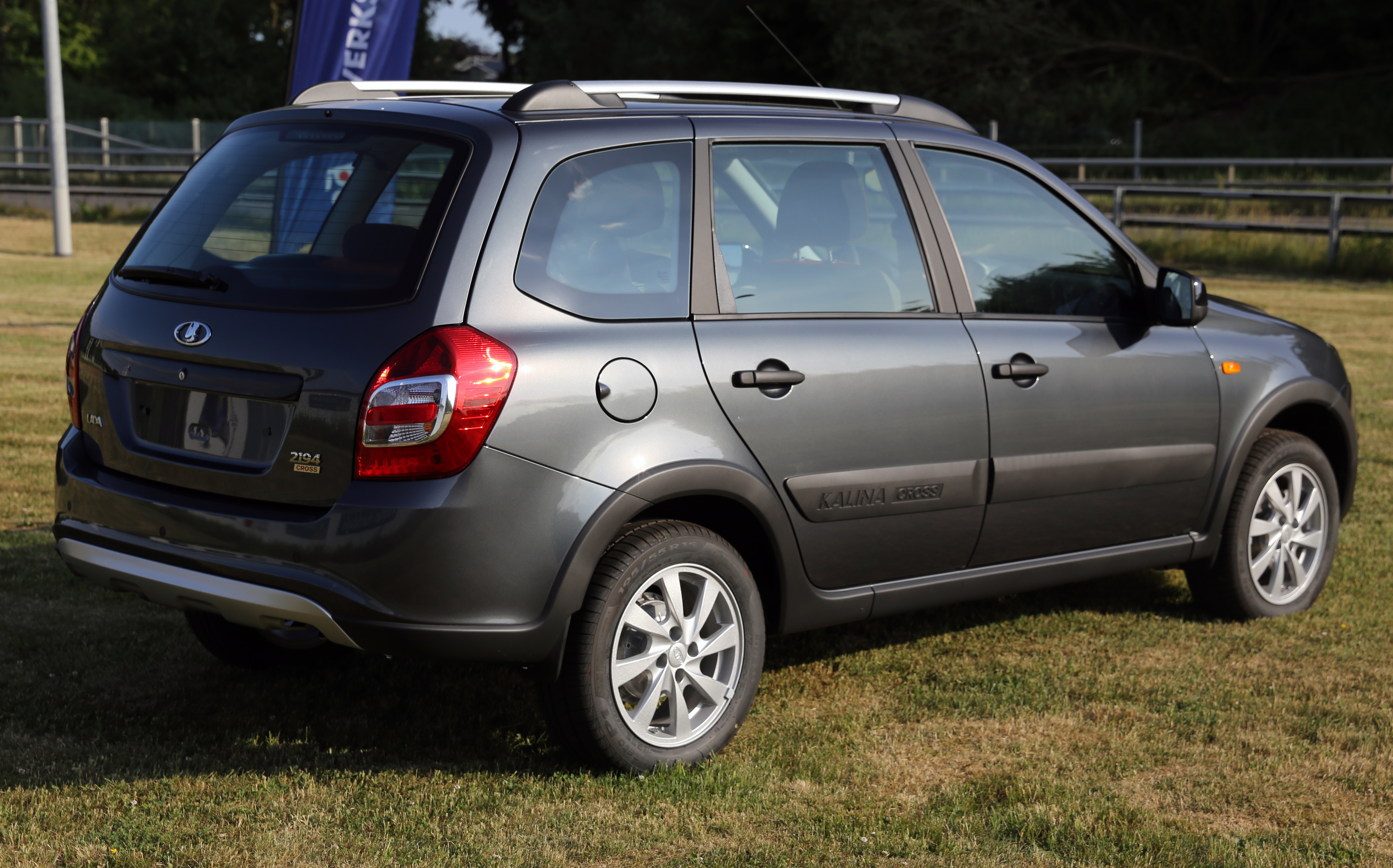
Lada Kalina Cross

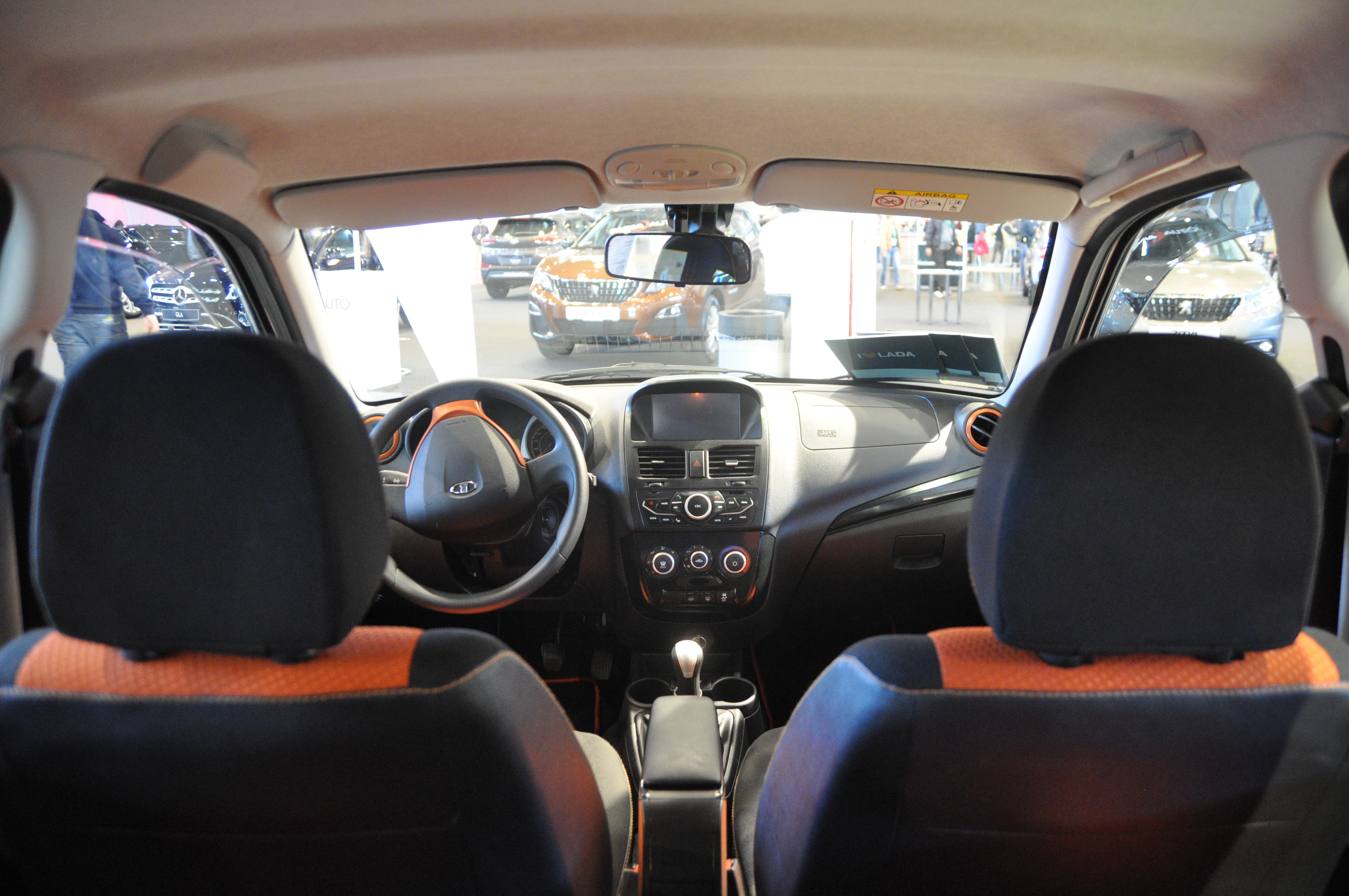
Lada Kalina interior

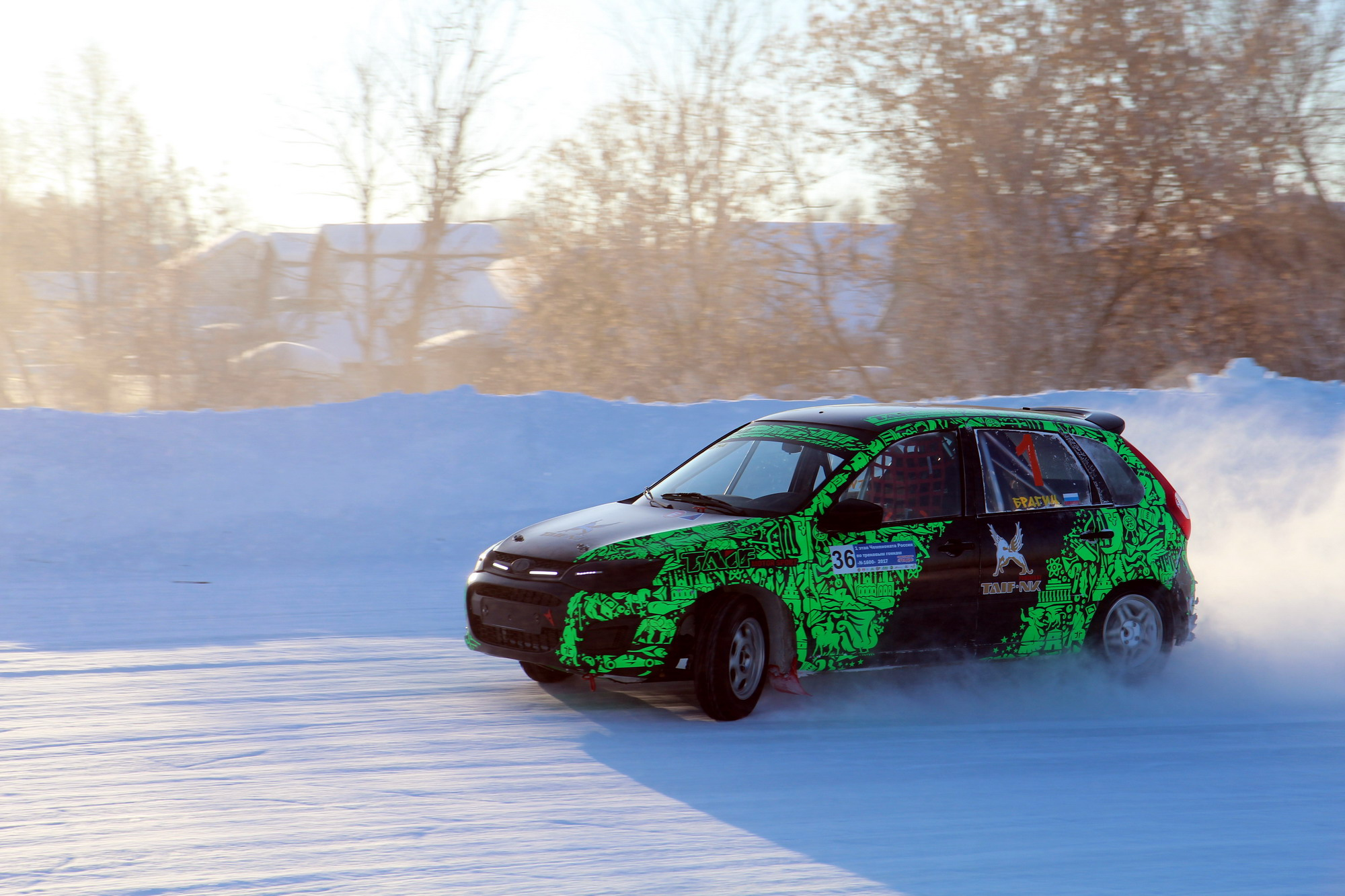
Lada Kalina NFR
