= Datsun =

Nissan's budget automobile marque; formerly Nissan's export market marque

- 2013 logo
- Industry: Automotive
- Founded: Original: 1931; 95 years ago; Relaunch: 2013; 13 years ago
- Defunct: Original: 1986; 40 years ago; Relaunch: 2022; 4 years ago
- Fate: Discontinued
- Headquarters: Tokyo, Japan
- Area served: Worldwide (1931–1986); India (2014–2022); Indonesia (2014–2020); Russia (2014–2020); South Africa (2014–2022)
- Key people: Yoshisuke Aikawa (Nissan founder); Katsuji Kawamata (Nissan president); Yutaka Katayama (Nissan USA president); José Román, CEO of new Datsun brand
- Products: Automobiles, light trucks
- Parent: Nissan
- Website: datsun.com

Datsun (UK: /ˈdætsən/, US: /ˈdɑːtsən/) was a Japanese automobile manufacturer brand owned by Nissan. Datsun's original production run began in 1931. From 1958 to 1986, only vehicles exported by Nissan were identified as Datsun. Nissan phased out the Datsun brand in March 1986, but relaunched it in June 2013 as the brand for low-cost vehicles manufactured for emerging markets. Nissan considered phasing out the Datsun brand for a second time in 2019 and 2020, eventually discontinuing the struggling brand in April 2022.

In 1931, DAT Motorcar Co. chose to name its new small car "Datson", a name which indicated the new car's smaller size when compared to the DAT's larger vehicle already in production. When Nissan took control of DAT in 1934, the name "Datson" was changed to "Datsun", because "son" also means "loss" (損) in Japanese, and to honour the sun depicted in the national flag – thus the name Datsun: Dattosan (ダットサン, Dattosan). The Datsun name is internationally well known for the 510, Fairlady roadsters, and the Z and ZX coupés.

== History ==
=== Origin of Datsun ===
Before the Datsun brand name came into being, an automobile named the DAT car was built in 1914, by the Kaishinsha Motorcar Works (快進自動車工場, Kaishin Jidōsha Kōjō), in the Azabu-Hiroo District in Tokyo. The new car's name was an acronym of the initials of the company partners:

- Kenjiro Den (Den Kenjirō)
- Rokuro Aoyama (Aoyama Rokurō)
- Meitaro Takeuchi Takeuchi Meitarō

Incidentally, datto (how a native Japanese speaker would pronounce "dat") means to "dash off like a startled rabbit" (脱兎), which was considered a good name for the little car. The firm was renamed Kaishinsha Motorcar Co. in 1918, seven years after their establishment and again, in 1925, to DAT Motorcar Co. DAT Motors constructed trucks in addition to the DAT passenger cars. In fact, their output focused on trucks since there was almost no consumer market for passenger cars at the time. Beginning in 1918, the first DAT trucks were assembled for the military market. The low demand from the military market during the 1920s forced DAT to consider merging with other automotive industries. In 1926 the Tokyo-based DAT Motors merged with the Osaka-based Jitsuyo Jidosha Co., Ltd. (実用自動車製造株式会社, Jitsuyō Jidōsha Seizō Kabushiki-Gaisha) also known as Jitsuyo Motors (established 1919, as a Kubota subsidiary) to become DAT Automobile Manufacturing Co., Ltd. (ダット自動車製造株式会社, Datto Jidōsha Seizō Kabushiki-Gaisha) in Osaka until 1932. (Jitsuyo Jidosha began producing a three-wheeled vehicle with an enclosed cab called the Gorham in 1920, and the following year produced a four-wheeled version. From 1923 to 1925, the company produced light cars and trucks under the name of Lila.)

The DAT corporation had been selling full size cars to Japanese consumers under the DAT name since 1914. In 1930, the Japanese government created a ministerial ordinance that allowed cars with engines up to 500 cc to be driven without a license. DAT Automobile Manufacturing began development of a line of 495 cc cars to sell in this new market segment, calling the new small cars "Datson" – meaning "Son of DAT". The name was changed to "Datsun" two years later in 1933.

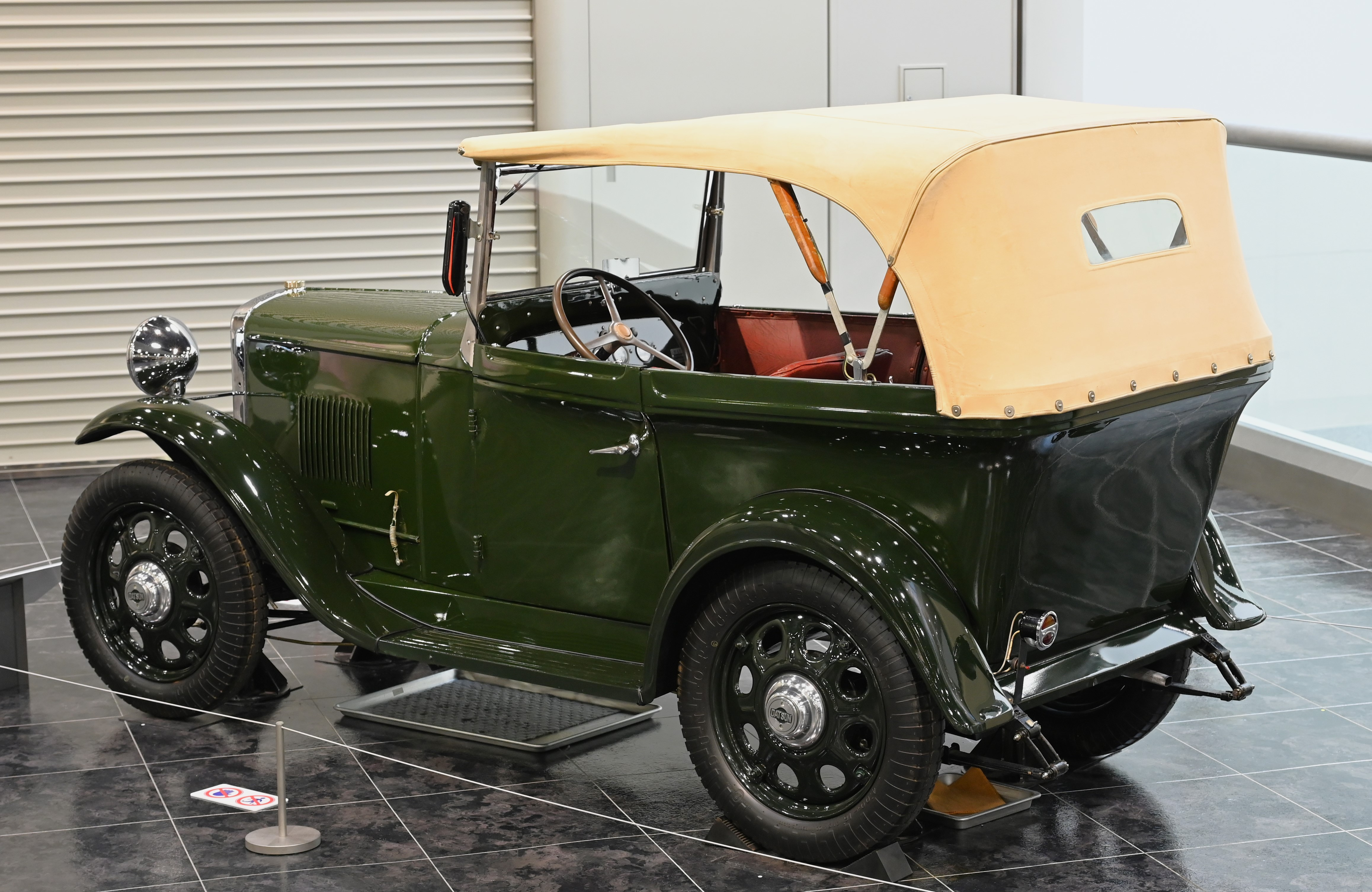
Datsun Type 11

The first prototype Datson was completed in the summer of 1931. The production vehicle was called the Datson Type 10, and "approximately ten" of these cars were sold in 1931. They sold around 150 cars in 1932, now calling the model the Datsun Type 11. In 1933, government rules were revised to permit 750 cc (46 cu in) engines, and Datsun increased the displacement of their microcar engine to the maximum allowed. These larger displacement cars were called Type 12s.

By 1935, the company had established a true production line, following the example of Ford, and were producing a car closely resembling the Austin 7. There is evidence that six of these early Datsuns were exported to New Zealand in 1936, a market they then re-entered in May 1962. In 1937, Datsun's biggest pre-war year, 8593 were built, with some exported to Australia in knock-down form.

After Japan went to war with China in 1937, passenger car production was restricted, so by 1938, Datsun's Yokohama plant concentrated on building trucks for the Imperial Japanese Army.

When the Pacific War ended, Datsun would turn to provide trucks for the Occupation forces. This lasted until car production resumed in 1947. As before the war, Datsun closely patterned their cars on contemporary Austin products: postwar, the Devon and Somerset were selected. For Datsun's smaller cars (and trucks), such as the DB and DS series, they depended on designs based on the pre-war Austin Seven. The heavier trucks, meanwhile, were based on Chevrolet's 1937 design with an engine of Graham-Paige design. Nissan also built the 4W60 Patrol, based on the Willys Jeep, and the 4W70 Carrier, based on the Dodge M37. Not until January 1955 did Datsun offer a fully indigenous design.

That year, the Occupation returned production facilities to Japanese control, and Datsun introduced the 110 saloon and the 110-based 120 pickup.

=== Datsun in the American market ===
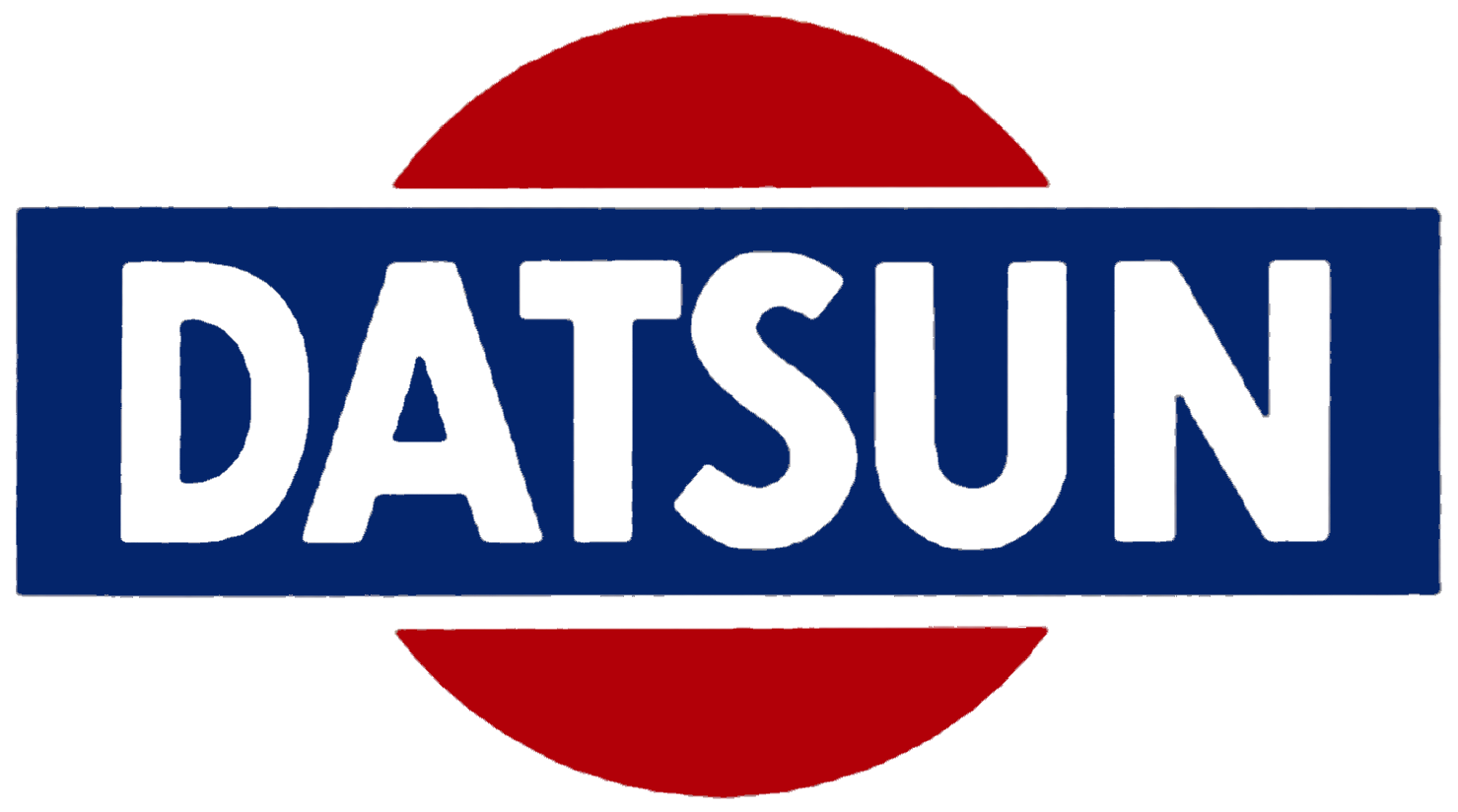
The "classic" Datsun logo, based on the Flag of Japan and Japan's nickname as the "Land of the Rising Sun". After the Nissan rebrand, the logo remained the same, with "Datsun" replaced by "Nissan".

The use of the Datsun name in the American market derives from the name Nissan used for its production cars. In fact, the cars produced by Nissan already used the Datsun brand name, a successful brand in Japan since 1932, long before World War II. Before the entry into the American market in 1958, Nissan did not produce cars under the Nissan brand name; the company only produced trucks. Their in-house-designed cars were always branded as Datsuns. Hence, for Nissan executives it would be only natural to use such a successful name when exporting models to the United States. Only in the 1960s did Datsun begin to brand some automobile models as Nissans, like the Patrol and a small test batch of about 100 Cedric luxury sedans, and then not again until the 1980s. The Japanese market Z-car (sold as the Fairlady Z) also had Nissan badging. In the United States, the Nissan branch was named "Nissan Motor Corporation in U.S.A.", and chartered on September 28, 1960, in California, but the small cars the firm exported to America were still named Datsun.

Corporate choice favored Datsun, so as to distance the parent factory Nissan's association by Americans with Japanese military manufacture. In fact Nissan's involvement in Japan's military industries was substantial. The company's car production at the Yokohama plant shifted towards military needs just a few years after the first passenger cars rolled off the assembly line, on April 11, 1935. By 1939 Nissan's operations had moved to Manchuria, then under Japanese occupation, where its founder and President, Yoshisuke Ayukawa, established the Manchurian Motor Company to manufacture military trucks.

Ayukawa, a well-connected and aggressive risk taker, also made himself a principal partner of the Japanese Colonial Government of Manchukuo. Ultimately, Nissan Heavy Industries emerged near the end of the war as an important player in Japan's war machinery. After the war ended, Soviet Union seized all of Nissan's Manchuria assets, while the Occupation Forces made use of over half of the Yokohama plant. General MacArthur had Ayukawa imprisoned for 21 months as a war criminal. After release he was forbidden from returning to any corporate or public office until 1951. He was never allowed back into Nissan, which returned to passenger car manufacture in 1947 and to its original name of Nissan Motor Company Ltd. in 1949.

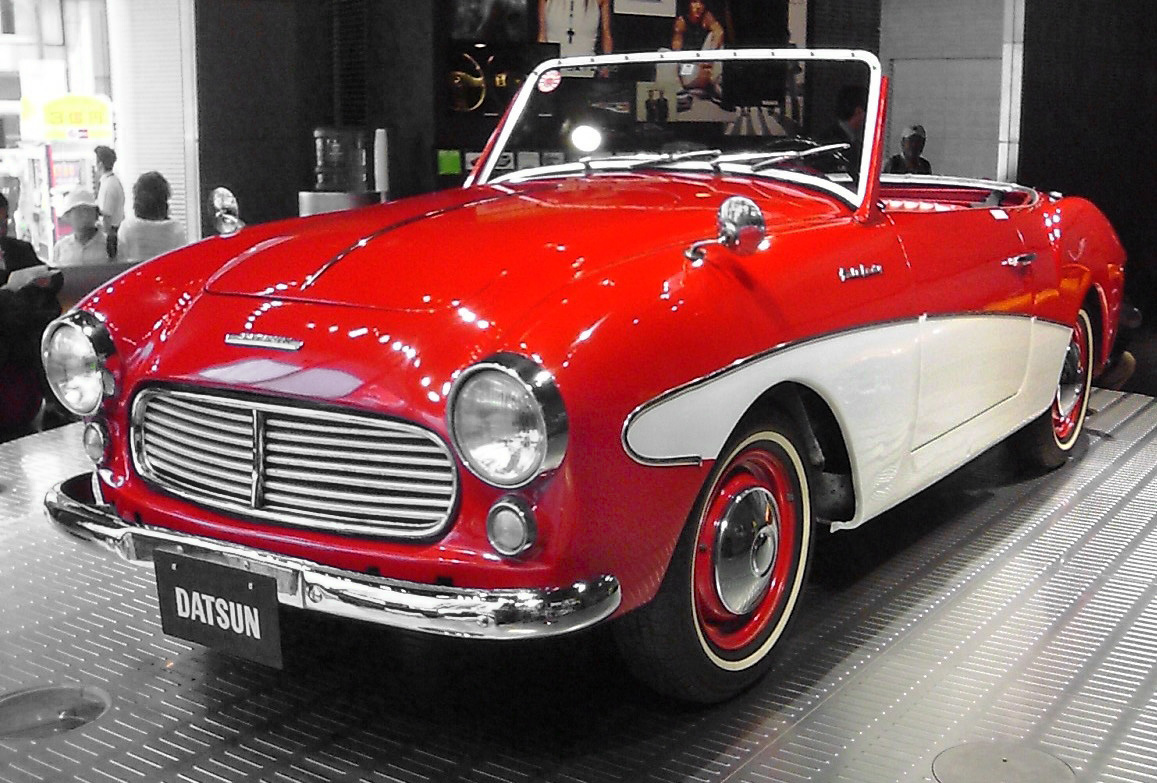
Datsun Fairlady

American service personnel in their teens or early twenties during the Second World War would be in prime car-buying age by 1960, if only to find an economical small second car for their growing family needs. Yutaka Katayama (Mr. "K"), former president of Nissan's American operations, would have had his personal wartime experiences in mind supporting the name Datsun. Katayama's visit to Nissan's Manchuria truck factory in 1939 made him realise the appalling conditions prevalent on the assembly lines, leading him to abandon the firm. In 1945, near the end of the war, Katayama was ordered to return to the Manchurian plant, however he rebuffed these calls and refused to return.

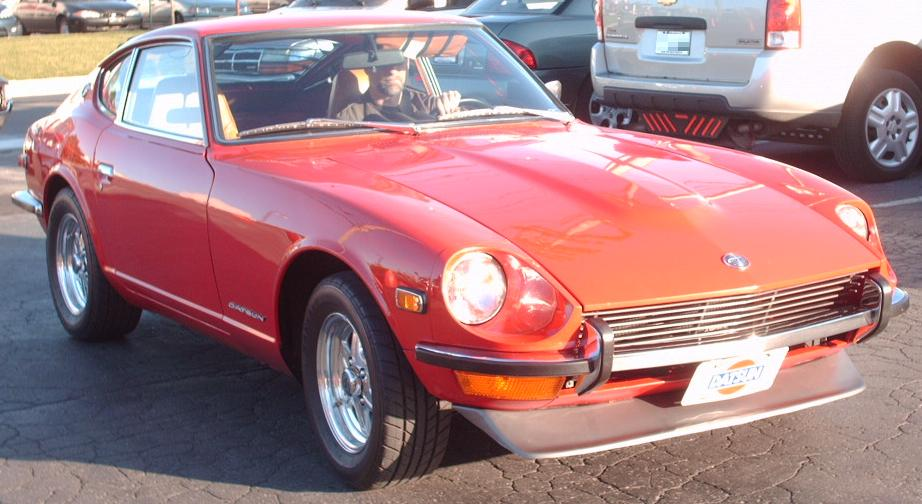
Datsun 240Z (US model)

Katayama desired to build and sell passenger cars to people, not to the military; for him, the name "Datsun" had survived the war with its purity intact, not "Nissan". This obviously led Katayama to have problems with the corporate management. The discouragement felt by Katayama as regards his prospects at Nissan, led to his going on the verge of resigning, when Datsun's 1958 Australian Mobilgas victories vaulted him, as leader of the winning Datsun teams, to national prominence in a Japan bent on regaining international status.

The company's first product to be exported around the world was the 113, with a proprietary 25 hp (19 kW; 25 PS) 850 cc (52 cu in) four-cylinder engine.

Datsun entered the American market in 1958, with sales in California. By 1959, the company had dealers across the U.S. and began selling the 310 (known as Bluebird domestically). From 1962 to 1969 the Nissan Patrol utility vehicle was sold in the United States (as a competitor to the Toyota Land Cruiser J40 series), making it the only Nissan-badged product sold in the US prior to that name's introduction worldwide decades later.

From 1960 on, exports and production continued to grow. A new plant was built at Oppama, south of Yokohama; it opened in 1962. The next year, Bluebird sales first topped 200,000, and exports touched 100,000. By 1964, Bluebird was being built at 10,000 cars a month.

For 1966, Datsun debuted the Sunny/1000, allowing kei car owners to move up to something bigger. That same year, Datsun won the East African Safari Rally and merged with Prince Motors, giving the company the Skyline model range, as well as a test track at Murayama.

The company introduced the Bluebird 510 in 1967. This was followed in 1968 with the iconic 240Z, which proved affordable sports cars could be built and sold profitably: it was soon the world's #1-selling sports car. It relied on an engine based on the Bluebird and used Bluebird suspension components. It would go on to two outright wins in the East African Rally.

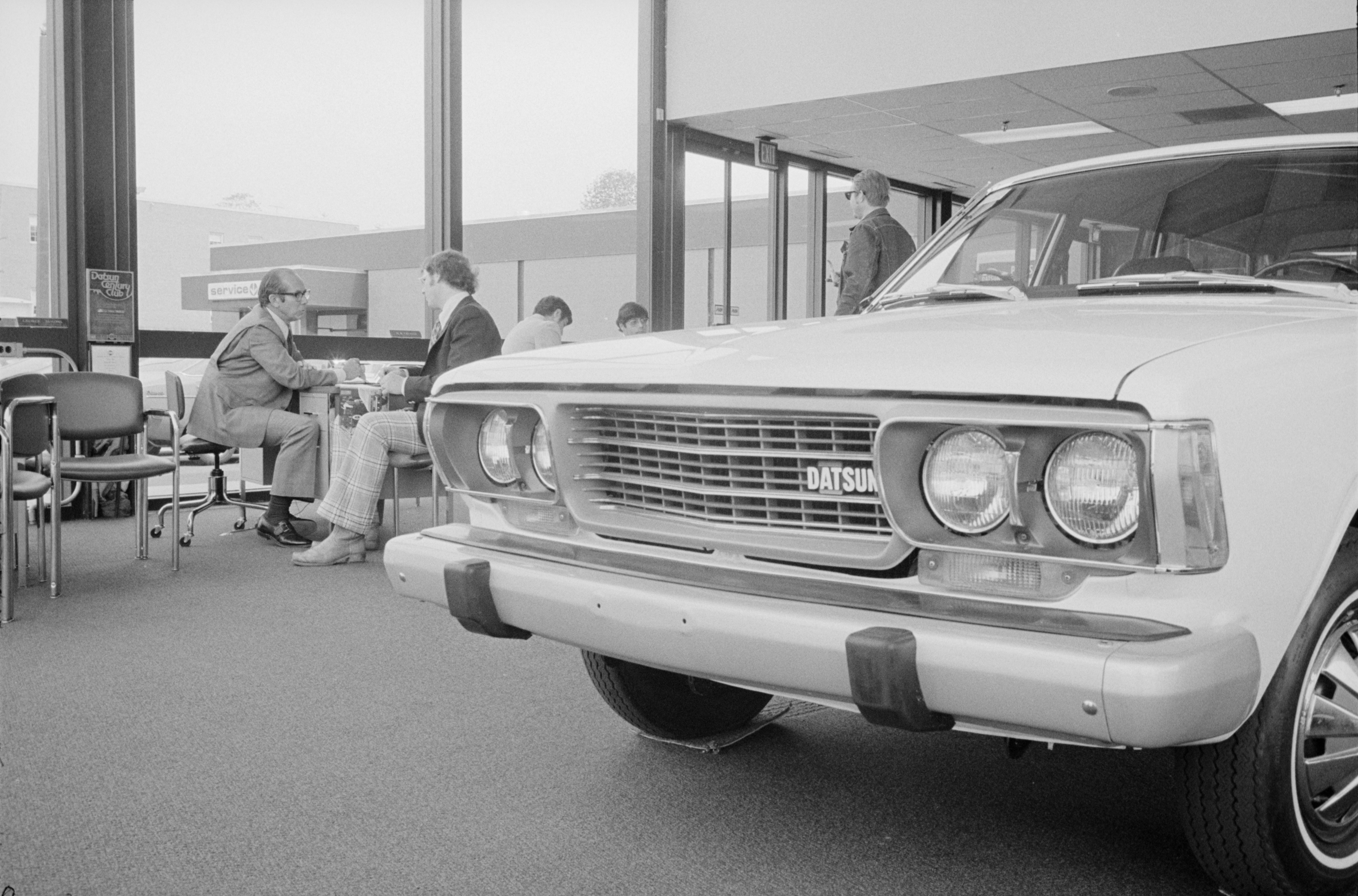
An American Datsun showroom with a 1974 Datsun 610 on display

Katayama was made Vice President of the Nissan North American subsidiary in 1960, and as long as he was involved in decision making, both as North American Vice President from 1960 to 1965, and then President of Nissan Motor Company U.S.A. from 1965 to 1975, the cars were sold as Datsuns. "What we need to do is improve our car's efficiency gradually and creep up slowly before others notice. Then, before Detroit realizes it, we will have become an excellent car maker, and the customers will think so too. If we work hard to sell our own cars, we won't be bothered by whatever the other manufacturers do. If all we do is worry about the other cars in the race, we will definitely lose."

=== Datsun in Europe ===
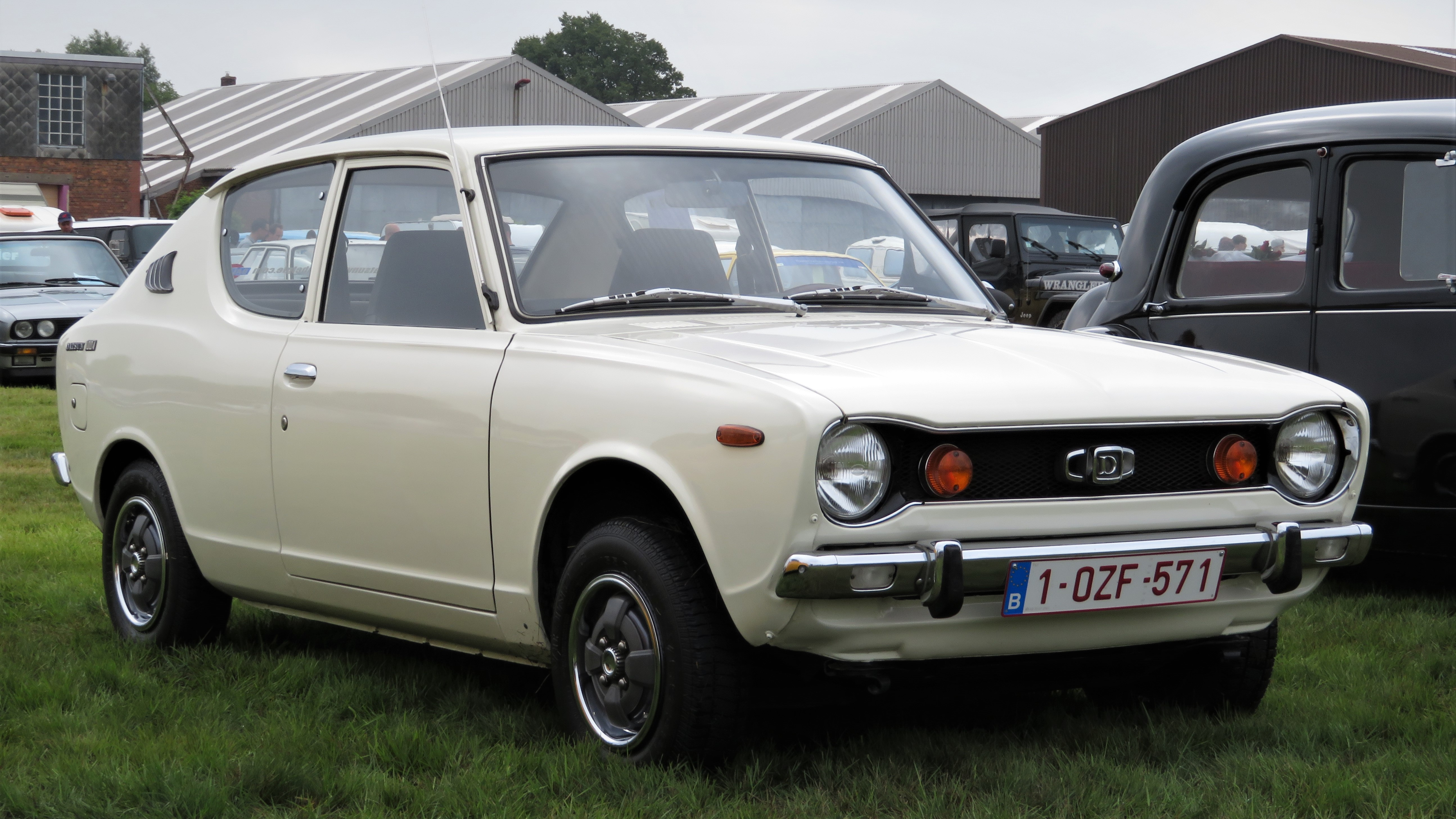
Datsun Cherry 100A (E10, 1970–1977)

In 1935, the first Datsun-badged vehicle was shipped to Britain by car magnate Sir Herbert Austin. The vehicle, a Type 14, was never meant for the road or production, but was a part of a patent dispute as Austin saw a number of similarities to the car with the Austin 7 Ruby. Nissan began exporting Datsun-badged cars to the United Kingdom in 1968, at which time foreign cars were a rarity, with only a small percentage of cars being imported – some of the most popular examples at the time including the Renault 16 from France and Volkswagen Beetle from West Germany. The first European market that Nissan had entered was Finland, where sales began in 1962. Within a few years, it was importing cars to most of Western Europe.

Datsun was particularly successful on the British market. It sold just over 6,000 cars there as late as 1971, but its sales surged to more than 30,000 the following year and continued to climb over the next few years, with well-priced products including the Cherry 100A and Sunny 120Y proving particularly popular, at a time when the British motor industry was plagued by strikes and British Leyland in particular was gaining a reputation for building cars which had issues with build quality and reliability. During the 1970s and early 1980s, Nissan frequently enjoyed the largest market share in Britain of any foreign carmaker.

By the early 1980s, the Nissan badge was gradually appearing on Datsun-badged cars, and eventually the Datsun branding was phased out, the final new car with a Datsun badge being the Micra supermini, launched in Britain from June 1983. By the end of 1984, the Datsun branding had completely disappeared in Britain, although it lingered elsewhere until 1986.

=== Rebranding ===
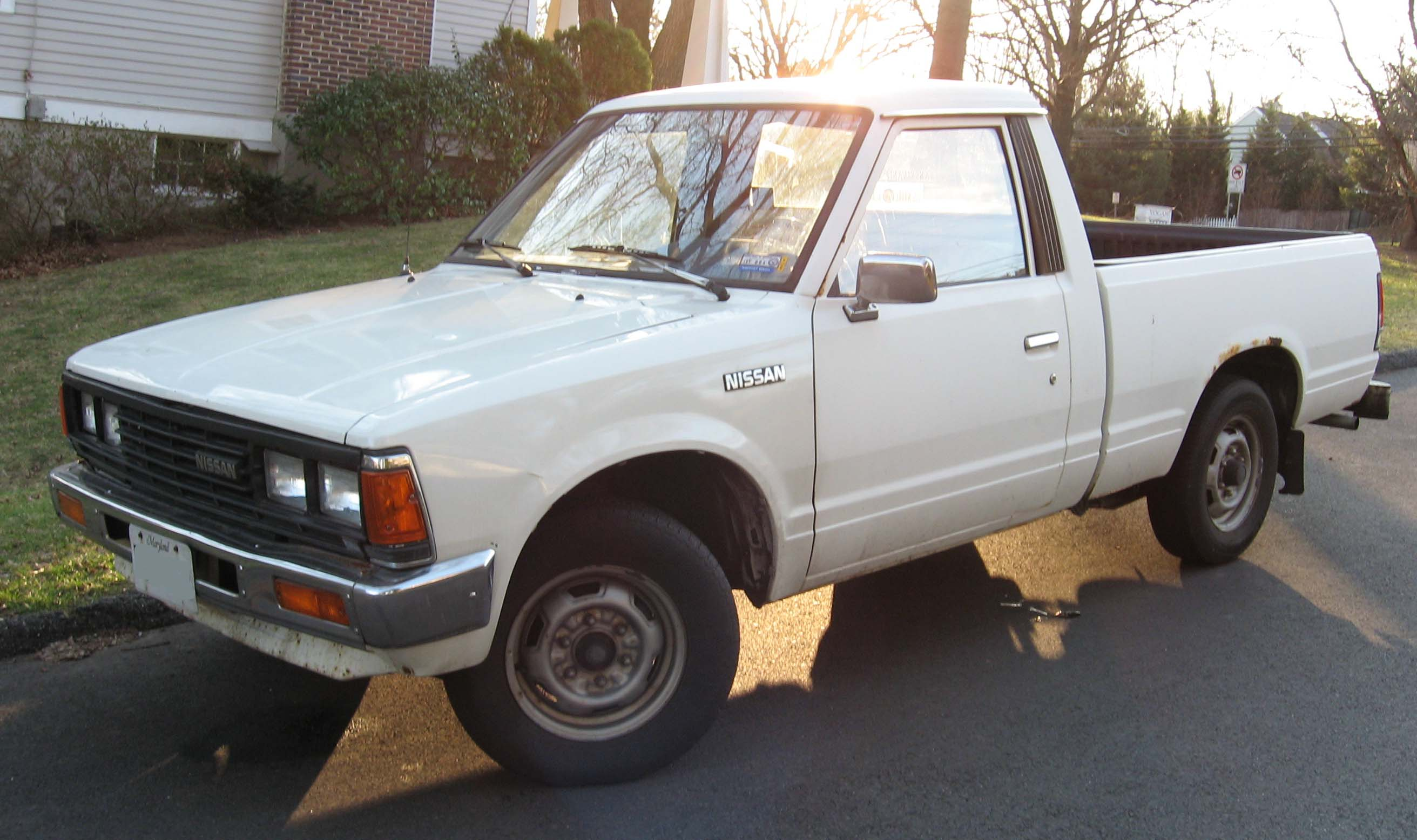
Datsun 720

In Japan, there appears to have been what probably constituted a long-held 'official' company bias against use of the name "Datsun". At the time, Kawamata was a veteran of Nissan, in the last year of his presidency, a powerful figure whose experience in the firm exceeded two decades. His rise to its leadership position occurred in 1957 in part because of his handling of the critical Nissan workers' strike that began May 25, 1953, and ran for 100 days. During his tenure as president, Kawamata stated that he "regretted that his company did not imprint its corporate name on cars, the way Toyota does. 'Looking back, we wish we had started using Nissan on all of our cars,' he says. 'But Datsun was a pet name for the cars when we started exporting.'"

Ultimately, the decision was made to stop using the brand name Datsun worldwide, in order to strengthen the company name Nissan.

"The decision to change the name Datsun to Nissan in the U.S. was announced in the autumn (September/October) of 1981. The rationale was that the name change would help the pursuit of a global strategy. A single name worldwide would increase the possibility that advertising campaigns, brochures, and promotional materials could be used across countries and simplify product design and manufacturing. Further, potential buyers would be exposed to the name and product when traveling to other countries. Industry observers, however, speculated that the most important motivation was that a name change would help Nissan market stocks and bonds in the U.S. They also presumed substantial ego involvement, since the absence of the Nissan name in the U.S. surely rankled Nissan executives who had seen Toyota and Honda become household words."

Ultimately, the name change campaign lasted for a three-year period from 1982 to 1984 – Datsun badged vehicles had been progressively fitted with small "Nissan" and "Datsun by Nissan" badges from the late 1970s onward until the Nissan name was given prominence in 1983 – although in some export markets, vehicles continued to wear both the Datsun and Nissan badges until 1986. In the United Kingdom for example, the Nissan name initially was used as a prefix to the model name, with Datsun still being used as the manufacturer's name (e.g. Datsun-Nissan Micra) from 1982 until 1984. In the United States, the Nissan name was used for some new vehicles for 1982 such as the Nissan Stanza and the Nissan Sentra while the Datsun name was used on existing vehicles through 1983 including – confusingly enough – the Datsun Maxima, which like the Stanza and Sentra was also a new model for 1982, albeit as a renamed Datsun 810. The Z continue in production in North America as of 2025, as Nissan's last direct link to its Datsun years.

The name change had cost Nissan a figure in the region of US$500 million. Operational costs included the changing of signs at 1,100 Datsun dealerships, and amounted to US$30 million. Another US$200 million were spent during the 1982 to 1986 advertising campaigns, where the "Datsun, We Are Driven!" campaign (which was adopted in late 1977 in the wake of the 1973 oil crisis and subsequent 1979 energy crisis) yielded to "The Name is Nissan" campaign (the latter campaign was used for some years beyond 1985). Another US$50 million was spent on Datsun advertisements that were paid for but stopped or never used. Five years after the name change program was over, Datsun still remained more familiar than Nissan.

=== Datsun truck ===
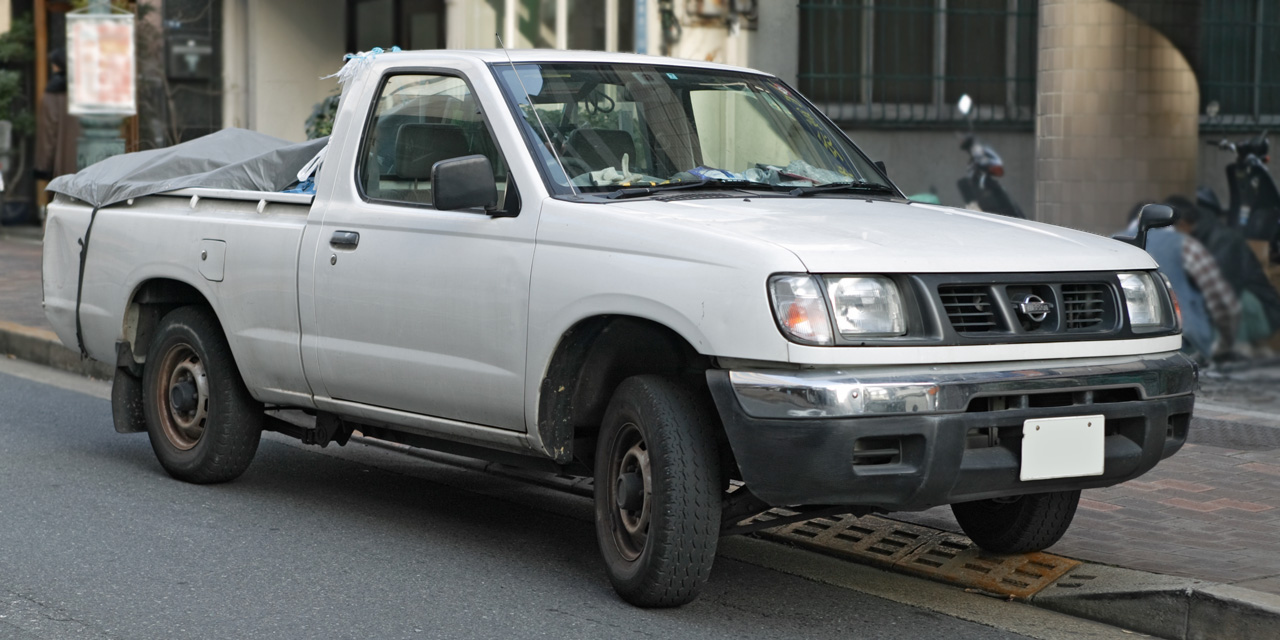
Nissan Datsun

In 2001, Nissan marketed its D22 pick-up model in Japan with the name Datsun. This time however, the use of the brand name was wholly restricted to this one specific model name. Production of this model was between May 2001 and October 2002.

== Relaunch ==
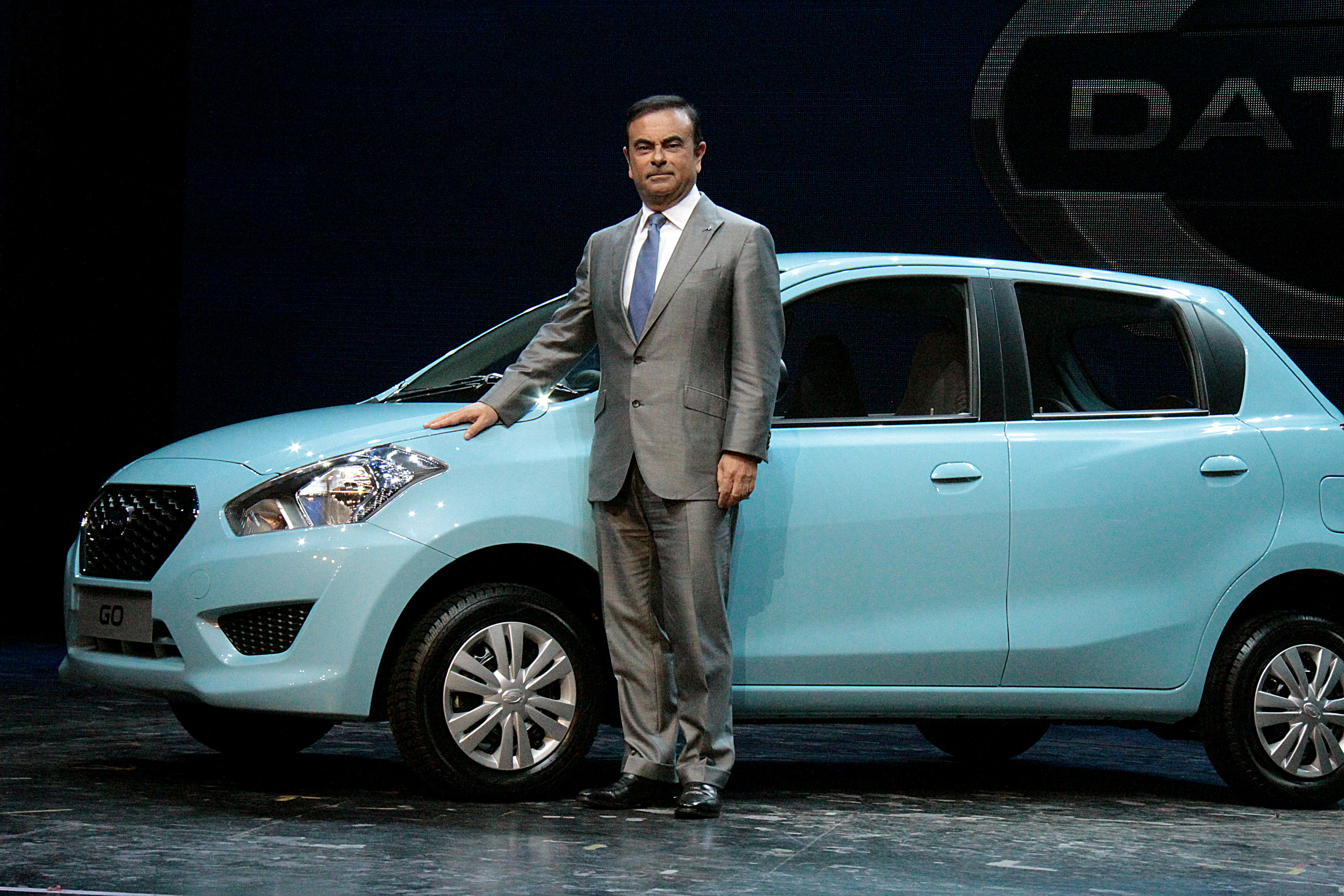
Carlos Ghosn at Datsun Go launch in New Delhi, India, 2013

On 20 March 2012, it was announced that Nissan would revive the Datsun marque as a low-cost car brand for use in Indonesia, Nepal, South Africa, India, and Russia, and on 15 July 2013, nearly three decades after it was phased out, the name was formally resurrected. Nissan said the brand's reputation for value and reliability would help it gain market share in emerging markets. The Datsun brand was relaunched in New Delhi, India, with the Datsun Go, which went on sale in India in early 2014. Datsun models are sold in Indonesia, Russia, India, Nepal and South Africa since 2014. The brand entered Kazakhstan in 2015, and Belarus and Lebanon in 2016.

The Datsun Go was being built at the Renault-Nissan plant in Chennai, India. It was also produced in Indonesia. The Go is based on the same Nissan V platform as the Nissan Micra. The Go+, a 5+2 seater station wagon, was added to the range in September 2013.

In February 2014, the redi-Go concept car was presented. The redi-Go crossover became available in India mid-2015.

In April 2014, the first model for the Russian market, the Datsun on-Do based on Lada Granta, was launched.

In November 2019, it was announced that Datsun would stop its production in Indonesia and Russia in 2020.

In April 2022, Nissan announced that it is shutting down the production of Datsun cars in India.

== Leadership ==
- Yoshisuke Aikawa (1933–1946)
- Katsuji Kawamata (in Japan) (1957–1973)
- Yutaka Katayama (in North America) (1965–1975)
- Jose Roman (2013–2018)

== Models ==
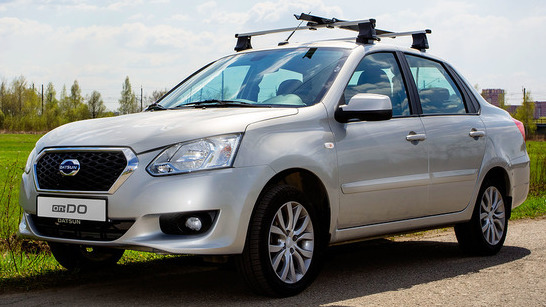
Datsun on-Do (2014–2020)

- Datsun Go (2013–2022)
- Datsun Go+ (2013–2022)
- Datsun on-Do (2014–2020)
- Datsun mi-Do (2015–2020)
- Datsun redi-Go (2016–2022)
- Datsun Cross (2018–2020)

== See also ==
- Datsun Sports
- Laurence Hartnett
- Yutaka Katayama
- Nissan
- Nissan Motor Car Carrier
- Sports Car International Top Sports Cars

== Bibliography ==
- Daniels, Jeff (1974). "Datsun: Powerful Challenger from the East"". In Northey, Tom (ed.). World of Automobiles. Vol. 5. London: Orbis. pp. 495–497.
