= Datsun on-Do =

Russia-exclusive Nissan subcompact saloon

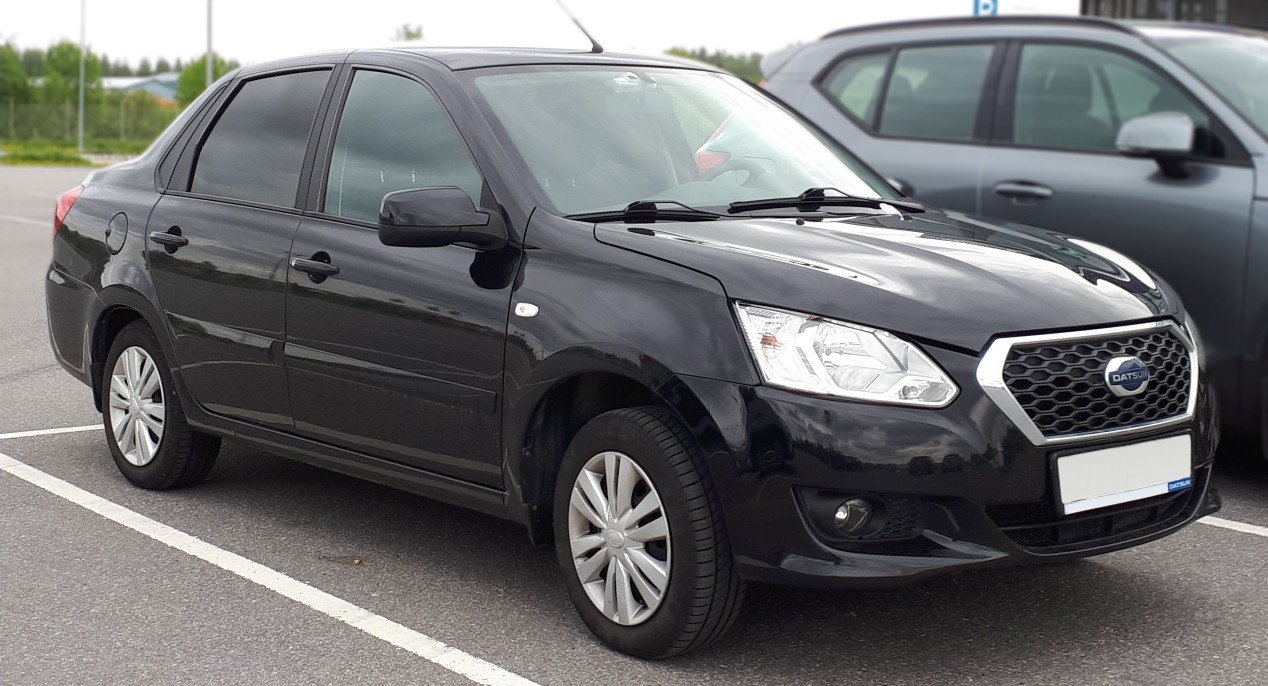

Overview
- Manufacturer: Datsun (Nissan)
- Model code: BD0
- Also called: Lada Granta
- Production: July 2014 – December 2020
- Assembly: Russia: Tolyatti (AvtoVAZ)

Body and chassis
- Class: Subcompact car
- Body style: 4-door saloon
- Layout: Front-engine, front-wheel-drive
- Related: Datsun mi-Do

Powertrain
- Engine: 1.6 L VAZ-11186 I4
- Transmission: 5-speed manual 4-speed automatic

Dimensions
- Wheelbase: 2,476 mm (97.5 in)
- Length: 4,337 mm (170.7 in)
- Width: 1,700 mm (66.9 in)
- Height: 1,500 mm (59.1 in)

The Datsun on-Do is a subcompact car manufactured specifically for the Russian market under the Datsun brand of Nissan Motor Company. It is a rebadged and restyled version of the AutoVAZ-developed Lada Granta and it also has its own VAZ-index number, 2195. The on-Do was launched in Russia on 4 April 2014, and AutoVAZ started serial manufacturing of the car on 14 July 2014. The word "Do" is related to a Japanese traditional culture that can be translated into "move", while "on" indicates an adjective or verb.

== Overview ==
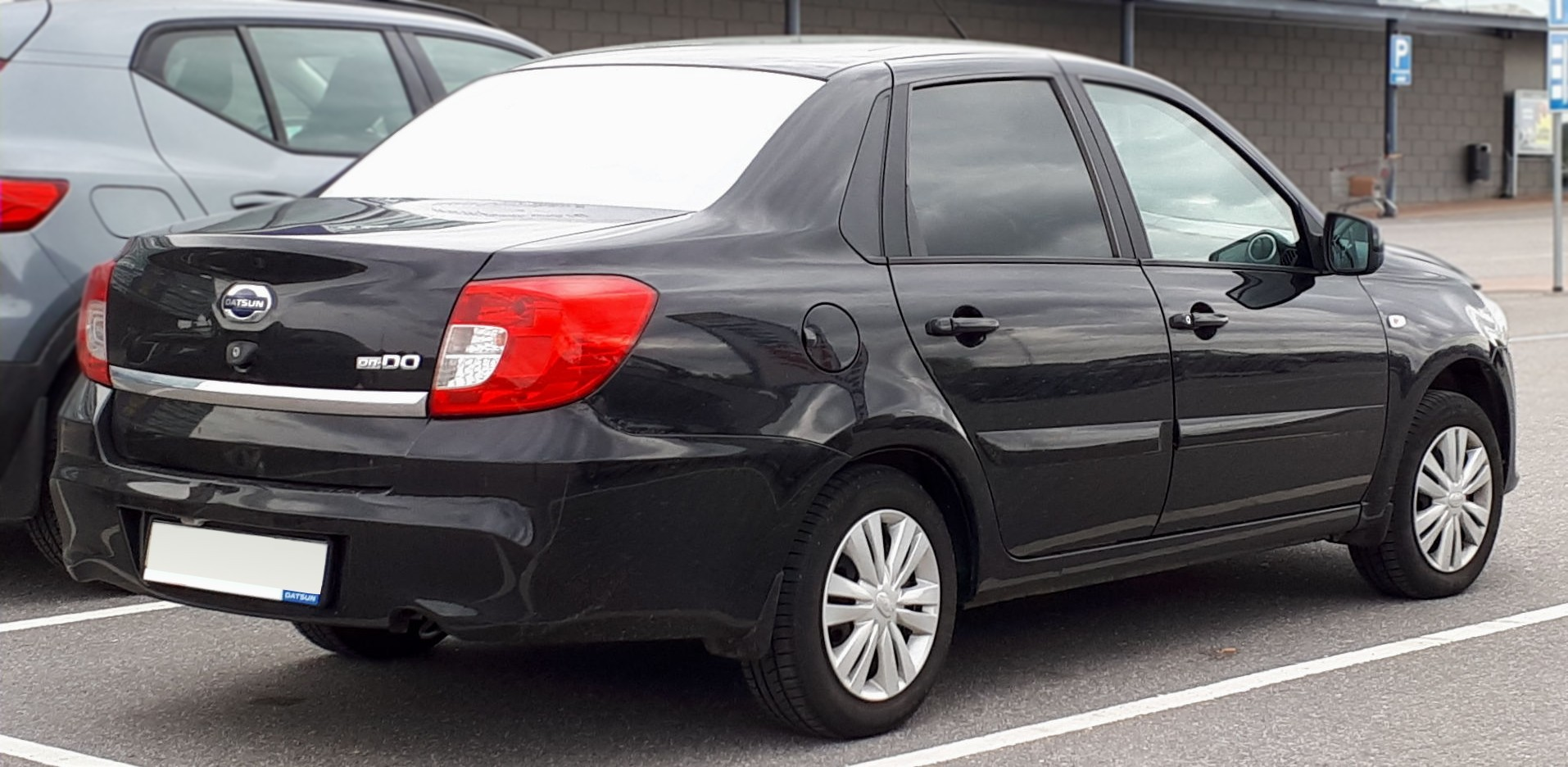
Rear view

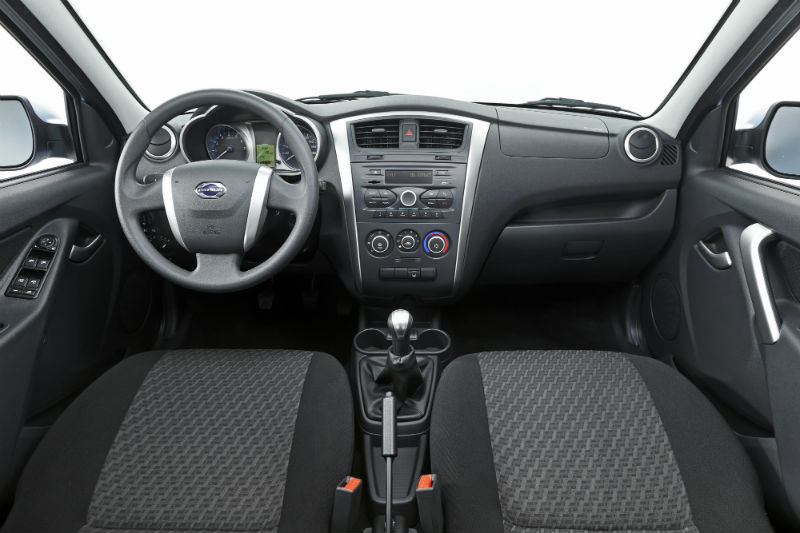
Interior

The on-Do is 77 mm (3.0 in) longer than the Lada Granta and has a different front and back similar to other Datsun models. Its wheelbase, height and width are unchanged.

The on-Do uses a 1.6 L (98 cu in) straight-four engine that produces 87 hp (65 kW; 88 PS). The power is transmitted to the wheels using a five-speed manual transmission. A 4-speed Jatco automatic gearbox is available since 2016.

As for the saloon's transmission, Datsun decided not to develop their own, but to take the readily available VAZ five-speed manual. The manufacturer claims that, for the Datsun on-DO front-wheel drive car, the domestic gearbox was slightly upgraded to reduce vibration and noise. The gear ratio of the main pair of the Datsun mechanical box is 3.7, as is the case with Granta. The manufacturer decided not to equip the saloons with automatic transmissions (ATs). However, the AT would appear on the Datsun mi-DO hatchback.
