= Datsun mi-Do =

Russia-exclusive Nissan subcompact hatchback

Datsun mi-Do (BD0)
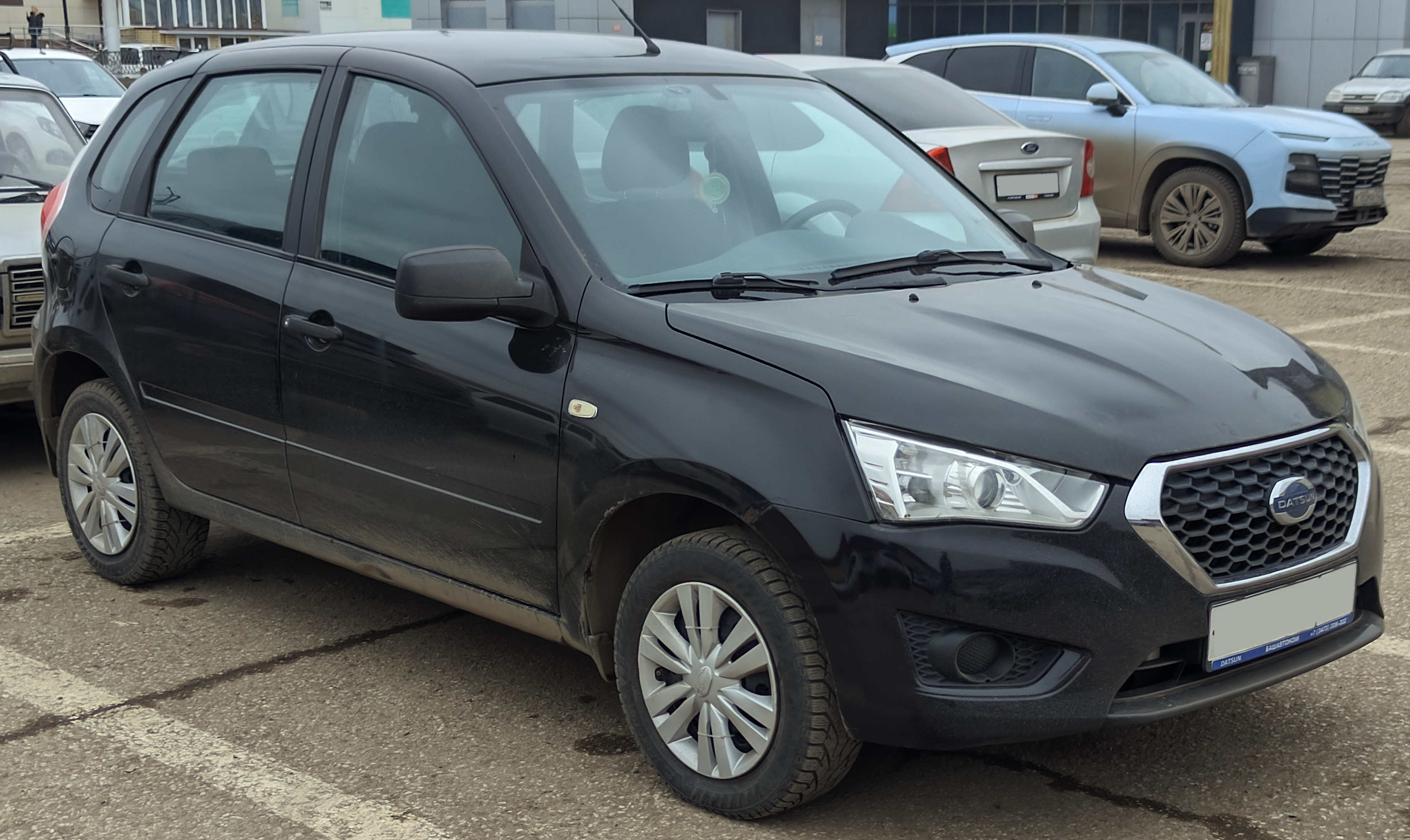

Overview
- Manufacturer: Datsun (Nissan)
- Model code: BD0
- Also called: Lada Kalina
- Production: February 2015 – December 2020
- Assembly: Russia: Tolyatti (AvtoVAZ)

Body and chassis
- Class: Subcompact car
- Body style: 5-door hatchback
- Layout: Front-engine, front-wheel-drive
- Related: Datsun on-Do

Powertrain
- Engine: 1.6 L VAZ-11186 I4
- Transmission: 5-speed manual 4-speed automatic

Dimensions
- Wheelbase: 2,476 mm (97.5 in)
- Length: 3,893 mm (153.3 in)
- Width: 1,670 mm (65.7 in)
- Height: 1,500 mm (59.1 in)

The Datsun mi-Do is a subcompact car manufactured specifically for the Russian market under the Datsun brand of Nissan Motor Company. It is a rebadged and restyled version of the AutoVAZ developed Lada Kalina. The mi-Do was presented in August 2014.

== Overview ==
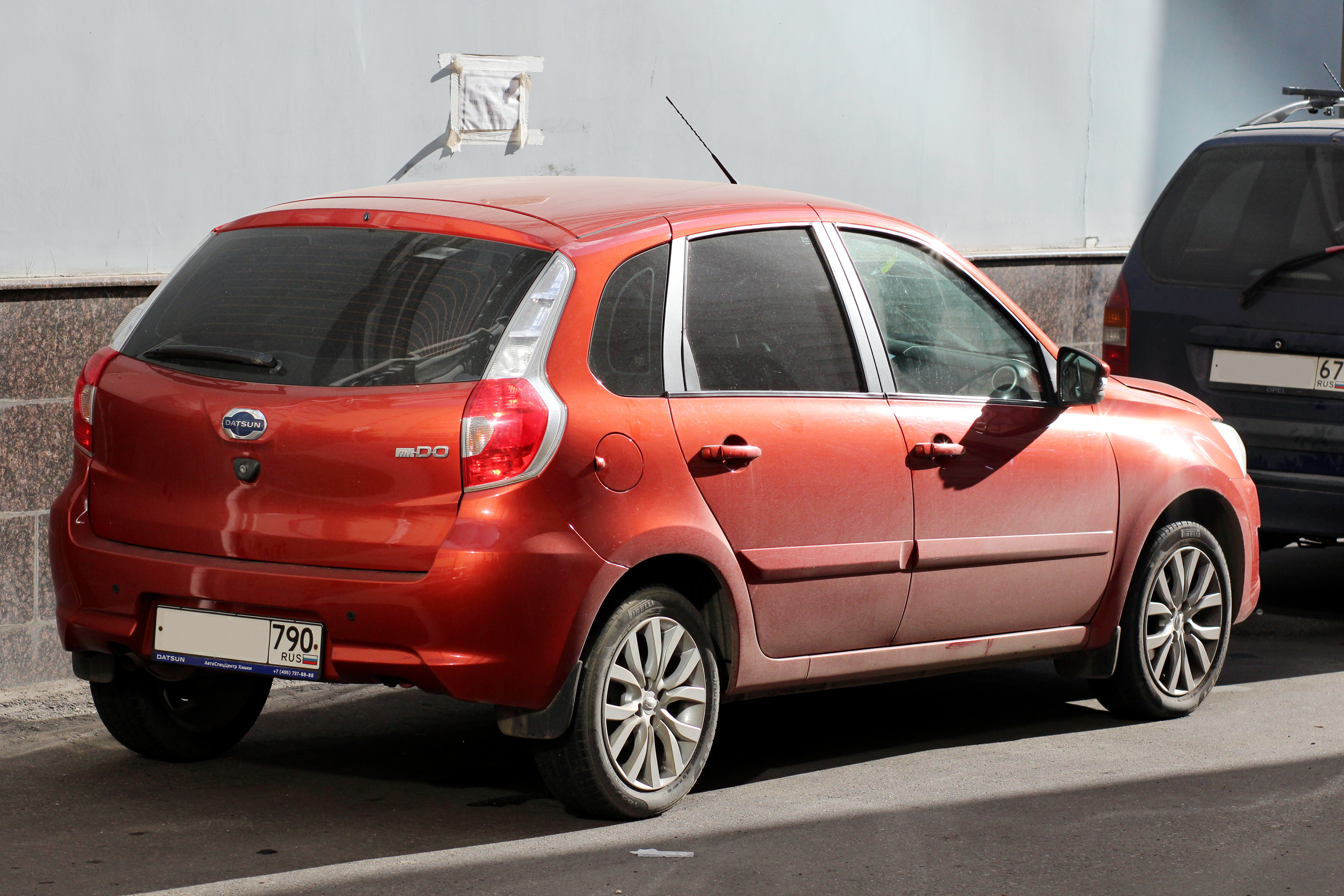
Rear view

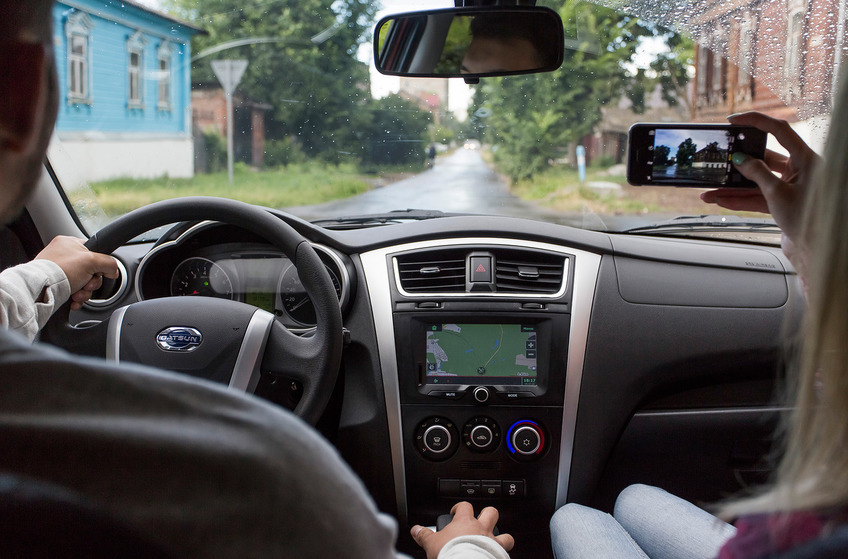
Interior

The Datsun mi-Do was premiered on August 27, 2014 at the Moscow Motor Show as the second model of the brand to enter the Russian market after the Datsun on-DO sedan.

Production assembly of the Datsun mi-DO model began in February 2015, and it went on sale on February 24, 2015. Was offered with both manual and automatic transmission. As standard, any Datsun mi-DO has ABS, an on-board computer, electric power steering, heated seats, electric adjustment, heated mirrors and two airbags. The most expensive configuration, in addition, is equipped with alloy wheels, a multimedia system, air conditioning, a stabilization system, parking sensors and four airbags.

The car is equipped with 1.6-litre engine (82 and 87 hp) paired with 5-speed manual or 4-speed automatic gearbox manufactured by Jatco.

In summer 2020, Nissan decided to discontinue the Datsun brand including both Avto-VAZ made Datsun mi-DO and Datsun on-DO models. Production of new cars was discontinued by the end of 2020.

== Engine ==
- Engine configuration: 1596 cc inline-4, 2 valves per cylinder
- Power: 64 kW (86 hp) @ 5100 rpm
- Torque: 140 Nm @ 2700 rpm
- Bore × stroke: 82 mm / 75.6 mm
- Compression ratio: 10.6:1
- Timing drive: Belt
- Top speed: 173 km/h (107 mph)
- 0-100 km/h: 12.2 seconds
