= Brisa =

- Pronunciation: /ˈbriːsə/
- Gender: Female

Origin
- Origin: Spanish language
- Meaning: Breeze

Other names
- Related names: Briseida, Briza

Brisa or Briza may refer to:

== People ==
- Brisa Carraro, Argentine artistic gymnast
- Brisa Roché, American singer-songwriter
- Brisa Hennessy, Costa Rican olympic athlete

== Companies and brands ==
- Brisa - Auto-estradas de Portugal S.A., a Portuguese company that manages several highway systems
- Brisa drink, a soft drink produced in Madeira, Portugal by Empresa de Cervejas da Madeira
- Brisa, a Sabancı Group company in Turkey, the official producer and distributor of Bridgestone tyres from Japan
- Kia Brisa, a car built by Kia Motors, based in the Mazda Famillia
- Dodge Brisa, a Venezuelan car model produced by the MMC Automoritz S.A.
- Gruta Brisa Azul, a cave in the Azores.

== Winds ==
- Brisa, a north-easterly wind which blows on the coast of South America or an east wind which blows on Puerto Rico during the trade wind season
- Brisa, the north-easterly monsoon in the Philippines

== Plant ==
- Briza, a genus of grasses, native to northern temperate regions

== See also ==
- Breeze (disambiguation)
- Las Brisas Observatory
- Brisas Hotels and Resorts
- Cerro Quiabuc-Las Brisas Natural Reserve
