= Estelí =

Estelí Villa de San Antonio de Pavia de Estelí
- Municipality
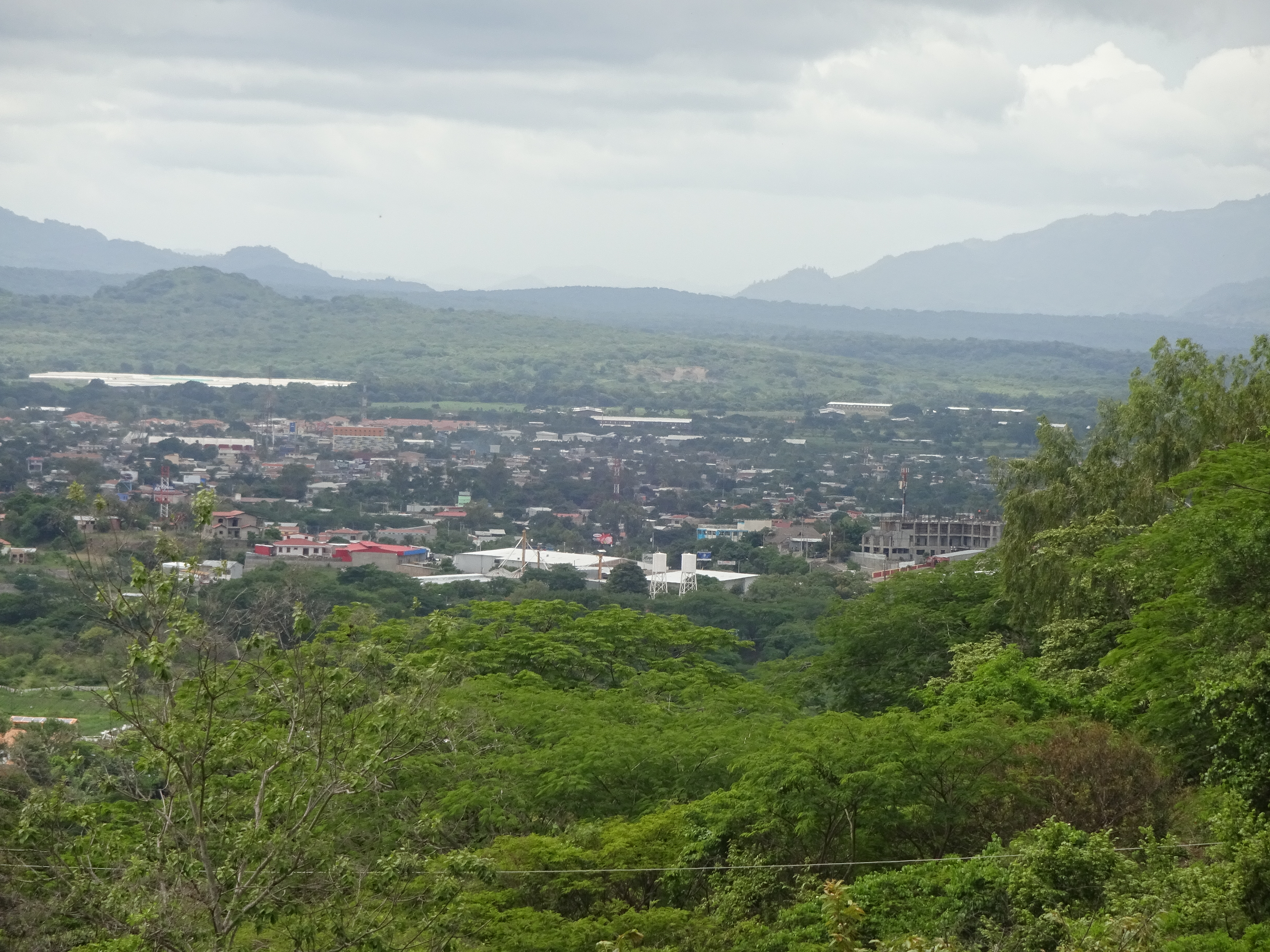
- Panoramic view of the City of Estelí

- Flag Seal
- Nickname: " Diamante de la Segovia" ("The Diamond of the Segovia ") name created by Oscar Corea Molina in his radio show "Trampolin 43"
- Motto: "Estelí, amante del presente, forjador del futuro" ("Estelí, lover of the present, builder of the future")
- Location within Nicaragua Location within North America
- Coordinates: 13°05′N 86°21′W
- Country: Nicaragua
- Department: Estelí Department
- Foundation: 1685

Government
  - Mayor: Francisco Ramón Valenzuela Blandón
  - Vice Mayor: Rosa Argentina Rugama Flores

Area
  - Municipality: 796 km^{2} (307 sq mi)
- Elevation: 843.97 m (2,768.9 ft)

Population (2022 estimate)
  - Municipality: 131,179
  - Density: 165/km^{2} (427/sq mi)
  - Urban: 111,244 (8th Nicaragua)
- Time zone: UTC-6
- Climate: Aw
- Website: Official website

Estelí (Spanish pronunciation: [esteˈli]), officially Villa de San Antonio de Pavia de Estelí is a city and municipality within the Estelí department. It is the 8th largest city in Nicaragua due to the high urbanization of its municipality, at 84.8%, with an urban population of 111,244 (2022 estimate). It is also the eighth-largest municipality, and an active commercial center in the north, known as "the Diamond of the Segovia" (this name being created by Oscar Corea Molina in his radio show "Trampolin 43”) and the de facto capital of the north.

Estelí is on the Pan-American Highway, 150 km north of Managua. It enjoys a temperate climate most of the year due to its location in the north central highlands at a mean elevation of 844 m (2769 ft) above sea level. The city is also surrounded by forested mountains of pines, oaks, and walnuts, and plateaus up to 1600 m above sea level, some of which are protected as natural reserves.

== History ==
The first settlement of what would become the City of Estelí occurred in Villa Vieja in 1685. It was founded by a group of Spaniards fleeing Nueva Segovia which at that time suffered from pirate attacks. Villa Vieja was then replaced by a new settlement (San Antonio de Pavia) from where the city of Estelí has grown. Today there is evidence of the first church in the Villa Vieja sector of the city.

The town is described in 1858 as "a little town in a small plain through which winds the river of the same name..." It is described as having a grist-mill and that "the country produces considerable wheat of medium quality." Estelí was described in 1920 as having 8,000 inhabitants and as being a rich and growing center.

Estelí was the scene of heavy fighting in the civil war against the Somoza government from 1978 to 1979. The city was heavily air-bombed by the regime's National Guard and burnt by the FSLN guerrillas, which reduced many of the city's buildings to rubble. The human casualties were around 15,000; many of them were youths massacred on suspicion of being part of the insurrection due to the infiltration of anti-government guerillas from the Pacific of Nicaragua whom used the city as a war theater. Estelí rebuilt all but some structures, such as the Teatro Montenegro and the Government Palace, and a few may still show bullet holes.

== Economy and tourism ==
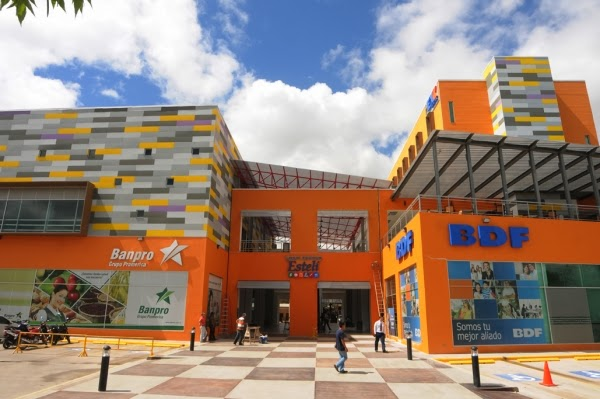
A shopping center in Estelí

The land around Estelí has a suitable climate for growing tobacco for use in cigars, and the town became a refuge for Cuban cigar makers after the Cuban Revolution in 1959. Estelí is one of the most important cigar-producing cities in the world. Estelí also has many language schools. Restaurants and hotels cater to tourists traveling to nearby natural reserves and other parts of the region. Natural Reserves around the area include Miraflor, Tisey-Estanzuela, Las Brisas-Quiabuc, Tomabú, Tepesomoto, and Moropotente.

According to the World Bank and International Finance Corporation's Municipal Scorecard 2008, which complements the annual Doing Business report, the municipality of Estelí ranks 1st and 2nd, out of 143 municipalities in ten Latin American countries, in quality and efficiency to obtain a construction permit and municipal operating license respectively. Estelí has improved its performance from the Municipal Scorecard 2007, where it ranked 5th out of 65 municipalities in five countries.

== Infrastructure ==
Estelí has near-full population coverage with its water-supply system. It also has extensive sewage disposal coverage.

At least three airfields have been built in Estelí throughout history, although none exists today. One of the first airfields documented played the role of alternate airport from 1930 to 1934 when TACA established the service to carry passengers with an El Salvador-Tegucigalpa-Danli-Ocotal-Estelí-Managua route. La Thompson, which is three miles north of Estelí, is where the second airstrip was built and used by a company named "Thonsson Corwell" to help complete a stretch of the Pan-American Highway. The third airfield was built in the north end of town in the 1980s but has now been urbanized.

In 1940 efforts were made to expand Nicaragua's railroad from El Sauce to the north via Estelí. Thirteen kilometers of rail, the town of Río Grande, and a railroad bridge were built with the intention of taking the rail up to Estelí along the Aquespalapa or Villanueva river, which originates in the Quiabuc mountains; however, the project was abandoned. In 1950 there was a proposal to create a railroad branch from Estelí to Matagalpa which would eventually connect the city to other parts of the country including Prinzapolka Port in the Caribbean and Managua.

== Sports ==
Estelí is home to one of the most popular football clubs in the country, the Real Estelí, nicknamed "El Tren del Norte" ("The Train of the North"). They play their home games at the Estadio Independencia, a name created by Oscar Corea Molina. Real Estelí Baloncesto plays in the Basketball Champions League Americas.

It is also home to a professional baseball team, Estelí, which makes it one of only three cities in the country with both a professional football (soccer) and baseball team. During the 1970s, Estelí participated in the "Roberto Clemente" baseball tournament and had one of the best baseball teams in the country with the help of one-time big league players like Porfi Altamirano and Albert Williams.

Estelí also has a professional cycling team called Real Estelí Ciclismo, which is member of the Cycling Federation of Nicaragua. In May 2019, Real Estelí won first place in the Elite group of the Europa Tour 2019 cycling competition in San Salvador, El Salvador, hosted by the Cycling Federation of El Salvador. The team also won second place in the Master B category.

== Gastronomy ==
Due to its altitude Estelí can be quite chilly at night or in the morning and even cold in winter. Thus, like all northern mountainous regions of Nicaragua, Estelí's gastronomy consists of a hearty mountain diet of beef, game, veal, rabbit, geese, sausages, and heavy soups like albóndiga, queso, res, etc. There is a high consumption of milk products like smoked or spicy cheeses like ahumado and picante, and regional corn-based dishes such as montucas, salty-sour repochetas, and semi-sweet güirilas. For breakfast, chorizo, refried beans, sour cream, and home-made style bread are more common and black coffee is the king of drinks any time of the day. Though illegal, cususa (a clear alcoholic drink) is also consumed, especially on the outskirts of the city or in small cantinas (bars).

== Notable people ==
- Pedro X. Molina, award-winning cartoonist
- Ramón Otoniel Olivas, Nicaraguan international footballer and national team manager
- Frank Pineda, filmmaker and producer
- Widman Talavera, footballer
- Clara Isabel Alegría Vides, poet

== International relations ==
=== Twin towns – Sister cities ===
Estelí is twinned with:

Bielefeld (Germany); Delft (Netherlands); Évry, Essonne (France); La Habra, California (United States); Linköping, Sweden	Sant Feliu de Llobregat, Spain; Sheffield, United Kingdom; Stavanger (Norway); Stevens Point, Wisconsin (United States)

In Sheffield, a section of the promenade alongside the River Don in Sheffield City Centre is named Estelí Parade.

== Gallery ==
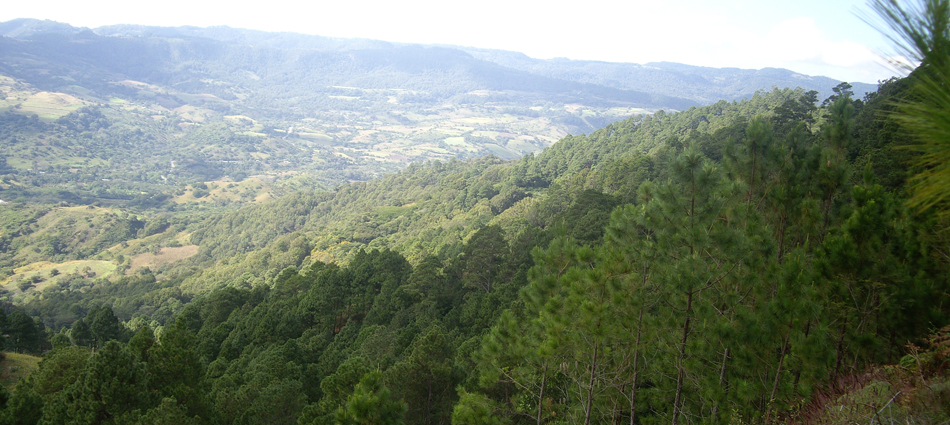
Tomabú hill with a height of 1,445 meters, it is covered with pine forests.

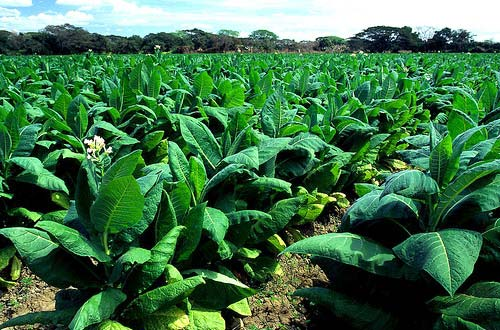
Some of the tobacco fields that are common north of town.

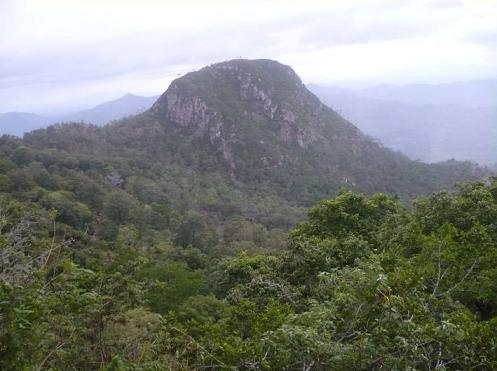
Apaguajil Hill, Tisey - Estanzuela Nature Reserve.

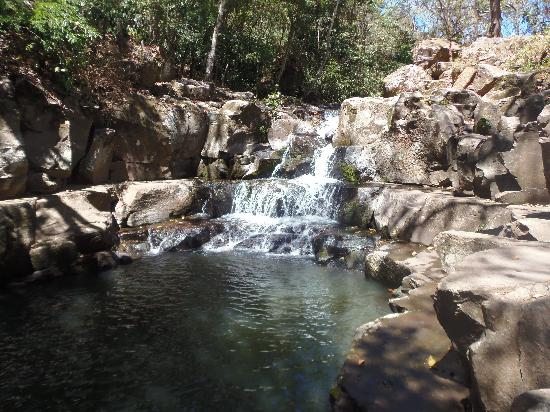
Waterfall in Miraflor Nature Reserve.

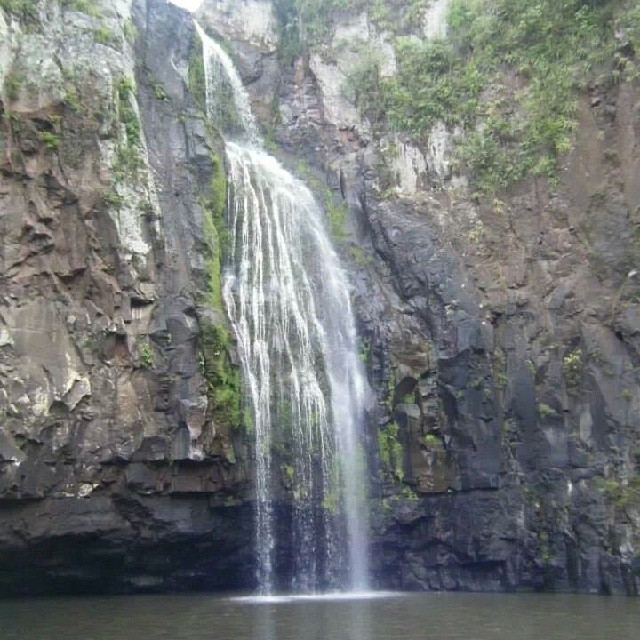
Salto Estanzuela (Estanzuela waterfall) located in the Tisey-Estanzuela Natural Reserve just south of town.

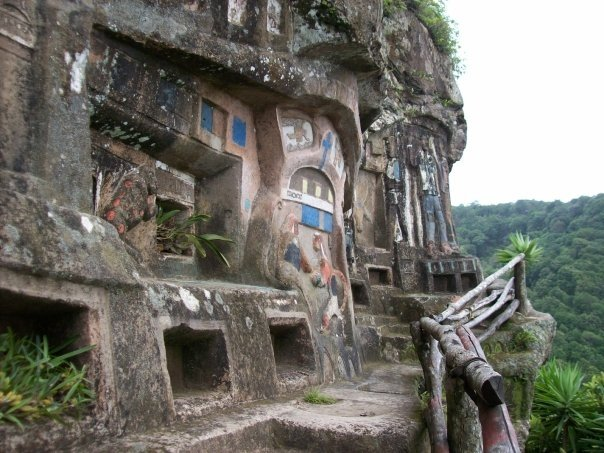
Jalacate Sculptures just outside town.

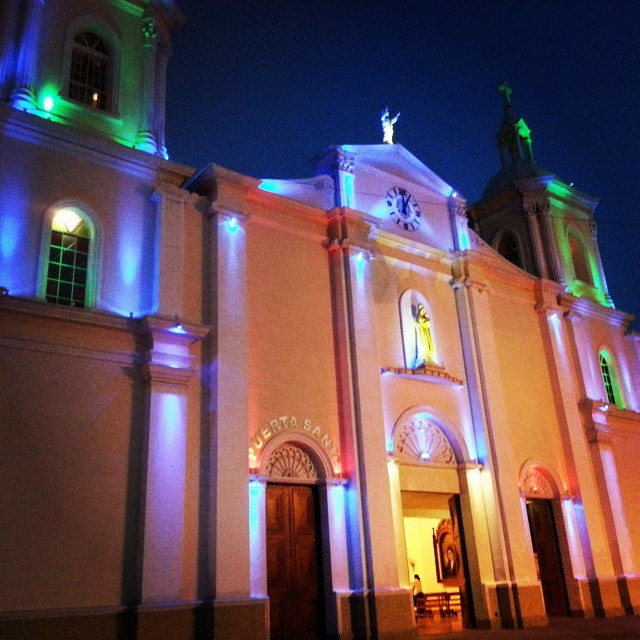
Cathedral at night

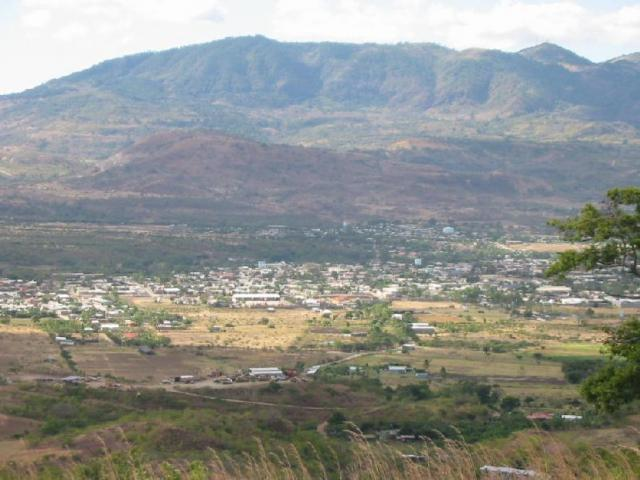
South end of Estelí looking towards Las Brisas-Quiabuc Natural Reserve

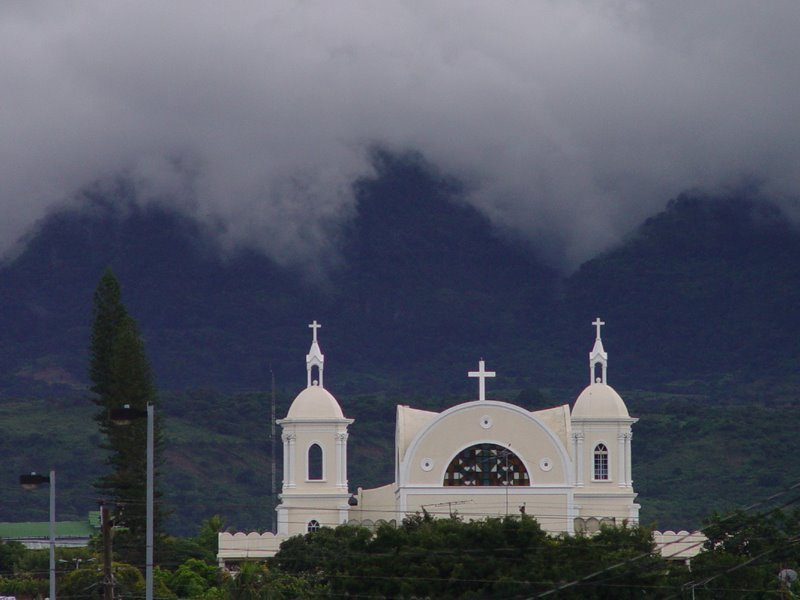
Nuestra Señora del Rosario Cathedral

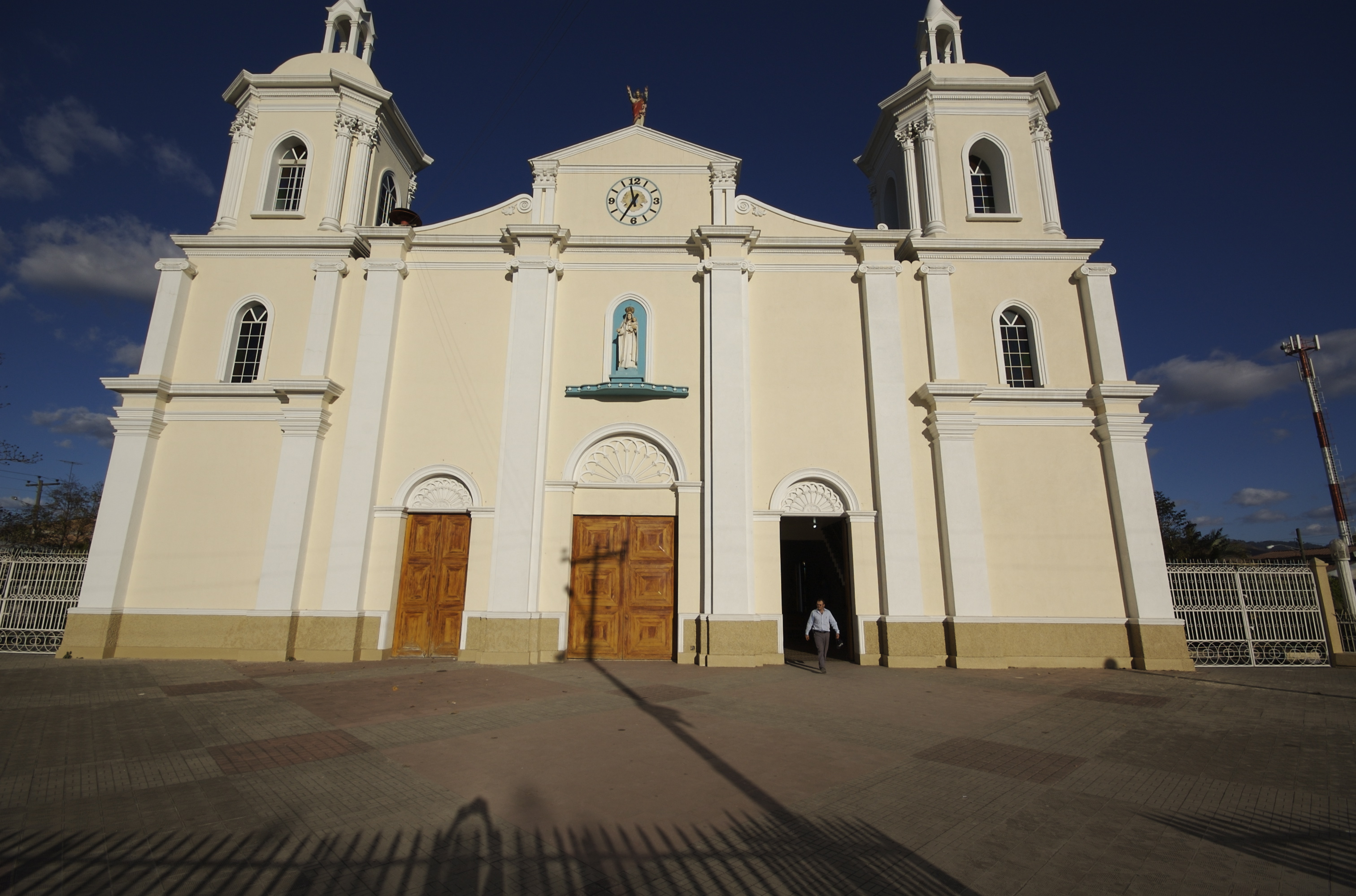
Nuestra Señora del Rosario Cathedral

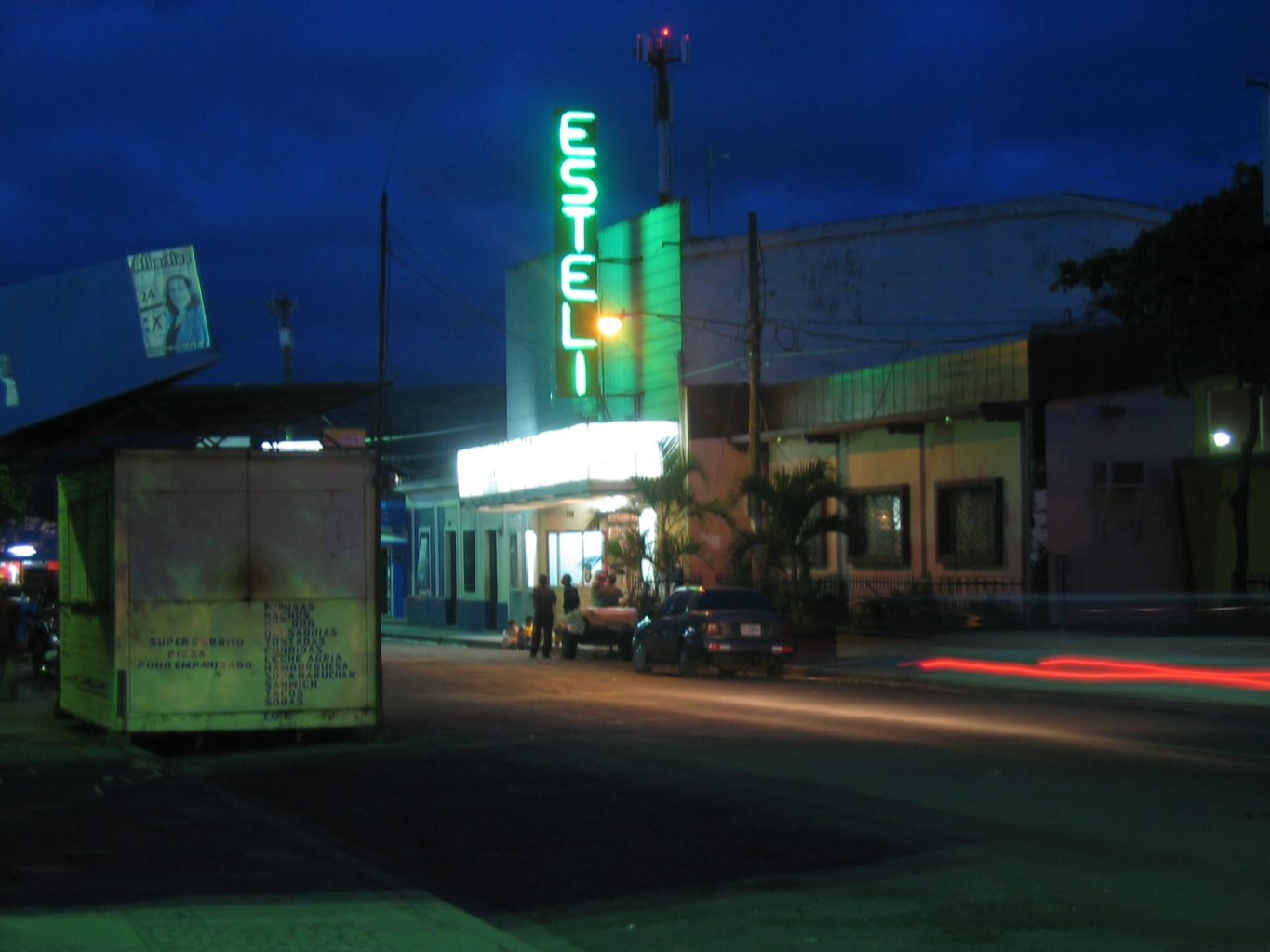
Estelí Cinema (Closed), near the Central Park

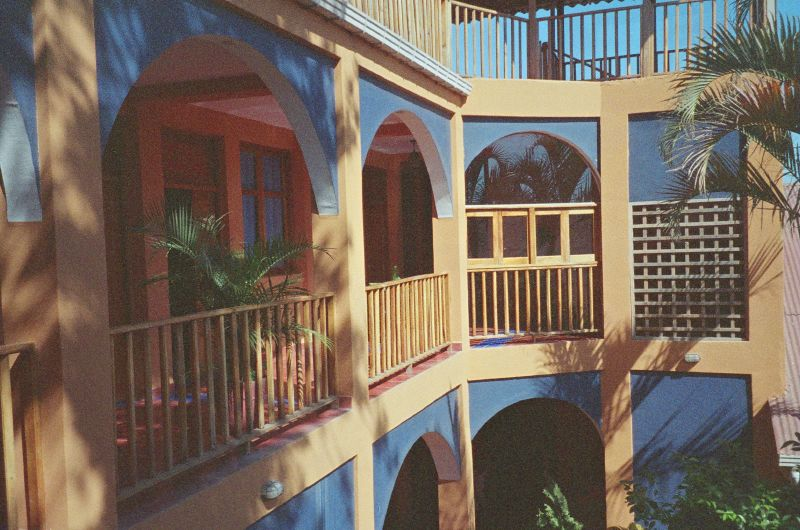
Los Arcos Hotel

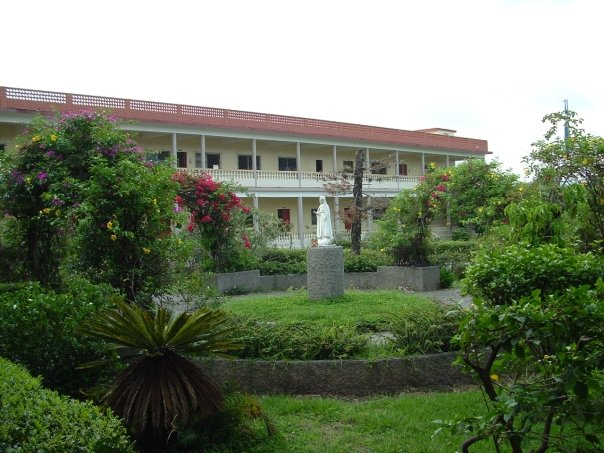
Colegio Nuestra Señora del Rosario

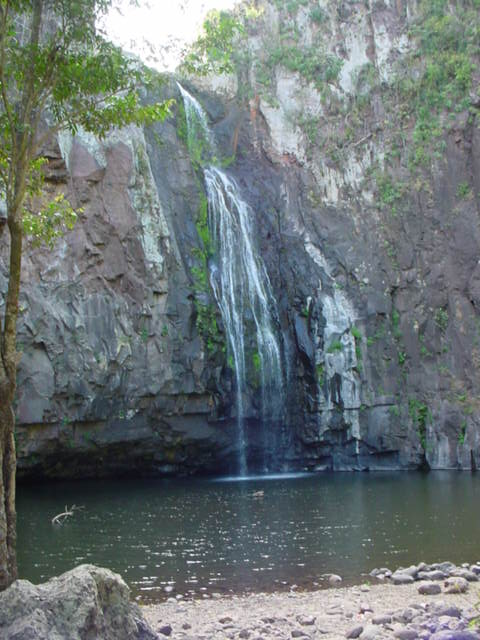
Salto Estanzuela (Estanzuela waterfall) located in the Tisey-Estanzuela Natural Reserve just south of town

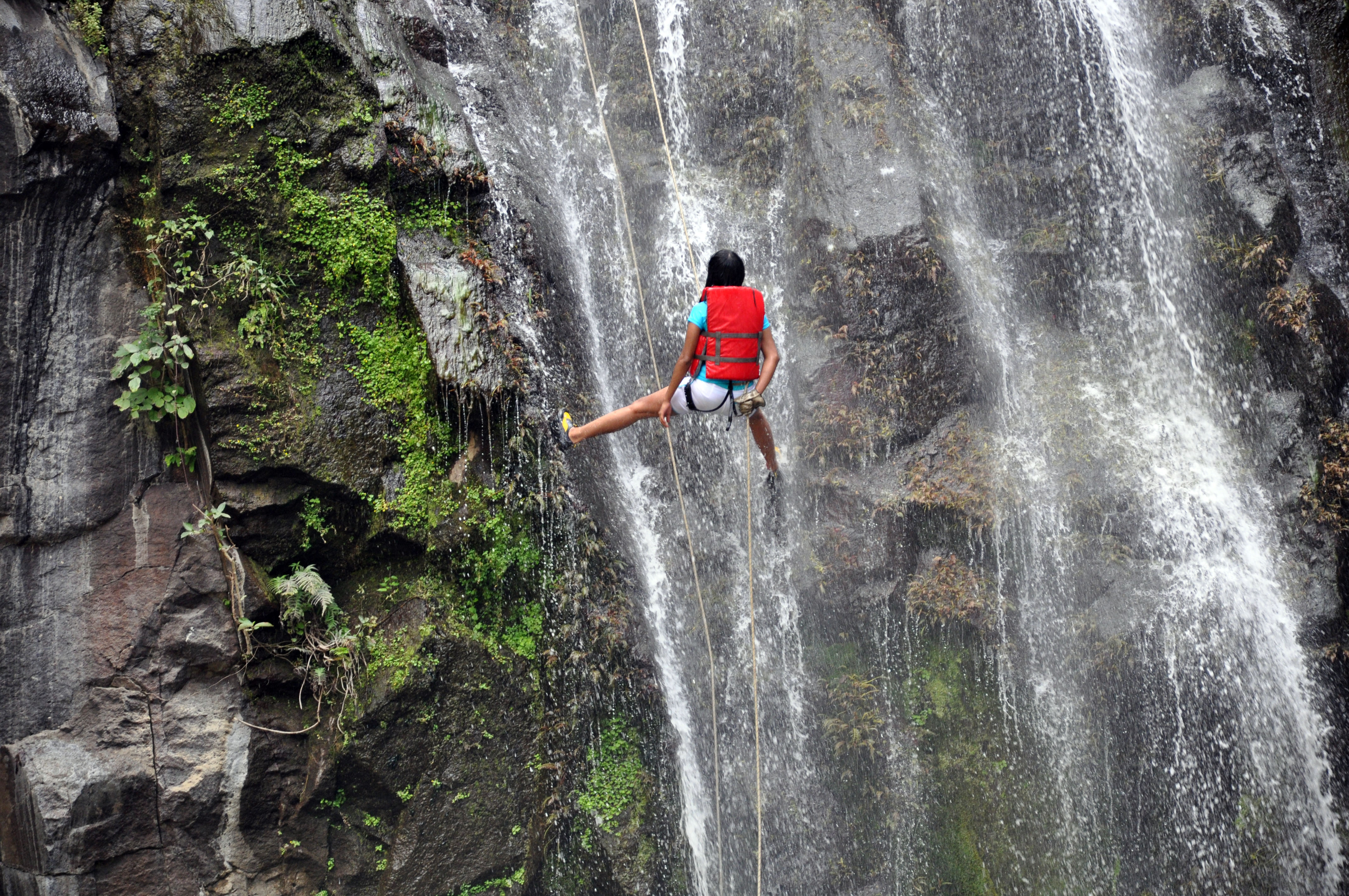
Rappelling down el Salto de la Estanzuela

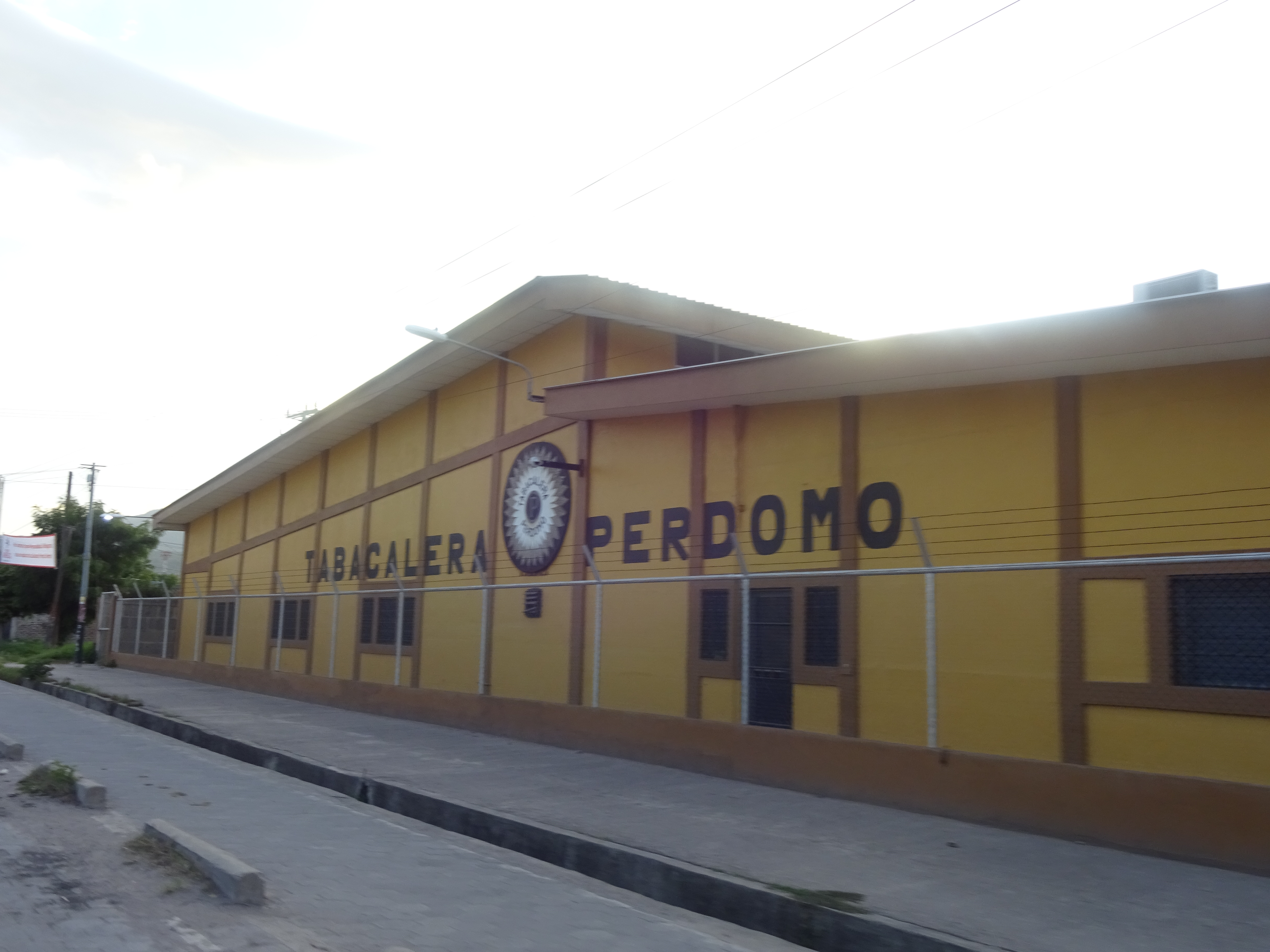
Perdomo Cigar Factory

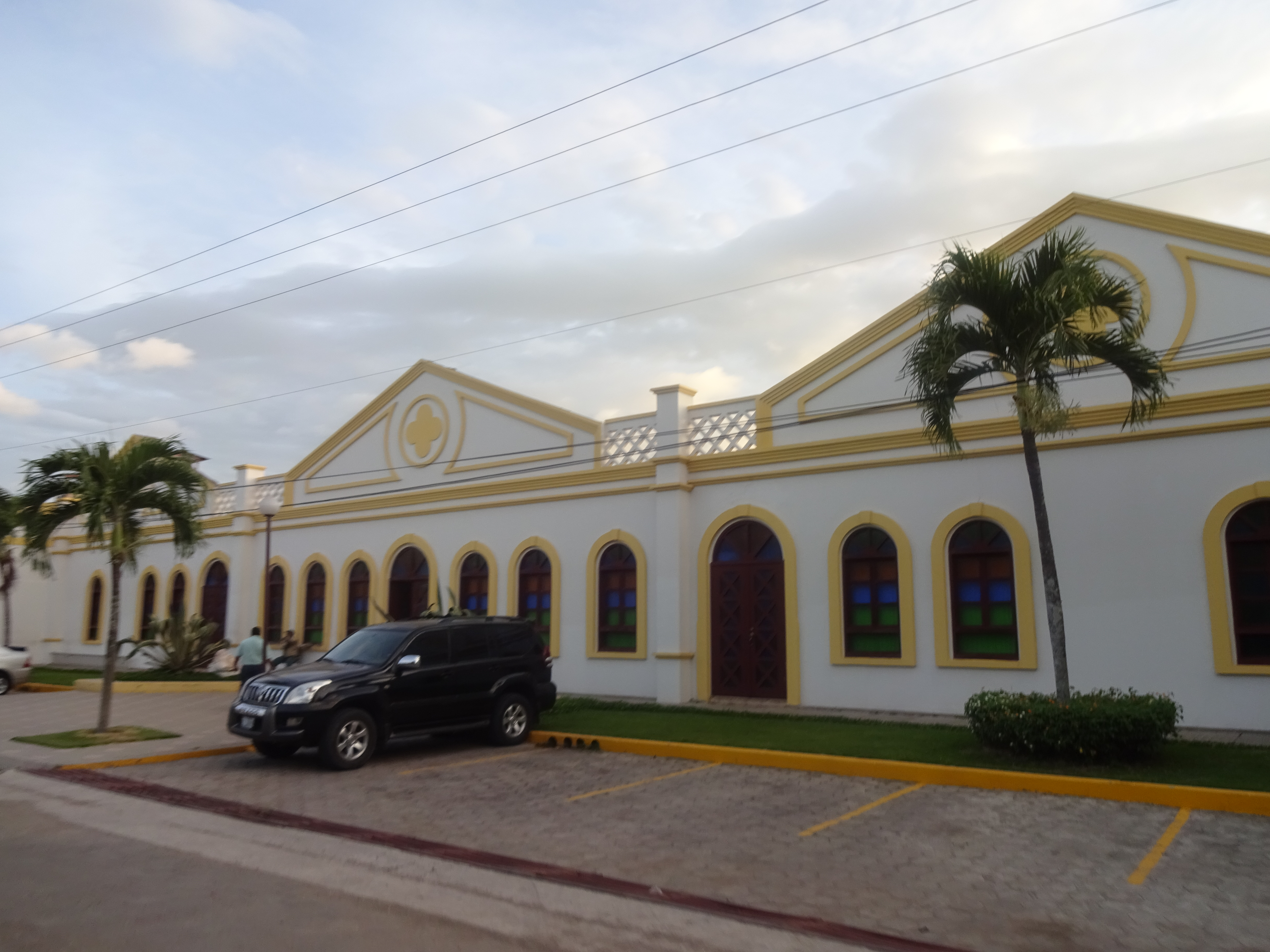
Cigar Factory

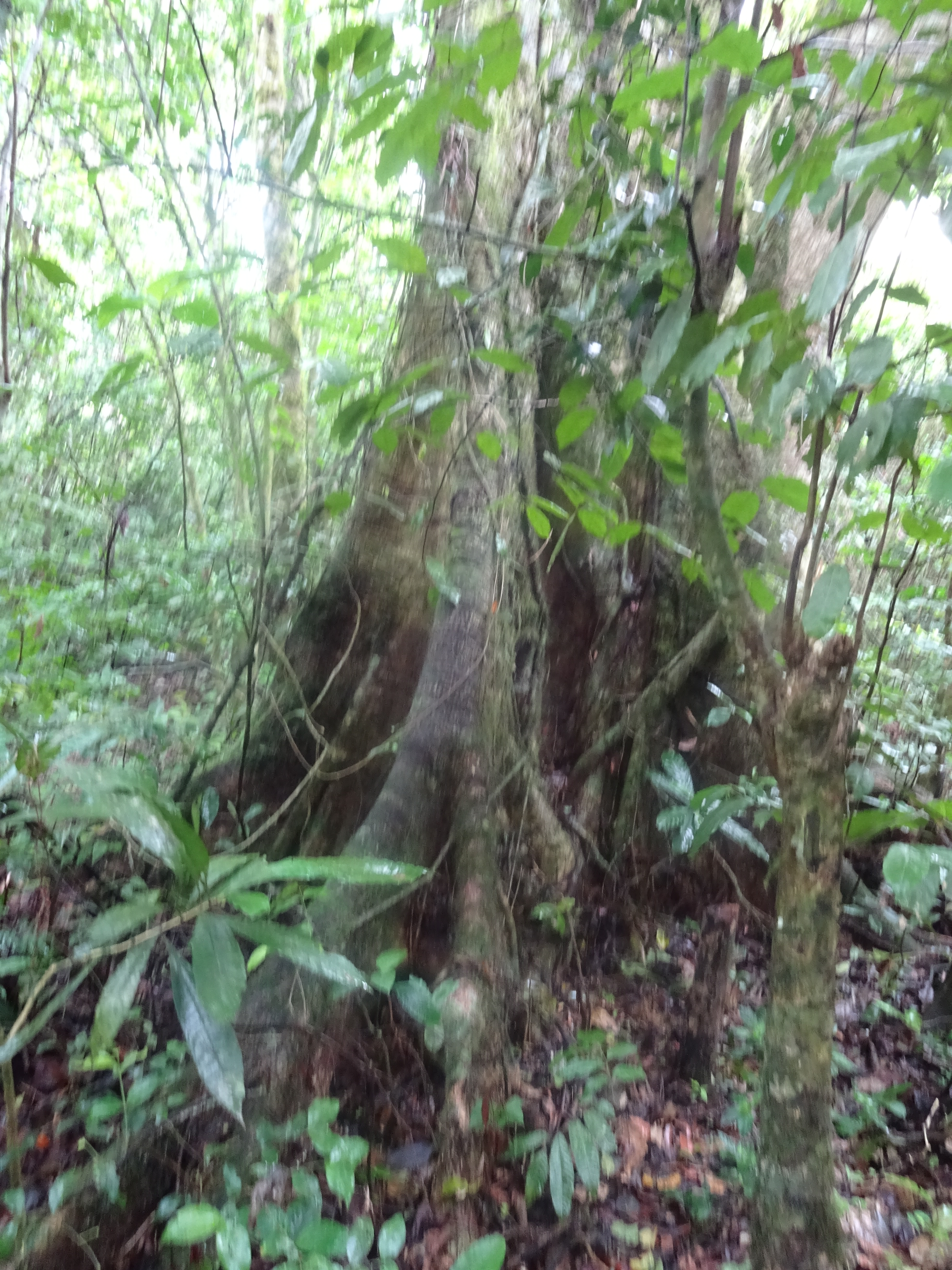
Matapalo Tree in Miraflor Nature Reserve

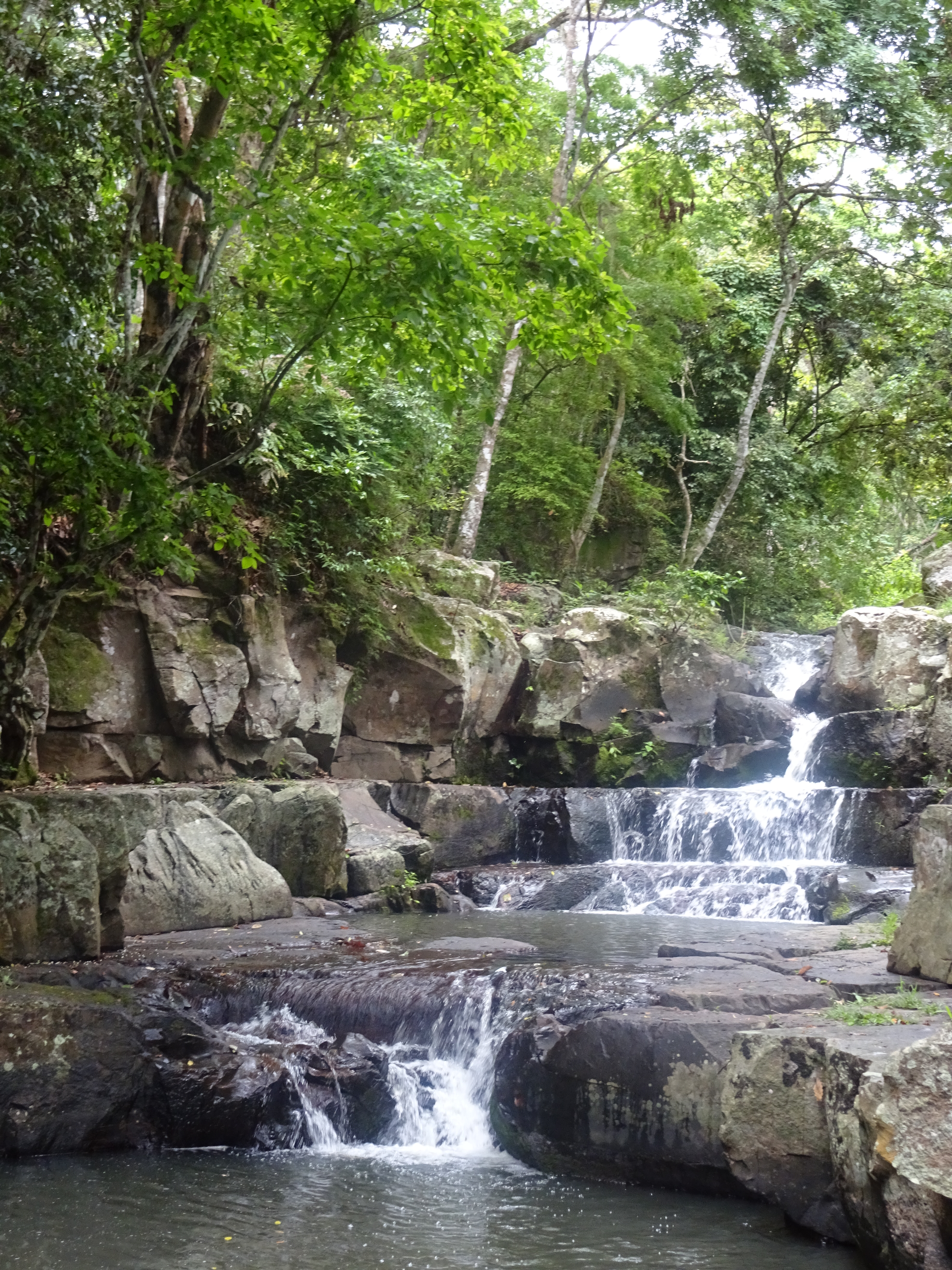
Waterfall in Miraflor Nature Reserve

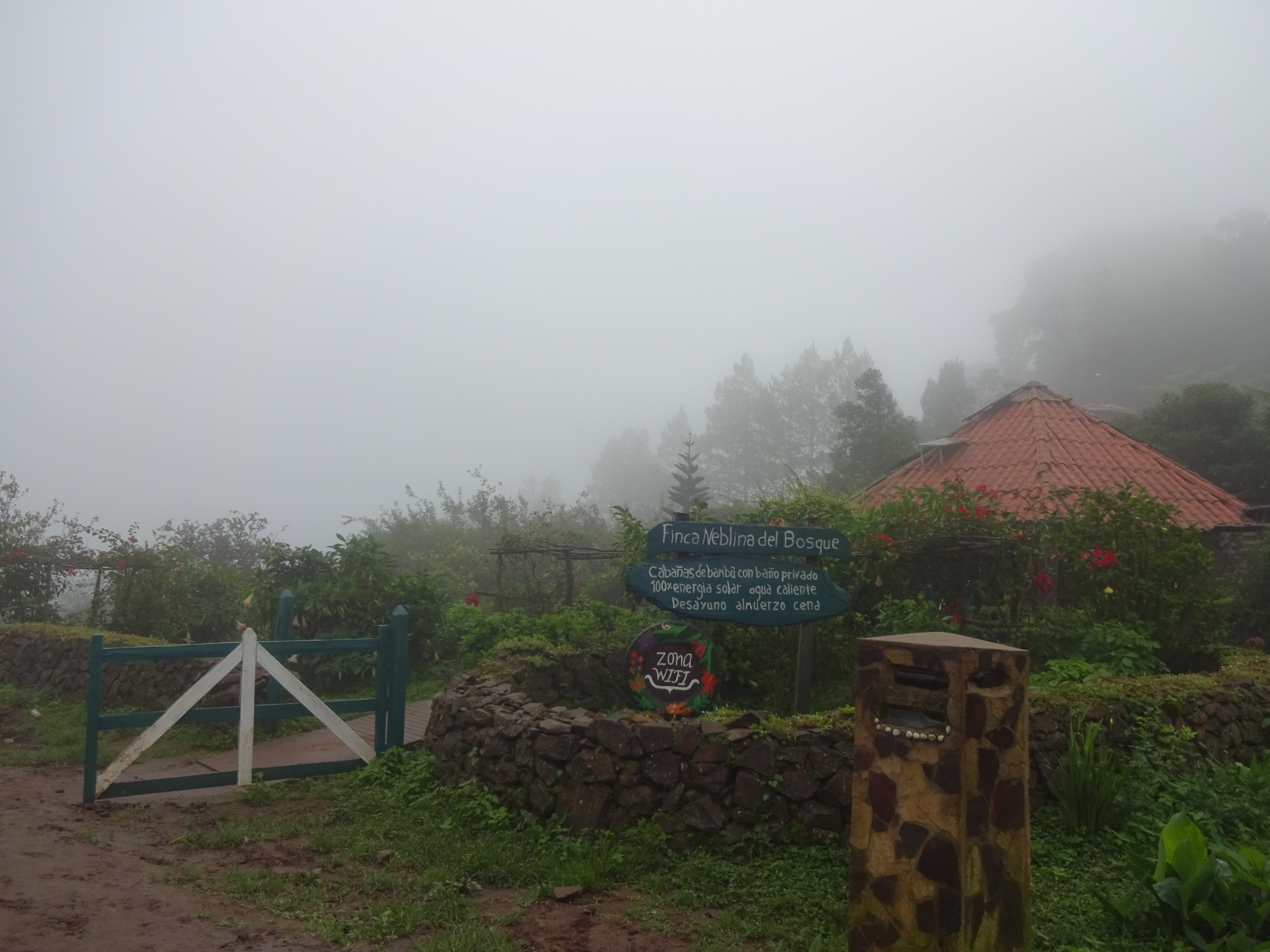
Neblina del Bosque, Miraflor Nature Reserve
