= Miraflor Natural Reserve =

Nature reserve in Nicaragua

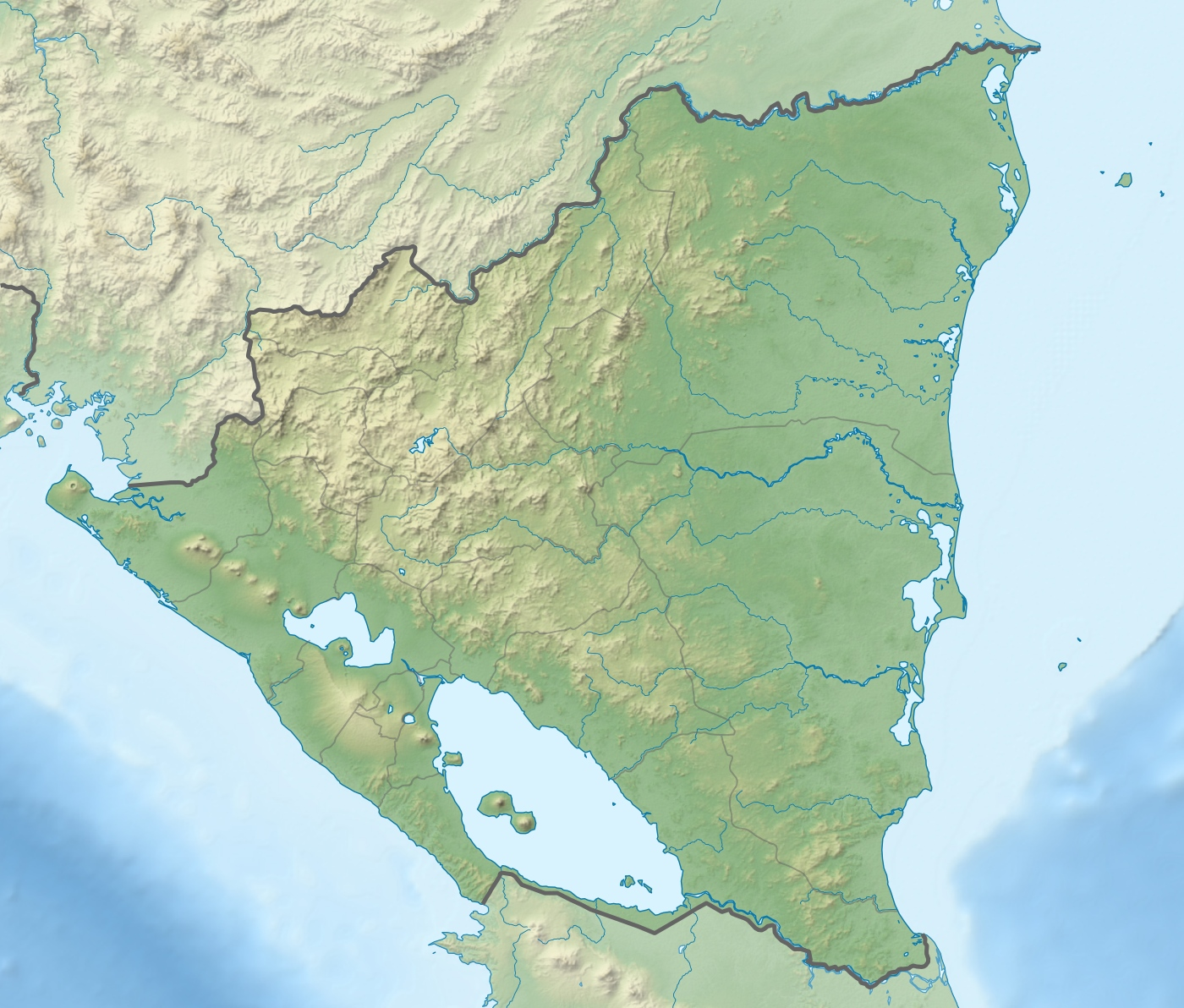
- Location within Nicaragua
- Location: Estelí Department, Nicaragua
- Nearest city: Estelí
- Coordinates: 13°13′N 86°17′W
- Area: 206 km^{2} (80 sq mi)
- Established: 1990

Miraflor Natural Reserve is a nature reserve in Nicaragua. It is one of the 78 reserves that are under official protection in the country. It was declared a nature reserve in 1990. It is located 30 km (19 mi) from Estelí, Nicaragua, and spans an area of 206 km^{2} (80 sq mi).

It is a place where farmers grow coffee, one of the region's most valuable ecological products. The reserve is known for its bio-diversity. It is considered one of the richest orchids zones in the world. There are more than 200 identified species of orchids, including Catteleya Skinniri (the national flower of Costa Rica). The orchids grow in different ways, but the most common growth is on the trees. There are also many colorful and unique orchid species growing among the rocks and directly on the ground level. There are 236 species of birds, among which one can observe quetzal, emerald toucanet, three-wattled bellbird (Procnias tricarunculatus), chestnut-headed oropendola (Psarocolius wagleri), and the national bird of Nicaragua, turquoise-browed motmot (guardabarranco, "guardian of the stream").
