= Hyundai Getz =

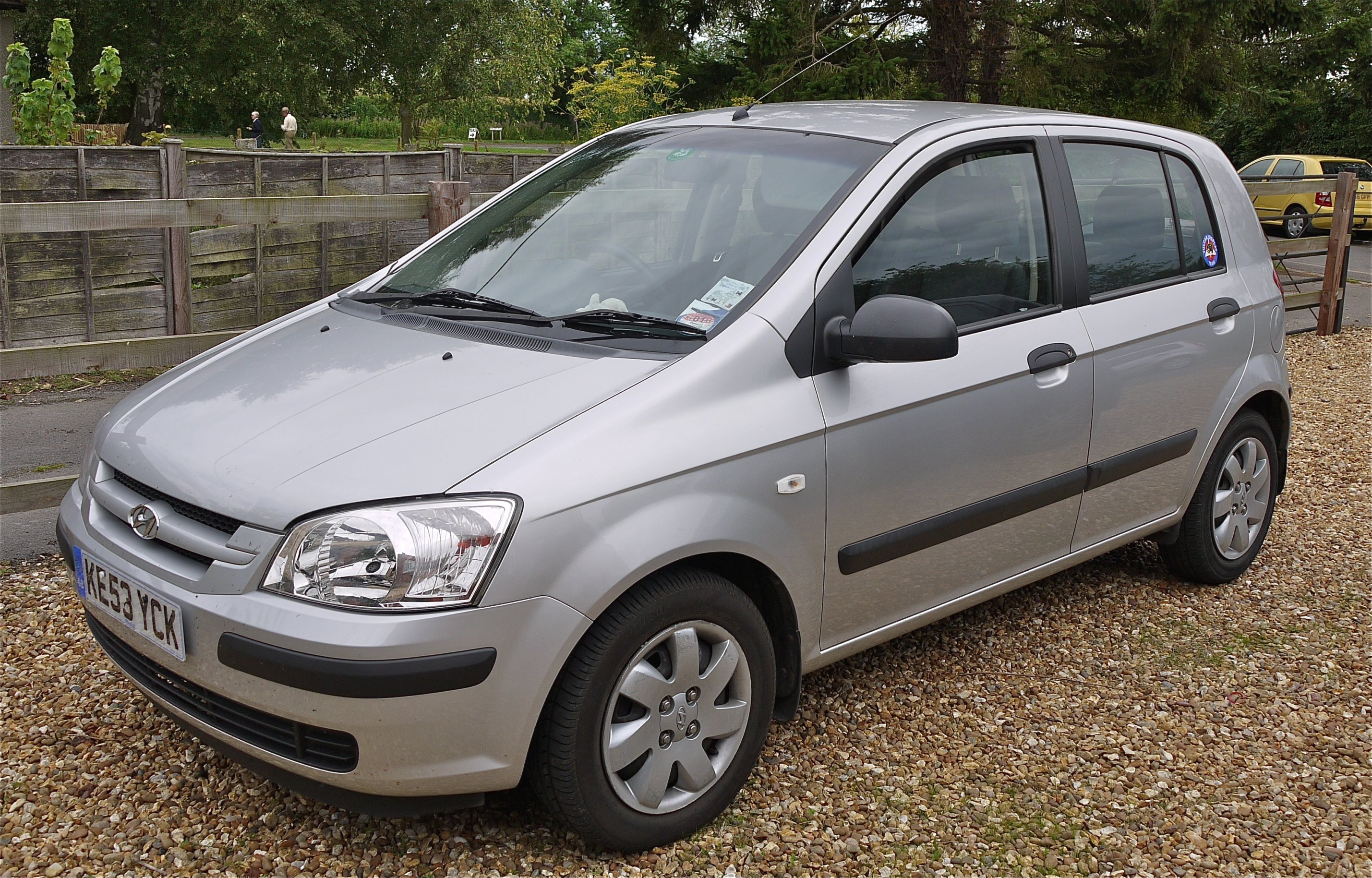
- Pre-facelift Hyundai Getz 5-door (UK)

Overview
- Manufacturer: Hyundai
- Model code: TB
- Also called: Hyundai Click (South Korea); Hyundai TB (Japan); Dodge Brisa (Venezuela); Inokom Getz (Malaysia); Blade Electron (EV, Australia & NZ)
- Production: 2002–2011 (South Korea); 2004–2009 (India)
- Assembly: South Korea: Ulsan; India: Chennai (Hyundai Motor India); Venezuela: Barcelona (MMC Automotriz); Malaysia: Kulim (Inokom); Taiwan: Taipei (SYM Motors); Egypt: Cairo (Ghabbour Group); Australia: Castlemaine, Victoria, Hornsby, New South Wales (Blade Electric Vehicles)

Body and chassis
- Class: Supermini
- Body style: 3-door hatchback; 5-door hatchback
- Layout: Front-engine, front-wheel-drive
- Platform: Hyundai-Kia TB
- Related: Hyundai Atos; Kia Picanto; Hyundai Accent (LC)

Powertrain
- Engine: 1.1 L Epsilon I4 SOHC 12v (petrol); 1.3 L Alpha MPi I4 DOHC 12v (petrol); 1.4 L Alpha II CVVT I4 DOHC 16v (petrol); 1.5 L Alpha II I4 DOHC 12v (petrol); 1.6 L Alpha II I4 DOHC 16v (petrol); 1.5 L D I3 CRDi SOHC 12v (turbo); 1.5 L U CRDi-VGT I4 DOHC 16v (turbo diesel)
- Transmission: 5-speed manual; 4-speed automatic

Dimensions
- Wheelbase: 2,455 mm (96.7 in)
- Length: 3,810 mm (150.0 in) (2002–2005); 3,825 mm (150.6 in) (2005–2011)
- Width: 1,665 mm (65.6 in)
- Height: 1,490 mm (58.7 in)
- Curb weight: 930–1,104 kg (2,050–2,434 lb)

Chronology
- Successor: Hyundai i20 Hyundai Accent WIT

The Hyundai Getz is a supermini manufactured and marketed by Hyundai from 2002 to 2011 in three- and five-door hatchback body styles over a single generation — and marketed globally except in the United States, Canada and China.

The Getz was marketed as the Hyundai Click in South Korea, Hyundai Getz Prime in India, Hyundai TB (for "Think Basic") in Japan, Inokom Getz in Malaysia, or Dodge Brisa in Venezuela.

After the launch of its successors, the i20 (2008) in Europe and Accent RB (2010) in South Korea, the Getz continued to be marketed worldwide, with production ending in 2011.

The name Getz reportedly stands for "achieved by desirability, a link-up of GET and IT, or "GET IT."

== Marketing and production ==
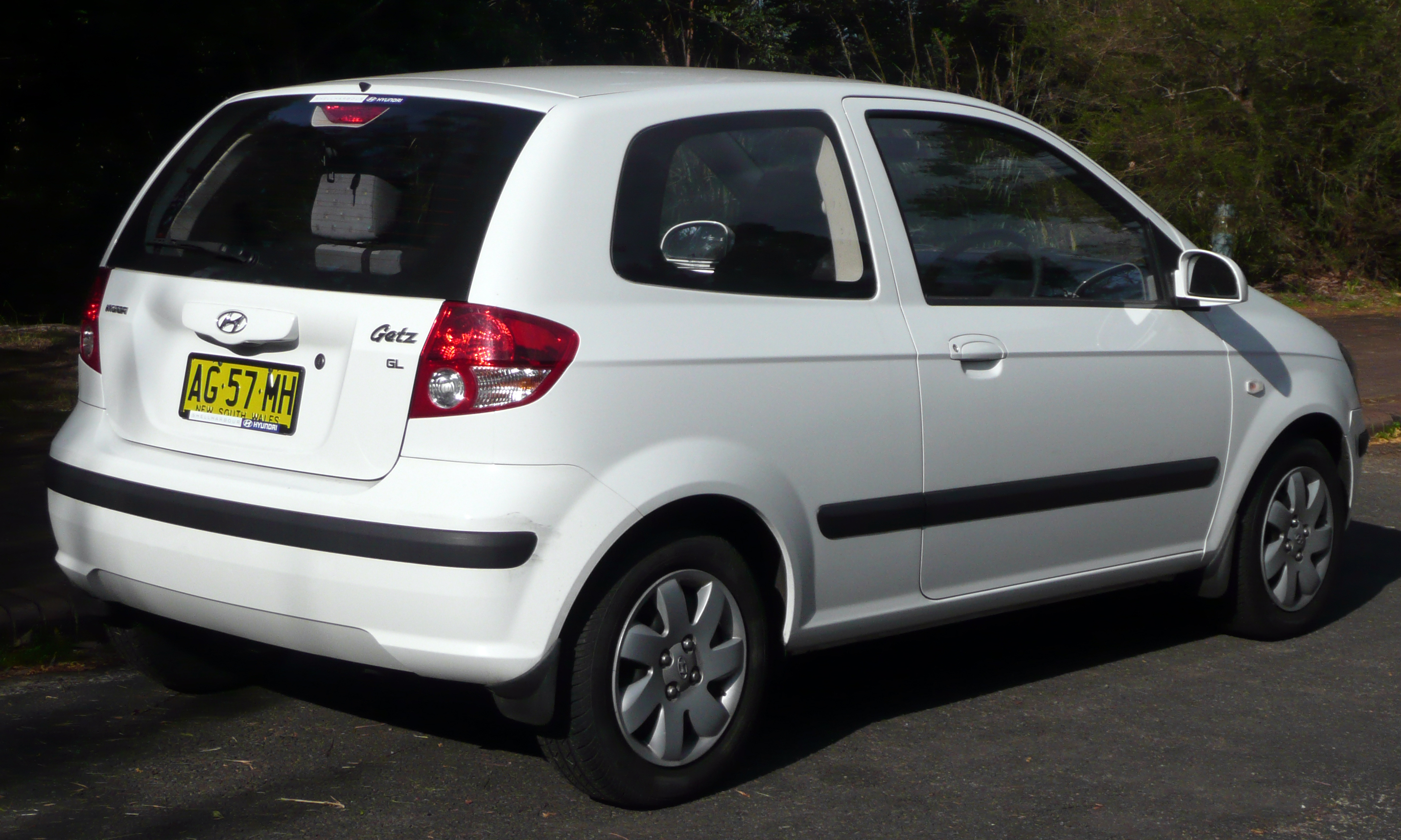
Pre-facelift Hyundai Getz GL 3-door (Australia)

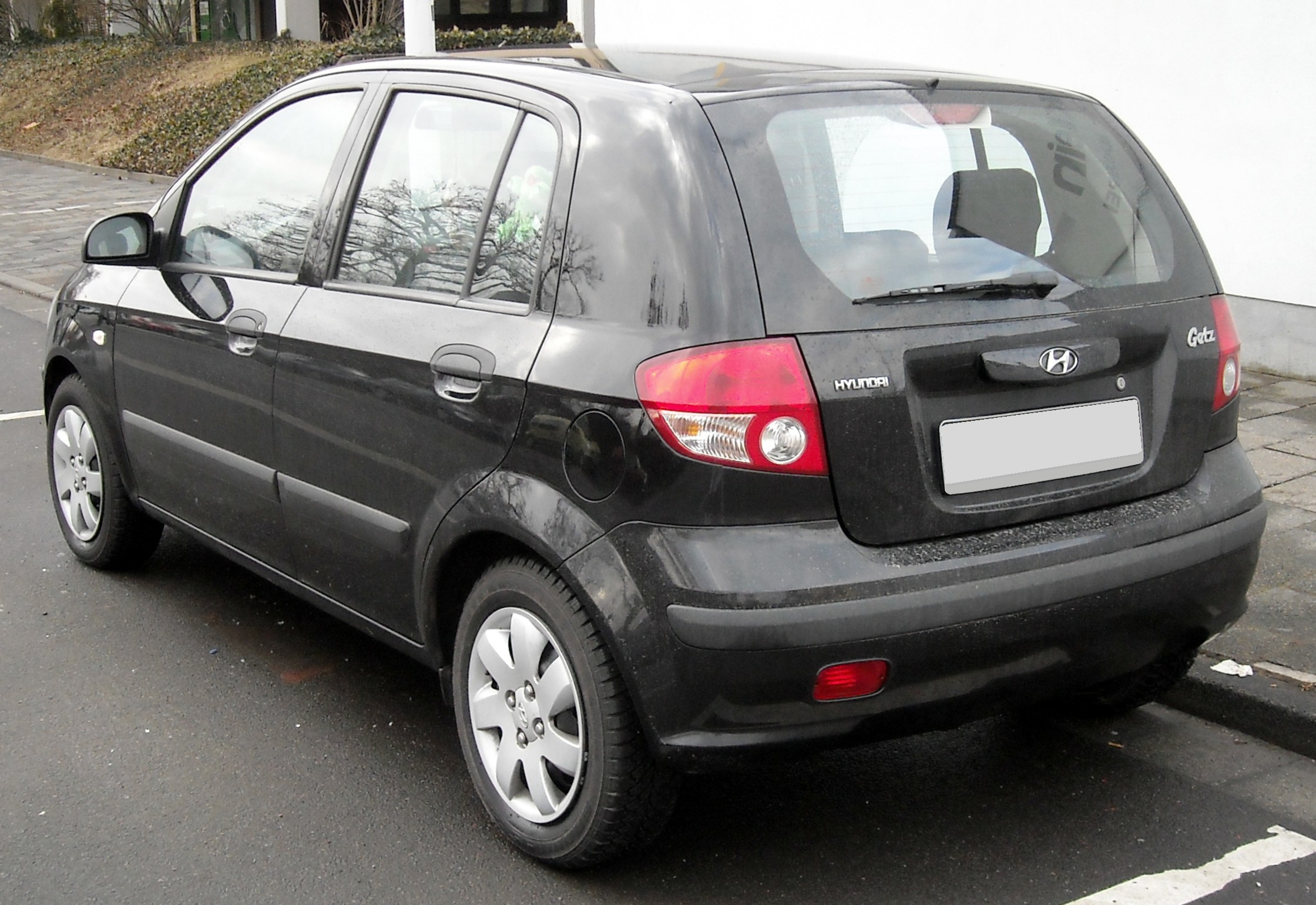
Pre-facelift Hyundai Getz 5-door (Germany)

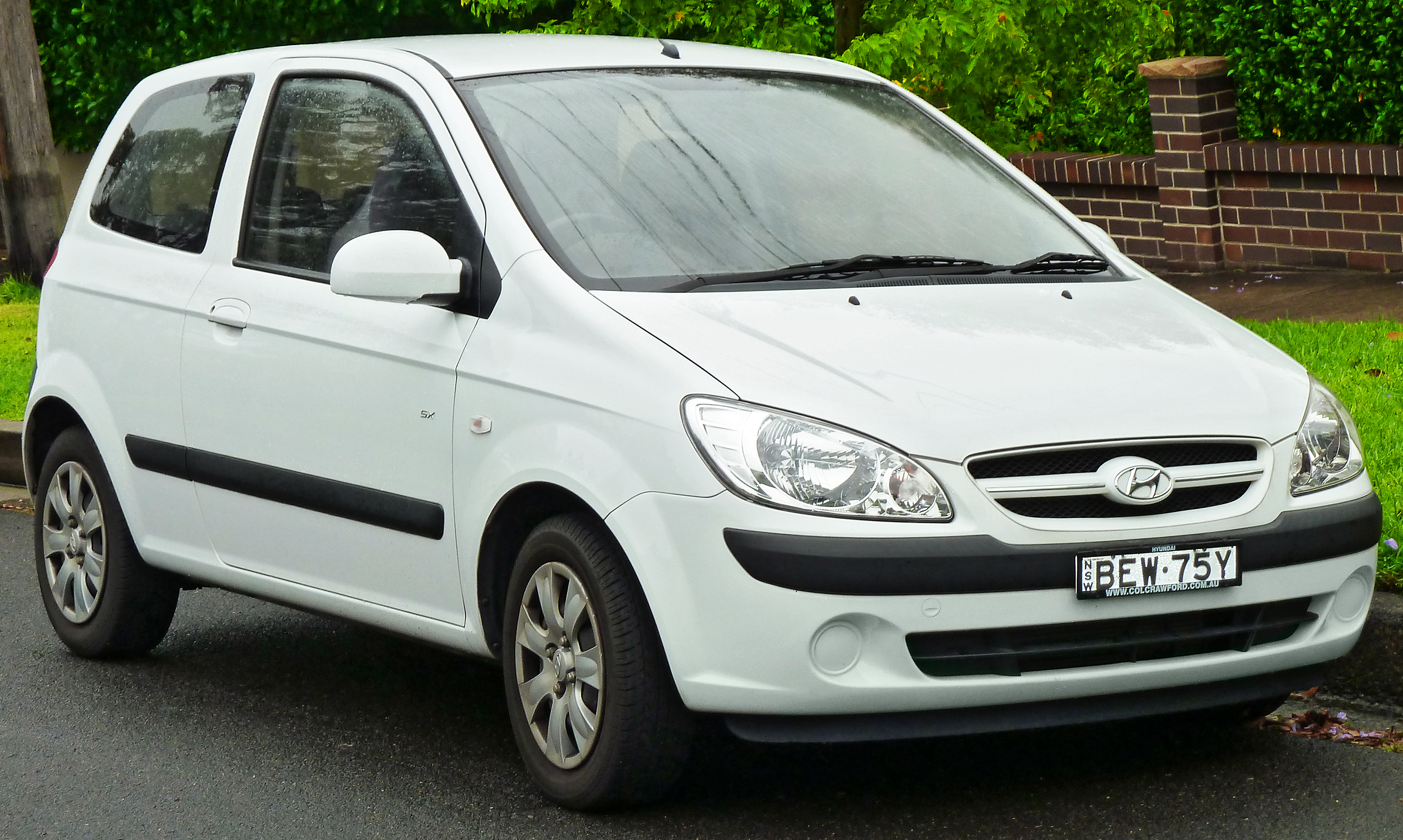
Post-facelift Hyundai Getz SX 3-door (Australia)

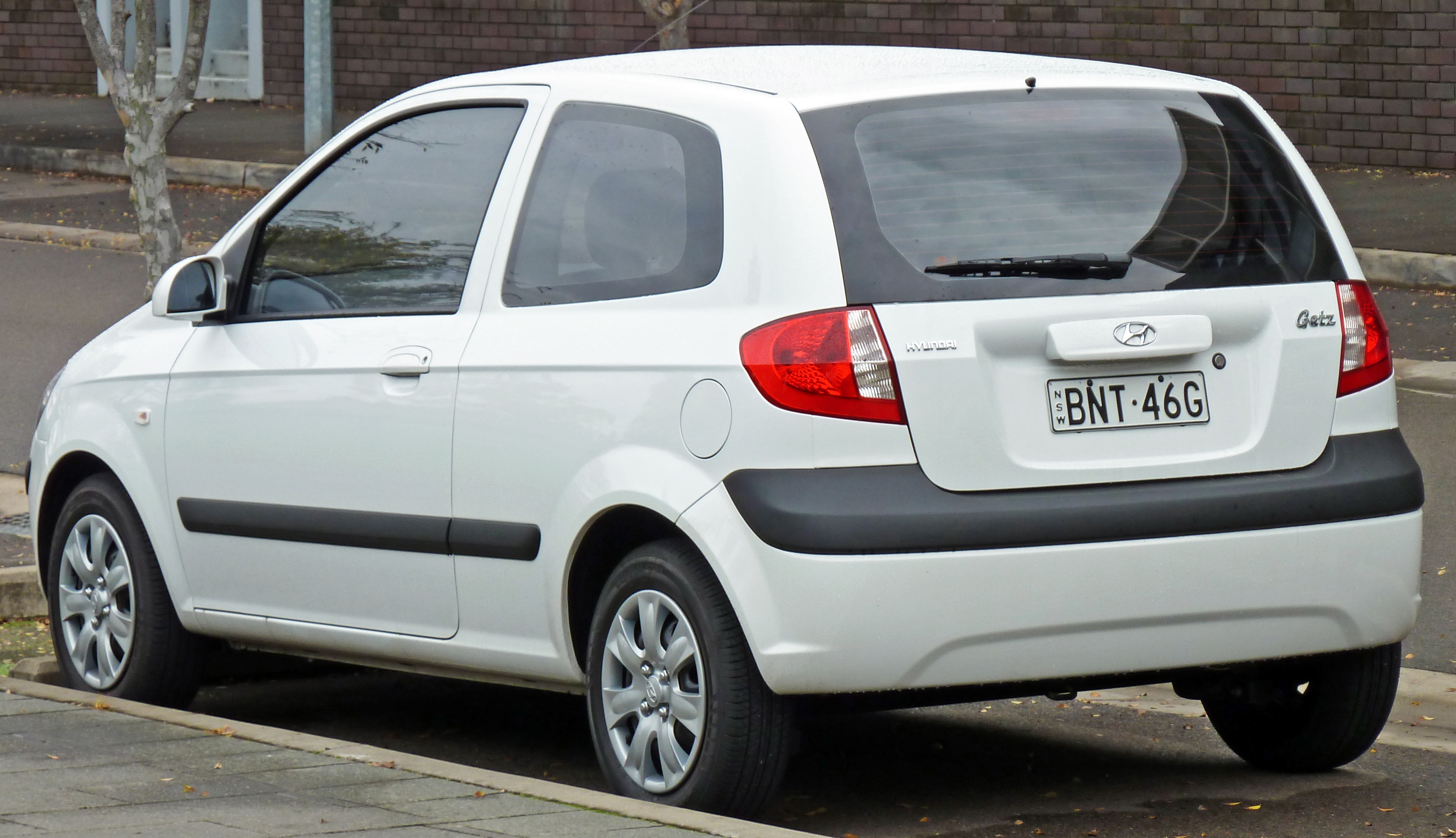
Post-facelift Hyundai Getz S 3-door (Australia)

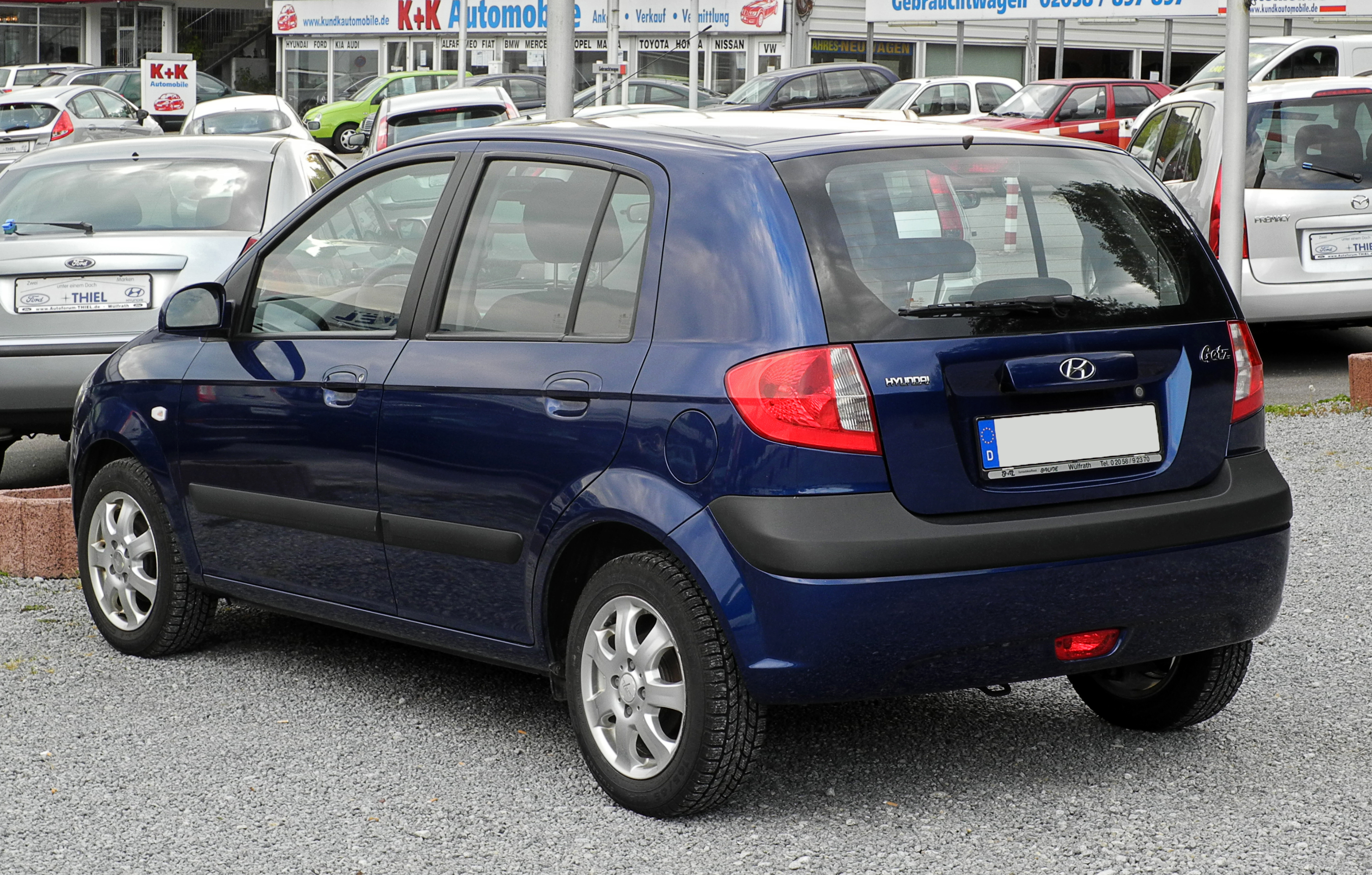
Post-facelift Hyundai Getz 5-door (Germany)

After debuting as a concept at the 2001 Tokyo Motor Show as the Hyundai TB, the Getz premiered globally at the 2002 Geneva Motor Show. It was designed at Hyundai's European engineering center in Frankfurt, Germany, and was released in three- and five-door hatchback body styles.

The Getz was manufactured at the factory in Ulsan, South Korea, between 2002 and 2011, and at the Hyundai Motor India factory in Chennai, India, between 2004 and 2009. It was also assembled for the local markets in Barcelona, Venezuela (MMC Automotriz), in Kulim, Malaysia (Inokom) and in Taipei, Taiwan (SYM Motors).

=== Facelift ===
In the autumn of 2005, the facelifted Getz debuted at the Frankfurt Motor Show with revised front and rear styling, rounded headlights, redesigned grille, an updated 1.5-litre diesel engine (in Europe), a new 1.4-litre petrol engine, upgraded dash and interior fascia and trim.

In the United Kingdom, air conditioning and side airbags were fitted to the CDX as standard equipment.

The facelifted model was not offered in Venezuela (where it marketed as the Dodge Brisa), the local division of Hyundai continuing to sell the pre-2005 model.

=== Regional variants ===
In Venezuela, the Hyundai Getz was assembled locally featuring its 1.6 Litre petrol engine, mated to a 5-speed manual or 4-speed automatic transmission. Also the Getz was badge-engineered as the Dodge Brisa in its 1.3-litre, 4-speed manual transmission configuration. This new model replaced the Accent-based Brisa that debuted in that market in April 2002. In recent years, Hyundai Getz where factory equipped with a CNG kit, allowing dual fuel use of petrol or natural gas. Assembly of the Getz ended in 2014 in Venezuela.

In Malaysia, the Getz was locally assembled as the Inokom Getz. The model offers both manual and automatic transmission with a single 1.4-litre petrol engine option. In the last quarter of 2009, Inokom launched a limited edition Getz SE, which featured leather interior, sporty body kit and grille and side mirrors with indicators. Only 300 units of this variant were produced.

=== Electric version ===
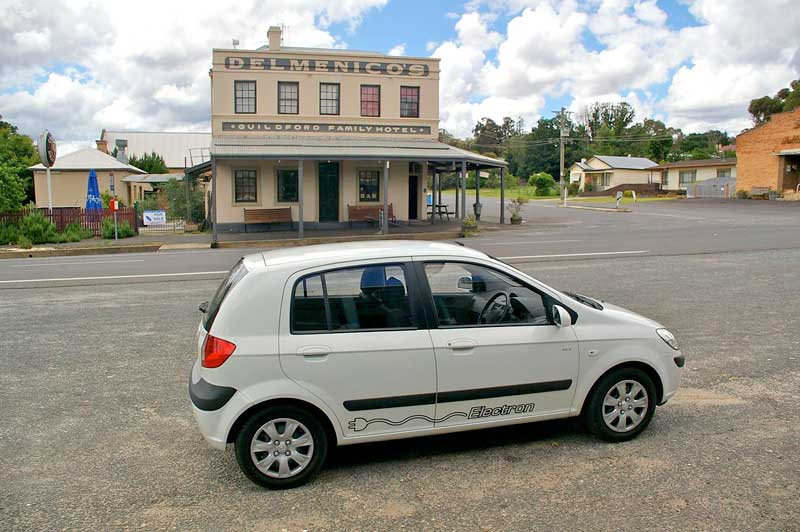
A Blade Electron in Victoria, Australia.

Between 2008 and 2014, Australian company Blade Electric Vehicles sold a fully electric conversion of the Getz called the Blade Electron. Built in Victoria, it was the first commercially available electric car in Australia and retailed for AU$52,000. In New Zealand, the vehicle was distributed at Hyundai dealerships

The first generation Blade Electron model had a top speed of 120 km/h (75 mph) and a range of 120 kilometres (75 mi) on a full charge. Blade Electric Vehicles had an agreement with Hyundai to honor the warranty on original components that were not modified during the conversion process. Around 50 vehicles were produced, and four were still believed to be in operation as of 2019.

== Engines and equipment ==
=== Engines ===
At launch there were three petrol engines available, a 1.1-litre, a 1.3-litre and a 1.5-litre, and one diesel option, a 1.5-litre three-cylinder unit, licensed from VM Motori. When the Getz was introduced to the market in Australia it was brought out with only the 1.5l petrol G4EC engine. After the facelift in 2005, a new 1.4-litre petrol engine replaced the 1.3-litre unit, and a new 1.5-litre diesel with variable geometry turbocharger and two power output levels, was introduced in place of the three-cylinder option. The Diesel engines never made it to Australia. But the introduction of the 1.4 L DOHC and the 1.6 L DOHC replaced the 1.5 L motor. The 1.4 L Engine though very efficient and reliable was no power plant when it came to using the a/c whilst climbing a hill. Especially in the automatic transmission However, the availability of engine options varied depending on market.

There were four-speed automatic transmission options, with overdrive and torque converter, for the 1.3-litre and 1.6-litre petrol versions, and after the facelift also for the 1.4-litre, and five-speed manual options for all engines.

Model	Year model	Engine	Cylinder volume	Power	Torque	Fuel system
1.1	2003–2005	4-cyl Straight engine SOHC 12V	1086 cc	62 PS (46 kW; 61 hp)	94 N⋅m (69 lb⋅ft)	Fuel injection
1.1	2006–2009	4-cyl Straight engine SOHC 12V	1086 cc	67 PS (49 kW; 66 hp)	99 N⋅m (73 lb⋅ft)	Fuel injection
1.3	2003–2005	4-cyl Straight engine SOHC 12V	1341 cc	82 PS (60 kW; 81 hp)	117 N⋅m (86 lb⋅ft)	Fuel injection
1.4	2006–2009	4-cyl Straight engine DOHC 16V	1399 cc	97 PS (71 kW; 96 hp)	126 N⋅m (93 lb⋅ft)	Fuel injection
1.6	2003–2005	4-cyl Straight engine DOHC 16V	1599 cc	105 PS (77 kW; 104 hp)	143 N⋅m (105 lb⋅ft)	Fuel injection
1.6	2006–2009	4-cyl Straight engine DOHC 16V	1599 cc	106 PS (78 kW; 105 hp)	144 N⋅m (106 lb⋅ft)	Fuel injection
1.5 CRDi	2004–2005	3-cyl Straight engine DOHC 12V	1493 cc	80 PS (59 kW; 79 hp)	182 N⋅m (134 lb⋅ft)	Diesel
1.5 CRDi	2006–2009	4-cyl Straight engine DOHC 16V	1493 cc	88 PS (65 kW; 87 hp)	215 N⋅m (159 lb⋅ft)	Turbodiesel
1.5 CRDi	2008–2009	4-cyl Straight engine DOHC 16V	1493 cc	110 PS (81 kW; 108 hp)	235 N⋅m (173 lb⋅ft)	Turbodiesel

=== Trim levels ===
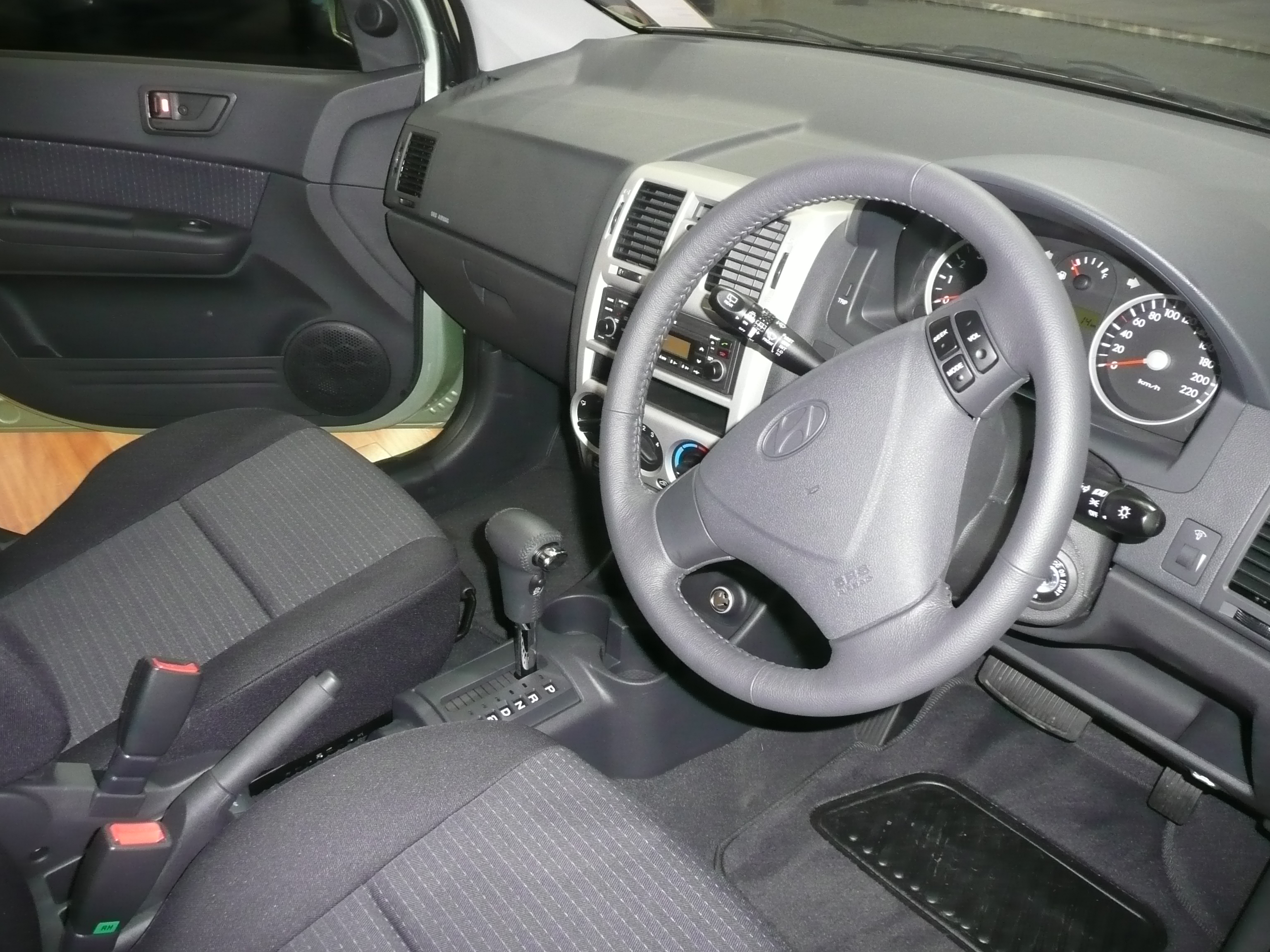
Interior

In the United Kingdom, the trim levels offered were GSI, CDX and Sport, while in New Zealand, they were XD and XE.

In Australia, the trim levels were XL, GL and FX. After the facelift, the XL and GL were dropped, while the FX was replaced by the sporty SXi trim, The rest of the models were referred to as "Getz". Half-way through 2006, the SXi was dropped, leaving just the base Getz with the option of 1.4 or 1.6-litre engines. In early 2008, the Getz 1.4 was named S, and the 1.6 was named SX.

The top level generally included, among other features, front and side airbags, anti-lock braking system (ABS) with electronic brakeforce distribution (EBD), remote central locking with alarm, 14-inch alloy wheels, front fog lights, air conditioning, heated electric door mirrors, electric tilt and slide sunroof, electric front and rear windows, CD player and trip computer. The 1.6-litre version featured 15-inch alloy wheels. As optional features there were leather upholstery, metallic paint or satellite navigation. In Australia, electronic stability control (ESC), traction control (TSC), bluetooth handsfree and MP3 player with USB connectivity were also offered.

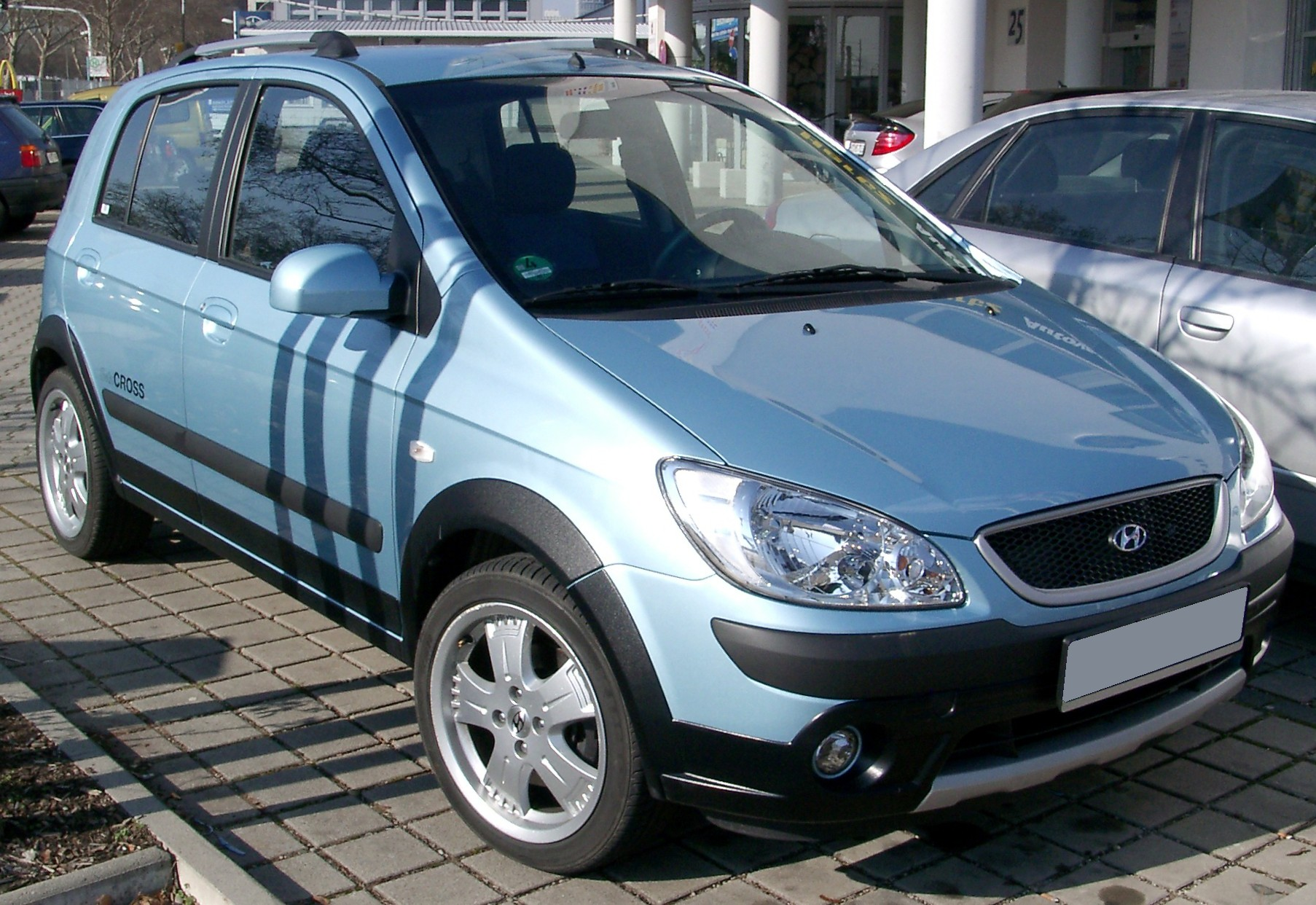

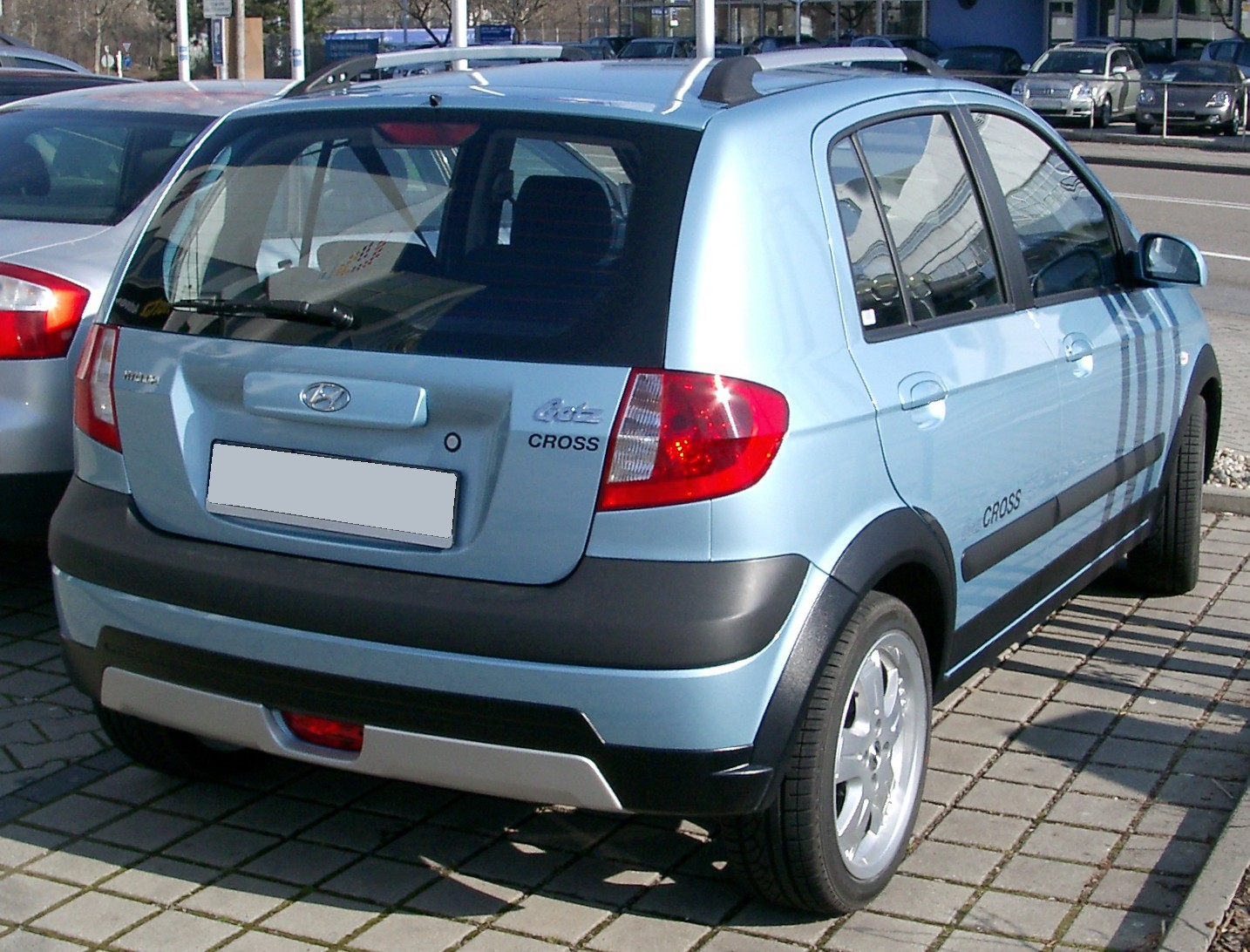
Hyundai Getz Cross

From 2006, a special trim level called the Getz Cross features SUV design elements such as extended wheel arches, roof rack, raised suspension and larger wheels. It was offered with the 1.4-litre and 1.6-litre petrol engines, or with the 1.5-litre diesel engine.

In South Africa the SR sport edition was also introduced in 2010 and was manufactured up until 2012. This edition included full leather interior, bodykit, special SR rims and badges among others.

== Safety ==
=== Euro NCAP ===
In 2004, the Getz was tested by the Euro NCAP, scoring an overall rating of four-stars. The model tested featured driver and passenger airbags, seat-mounted thorax and head airbags, and front seat belts with pre-tensioners and load limiters. It was described as a "reasonably balanced performance" and "generally good" in-car protection for children. It was noted, however, that the design of the car did little to protect pedestrians. An additional point was scored for the seat belt reminder that is provided for the driver.

- Adult occupant:, score 25
- Child occupant:, score 37
- Pedestrian:, score 5

=== ANCAP ===
ANCAP test results Hyundai Getz GL 3 door hatch (2002)
Test	Score
Overall	3 /5 stars
Frontal offset	9.60/16
Side impact	12.28/16
Pole	Not Assessed
Seat belt reminders	0/3
Whiplash protection	Not Assessed
Pedestrian protection	Poor
Electronic stability control	Not Assessed

ANCAP test results Hyundai Getz 5 door hatch with side thorax airbags & driver seat belt reminder (2008)
Test	Score
Overall	4 /5 stars
Frontal offset	10.07/16
Side impact	14.28/16
Pole	Not Assessed
Seat belt reminders	1/3
Whiplash protection	Not Assessed
Pedestrian protection	Poor
Electronic stability control	Optional

ANCAP test results Hyundai Getz New Zealand variants with driver seat belt reminder (2008)
Test	Score
Overall	4 /5 stars
Frontal offset	10.07/16
Side impact	14.28/16
Pole	Not Assessed
Seat belt reminders	1/3
Whiplash protection	Not Assessed
Pedestrian protection	Poor
Electronic stability control	Optional

=== Other ratings ===
In Australia and New Zealand, the 2002–04 Getz was assessed in the 2006 Used Car Safety Ratings (UCSR) as providing "significantly worse than average" protection for its occupants in the event of a crash.

== Awards ==
- Australia's Best Small Car in 2003 and 2005
- Scottish Small Car of the Year award in 2003
- UK What Car? Magazine Budget Car of the Year in 2003
- Budget car champion on the UK motoring programme Fifth Gear in 2003
- Denmark's Best Seller of 2003 award
- Portuguese Car of the Year for 2004 (1.5 CRDI)

== Replacement ==
In late 2008, the i20 was introduced, replacing the Getz in most markets. In Europe, the Getz co-existed with the i20 until it was completely phased out in 2011. The Getz continued to be sold in the Australian market until December 2010. In India, the car was discontinued due to falling demand as compared to the warm response received by the i20 and the introduction of the new Euro 4 emission norms from May 2010.

In mid-2011, the Click was replaced in the South Korean market by the Hyundai Accent WIT. In Japan, where it was known as the TB, the car was discontinued shortly before Hyundai officially announced the departure of its passenger car division from the market in late-2009. Countries that do not offer the i20 or Accent hatchback have designated the i10 as the Getz's replacement. In addition, Hyundai owned subsidiary, Kia and its Picanto series has also replaced the Getz in the small car market.

Hyundai produced 1,390,084 variants of the Getz between 2002 and 2011. 153,000 were sold in Australia.

== Sales by calendar year ==
Year	Europe
2002	16,249
2003	76,549
2004	123,701
2005	113,770
2006	82,634
2007	67,242
2008	55,214
2009	16,822
2010	1,027

The Getz was Hyundai's best-selling vehicle in Europe from 2003 to 2008.
