= Dodge Brisa =

The Dodge Brisa is a car model produced by the Venezuelan manufacturer MMC Automotriz, between 2002 and 2009. It had two generations and they were rebadged versions of two different Hyundai models, under the strategic alliance between DaimlerChrysler and the South Korean manufacturer.

== Overview ==
=== First generation ===
The first generation was introduced in 2002 in the Venezuelan market as a badge-engineered Hyundai Accent X3. The car was offered in saloon and coupé body styles. In consideration of a lack of sales, the production of the coupé version was discontinued in 2004. The saloon was in the model lineup as a three and a five-door model.

It was powered by a four-cylinder gasoline engine with a displacement of 1,341 cc, 12 valves and a maximum power of 82 hp. The curb weight of the vehicles was between 942 and 1410 kg.

=== Second generation ===
The second generation was introduced in 2006, after poor sales of the first generation model. This generation was based on the Hyundai Getz. With the modern design, it mainly appealed to the young clientele. It was powered by a four-cylinder gasoline engine with a displacement of 1.3 litres and a maximum power of 81.5 hp. The curb weight was at 992 kg. As of summer 2009, the Dodge Brisa has been discontinued without a successor.

== Gallery ==
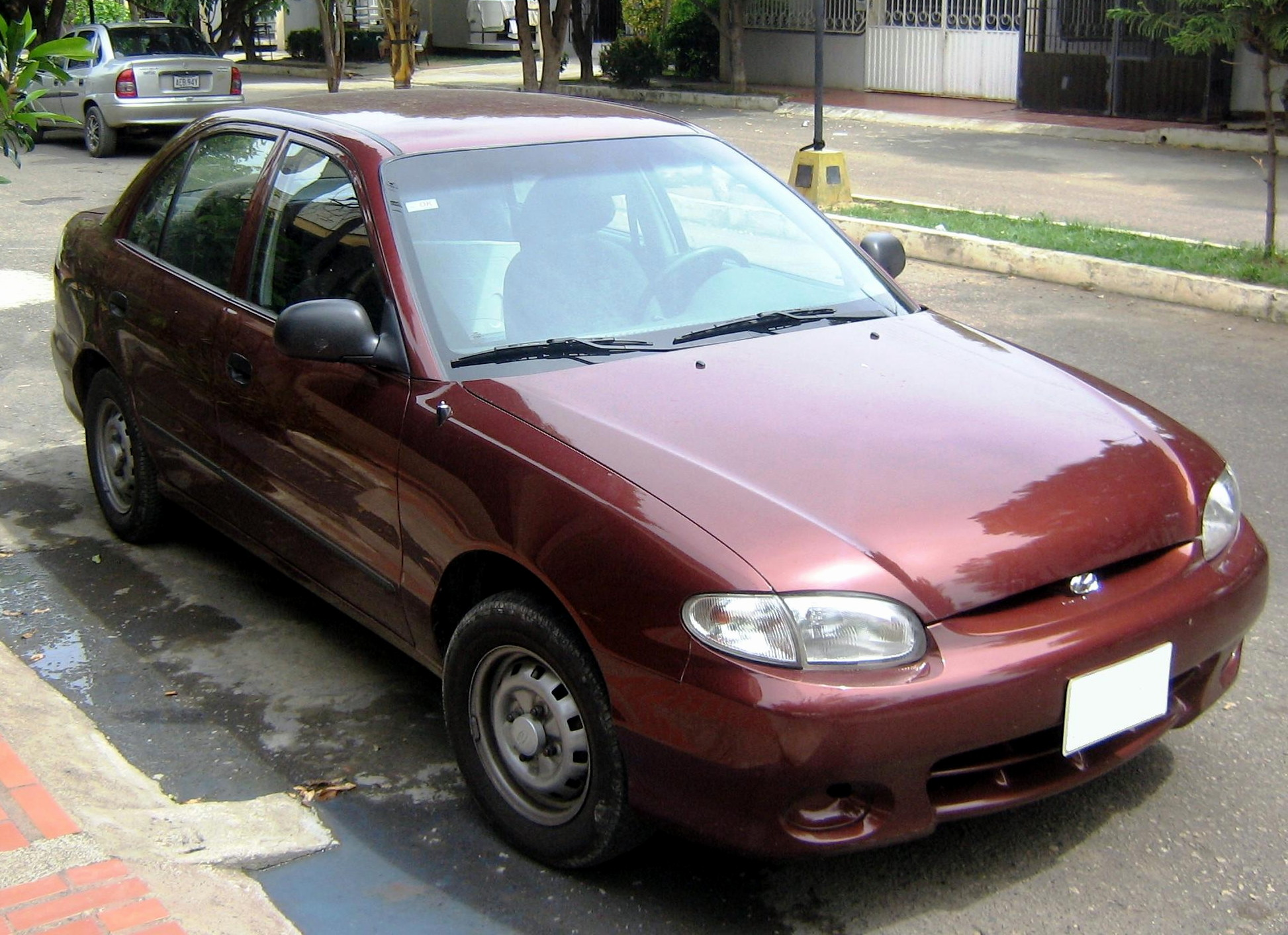
Dodge Brisa first generation (2002–2006)

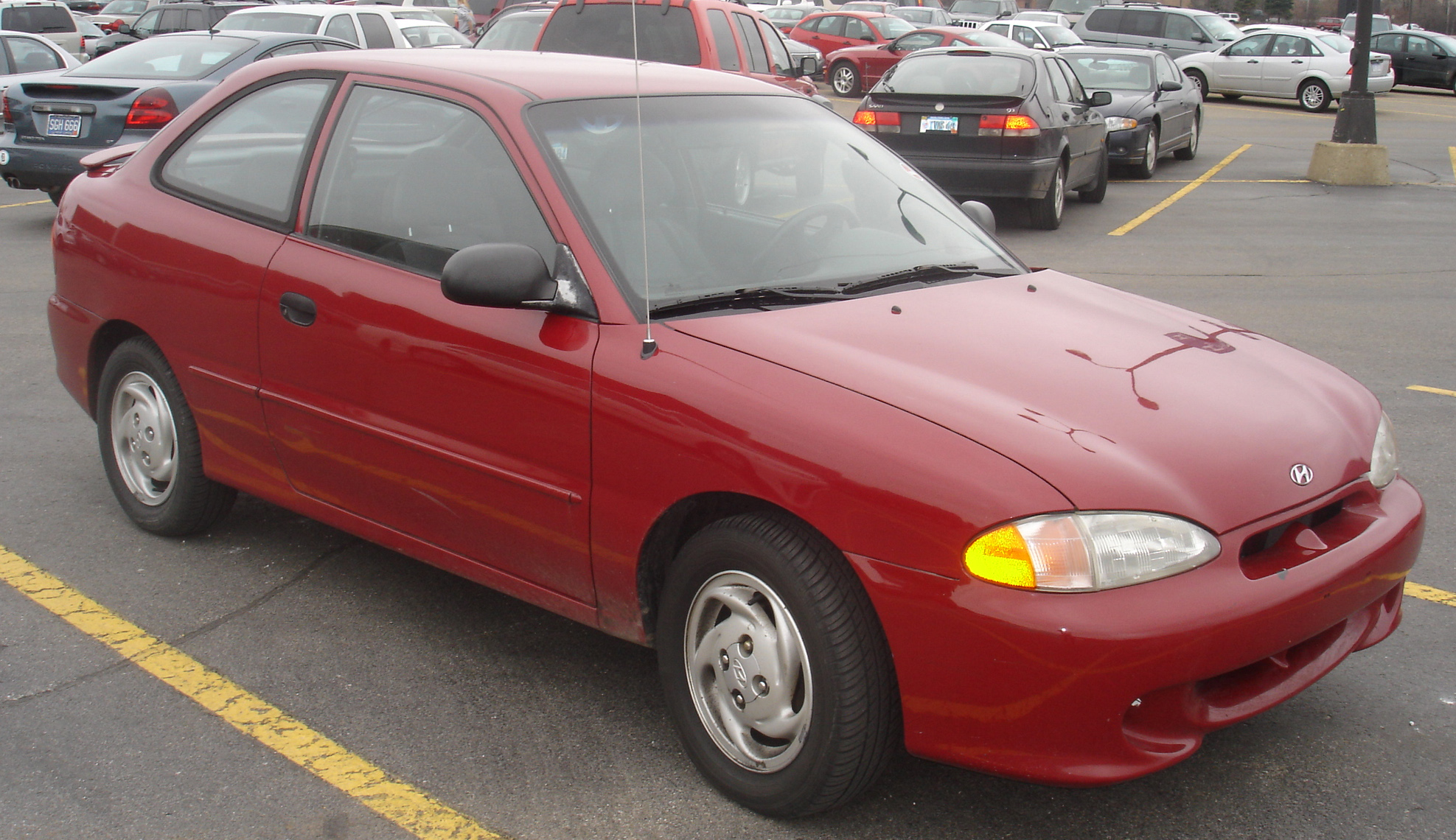
Dodge Brisa Coupé first generation (2002–2004)

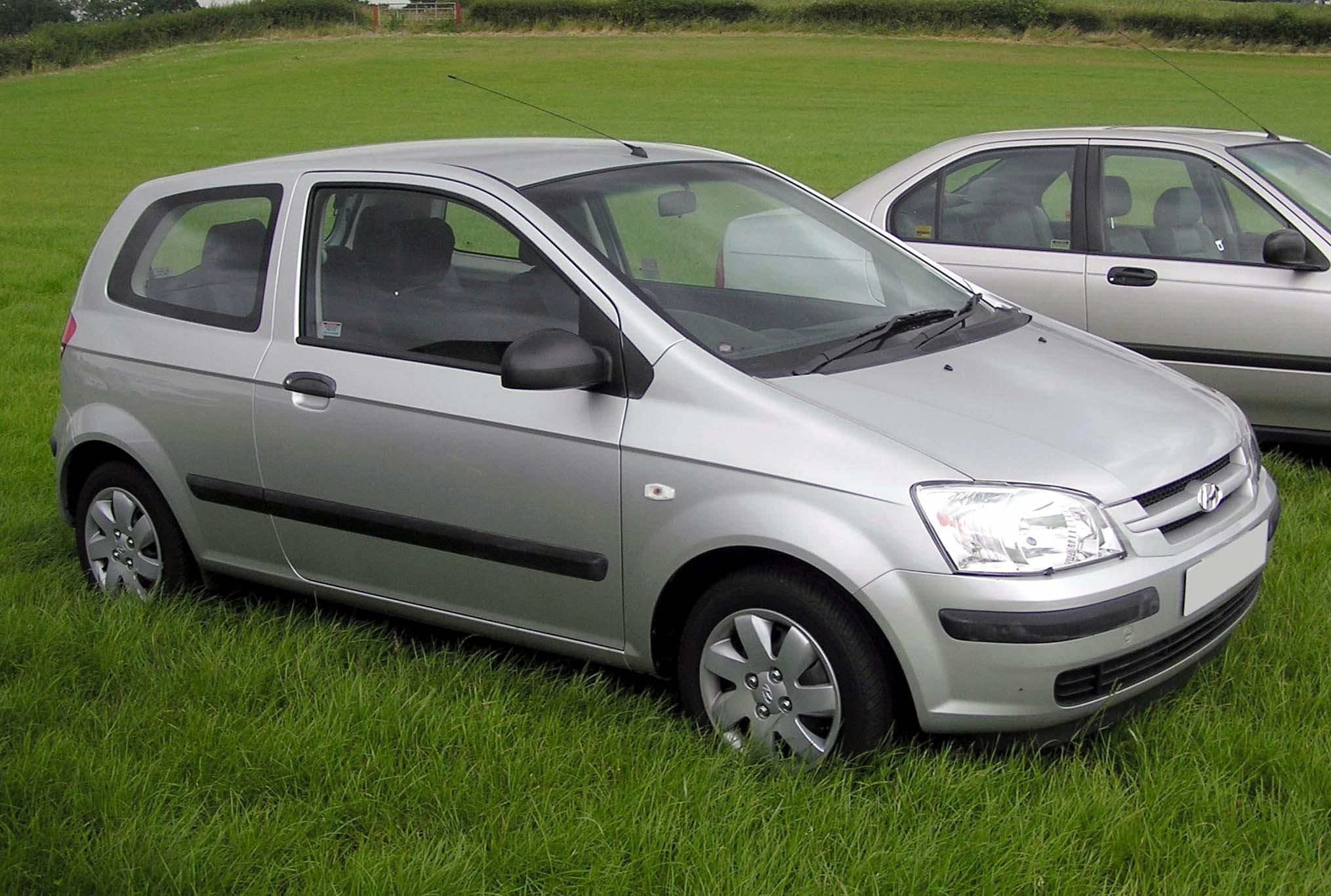
Dodge Brisa second generation (2006–2009)
