= Brisas Group =

Mexican hotel chain

Brisas Group is a Mexican hotel chain that owns the Nizuc Resort in addition to other properties in Acapulco, Cancún, Huatulco, Irapuato, Ixtapa, Manzanillo, Mexico City, Querétaro, and Veracruz.

== History ==
Brisas Hotels and Resorts was created in 1991 with four properties:Las Brisas Acapulco, Galeria Plaza in Mexico City, Hacienda Jurica in Querétaro and Las Brisas Ixtapa. On year 2000 the chain added two more properties: Las Hadas Golf Resort & Marina Manzanillo and Las Brisas Huatulco. Galeria Plaza Veracruz, Nizuc in Cancun Riviera Maya is the most recent luxury resort addition.

In June 2010, owner and vice president Antonio Cosio announced an 80 million renovation effort to all Las Brisas properties

== See also ==
- List of hotels in Mexico
- List of companies of Mexico
