= Gruta Brisa Azul =

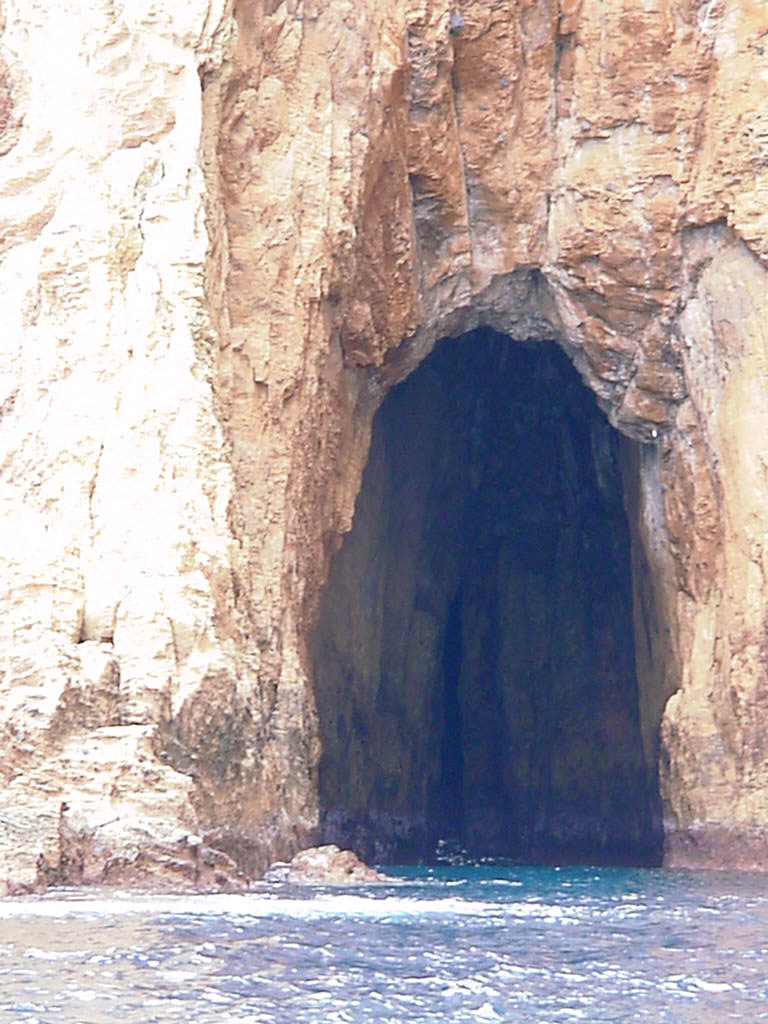
- Interactive map of Gruta Brisa Azul
- Location: Terceira Island (Azores), Portugal
- Coordinates: 38°37′59.21″N 27°8′58.25″W
- Length: 80 metres (260 ft)
- Entrances: 1
- Access: Maritime access by boat

The Gruta Brisa Azul (Blue Breeze Cave), sometimes Gruta Bela Azul (Beautiful Blue Cave), is a geological feature situated in the civil parish of Feteira, in the municipality of Angra do Heroísmo, in the Portuguese archipelago of the Azores.

Formed by maritime erosion, the cave is situated at sea level on the northern face of the small Cabras Islet. It is approximately 80 metres (260 ft) long, and at most, 12 metres (39 ft) wide, with a maximum height of 20 metres (66 ft) at the face. Access to the cave is only made by water.
