= Las Brisas Observatory =

Observatory in Colorado, US

- Organization: Paul Signorelli
- Location: Colorado, United States
- Coordinates: 38°52′36.12″N 105°16′39″W
- Altitude: 2,590.8 m (8,500 ft)
- Website: www.lbo.teuton.org

Telescopes
- Schmidt-Cassegrain telescope: 14-inch reflector
- Schmidt camera: 8-inch

Las Brisas Observatory is an astronomical observatory located 11 miles west of Pikes Peak, Colorado (USA) on Las Brisas ranch. It was built in 1979 and is owned by Paul Signorelli.

== See also ==
- List of observatories
