= Cerro Quiabuc–Las Brisas Nature Reserve =

Nature reserve in Nicaragua

Coordinates: 13.12°N 86.43°W

Cerro Quiabuc-Las Brisas Natural Reserve is a nature reserve in Nicaragua. It is one of the 78 reserves that are under official protection in the country.
