= Captive import =

Marketing term and strategy

Captive import is a marketing term and a strategy for a vehicle that is foreign-built and sold under the name of an importer or by a domestic automaker through its own dealer distribution system.

The United States National Highway Traffic Safety Administration (NHTSA) defines captive imports as those "not domestically manufactured but which is imported in the 1980 model year or thereafter by a manufacturer whose principal place of business is in the United States." This definition was implemented starting with the 1980 model year "to prevent the standards from encouraging the increased importation of these vehicles and exportation of domestic jobs."

A subsidiary of the same company may produce the foreign vehicle, be a joint venture with another firm, or be acquired under license from a completely separate entity. The brand name used may be that of the domestic company, the foreign builder, or an unrelated marque entirely (this is one type of "badge engineering").

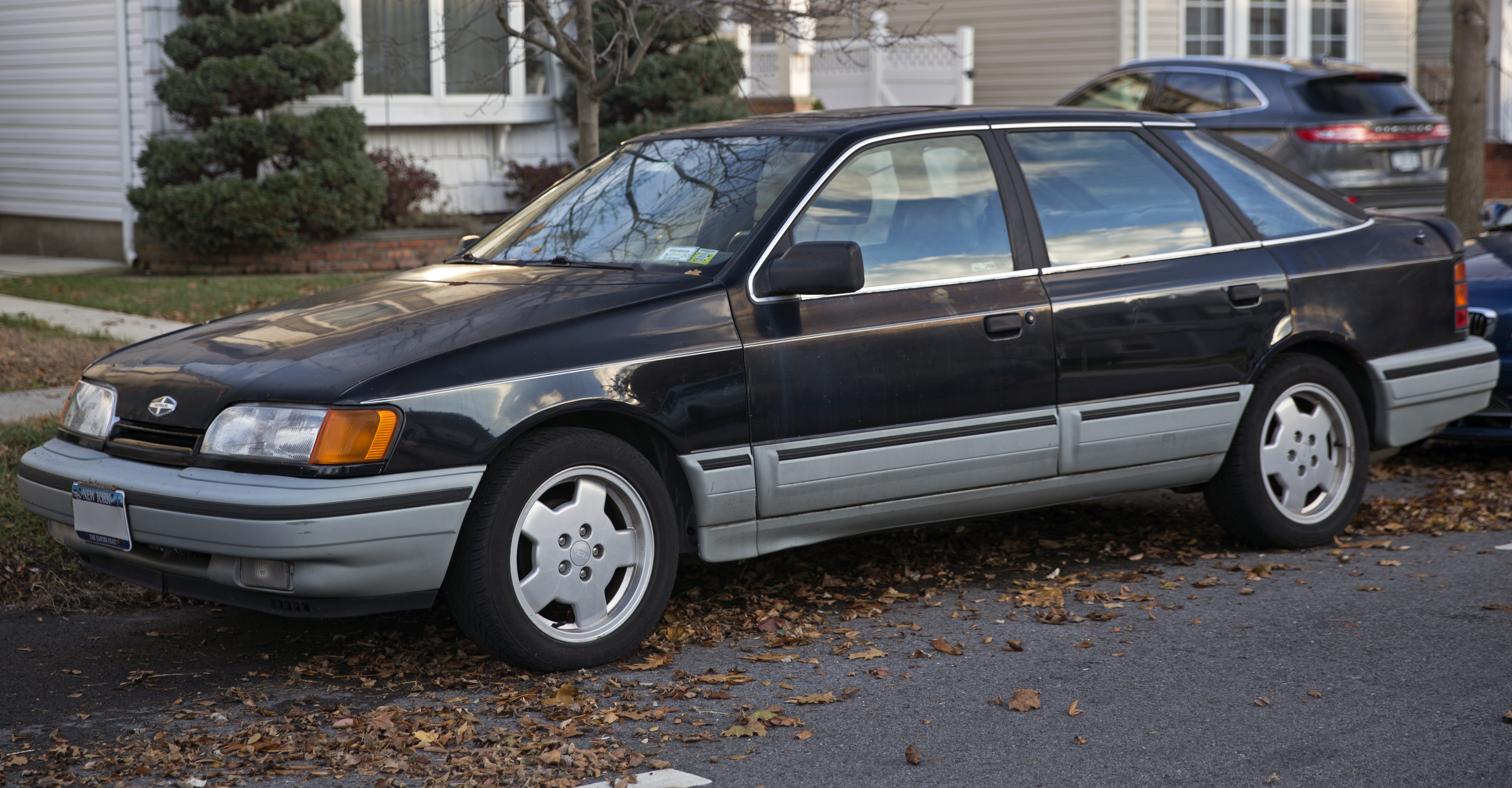
A Merkur Scorpio manufactured in West Germany by Ford of Europe and marketed in the United States, an example of a captive import

== Background ==
Captive import arrangements are usually made to increase the competitiveness of the domestic brand by filling a perceived target market not currently served by its model lineup that is either not practical or not economically feasible to fill from domestic production or a mutually beneficial agreement that helps automakers without a strong distribution network or a presence in a specific country to benefit from the distribution network and stronger brand image of an established automobile manufacturer in that location. One example is the agreement between Chrysler and Mitsubishi Motors, which started in 1971. Chrysler imported Mitsubishi-manufactured vehicles into the United States to fill a void in their compact lineup with cars like the Dodge Colt. Mitsubishi began selling vehicles under their name in the United States in 1982.

In countries or regions where a foreign manufacturer might have a wholly owned subsidiary that develops and manufactures vehicles or a strong manufacturing presence, a captive import can be a vehicle from the manufacturers' indigenous country or an affiliated manufacturer worldwide. Holden was the Australian subsidiary of American General Motors and was considered to be a domestic manufacturer in Australia until Australian domestic production completely ended in 2017. In the past, Holden has also imported the Mexican-built Holden Suburban, a variant of the North American Chevrolet Suburban, along with the Holden Jackaroo built by General Motors' Japanese affiliate Isuzu in Japan. An example of an Australian captive import is the Holden Barina, which has since 1985 been the Suzuki Cultus, two generations of the European Opel Corsa, and is also the Korean Daewoo Kalos (marketed internationally as the Chevrolet Aveo).

For countries that do not have native manufacturers or a development/manufacturing presence, a captive import is a vehicle not manufactured by the specific company that imported the vehicle but sold under its brand. Usually, the vehicle manufacturer might be an affiliate of the importer. The Chevrolet Forester was sold in India by General Motors, where its manufacturer, Japan-based Subaru, does not have a sales presence, and the importation agreement started during the period when the manufacturer of Subaru, Fuji Heavy Industries, was affiliated with General Motors.

A vehicle manufactured in a country where the manufacturers' indigenous nation has a free-trade agreement with other countries in the same region, such as the European Union for Europe, NAFTA for North America, or ASEAN for Southeast Asia, and manufactured in a plant wholly or partially owned by that company should not be considered a captive import.

The integration of manufacturing operations between Canada, Mexico, and the United States has been due to the hospitable trade environment created by the North American Free Trade Agreement (and before NAFTA, the US-Canada Auto Pact), coupled with the proximity of these nations to the U.S. Vehicles made and marketed by European automakers that were eventually acquired by the Big Three automakers, such as Land Rover, Volvo, and Saab, are generally not considered to be captive imports.

Automobile companies have made efforts since the 1990s to streamline operations and become increasingly globalized, making it more challenging to determine the national origin of vehicles and even more complicated when considering outsourcing the worldwide sources of components and parts used to make them.

== American market ==
In the American market, captive imports "blurred national distinctions" because they were designed and built elsewhere, but have a domestic nameplate. The chief reason domestic automakers market captive imports is because "it is cheaper to import those cars than to produce them" in the United States.

The Nash-Healey two-seat sports car was produced for the U.S. market between 1951 and 1954. It combined a Nash Ambassador drivetrain with a European chassis and body and was a product of a partnership between Nash-Kelvinator Corporation and British automaker Donald Healey. After the first model year, the Nash-Healey was restyled and assembled by Pinin Farina in Italy.

The Nash Metropolitan, sold in the U.S. from 1954 until 1962, was a captive import for Nash Motors. It was designed by Nash, unlike most captive imports built by another company, and produced by Austin in the UK specifically for sale in the U.S. By entering into a manufacturing arrangement, Nash would avoid the expense associated with tooling, body panels, and components. When Nash launched this two-seater sub-compact car, it was the first time an American-designed car had been only built in Europe and never assembled in the United States. Unlike typical European cars of the era, its look was "American", and it had a design resemblance to the large or "senior" U.S.-built Nashes. It became one of the few small cars to sell well during the most bulk-obsessed period of U.S. automotive history.

When Mercedes-Benz was seeking entry into the American market in the 1950s, the company signed a marketing agreement with Studebaker–Packard and became a captive brand in their showrooms. Around the same time, Pontiac dealers sold the GM's British-built Vauxhalls from 1958 until 1962.

Ford, who had invented the modern captive-import system in 1948 with the British Anglia and Prefect, added its own European Ford Cortina to its North American dealer network until low demand led to its discontinuation in 1970 when the company introduced its domestic Pinto replacement, and its European market Ford Capri to its U.S. Mercury line in the 1970s. Although the car had features to make it great, the marketing was flawed with a mismatch to the models traditionally sold by Lincoln-Mercury dealers. Ford returned to importing the Mk1 Fiesta in 1978 when the company developed the North American market Escort/Lynx twins until 2013 when the "One Ford" business strategy was in operation, and the European market Mondeo and Fiesta were manufactured in both North America and Europe.

During the same period, Dodge marketed several small Mitsubishi models, mostly sold as Dodge Colts (versions of which would later be marketed under the Plymouth and Eagle brands). Chrysler Corporation did not develop its in-house subcompacts during the late 1960s (which GM and Ford Motor Company had done with the Vega and Pinto), where they partnered with an overseas manufacturer with Mitsubishi and Hillman.

The "Plymouth Cricket" (a rebadged Hillman Avenger) was introduced to the U.S. market in the early 1970s to counter the growing demand for small cars, but not successful.

General Motors marketed its German-built Opel models like the Kadett through Buick dealers in the late 1960s and early 1970s. This venture yielded ambivalent results; the Opels were generally well-regarded, and sales were decent but never substantial. In the 1970s, when Buick decided to phase out its Opels and sell small Isuzus instead, the result was a handful of cars carrying a global brand, Buick Opel, by Isuzu. Buick was not the first to rebadge Isuzus — Chevrolet did the same with their LUV pickup truck in 1972.

The Daewoo-built line of LeMans-branded small cars were marketed by GM in several nations and through Pontiac dealers in the U.S. starting in 1988. They shared nothing with the original 1960s LeMans models. In the late 1980s, GM consolidated most of its various captive imports of the time under the Geo brand, which was exclusively handled by Chevrolet dealers. The cars, built variously by Isuzu (Spectrum, Storm) and Suzuki (Metro, Tracker).

Examples of captive imports in the U.S. have included the Cadillac Catera, a rebadged Opel Omega, the Chevrolet Aveo, built by GM Daewoo, and the Chrysler Crossfire — an American design which mostly uses Mercedes-Benz mechanicals, but was built by Karmann in Germany. The Pontiac GTO, which was built alongside the Australian Holden Monaro, also qualifies. The Saturn Astra is another example. It is a rebadged Opel Astra that is imported from Belgium. The successor for Pontiac's seventh generation Grand Prix, the Pontiac G8, was a modified Holden VE Commodore imported from Australia.

In 2004, GM began marketing the Chevrolet Aveo subcompact, a rebadged Daewoo Kalos (now a rebadged Daewoo Gentra) assembled in South Korea. In 2008, GM started marketing the Saturn Astra, which is a rebadged Opel Astra, assembled in Belgium. Before the brand's phaseout, Pontiac also returned to the captive idea by selling Holden vehicles, first the Holden Monaro as the Pontiac GTO and then the Holden Commodore (VE) as the Pontiac G8. Pontiac dealers also briefly received a version of the Kalos/Gentra/Aveo, which was sold in Canada as the G3 Wave and in the U.S. as the G3.

In 2011, GM once again used a Holden model, the WM/WN Caprice, as a captive import for its Caprice PPV, but designed for law enforcement agencies in the United States and Canada.

In 2013, GM used the Holden Commodore (VF) as the Chevrolet SS performance sedan, from the 2014 model year to 2017.

== Other markets ==
In Europe, there have been relatively few cases of captive imports, and most have been unsuccessful. The Chevrolet Venture minivan was sold as the Opel/Vauxhall Sintra (SWB) and Chevrolet Trans Sport (LWB) in the late-1990s, but was not only not to European tastes, but also gained a bad reputation due to poor results in safety tests. The practice has been revived by PSA Peugeot Citroën with the Peugeot 4007, Peugeot 4008, Citroën C-Crosser, and Citroën C4 Aircross, which are rebadged versions of the Mitsubishi Outlander and Mitsubishi ASX, respectively. However, the introduction of the Ford Mustang to Europe in 2015 has been successful, owing to the Mustang's image and unique positioning.

In the Middle East and South Africa, the Holden Commodore was sold from 1998 to 2013 as the Chevrolet Lumina, with a coupé variant based on the Holden Monaro from 2003 to 2006.

In the Middle East, the Holden Caprice was sold from 2000 to 2017 as the Chevrolet Caprice.

In Brazil, the Australian-built Holden Calais and Berlina were sold from 1998 to 2012 as Chevrolet Omega, replacing the locally built version of the Opel Omega bearing the same name. Despite being well received by the press and public, sales were much worse than its locally built counterpart, simply because of its high price. However, it is used very often as official government cars. Chevrolet also rebranded the Argentine-built Suzuki Vitara as the Chevrolet Tracker after Suzuki stopped selling cars in Brazil, but it never achieved the same sales figures as the original car.

In Japan, where foreign car manufacturers have traditionally struggled to compete in the local market, even rebadging of U.S. models like the Chevrolet Cavalier as a Toyota has failed to improve sales.

In Australia, GM's Holden operation sold the 1975-84 Isuzu Bellett/Gemini, itself a license-built version of the then-current Opel Kadett, as the Holden Gemini. The name was originally Holden-Isuzu Gemini, but after the first TX series, the Isuzu cobranding was dropped. Perhaps the original idea was to foster the Japanese-ness of the model at a time when customers might have seen that as a positive, the Nissan's 610 Bluebird being marketed as the Datsun 180B being a big seller at the time. The Gemini was assembled in Australia at Acacia Ridge in Queensland and Holden was still the highest-selling brand. The Chevrolet LUV produced by Isuzu was also sold from 1973 for a couple of years, the only official Chevrolet branded model available in Australia at the time (and since). Ford sold the Taurus in Japan, Australia, New Zealand, and Hong Kong in 1996, but stopped in 1999. In 1998, the Chevrolet Suburban, was marketed in Australia and New Zealand as a rebadged Holden Suburban with intentions to launch the full-sized SUV in a region that was used to having small to mid-sized SUVs, and the model was discontinued in 2001.

== Reasons for failure ==
Captive imports often fail, and a shift in exchange rates can raise prices to uncompetitive levels.

Some models have been criticized for marginal quality, such as the spate of Daewoo models marketed under domestic General Motors marques during the 2000s, or for being a bad match for the local driving environment.

The commitment of domestic sales and service staff to an unfamiliar vehicle has been questioned, particularly if the import is seen as reducing sales of other, more profitable vehicles in the lineup.

Others fail due to no fault of their own; the Sunbeam Tiger, for instance, an early 1960s example of the concept of an American Ford Windsor engine in a British (Sunbeam Alpine) body and chassis, enjoyed substantial success until Sunbeam became a captive import of Chrysler Corporation in North America. Chrysler could not be realistically expected to sell a car with a Ford engine, and Chrysler V8 engines all had the distributor positioned at the rear of the engine, unlike the front-mounted distributor of the Ford V8, making it impossible to fit the Chrysler engine into the Sunbeam engine bay without major and expensive revisions. Thus this niche of the automotive market was left to be filled with legendary success by the Ford engined Shelby Cobra.

There may be a deeper, structural issue at work, however. It could simply be that a domestic buyer is unlikely to want an import, and an import buyer is unlikely to enter a domestic showroom. Also, consumers of a specific domestic brand might feel that a captive import does not have the qualities that they want and expect from vehicles of domestic vehicles manufactured by that brand. A captive thus easily falls between two stools. This is probably why the practice of using a separate brand name, such as Merkur and General Motors' short-lived Geo, has ceased — the foreignness of the car is thus discreetly made less apparent. Another factor concerns servicing where captives often do not share components with their domestic counterparts - this often leads to parts incompatibility and/or backorders.

Another view is that the practice could be seen by the public as simply dishonest, causing complete rejection. Certainly in cases when identical models are available at the same time with only the badges differentiating them such as what happened under the failed Button car plan in Australia during the 1980s.

== Exceptions ==
Not every vehicle that appears to be a captive import really is. A foreign-designed or badged vehicle assembled in the market where it is sold does not fall into this category. Such vehicles are frequently the result of joint venture or strategic alliance arrangements between automakers.

For example, the Renault Alliance was sold through American Motors (AMC) dealers starting in the fall of 1982 until production ended on 5 June 1987 Chrysler acquired AMC. The Alliance was assembled by AMC as part of a tie-up with the French company. The 1985 through 1988 Chevrolet Nova and the later Geo Prizm were a Toyota design and shared the Chevrolet showroom with many captives, were built in the U.S. by the GM-Toyota NUMMI joint venture. The Eagle Talon and Plymouth Laser, both related to the Mitsubishi Eclipse, were manufactured in the U.S. by Diamond-Star Motors, a Chrysler-Mitsubishi Motors joint venture. Although Australia's Holden often shared planning and hardware with the rest of GM's global operations, which included Opel and Isuzu, it preferred assembling its versions of such vehicles locally. Rover and Honda have co-produced models for the European market, as have Alfa Romeo and Nissan. None of these would be considered imports. With the complete ceasing of automotive production in Australia by Holden and Ford Australia in 2016, who were both considered indigenous Australian automakers, both will be switching to a wholly imported lineup. No vehicle sold by Holden or Ford after the end of Australian production should be considered a captive import since neither maintains an Australian manufacturing presence.

== Notable captive imports ==
=== United States ===
Model	Year(s)	Country of assembly	Original model
Buick Cascada	2016–2019	Poland	Opel Cascada
Buick Encore	2013–2022	South Korea	Opel Mokka
Buick Encore GX	2021–present	South Korea	
Buick Envision	2016–present	China	
Buick Opel	1976–1980	Japan	Isuzu Gemini
Buick Regal	2010–2011 (some, but not all 2011)	Germany	Opel Insignia
Cadillac Catera	1997–2001	Germany	Opel Omega
Chevrolet Aveo	2004–2011	South Korea	Daewoo Kalos
Chevrolet Caprice PPV	2011–2017	Australia	Holden Caprice
Chevrolet City Express	2014–2018	Japan/Mexico	Nissan NV200
Chevrolet LUV	1972–1982	Japan	Isuzu P'up
Chevrolet SS	2014–2017	Australia	Holden Commodore (VF)
Chevrolet Spectrum	1985–1988	Japan	Isuzu Gemini
Chevrolet Sprint	1985–1988	Japan	Suzuki Cultus
Chevrolet Trailblazer	2021–present	South Korea	
Chrysler Conquest	1987–1989	Japan	Mitsubishi Starion
Chrysler Crossfire	2004–2008	Germany	Mercedes-Benz SLK-Class
Chrysler TC by Maserati	1989–1991	Italy	
Dodge Challenger	1978–1983	Japan	Mitsubishi Galant Lambda
Dodge/Plymouth Colt	1971–1994	Japan	Mitsubishi Galant; Mitsubishi Mirage
Dodge Conquest	1984–1986	Japan	Mitsubishi Starion
Dodge D-50	1979–1986	Japan	Mitsubishi Forte
Dodge Hornet	2023–2026	Italy	Alfa Romeo Tonale
Dodge Raider	1987–1989	Japan	Mitsubishi Pajero
Dodge Ram 50	1987–1989	Japan	Mitsubishi Mighty Max
Dodge Stealth	1991–1996	Japan	Mitsubishi GTO
Eagle Medallion	1988–1989	France	Renault 21
Eagle Summit	1989–1996	Japan	Mitsubishi Mirage; Mitsubishi Lancer
Ford Anglia	1948–1967	United Kingdom	
Ford Aspire	1994–1997	South Korea	Kia Avella
Ford Cortina	1962–1970	United Kingdom	Lotus Cortina
Ford Courier	1972–1982	Japan	Mazda B-Series
Ford EcoSport	2018–2022	India	
Ford Festiva	1988–1993	South Korea	Kia Pride
Ford Fiesta	1978–1980	Germany	
Ford Focus RS	2016–2018	Germany	
Ford Transit Connect	2010–2013	Turkey	
Ford Transit Connect	2014–2023	Spain	
Geo Metro	1989–1994	Japan	Suzuki Cultus
Geo Spectrum	1989	Japan	Isuzu Gemini
Geo Storm	1990–1993	Japan	Isuzu Piazza
Geo Tracker	1989–1990 (some, but not all 1990)	Japan	Suzuki Escudo
Jeep Renegade	2014–present	Italy	
Lincoln Nautilus	2024–present	China	
Mercury Capri	1970–1977	Germany	Ford Capri
Mercury Capri	1991–1994	Australia	Ford Capri (Australia)
Mercury Tracer (3-door model)	1988–1989	Japan	Mazda 323
Merkur Scorpio	1988–1989	Germany	Ford Scorpio
Merkur XR4Ti	1985–1989	Germany	Ford Sierra XR4i
Plymouth Arrow	1976–1980	Japan	Mitsubishi Celeste
Plymouth Arrow Truck	1979–1982	Japan	Mitsubishi Forte
Plymouth Champ	1979–1982	Japan	Mitsubishi Mirage
Plymouth Conquest	1984–1986	Japan	Mitsubishi Starion
Plymouth Cricket	1971–1973	United Kingdom	Hillman Avenger
Plymouth Sapporo	1978–1983	Japan	Mitsubishi Galant Lambda
Pontiac G3	2009	South Korea	Daewoo Kalos
Pontiac G8	2008–2009	Australia	Holden Commodore
Pontiac GTO	2004–2006	Australia	Holden Monaro
Pontiac LeMans	1988–1993	South Korea	Daewoo LeMans
Ram ProMaster City	2015–2022	Turkey	Fiat Doblò
Saturn Astra	2008–2009	Belgium	Opel Astra
Saturn Vue	2007–2009	South Korea	Daewoo Winstorm
Vauxhall Victor (sold by Pontiac dealers)	1957–1962	United Kingdom	

=== Japan ===
Model	Year(s)	Country of assembly	Original model
Acura Integra Type S	2026–present	United States	
Chevrolet Optra (sold by Suzuki dealers)	2005–2007	South Korea	Daewoo Lacetti
Chevrolet TrailBlazer (sold by Suzuki dealers)	2001–2009	United States	
Daihatsu Gran Max	2020–present	Indonesia	
Honda Accord (sedan)	2020–2022, 2023–present	Thailand	
Honda Accord (coupe)	1988–1997	United States	
Honda Accord (wagon)	1991–1997	United States	
Honda Civic (coupe)	1992–2000	United States	
Honda Civic (hatchback)	2017–2021	United Kingdom	
Honda Civic Type R	2001–2005, 2009–2011, 2015–2021	United Kingdom	
Honda Crossroad	1993–1998	United Kingdom	Land Rover Discovery
Honda CR-V	2026–present	Thailand	
Honda CR-V e:FCEV	2024–present	United States	
Honda Element	2002–2006	United States	
Honda Fit Aria	2003–2008	Thailand	Honda City
Honda Insight	2026–present	China	Honda e:NS2
Honda Inspire/Saber	1998–2002	United States	Acura TL
Honda LaGreat	1999–2005	Canada	Honda Odyssey (North America)
Honda MDX	2003–2006	Canada	Acura MDX
Honda NSX	2017–2022	United States	Acura NSX
Honda Odyssey	2023–present	China	
Honda Passport	2026–present	United States	
Honda WR-V	2024–present	India	Honda Elevate
Isuzu Statesman DeVille	1973–1976	Australia	Holden Statesman HQ
Mazda Bongo	2020–present	Indonesia	Daihatsu Gran Max
Mazda CX-3	2022–present	Thailand	
Mazda Roadpacer AP	1975–1977	Australia	Holden HJ/HX
Mitsubishi Diamante (some)	1991–2005	Australia	Mitsubishi Magna
Mitsubishi Eclipse	1990–1998, 2004–2006	United States	
Mitsubishi Mirage	2012–2023	Thailand	
Mitsubishi Pajero	2026–present	Thailand	
Mitsubishi Triton	2006–2011, 2024–present	Thailand	
Mitsuoka Viewt	2011–2022	Thailand	Nissan March
Nissan Dualis	2007–2014	United Kingdom	Nissan Qashqai
Nissan Kicks	2020–2026	Thailand	
Nissan Latio	2012–2016	Thailand	Nissan Almera
Nissan March	2010–2022	Thailand	
Nissan Mistral	1994–1999	Spain	Nissan Terrano II
Nissan Murano	2026–present	United States	
Nissan Primera (hatchback)	1990–2002	United Kingdom	
Nissan Pulsar Milano X1	1984–1986	Italy	Alfa Romeo Arna
Subaru Ascent	2026–present	United States	
Subaru Traviq	2001–2004	Thailand	Opel Zafira
Suzuki Baleno	2016–2020	India	
Suzuki e Vitara	2026–present	India	
Suzuki Escudo	2015–2024	Hungary	Suzuki Vitara
Suzuki Fronx	2024–present	India	
Suzuki Jimny (5-door model)	2023–present	India	
Suzuki Splash	2008–2014	Hungary	
Suzuki SX4 S-Cross	2015–2020	Hungary	
Tommykaira ZZ	1990-2000	United Kingdom	
Toyota Avalon	1995–1999	United States	
Toyota Avensis	2003–2009, 2011–2018	United Kingdom	
Toyota Camry	2026–present	United States	
Toyota Cavalier	1996–2000	United States	Chevrolet Cavalier
Toyota GR Supra	2019–2026	Austria	BMW Z4
Toyota Highlander	2026–present	United States	
Toyota Hilux	2017–present	Thailand	
Toyota Land Cruiser FJ	2026–present	Thailand	
Toyota LiteAce/TownAce	2008–2020 (LiteAce); 2008–present (TownAce)	Indonesia	Daihatsu Gran Max
Toyota Pronard	2000–2005	United States	Toyota Avalon
Toyota Scepter (wagon/coupe)	1992–1996	United States	Toyota Camry (wagon/coupe)
Toyota Tundra	2026–present	United States	
Toyota Voltz	2002–2004	United States	Pontiac Vibe

=== Europe ===
Model	Year(s)	Country of assembly	Original model
Audi Q5	2016–present	Mexico	
BMW 2 Series	2021–present	Mexico	
BMW iX3	2020–2024	China	
BMW X3	2010–present	United States; South Africa	
BMW X4	2014–2025	United States	
BMW X5	1999–present	United States	
BMW X6	2007–present	United States	
BMW X7	2018–present	United States	
BMW Z3	1995–2002	United States	
BMW Z4	2002–2008	United States	
Chevrolet Trans Sport	1997–2007	United States	Pontiac Trans Sport
Chevrolet Alero	1999–2001	United States	Oldsmobile Alero
Chevrolet Evanda	2000–2006	South Korea	Daewoo Magnus
Chevrolet Lacetti/Nubira	2002–2009	South Korea	Daewoo Lacetti
Chevrolet Kalos/Aveo	2002–2014	South Korea	Daewoo Kalos
Chevrolet Lanos	2005–2009	South Korea	Daewoo Lanos
Chevrolet Matiz/Spark	2005–2014	South Korea	Daewoo Matiz
Chevrolet Epica	2006–2011	South Korea	Daewoo Tosca
Chevrolet Captiva	2006–2014	South Korea	Daewoo Winstorm
Chevrolet Cruze	2008–2014	South Korea	Daewoo Lacetti Premiere
Chevrolet Orlando	2011–2014	South Korea	
Citroën Ami	2020–present	Morocco	
Citroën C-Crosser	2007–2012	Japan	Mitsubishi Outlander
Citroën C4 Aircross	2012–2017	Japan	Mitsubishi ASX
Citroën C5 X	2021–present	China	
Cupra Tavascan	2024–present	China	
Dacia Dokker	2012–2021	Morocco	
Dacia Jogger	2024–present	Morocco	
Dacia Lodgy	2012–2022	Morocco	
Dacia Sandero	2020–present	Morocco	
Dacia Spring	2021–present	China	Renault City K-ZE
DS 9	2020–2024	China	
Fiat 124 Spider	2016–2019	Japan	Mazda MX-5
Fiat Fiorino	1988–2014	Brazil	
Fiat Freemont	2011–2015	Mexico	Dodge Journey
Fiat Fullback	2016–2019	Thailand	Mitsubishi Triton
Fiat Topolino	2023–present	Morocco	Citroën Ami
Ford Cougar	1998–2002	United States	Mercury Cougar
Ford EcoSport	2014–2017	India	
Ford Edge	2014–2021	Canada	
Ford Explorer (United Kingdom)	1997–2001	United States	
Ford Explorer	2019–2024	United States	
Ford Ka	2016–2020	Brazil	
Ford Maverick	2001–2006	United States	Ford Escape
Ford Mustang	2015–present	United States	
Ford Mustang Mach-E	2021–present	Mexico	
Ford Probe	1989–1997	United States	
Ford Ranger	2011–present	South Africa	
Ford Transit City	2026–present	China	JMC E-Fushun
Iveco eMoovy	2025–present	South Korea	Hyundai ST1
Lancia Flavia	2012–2014	United States	Chrysler 200
Lancia Thema	2011–2014	Canada	Chrysler 300
Lancia Voyager	2011–2015	Canada	Chrysler Voyager
Lotus Eletre	2023–present	China	
Lotus Emeya	2024–present	China	
Mercedes-Benz M-Class/GLE	2005–present	United States	
Mercedes-Benz R-Class	2005–2017	United States	
Mercedes-Benz GL-Class/GLS	2006–present	United States	
Mercedes-Benz GLB	2019–2026	Mexico	
Every MG model made after the SAIC acquisition	2006–present	China	
Mini Aceman	2024–present	China	
Mini Cooper E/SE	2024–present	China	
Opel/Vauxhall Ampera	2012–2016	United States	Chevrolet Volt
Opel Ampera-e	2017–2020	United States	Chevrolet Bolt
Opel/Vauxhall Antara	2006–2015	South Korea	Daewoo Winstorm
Opel/Vauxhall Frontera	1992–2004	Japan	Isuzu MU
Opel GT	2006–2009	United States	Saturn Sky
Opel Karl/Vauxhall Viva	2015–2019	South Korea	Chevrolet Spark
Opel/Vauxhall Mokka	2012–2020	South Korea	
Opel/Vauxhall Monterey	1992–2003	Japan	Isuzu Bighorn
Opel Rocks Electric	2021–present	Morocco	Citroën Ami
Opel/Vauxhall Sintra	1996–1999	United States	Chevrolet Venture
Peugeot 4007	2007–2012	Japan	Mitsubishi Outlander
Peugeot 4008	2012–2017	Japan	Mitsubishi ASX
Peugeot iOn	2011–2018	Japan	Mitsubishi i-MIEV
Polestar 1	2019–2022	China	
Polestar 2	2020–present	China	
Polestar 3	2024–present	China; United States	
Polestar 4 (coupe SUV)	2024–present	China	
Polestar 4 (SUV)	2026–present	South Korea	
Renault Arkana	2020–present	South Korea	Renault Samsung XM3
Renault Express	2021–2024	Morocco	Dacia Dokker
Renault Koleos	2008–2021	South Korea	Renault Samsung QM5 / QM6
Renault Latitude	2010–2015	South Korea	Renault Samsung SM5
Renault Twizy	2019–2023	South Korea	
Rover CityRover	2003–2005	India	Tata Indica
Saab 9-7X	2004–2008	United States	
Saab 9-4X	2011	Mexico	Cadillac SRX
Smart #1	2022–present	China	
Smart #3	2023–present	China	
Smart #5	2025–present	China	
Vauxhall Monaro	2001–2006	Australia	Holden Monaro
Vauxhall VXR8	2007–2017	Australia	HSV Clubsport / HSV GTS
Volkswagen Amarok	2010–2012	Argentina	
Volkswagen Amarok	2022–present	South Africa	Ford Ranger
Volkswagen Beetle	2011–2019	Mexico	
Volkswagen Caddy	1982–1992	Bosnia and Herzegovina (Yugoslavia)	
Volkswagen Fox	2005–2011	Brazil	
Volkswagen Jetta	2005–2018	Mexico	
Volkswagen New Beetle	1999–2011	Mexico	
Volvo ES90	2025–present	China	
Volvo EX30	2024–2025	China	
Volvo EX90	2024–present	United States	
Volvo S60	2019–2025	United States	
Volvo S90	2017–2025	China	

=== Oceania ===
Model	Year(s)	Country of assembly	Original model
Ford Maverick (Australia)	1988–1994	Japan	Nissan Patrol
Ford Courier	1985–2006	Japan/Thailand	Mazda B-Series
Ford Laser	1981–2003	Japan	Mazda 323
Ford Taurus Ghia (Australia and New Zealand)	1996–1998	United States	Ford Taurus
Ford Telstar	1982–1999	Japan	Mazda Capella
Holden Barina	1985–1994	Japan	Suzuki Cultus
Holden Barina	1994–2005	Spain	Opel Corsa
Holden Barina	2005–2011	South Korea	Daewoo Kalos
Holden Camira JJ (New Zealand)	1984–1987	Japan	Isuzu Aska
Holden Commodore	2017–2020	Germany	Opel Insignia
Holden Cruze	2001–2008	Japan	Suzuki Swift
Holden Jackaroo	1981–2005	Japan	Isuzu Bighorn
Holden Suburban	1998–2001	Mexico	Chevrolet Suburban
Holden Vectra	1995–2007	Germany	Opel Vectra
Holden Viva	2005–2008	South Korea	Daewoo Lacetti
Holden Volt	2012–2013	United States	Chevrolet Volt
Pontiac LeMans (New Zealand)	1986–1994	South Korea	Daewoo LeMans
Rambler Rebel	1967–1970	United States	AMC Rebel
Rover 416i	1985–1989	Japan	Honda Quint Integra

=== Other markets ===
Model	Year(s)	Country of sale	Country of assembly	Imported by	Original model
Chevrolet Caprice	1998–2017	several countries	Australia	General Motors	Holden Caprice; Holden Statesman
Chevrolet Cassia	2000–2002	Philippines	Japan	General Motors Philippines	Suzuki Cultus Crescent
Chevrolet Epica	2004–2006	Canada	South Korea	General Motors Canada	Daewoo Magnus
Chevrolet Express Max	2025–present	Mexico	China	General Motors de México	Maxus V70
Chevrolet Forester	2003–2007	India	Japan	General Motors India	Subaru Forester
Chevrolet Lumina	1998–2013	several countries	Australia	General Motors	Holden Commodore
Chevrolet Lumina	2005–2006	Philippines	China	General Motors Philippines	Buick Regal
Chevrolet Omega	1998–2011	Brazil	Australia	General Motors do Brasil	Holden Calais; Holden Berlina
Chevrolet Optra	2004–2008	Canada	South Korea	General Motors Canada	Daewoo Lacetti
Chevrolet Optra	2014–2023	Egypt	China	General Motors Egypt	Baojun 630
Chevrolet S10 Max	2021–present	Mexico	China	General Motors de México	Maxus T60
Chevrolet Spark EUV	2025–present	several countries	China	General Motors	Baojun Yep Plus
Chevrolet Venture	1999–2006	Philippines	China	General Motors Philippines	Buick GL8
Daihatsu Sirion	2007-present	Indonesia	Malaysia	Astra Daihatsu Motor	Perodua Myvi
Dodge Attitude	2005–2014	Mexico	South Korea	Chrysler Mexico	Hyundai Accent
Dodge Attitude	2015–2024	Mexico	Thailand	Chrysler Mexico	Mitsubishi Attrage
Dodge Attitude	2024–present	Mexico	China	Chrysler Mexico	Trumpchi Empow
Daewoo Veritas	2008–2010	South Korea	Australia	GM Daewoo	Holden Caprice (WM)
Dodge 1000	2007–2008	Mexico	Taiwan	Chrysler Mexico	CMC Delica
Dodge/Eagle 2000GTX	1989–1992	Canada	Japan	Chrysler Canada	Mitsubishi Galant (sixth generation)
Nissan Aprio	2008–2010	Mexico	Brazil	Nissan Mexico	Dacia Logan
Passport Optima	1988–1991	Canada	South Korea	General Motors Canada	Daewoo LeMans
Perodua Nautica	2008–2009	Malaysia	Japan	Perodua	Daihatsu Terios
Pontiac Firefly	1989–2001	Canada	Japan	General Motors Canada	Suzuki Cultus
Proton eMas 5	2025–present	Malaysia	China	Proton	Geely EX2
Proton eMas 7	2024–present	Malaysia	China	Proton	Geely EX5
Proton eMas 7 PHEV	2026–present	Malaysia	China	Proton	Geely Starship 7
Proton X70	2018–2020	Malaysia	China	Proton	Geely Boyue
Renault Samsung QM3	2013–2019	South Korea	Spain	Renault Samsung	Renault Captur
Timor S515 (some)	1996–1998 (sales continued until 2007)	Indonesia	South Korea	Timor Putra Nasional	Kia Sephia
Pyeonghwa 410	1994–2002	North Korea	Germany	Pyeonghwa	Mercedes-Benz 190
Pyeonghwa Ppeokkugi	2002–present	North Korea	Vietnam	Pyeonghwa	Fiat Doblò
Pyeonghwa Ppeokkugi 4WD-B	2009–present	North Korea	China	Pyeonghwa	Huanghai Qisheng CUV
Pyeonghwa Ppeokkugi 4WD-C	2009–present	North Korea	Vietnam	Pyeonghwa	
Pyeonghwa Hwiparam II	2005–present	North Korea	China	Pyeonghwa	Brilliance BS4
Pyeonghwa Hwiparam III	2011–present	North Korea	China	Pyeonghwa	Brilliance BS2
Pyeonghwa Paso 990	2011–present	North Korea	China	Pyeonghwa	DFSK K-Series
Pyeonghwa Samchunri	2005–present	North Korea	China	Pyeonghwa	Jinbei Haise
Pyeonghwa Junma 1606	2013–present	North Korea	China	Pyeonghwa	FAW-Volkswagen Sagitar
Pyeonghwa Junma 2008	2013–present	North Korea	China	Pyeonghwa	FAW-Volkswagen CC
