= Lotus Emeya =

Battery electric executive car

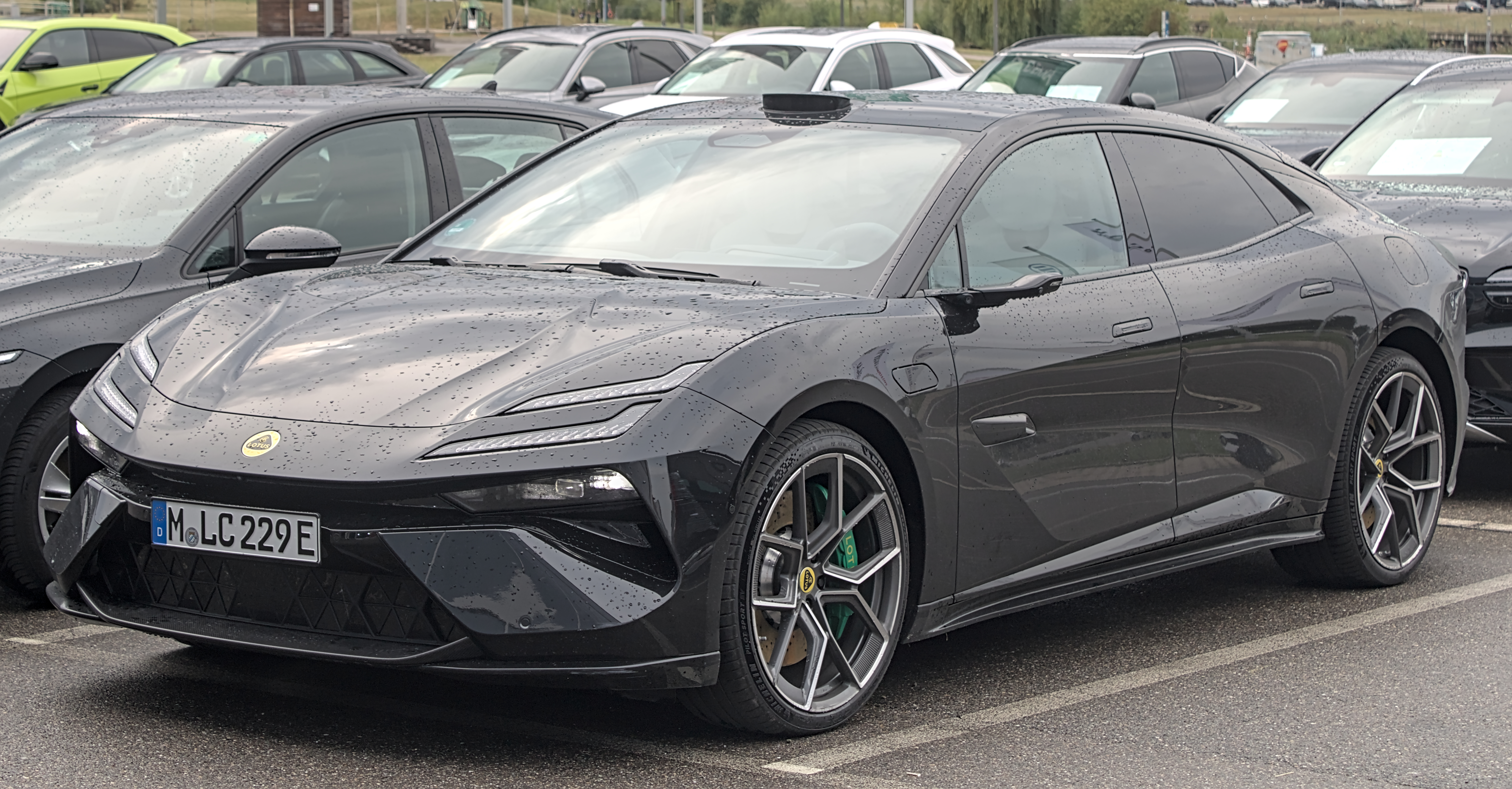

Overview
- Manufacturer: Lotus Cars
- Also called: Lotus NYO Emeya (China, 2024)
- Production: 2024–present
- Assembly: China: Wuhan, Hubei (Wuhan Lotus Technology)
- Designer: Ben Payne

Body and chassis
- Class: Executive car (E)
- Body style: 5-door liftback sedan
- Layout: Dual-motor, all-wheel-drive
- Platform: SEA-S
- Related: Lotus Eletre

Powertrain
- Electric motor: 2× Permanent Magnet Synchronous motors
- Power output: 592 hp (441 kW; 600 PS); 905 hp (675 kW; 918 PS) (R-series)
- Transmission: 1-speed direct-drive (2-speed, rear motor of the R-series)

Dimensions
- Wheelbase: 3,070 mm (120.9 in)
- Length: 5,139 mm (202.3 in)
- Width: 2,005 mm (78.9 in)
- Height: 1,459–1,467 mm (57.4–57.8 in)
- Kerb weight: 2,550 kg (5,622 lb)

The Lotus Emeya is a battery electric executive car manufactured by the Chinese-owned British sports car manufacturer Lotus Cars, with production beginning in 2024. Described by Lotus as a "hyper GT", it is a grand tourer with a five-door liftback body style. It was revealed on 7 September 2023 as the company's third electric vehicle - following the Eletre and the Evija - and second vehicle produced in China, after the aforementioned Eletre. The car is positioned by Lotus to compete with Porsche Taycan, Tesla Model S, Lucid Air, and Audi e-tron GT.

== Overview ==
On 29 August 2023, Lotus confirmed that the production version of the Type 133 will be called the Emeya. It was revealed officially on 7 September 2023 in New York City.

As of May 2024, the Emeya is available for order in the UK starting at £94,950 and in the EU at €106,400. With a dual-motor, all-wheel-drive layout (Uprated rear motor with 2-speed gearbox, R-series), the car produces between 592 hp (441 kW; 600 PS) to 905 hp (675 kW; 918 PS) in the R trim, which will see off 0-62mph (0 to 100 km/h) in 2.78 seconds, with a range of up to 379 miles (610 kilometres).

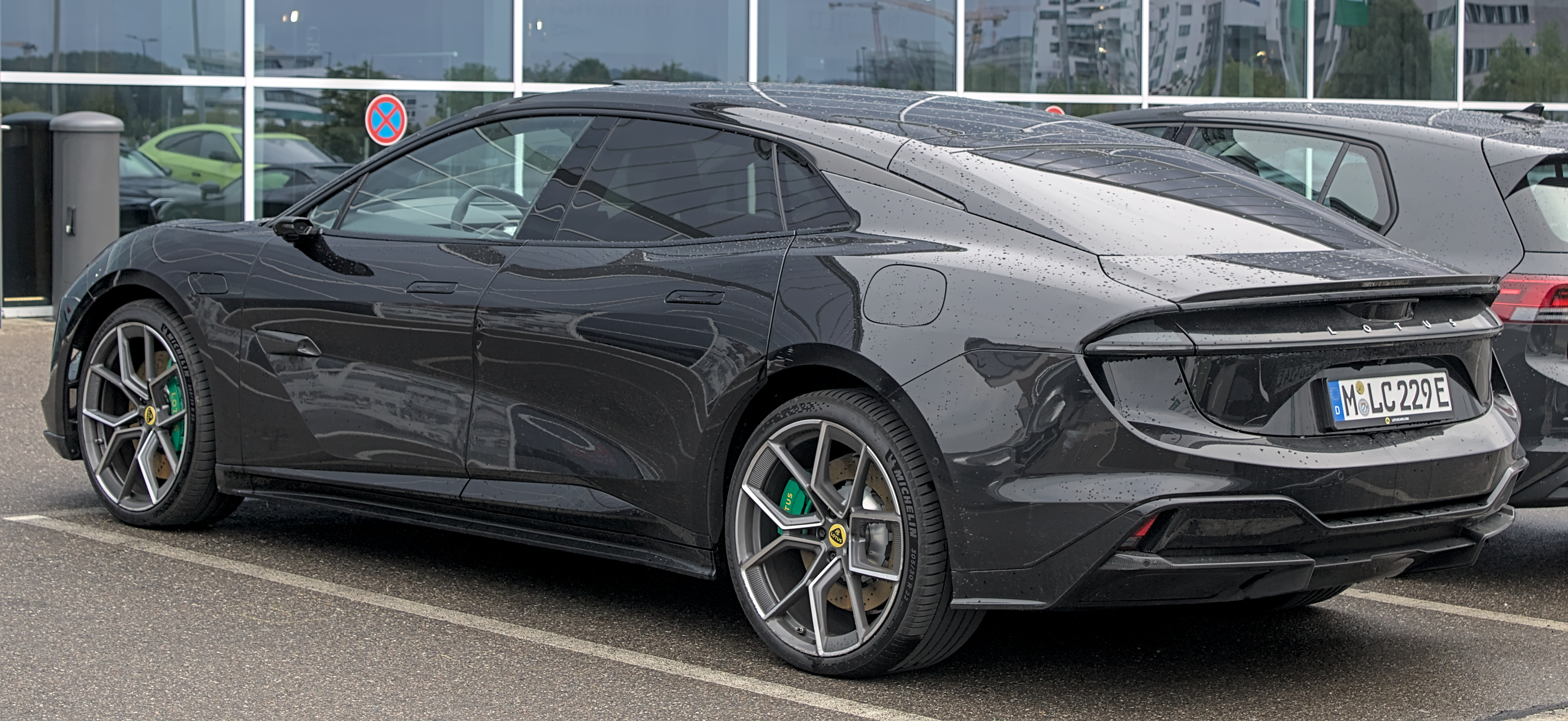
Rear view

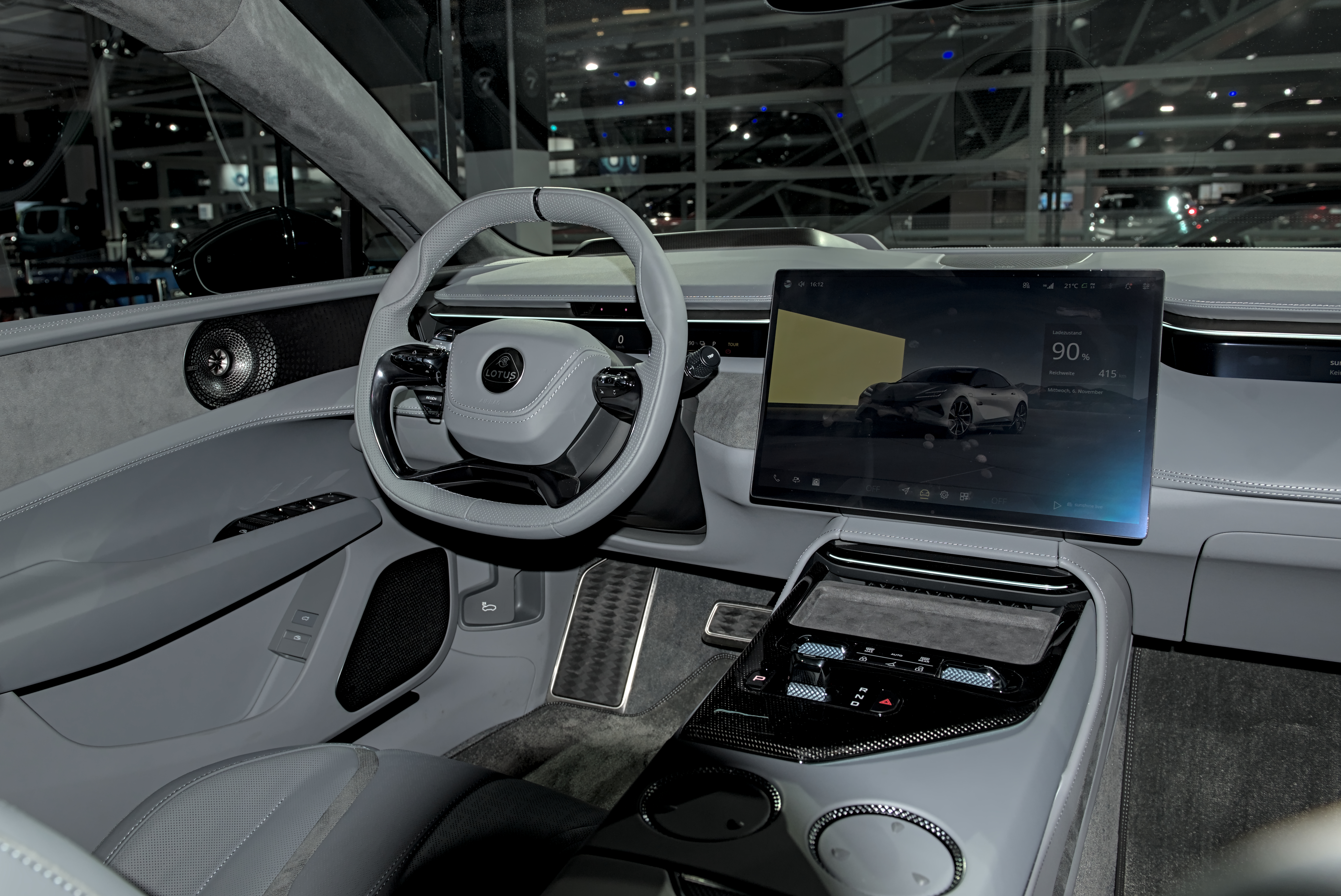
Interior

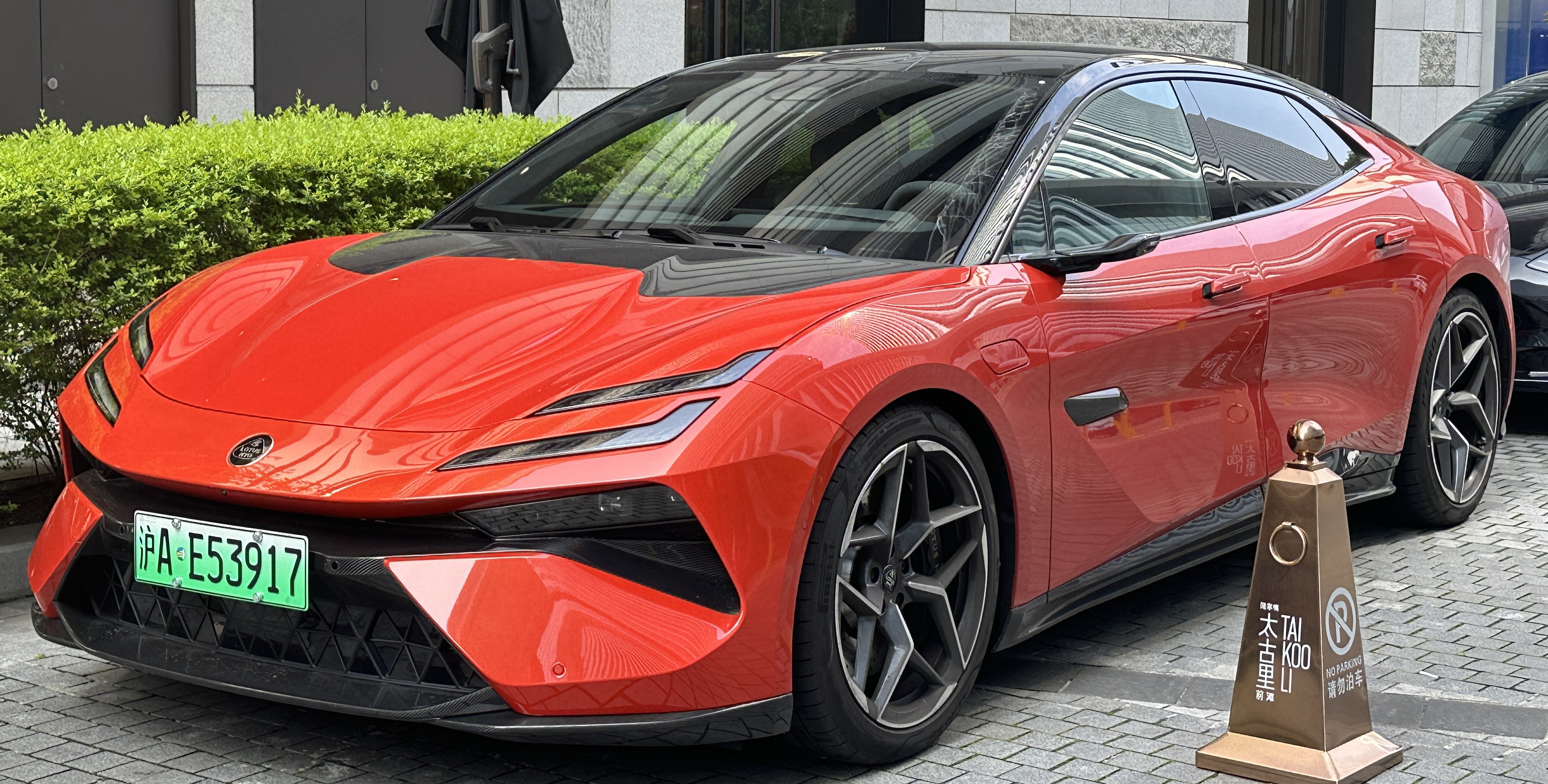
Lotus NYO Emeya

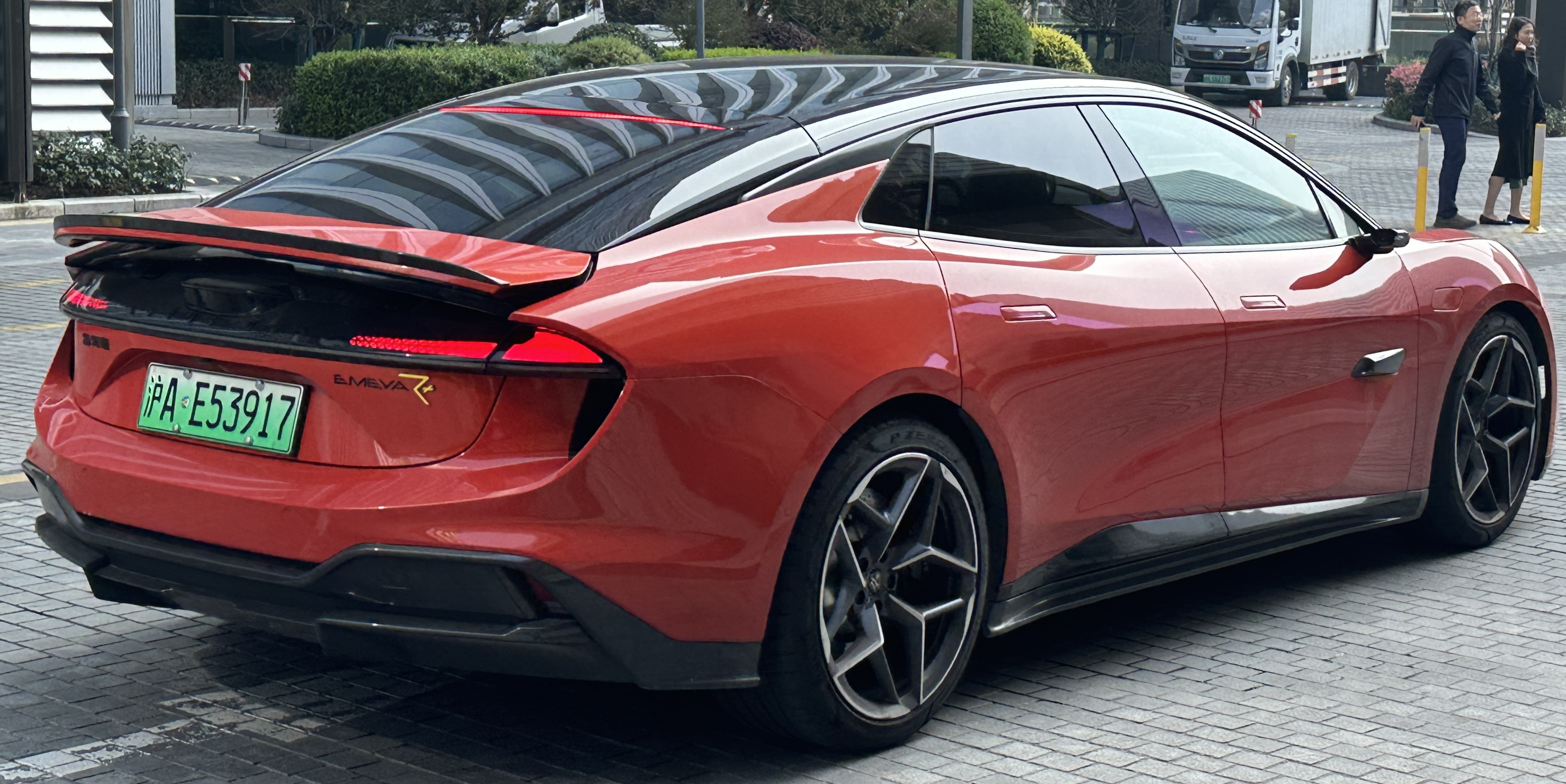
Rear view

== Sales ==
Year	China
2024	1,256
2025	1,083
