= Chevrolet Suburban (eighth generation) =

Chevrolet/GMC Suburban (GMT400; eighth generation)
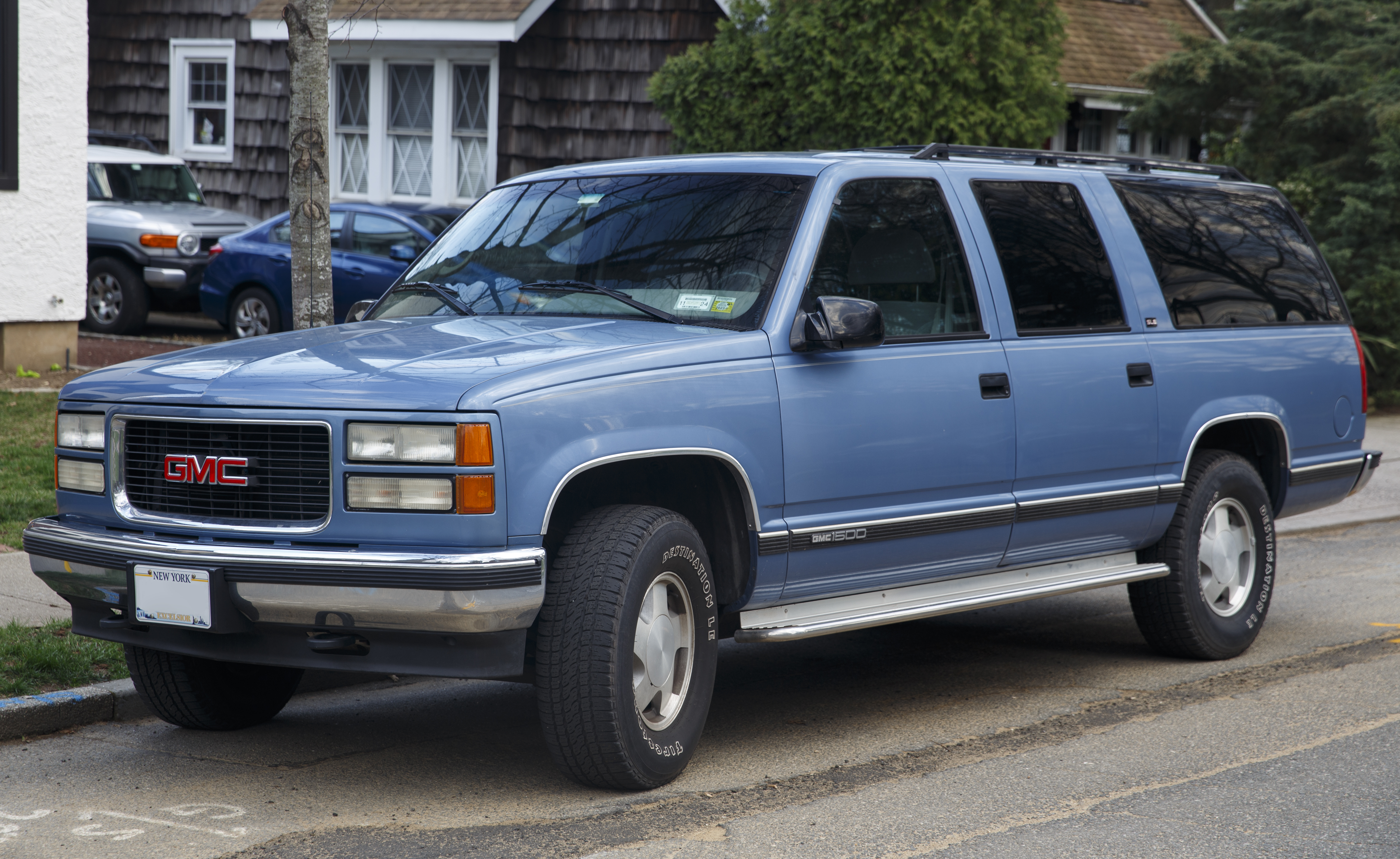
- 1995 GMC Suburban 1500

Overview
- Also called: GMC Suburban; Holden Suburban (Oceania)
- Production: October 1991 – October 1999 (U.S.); February 1998 – January 2001 (Australia)
- Model years: 1992–1999 (U.S.); 1998–2001 (Australia)
- Assembly: Janesville, Wisconsin (Janesville Assembly); Silao, Guanajuato, Mexico (Silao Assembly)
- Designer: Chuck Jordan (1988)

Body and chassis
- Class: Full-size SUV
- Body style: 5-door station wagon
- Layout: Front engine, rear-wheel drive / four-wheel drive
- Platform: GMT410/425
- Related: Chevrolet Tahoe/GMC Yukon; Chevrolet/GMC C/K

Powertrain
- Engine: Gasoline: 5.7 L (350 cu in) L05 V8 (1992–1995); 5.7 L (350 cu in) Vortec L31 V8 (1996–1999); 7.4 L (454 cu in) L19 V8 (2500; 1992–1995); 7.4 L (454 cu in) Vortec L29 V8 (2500; 1996–1999); Diesel: 6.5 L (395 cu in) L65 turbo V8 (1994–1999)
- Transmission: 4-speed 4L60 automatic (1500 5.7L); 4-speed 4L80 automatic (diesel and 2500)

Dimensions
- Wheelbase: 131.5 in (3,340 mm)
- Length: Chevrolet: 219.5 in (5,575 mm); 1992–94 GMC: 218.9 in (5,560 mm); 1995–96 GMC: 220.0 in (5,588 mm)
- Width: 77.0 in (1,956 mm)
- Height: 68.8 in (1,748 mm) (1992–94 1500 2WD) – 74.6 in (1,895 mm) (1997–99 2500 4WD)

Chronology
- Predecessor: Chevrolet/GMC Suburban (Rounded Line)
- Successor: GMC Yukon XL (for GMC Suburban)

The eighth generation of the Chevrolet Suburban (also known as the GMC Suburban) is a full-size SUV that was marketed by Chevrolet and GMC from the 1992 to 1999 model years. The first redesign of the model line since 1973, the Suburban completed the transition of the C/K line from the Rounded Line chassis to the GMT400 platform that replaced it.

In several firsts, the Suburban was fitted with independent front suspension for both rear-wheel drive and 4x4 vehicles, driver-side and dual airbags, daytime running lamps, and OnStar subscription telematics; it is also the first Suburban sold exclusively with an automatic transmission. This is the first generation sold as the shorter-wheelbase Chevrolet Tahoe/GMC Yukon/Cadillac Escalade five-door SUV. Conversely, this is the final generation of the model line marketed as the GMC Suburban and is also the final generation of the model line to derive its bodywork from the full-size pickup line for its entire production run.

The GMT400 Suburban was assembled by GM at its Janesville Assembly facility (Janesville, Wisconsin) and in Silao, Guanajuato, Mexico.

== Design overview ==
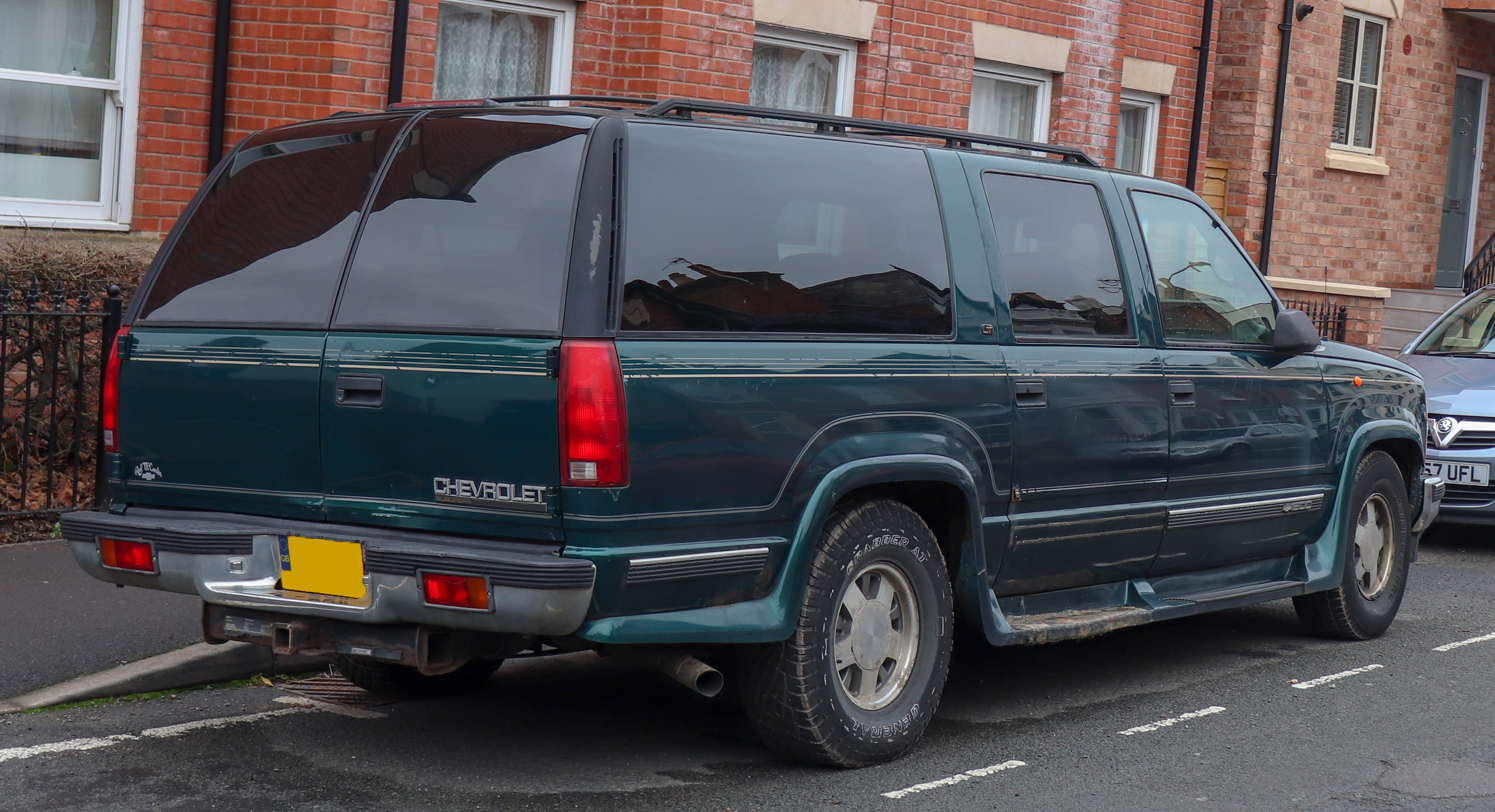
Rear view (European model)

The eighth generation, GMT400-based Chevrolet Suburban and its derivatives was introduced in December 1991 for the 1992 model year. The C/K pickup had already switched to the newer platform in 1987 for the 1988 model year. Both 2WD and 4WD models—designated "C" and "K"—were offered, as well as half-ton and three-quarter-ton ("1500" and "2500") models.

=== Chassis ===
The eighth-generation Suburban is a vehicle using the GMT400 platform, shared with the fourth-generation C/K pickup trucks; officially, the Chevrolet Suburban uses the GMT410 model code and the GMC Suburban is the GMT425. The 131.5-inch wheelbase of the Suburban is shared with regular-cab, long-bed C/K pickup trucks. As with the previous generation, the model line was offered in 1500 (½-ton) and 2500 (¾-ton) payload series.

In a first for the model line, independent front suspension was offered for both C-series and K-series Suburbans. While rear-wheel drive units again used front coil springs, 4x4 examples moved from a leaf-sprung solid front axle to an unequal-length control-arm front suspension with torsion bars. The rear axles in all versions used a leaf-sprung solid rear axle. Ground clearance was 6.9 inches (175 mm), the approach angle was 18 degrees for the K1500 (28 degrees for the K2500), and the break-over angle was 18 degrees.

==== Powertrain details ====
Through its production, the standard engine for the GMT400 Suburban was a 5.7L V8; initially offered as a L05, the Vortec 5700 L31 replaced it. For 2500-series vehicles, the 7.4L L19 was an option, becoming the Vortec 7400 L29.

After dropping the 6.2L V8 for 1992, the Suburban did not offer a diesel engine until 1994, when the turbocharged 6.5L V8 was introduced as its replacement. Initially offered only on 2500-series Suburbans (as an alternative to the 7.4L V8), the turbodiesel V8 became an option for 1500-series vehicles for 1995. Heavily derived from the 2500, 6.5L 1500s shared their heavier-duty frame with the 2500 and were fitted with a 14-bolt axle and eight-bolt wheels wearing LT-rated tires. The primary difference was a derated GVWR: from 8600 lbs to 7700 lbs (on C1500 diesels) and to 8050 lbs (on K1500 diesels).

The first Suburban offered solely with automatic transmissions, the 1500-series used the 4L60 four-speed automatic; the heavier-duty 4L80 four-speed automatic was used for 2500-series vehicles and 1500s with diesel engines.

=== Body ===
Again sharing its front bodywork with the C/K pickup trucks, the eighth-generation Suburban followed its predecessor in deriving its bodywork from the crew-cab pickup truck. The model line also shared its rear bodywork with the full-size Blazer (GMC renamed its full-size Jimmy as the Yukon), with enlarged side glass extending to the roof and black-painted D-pillars. Alongside the traditional twin-panel rear doors, the model line was offered with a split rear tailgate (replacing the retractable rear window with a lifting rear window and rear windshield wiper).

The interior was offered with multiple seating configurations, primarily dependent on trim. Standard with a 3-passenger front bench seat (with an optional 2-passenger configuration), the model line offered two optional rear bench seats (for up to 9 passengers).

=== Trim ===
For 1992, the Chevrolet Suburban followed the trims of the C/K pickup, offered in Cheyenne and Silverado trim (no midlevel Scottsdale trim was offered). The GMC Suburban followed suit with the Sierra pickup, offered in base SL, SLX, and flagship SLE trim.

In 1995, Chevrolet adopted a separate nomenclature for the Suburban from the C/K line, with an unnamed base trim closer in line to the Chevrolet W/T (oriented towards fleet sales), replacing the Cheyenne with the Silverado split into LS (cloth upholstery, front bench seat) and LT (leather upholstery, front bucket seats). GMC added a range-topping SLT trim, featuring standard leather upholstery among other luxury features.

== Model history ==
Beginning in 1994, GM began making numerous annual changes to the Suburban, including:

- Revised front clip and center stop lamp (1994)
- Revised interior including a driver-side air bag, revised side mirrors, Silverado trim split into LS and LT (1995)
- Revised 350 cu in (5.7 L) Vortec 5700 and 454 cu in (7.4 L) Vortec 7400 engines with increased power and fuel efficiency, electronic 4WD shifting, daytime running lights, illuminated entry, and some new interior features (1996)
- Revised transmissions, improved steering system, and added passenger-side airbag (1997)
- OnStar, PassLock security system and full-time AutoTrac 4WD option added, next-generation "depowered" air bags, revised steering wheel, transmissions revised again (1998)
- No major changes upon introduction of redesigned 2000 models (1999)
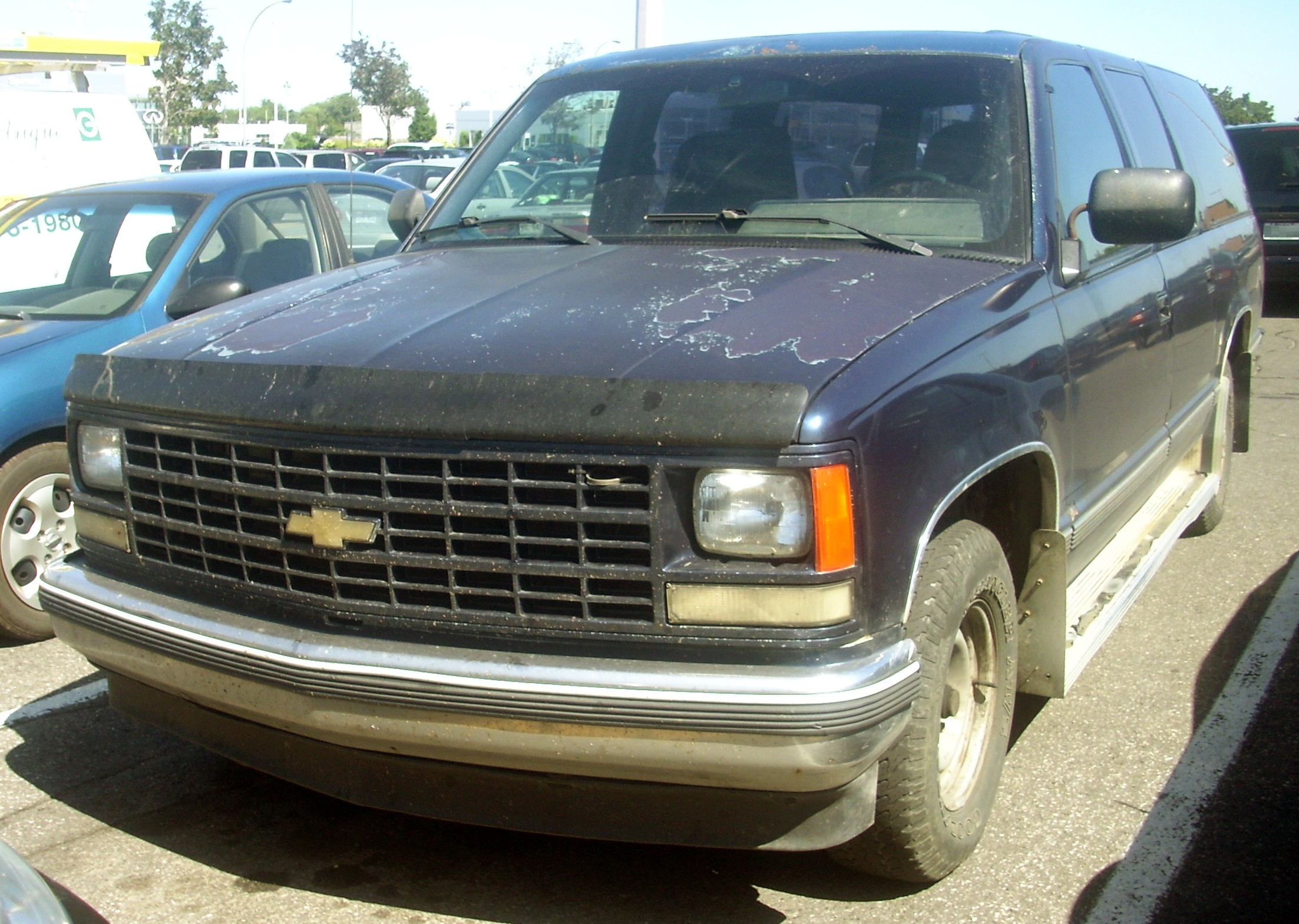
1992–1993 Chevrolet Suburban (base trim)

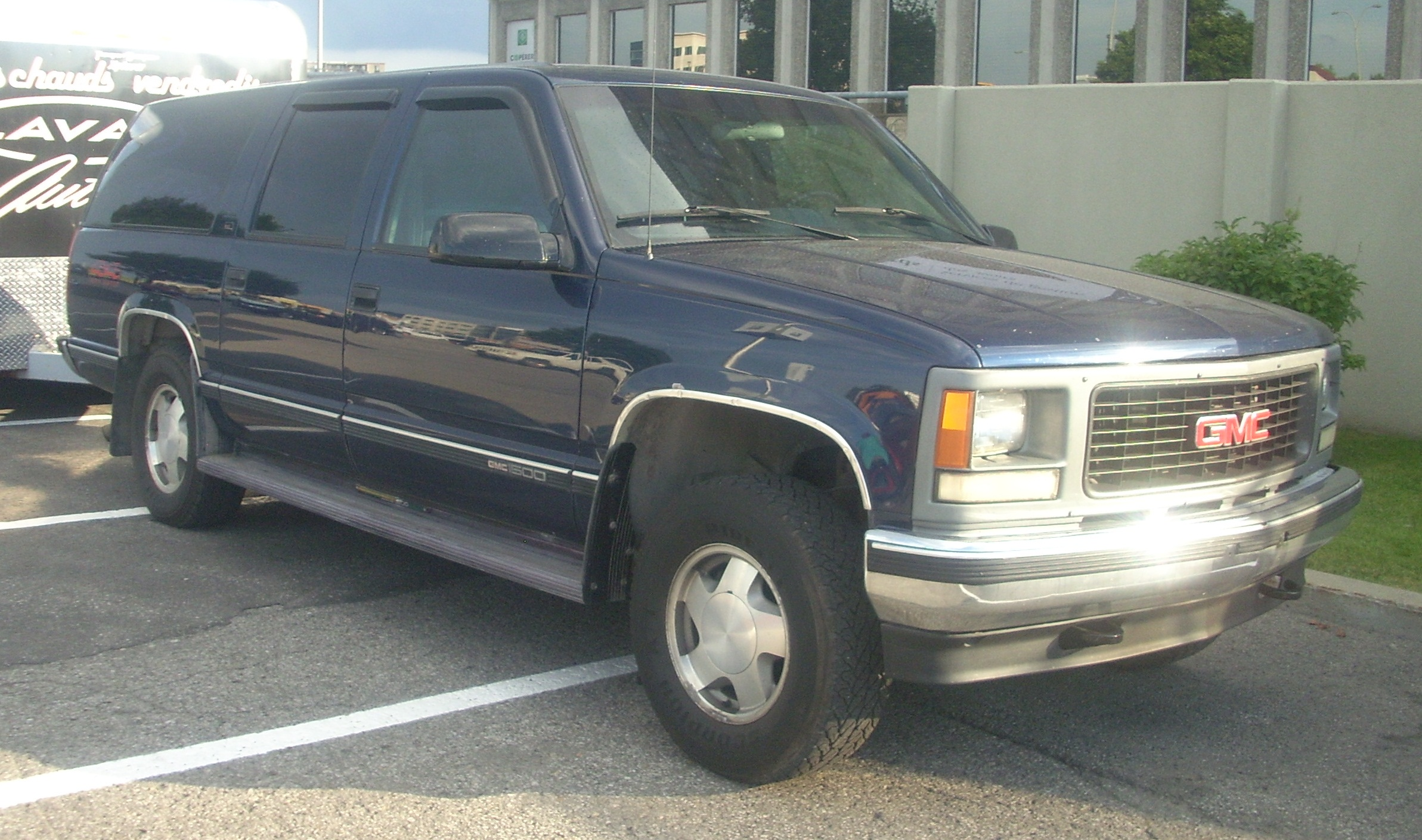
1992–1993 GMC Suburban (SL/Base Trim)

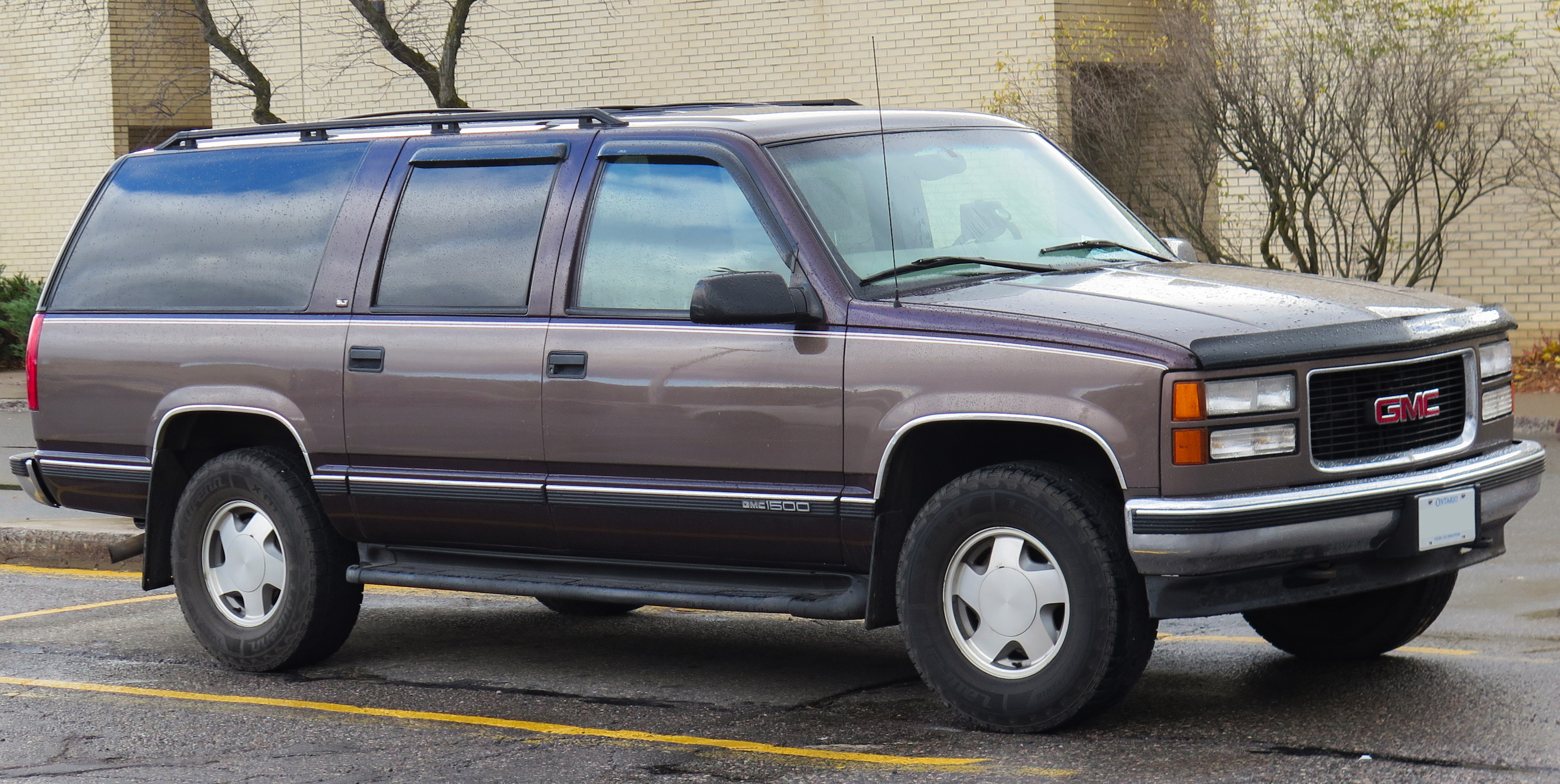
1997–1999 GMC Suburban SLT (1/2-ton)

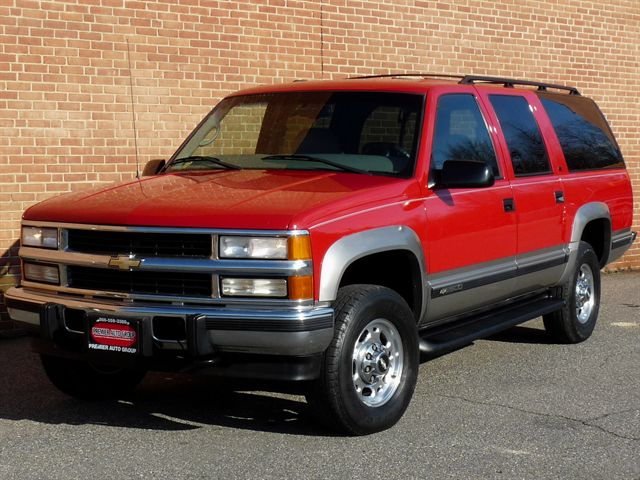
1997–1999 Chevrolet Suburban K2500 (LT trim, diesel)

== Holden Suburban (K8; 1998-2001) ==
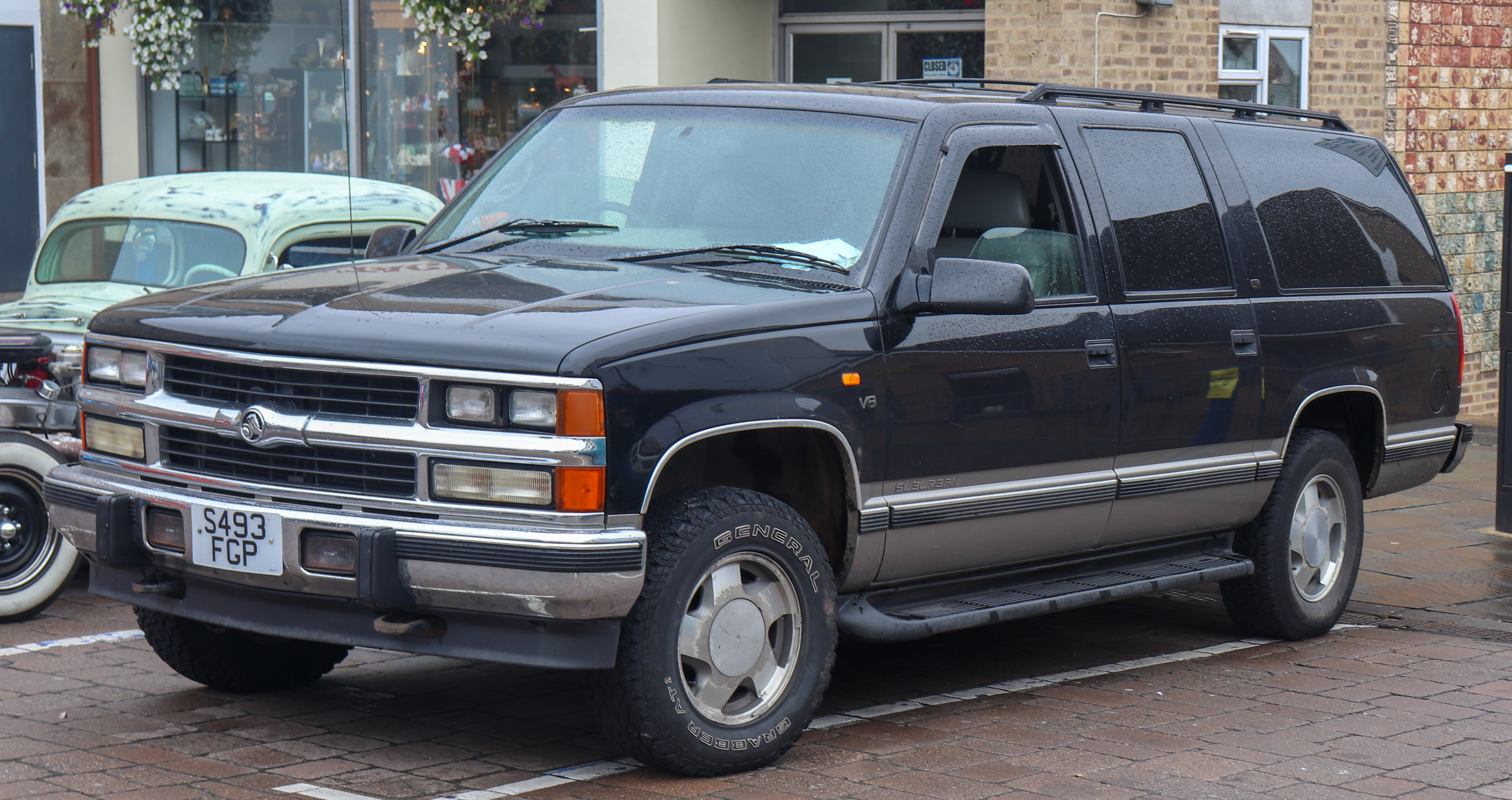
Holden Suburban (K8) 1500, New Zealand model

In Australia and New Zealand, Holden imported the right-hand-drive Chevrolet Suburban built by GM in Silao, Mexico, between February 1998 and January 2001. The Suburban was first previewed in October 1997 at the Sydney Motor Show. In total, 746 were sold (460 petrol and 286 diesel). After 2001, subsequent models reverted to the original Chevrolet brand, which had also been used before 1998. Over the model's lifetime there were three trim levels: a base model, the LS and the LT. Not to be confused with the trim variants is the model code, designated K8.

The Holden's interior differed from that of the American version, as the right-hand drive dashboard of the Blazer was used instead. However, it had to be stretched on the passenger (left) side to fit in the larger Suburban. A bench seat came standard on the entry-level variant as well as the LS, but the more expensive LT received bucket seats. With the omission of the center seat, the LT has a maximum seating capacity of eight, compared to nine.

Creature comforts standard in all models included a LCD compass in the rear-view mirror, a tilt adjustable steering wheel, a driver's airbag, ABS brakes, and dual-zone air conditioning. The second tier LS brought alloy wheels, power windows and mirrors among some features. To further up the ante, the LT gained electric front seats, leather trim, and a horizontally slated, two-part tailgate. This came as opposed to the "barn doors" found on the other specifications.

The Suburban was offered with the choice of either a 5.7-liter Vortec V8, producing 190 kW (255 hp; 258 PS) and 447 N⋅m (330 lb⋅ft; 46 kg⋅m) of torque, or a 6.5-liter turbodiesel V8 outputting 145 kW (194 hp; 197 PS) and 583 N⋅m (430 lb⋅ft; 59 kg⋅m). The former choice was designated the "1500" name, while the turbodiesel saw the "2500" name. The 5.7-liter petrol engine is LPG-compatible, and such systems can be retrofitted if desired. Regardless of the engine specified, the truck was equipped with a four-speed automatic transmission. However, what differed was the type of transmission. Petrol motors were fitted with the GM 4L60-E transmission, with the GM 4L80-E reserved for the diesel. A dashboard switch allows the vehicle to power all four wheels simultaneously, or the rear wheels only, and allows the low range gearing to be engaged.

The vehicle's fuel efficiency has been rated at 19.7 L/100 km (14.3 mpg_{‑imp}; 11.9 mpg_{‑US}) for the diesel specification, with that figure rising to 21.8 L/100 km (13.0 mpg_{‑imp}; 10.8 mpg_{‑US}) for the petrol model. With the hefty fuel consumption comes a 159-litre (35 imp gal; 42 US gal) fuel tank.

To combat the extra payload and towing capacity of the diesel, an improved braking package, as well as super heavy duty axles and suspension were fitted. Holden recommends a maximum 3,400 kilograms (7,500 lb) towing limit for the turbo diesels, with a reduced figure of 2,720 kilograms (6,000 lb) for the petrol models.

The Holden Suburban's run wasn't the first or only time that Holden had sold the GMT400 platform in Oceania. Beginning in 1996, they imported GMC C/Ks for ambulance conversions. Unlike the Suburbans, these vehicles were not available to the general public, nor did they bear Holden badging. They also were not built as right-hand-drives from the factory like the Suburban was; the same company that handled the ambulance conversion (Jakab Ambulance in Tamworth) also switched the steering to the other side.
