= General Motors de México =

Mexico's division of General Motors

- Type: Subsidiary
- Industry: Automotive
- Founded: 23 September 1935; 90 years ago
- Headquarters: Mexico City, Mexico
- Products: Automobiles; Pickups; Trucks
- Brands: Buick; Cadillac; Chevrolet; GMC; List: Former brands: Hummer; LaSalle; Oldsmobile; Opel (as Chevrolet); Pontiac; Saab; Saturn
- Parent: General Motors
- Website: gm.com.mx

General Motors de México, S.A. de C.V. is the Mexican subsidiary of the US-based company General Motors. Currently in Mexico, it is one of the largest production plants of the United States conglomerate outside its territory.

It has 4 production plants, two storage facilities and a wide network of concessionaires throughout Mexico for its work.

== History ==
In June 1911, the General Motors Export Company was founded in the United States, as a subsidiary of General Motors that had been established in 1908 thanks to the efforts of William C. Durant. Almost immediately, the new organization began market studies in other countries of the world. Its first official representative went to Australia; the second to Mexico in 1912.

In 1935, the General Motors Overseas Operations (GMOO) division determined the type of ideal operations to satisfy the growing demand of the Mexican market and announced the construction of a truck assembly plant in Mexico City. On September 23 of the same year, the company General Motors de México S.A. was legally incorporated. Until before the founding of the company and the construction of GM's first plant in Mexico, vehicles arrived from the United States fully armed. They were sent by rail through Laredo and Ciudad Juárez, or by sea freight to the ports of Veracruz and Tampico, from where they were in turn transported by rail. In the country, only some details were installed such as lenses, windshield wipers and certain ornaments.

In order to build the first assembly plant, a 44,000-square-meter piece of land was acquired on what is now Avenida Ejército Nacional, and which at that time was called Calzada de los Morales. GMM began its activities of direct sales to distributors who had been marketing the brands Cadillac, Pontiac, LaSalle, Chevrolet, etc. In February 1936, the company organized its first automobile exhibition, including a LaSalle convertible and a 1936 Chevrolet Sedan, which was the first automobile made entirely of sheet steel, completely discarding the wood from the structure of its bodywork. On 16 April of that year, the then regent of the Central Department (later the Federal District Department, today the Government of Mexico City) Cosme Hinojosa presided over the ceremony of laying the first stone of the plant. Five months later the building was completed with a 9,300 square meter roofed area.

Ninety days after the inauguration, on 18 January 1937, the first Chevrolet truck assembled in Mexico left the assembly line; the plant already had 222 workers and had a production capacity of ten units per day. The union and GMM signed their first collective contract in March, the salary was $4.00 pesos per day for unskilled workers.

After more than thirty years of assembly work, in 1965 production began in the new forging, foundry and engine production plant of General Motors de México; which is located in Toluca.

Subsequently, in 1979, GM in Mexico produced its 50,000th vehicle, thus accounting for the highest number of cars manufactured in its plants, thereby setting a new record that surpasses the previous one (of 49,424 units) in 1978. On the second visit from Pope John Paul II to Mexico, General Motors de México provided the official vehicle of the procession, the famous Popemobile, which was made on the basis of a white and a red Chevrolet Cheyenne pickup, specially adapted for safety and security requirements. displacement of the prelao.

== Production plants ==
At the beginning, the first and only production plant was that of the Federal District, where and since 1935, plastic parts and some of the steel sheet stampings have been manufactured for the production of bowtie brand cars and others.

- Toluca (1965)
- Ramos Arizpe (1981)
- Silao (1995)
- San Luis Potosí (2008)

== Brands ==
The main brands marketed in the Mexican market are Chevrolet, GMC, Buick and Cadillac.

Previously, brands such as Pontiac, Hummer, LaSalle, Saab, Saturn, Oldsmobile and Opel (under the Chevrolet brand), in addition to Fiat, which for a short period was imported into Mexico by the company, were part of GM's product portfolio in Mexico until its disappearance after the restructuring of the General Motors Corporation after the crisis of 2008, or its commercialization in the country has been suspended for strategic reasons.
