= Lotus Eletre =

Mid-size luxury crossover SUV

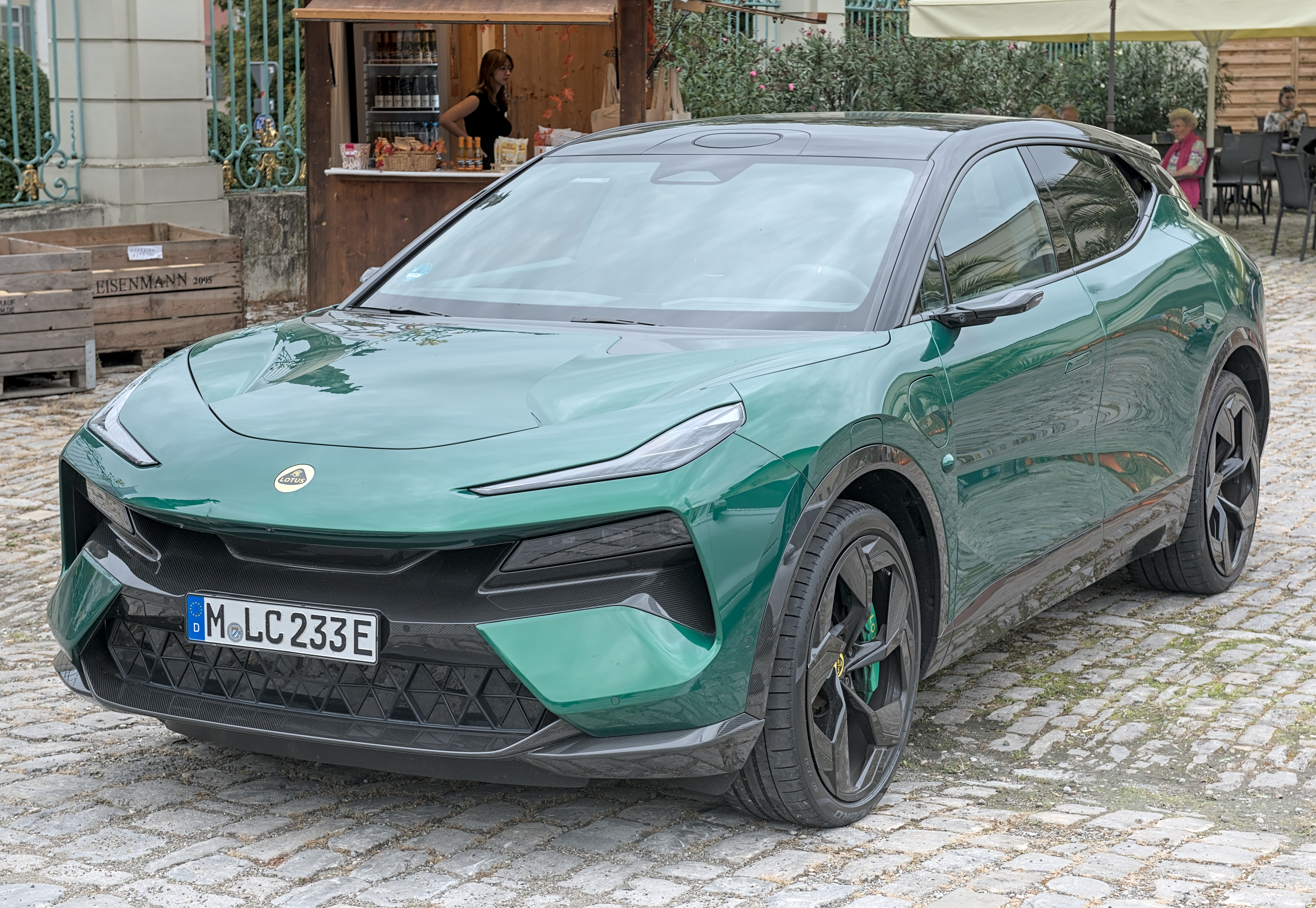

Overview
- Manufacturer: Lotus Cars
- Also called: Lotus NYO Eletre (China, 2022–2024); Lotus For Me (China, PHEV, 2026–present)
- Production: 2022–present
- Assembly: China: Wuhan, Hubei (Wuhan Lotus Technology)
- Designer: Ben Payne

Body and chassis
- Class: Mid-size luxury crossover SUV
- Body style: 5-door coupe SUV
- Layout: Dual-motor, all-wheel-drive (Eletre); Front-engine, dual-motor, all-wheel-drive (PHEV)
- Platform: SEA-S (Eletre); SEA-R (PHEV)
- Related: Lotus Emeya

Powertrain
- Engine: Petrol plug-in hybrid: 2.0 L DHE20-PFZ turbocharged I4
- Electric motor: 2× Permanent Magnet Synchronous motors
- Power output: 450 kW (610 PS; 600 hp); 675 kW (918 PS; 905 hp) (R-series); 710 kW (970 PS; 950 hp) (PHEV)
- Hybrid drivetrain: Plug-in hybrid (PHEV)
- Battery: 107/112 (usable/total) kWh LiPo (Eletre); 70 kWh CATL ternary NMC (PHEV)
- Range: 304–373 mi (489–600 km) (WLTP)
- Electric range: 214–221 mi (344–356 km) (PHEV, CLTC)
- Plug-in charging: 800 V, 430kW DC or 22kW AC

Dimensions
- Wheelbase: 3,019 mm (118.9 in)
- Length: 5,103 mm (200.9 in)
- Width: 2,019 mm (79.5 in) (PHEV); 2,135 mm (84.1 in) (with side camera mirrors); 2,231 mm (87.8 in) (with conventional mirrors)
- Height: 1,630 mm (64.2 in); 1,636 mm (64.4 in) (PHEV)
- Kerb weight: 2,545–2,690 kg (5,611–5,930 lb); 2,575–2,625 kg (5,677–5,787 lb) (PHEV)

Lotus Eletre
- Traditional Chinese: 蓮花 Eletre
- Simplified Chinese: 莲花 Eletre
Transcriptions
Standard Mandarin
- Hanyu Pinyin: Liánhuā Eletre
Yue: Cantonese
- Yale Romanization: Lìhn fā Eletre

路特斯 Eletre (transliteration)
Transcriptions
Standard Mandarin
- Hanyu Pinyin: Lùtèsī Eletre
Yue: Cantonese
- Yale Romanization: Louh dahk sī Eletre

The Lotus Eletre is a battery electric mid-size luxury crossover SUV produced by the British sports car manufacturer Lotus Cars. It was revealed on 29 March 2022 as the company's first production SUV and its first vehicle produced in China. The name of the car is derived from the Hungarian word "életre" which means "(coming) to life".

== Overview ==
Conceived by Jean-Marc Gales, Lotus's CEO at the time, the Lotus SUV project originally surfaced in 2016. Prior to this project, Lotus had revealed the 2006 Lotus APX concept crossover SUV, the first SUV that the company had built. In 2020, it was revealed that the internal codename for the new SUV project was 'Lambda' and that the model would be revealed in 2022. Later in 2021, teasers for the SUV were released and the 'Type 132' codename for the model was revealed. In February 2022, Lotus showed more teasers and revealed that the SUV would debut on 29 March 2022.

Ahead of its official debut, 3D patents published by the intellectual property office on 8 March revealed the Lotus Type 132, showing the SUV's coupe-like design. Later that month, the final production name of Type 132 was revealed to be 'Eletre', consistent with the other mass-production Lotus model nameplates which all begin with the letter 'E'.

The Lotus Eletre was designed at the Lotus Tech Creative Centre in West Midlands, England and is produced in Wuhan, China.

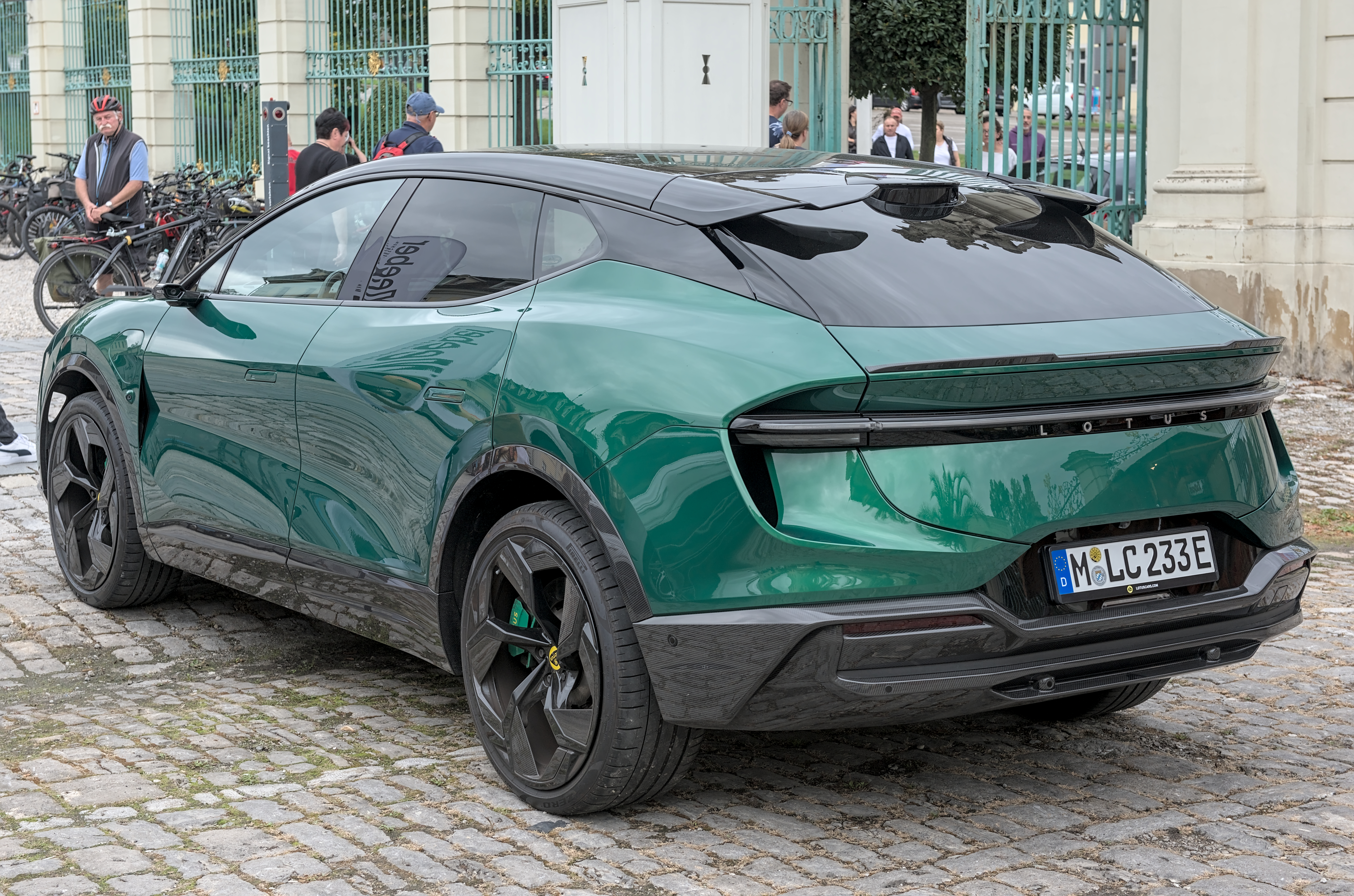
Rear view

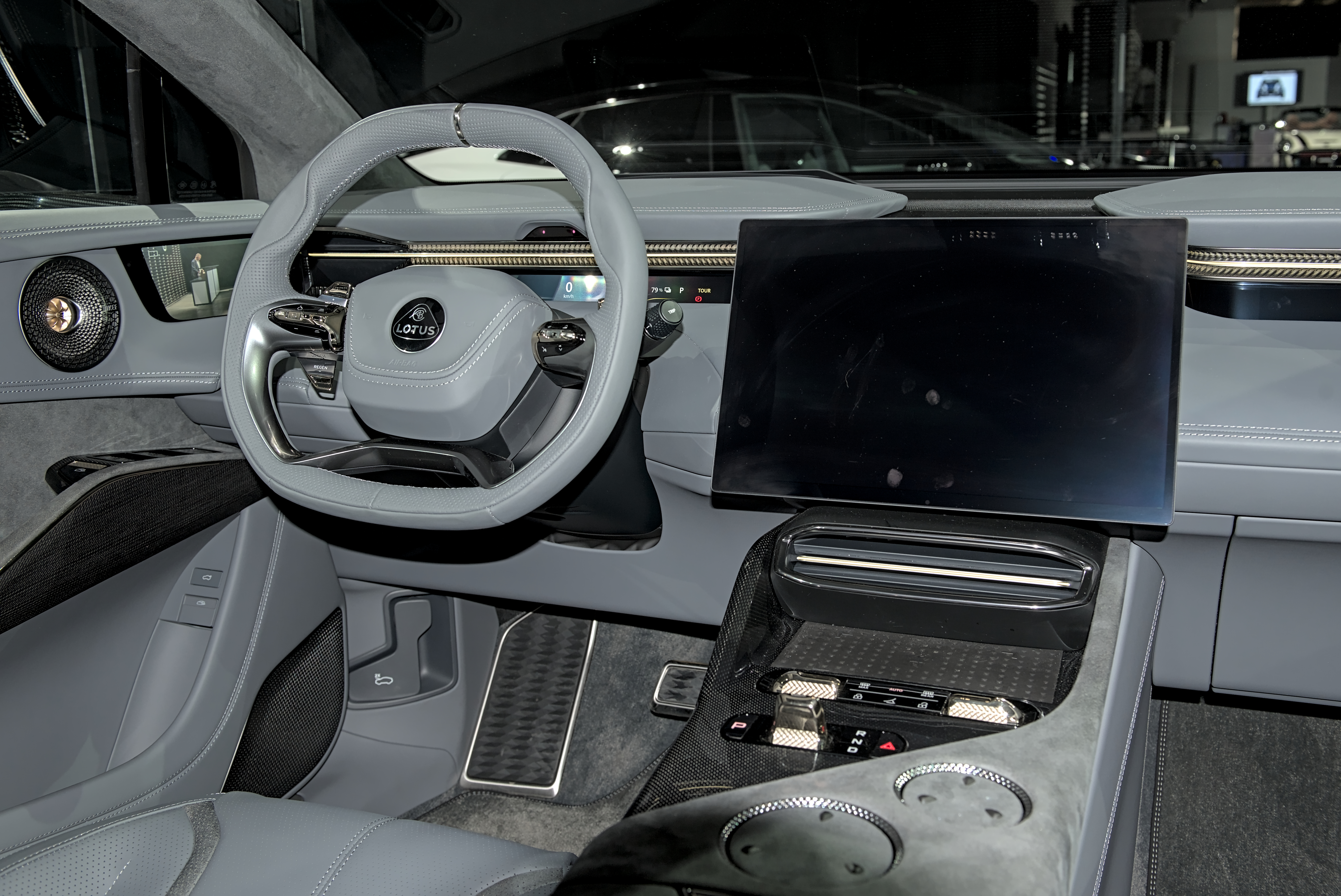
Interior

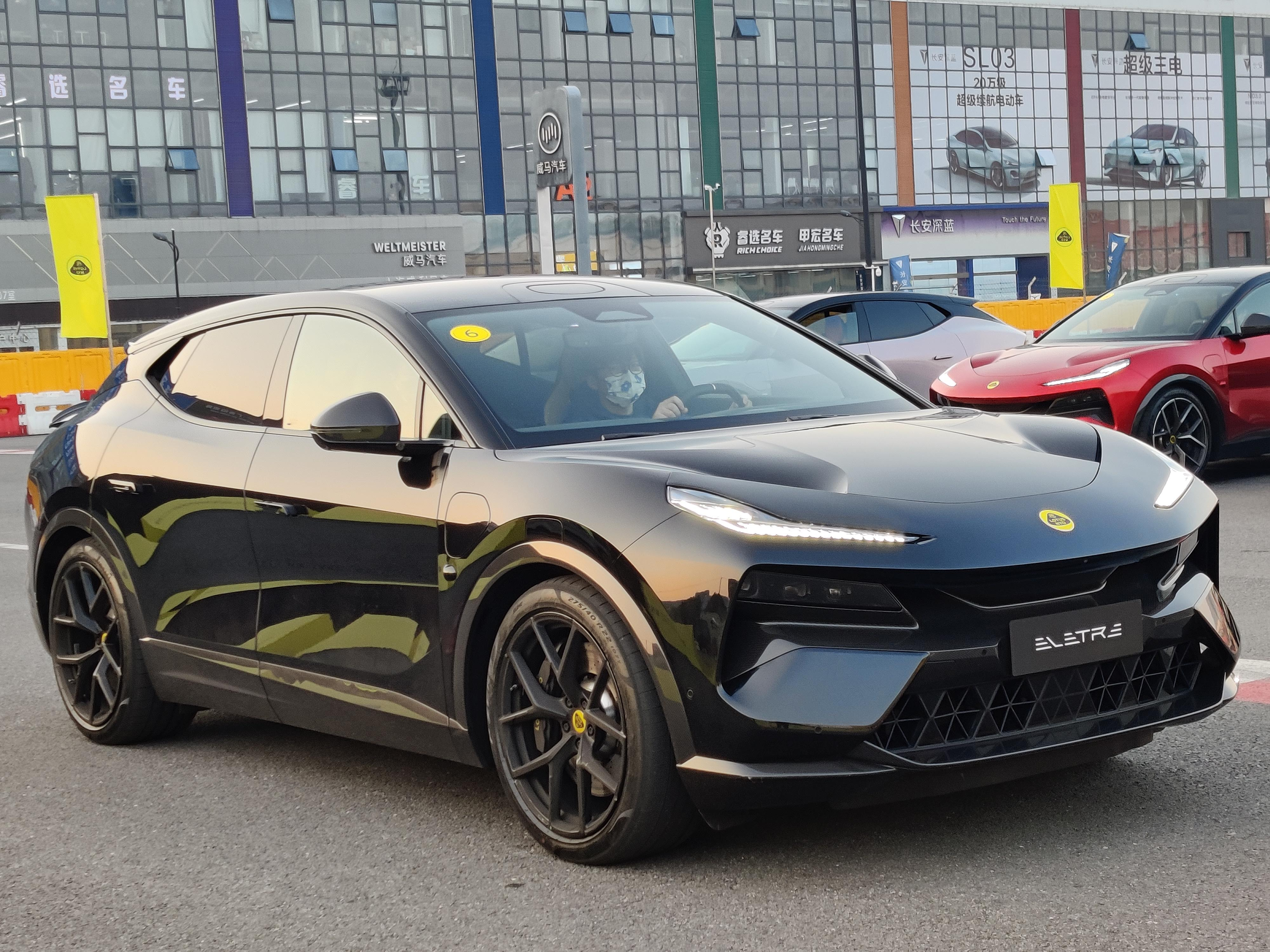
Lotus NYO Eletre

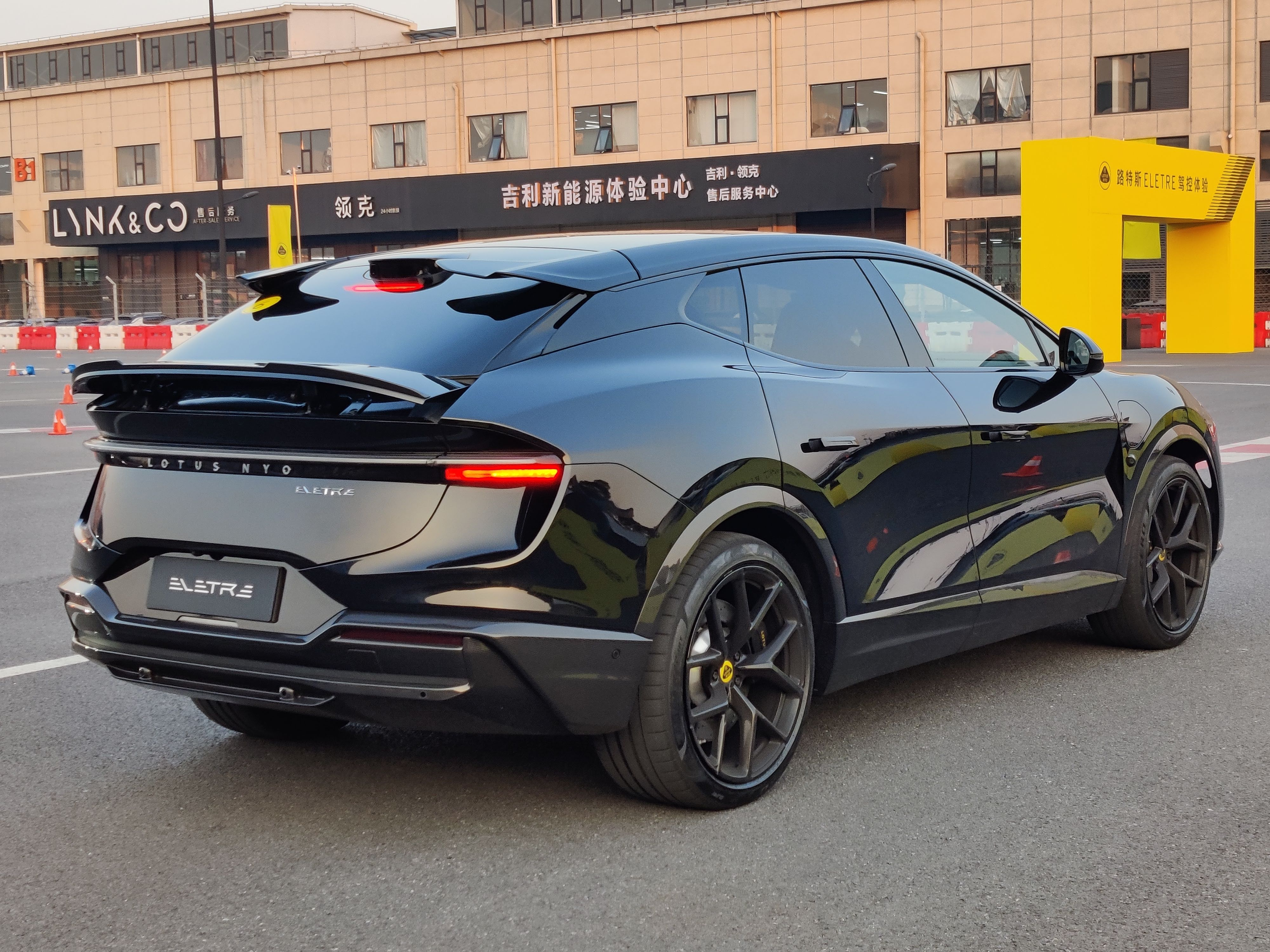
Rear view

== Lotus Eletre X ==
The Lotus Eletre X is the plug-in hybrid (PHEV) version of the Eletre and is now available in Europe. It produces up to 952 horsepower (710 kW; 965 PS) and will use a 2 liter turbocharged inline 4 generator engine producing 279 horsepower (208 kW; 283 PS), which is not powering the wheels during the normal daily driving, but the ICE engine can be connected to the front wheels (via clutch and single-speed gearbox) at speeds over ~50 mph, in order to increase the highway driving efficiency. The car can function either as a series-hybrid vehicle (EREV) or as a parallel-hybrid vehicle. There is a 150 kW electric motor generator, which is keyed to the ICE crankshaft (layout which ensures that the combined peak horsepower is at least 550 kW, even when the battery is almost flat). It is lighter than the Eletre 900. As with the Eletre, it also features a retractable roof-mounted LiDAR sensor and driver focussed handling.

== Specifications ==
=== Battery and platform ===
The Eletre is based on the Lotus Premium Architecture for the company's future C-segment and E-segment electric models. After the Type 132, two more SUVs and a sports car are planned to be released.

For model year 2024, The Lotus Eletre is available in three trim levels: base, S, and R. All models are equipped with a 112.0-kilowatt-hour lithium-ion battery that supports charging speeds up to 350 kilowatts. The base and S trims feature a dual-motor powertrain producing 603 horsepower and 524 pound-feet of torque, while the range-topping R trim boasts a more powerful setup (with an uprated rear motor), generating 905 horsepower and 726 pound-feet of torque. The R version, furthermore, is equipped with a 2-speed gearbox for the rear motor. The Eletre R can reach 60 mph in 2.9 seconds.

=== Technology ===
In a teaser video released by Lotus, a LiDAR sensor is shown rising from the roof of the Lotus Eletre. Also shown through teasers are digital side mirrors and a floating infotainment system.

== Sales ==
Year	China
2023	2,929
2024	1,025
2025	1,333
