= Bharat Mobility Global Expo =

Biennial automotive and mobility technology show in India

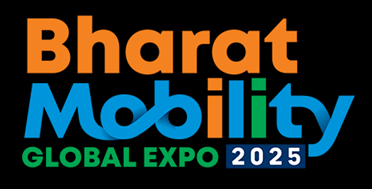
- Bharat Mobility Global Expo - 2025 Edition
- Status: Active
- Genre: Auto Show
- Frequency: Biennial
- Venue: New Delhi
- Country: India
- Years active: 1986–present
- Previous event: January 17, 2025 – January 22, 2025
- Next event: February 4, 2027 – February 9, 2027
- Organiser: ACMA; CII; SIAM
- Website: www.bharat-mobility.com

Old logo for Auto Expo 2020

The Bharat Mobility Global Expo, Previously called Auto Expo is a biennial event auto show held in Delhi NCR, India.

Till 2012, the Auto Expo was organized at Pragati Maidan, New Delhi which combined both vehicles and components. In 2014, The Auto Expo (Motor Show) moved to the new venue in NCR Region at the India Expo Mart, Greater Noida, Uttar Pradesh. However, The Auto Expo (Components) continued at the Pragati Maidan, New Delhi. Both the Motor Show and the Components are organized jointly by the Automotive Component Manufacturers Association (ACMA), Confederation of Indian Industry (CII) and Society of Indian Automobile Manufacturers (SIAM). After the opening of Bharat Mandapam in Pragati Maidan and Yashobhoomi in Dwarka, the expo returned to New Delhi with The Components Show being held at Yashobhoomi and The Motor Show being held at Bharat Mandapam.

In 2024, Auto Expo is renamed as Bharat Mobility Global Expo to align the show to reflect changing industry trends as well as greater participation of companies who are now playing major role in mobility and logistics as well as component manufacturing. Along with that, the show schedule is changed from biennial to annual event.

In October 2025, Autocar India reported that Bharat Mobility Global Expo will revert back to its biennial schedule with the 3rd edition of BMGE being held from February 4 to 9, 2027. Rajesh Agarwal, Additional Secretary, Ministry of Commerce, and Industry of India told the publication that the government was keen to make it an annual event but emphasized that suggestions and discussions from all stakeholders were essential to build a value proposition for everyone.

== History ==
=== Origin ===
The Auto Expo was conceived in the year 1985 and had its debut showcasing in 1986. The Auto Expo 1986 was a window for technology transfers showing how the Indian Automotive Industry was absorbing new technologies and promoting indigenous research and development for adapting these technologies for the rugged Indian conditions. The Auto Expo 1986 was marked by then Prime Minister Rajiv Gandhi. The 9 day show was organised from 3 to 11 January 1986 at Pragati Maidan, New Delhi.

== All editions ==
=== Bharat Mobility Global Expo 2025 ===
The 2nd Bharat Mobility Global Expo or The 17th edition of Auto Expo was hosted from 17 January to 22 January 2025 at Bharat Mandapam in New Delhi.

==== Participant Auto Manufacturers ====
- Ashok Leyland
- BMW
- BYD
- Cummins
- EKA Mobility
- Greaves Cotton
- Hero Motocorp
- Harley Davidson
- Honda
- Hyundai
- Isuzu
- JBM Auto
- Kia
- Maruti Suzuki
- Mahindra Automotive
- Mercedes-Benz
- MG Motor
- Ola Electric
- Omega Seiki Mobility
- Porsche
- Tata Motors
- SML Isuzu
- Toyota
- Lexus
- Škoda Auto
- Suzuki
- Switch Mobility
- VE Commercial Vehicles
- Volvo Buses
- Eicher Motors
- TVS Motor Company
- VinFast
- Vavye Mobility
- Yamaha Motor Company

==== Production Spec Cars ====
The production spec cars displayed during Auto Expo 2025:

- Punch CNG – Tata Motors
- Punch.ev – Tata Motors
- Harrier.ev – Tata Motors
- Carens – Kia
- Carens X-Line – Kia
- Carnival – Kia
- Dzire – Maruti Suzuki
- e Vitara – Maruti Suzuki
- Land Cruiser J300 – Toyota
- Carens – Kia
- Innova Hycross – Toyota
- Grand Vitara – Maruti Suzuki
- Fronx – Maruti Suzuki
- Jimny – Maruti Suzuki
- Brezza – Maruti Suzuki
- Invicto – Maruti Suzuki
- Urban Cruiser Hyryder – Toyota
- Ioniq 9 – Hyundai
- Ioniq 5 – Hyundai
- Creta Electric – Hyundai
- Nexo – Hyundai
- Staria – Hyundai
- Atto 3 – BYD
- Seal – BYD
- Sealion – BYD
- eMax 7 – BYD
- Seltos X Line – Kia
- Sonet X Line – Kia
- EV6 – Kia
- Seltos – Kia
- Sonet – Kia
- EV9 – Kia
- Syros – Kia
- Harrier Red Dark – Tata Motors
- Safari Red Dark – Tata Motors
- Hector – MG Motor
- M9 – MG Motor
- Cyberster – MG Motor
- Majestor – MG Motor
- ZS EV – MG Motor
- Hector Plus – MG Motor
- Camry – Toyota
- Fortuner – Toyota
- Fortuner Legender – Toyota
- Vellfire – Toyota
- bZ4X – Toyota
- Prius PHEV – Toyota
- Innova Hycross – Toyota
- RX 500h – Lexus
- RX 350h – Lexus
- LX 500d – Lexus
- LM 350 – Lexus
- Tiago.ev – Tata Motors
- Sierra – Tata Motors
- Tiago – Tata Motors
- Curvv – Tata Motors
- Safari – Tata Motors
- Elroq – Škoda Auto
- Kylaq – Škoda Auto
- Kodiaq – Škoda Auto
- Superb – Škoda Auto
- Kushaq – Škoda Auto
- Thar Roxx – Mahindra
- BE 6 – Mahindra
- XEV 9E – Mahindra
- VF7 – VinFast

=== Bharat Mobility Global Expo 2024 ===
The Bharat Mobility Global Expo 2024, previously known as the Auto Expo, was a global mobility exhibition held from February 1-3, 2024, in New Delhi at the Bharat Mandapam. It featured over 800 exhibitors from over 50 countries, showcasing technologies across the automotive value chain, and included exhibitions, conferences, and buyer-seller meets. Prime Minister Narendra Modi addressed the event, highlighting India's advancements in the mobility sector.

=== 16th Auto Expo 2023 ===
The 16th Auto Expo was held at the India Expo Mart in Greater Noida between 11 and 18 January 2023. The interaction days for the domestic and international media, were opened from 11 January to 12 January 2023. All the gates of the 2023 Auto Expo open from 11 am to 6 pm every day. The 2023 Auto Expo focuses on new auto technologies as well as innovation. The following brands took part in the event:

- Ashok Leyland
- Atul Auto
- Cummins
- Godawari Electric Motors
- Greaves Cotton
- Hexall Motors
- Hyundai
- JBM Auto
- Jupiter Electric Mobility
- Kia
- Maruti Suzuki
- MG Motor
- MTA E-Mobility
- Omega Seiki Mobility
- Tata Motors
- BYD Auto
- SML Isuzu
- Toyota
- Lexus
- Pravaig Dynamics
- Switch Mobility
- VE Commercial Vehicles
- Volvo Buses
- Eicher Motors
- Tork Motors
- TVS Motor Company

==== Concept cars ====
The concept cars displayed during Auto Expo 2023:

- eVX – Maruti Suzuki
- Hilux Extreme Off-Road – Toyota
- EV9 – Kia
- Curvv – Tata Motors
- Avinya – Tata Motors
- Sierra.ev – Tata Motors
- Harrier.ev – Tata Motors
- LF-30 – Lexus
- LFZ – Lexus
- Glanza Racing – Toyota

==== Production Spec Cars ====
The production spec cars displayed during Auto Expo 2023:

- Punch CNG – Tata Motors
- Altroz CNG – Tata Motors
- Altroz Racer – Tata Motors
- Carens Police Car – Kia
- Carens Ambulance – Kia
- KA4 (Carnival) – Kia
- Fronx – Maruti Suzuki
- Jimny – Maruti Suzuki
- Land Cruiser J300 – Toyota
- Carens – Kia
- Innova Hycross – Toyota
- Grand Vitara – Maruti Suzuki
- Brezza – Maruti Suzuki
- Ertiga – Maruti Suzuki
- Baleno – Maruti Suzuki
- WagonR Flex Fuel – Maruti Suzuki
- Urban Cruiser Hyryder – Toyota
- Ioniq 6 – Hyundai
- Ioniq 5 – Hyundai
- Alcazar – Hyundai
- Nexo – Hyundai
- Tucson – Hyundai
- Atto 3 – BYD
- Seal – BYD
- e6 – BYD
- Seltos X Line – Kia
- Sonet X Line – Kia
- EV6 – Kia
- Seltos – Kia
- Sonet – Kia
- Harrier Red Dark – Tata Motors
- Safari Red Dark – Tata Motors
- Hector – MG Motor
- Mifa 9 – MG Motor
- Astor – MG Motor
- Gloster – MG Motor
- ZS EV – MG Motor
- Marvel R – MG Motor
- Hector Plus – MG Motor
- eMG6 – MG Motor
- eHS – MG Motor
- MG4 – MG Motor
- MG5 – MG Motor
- Euniq 7 – MG Motor
- eRX5 – MG Motor
- Camry – Toyota
- Fortuner – Toyota
- Fortuner Legender – Toyota
- Vellfire – Toyota
- bZ4X – Toyota
- Mirai – Toyota
- RX 500h – Lexus
- RX 350h – Lexus
- LX 500d – Lexus
- LM 350 – Lexus
- Tiago.ev – Tata Motors
- Tiago.ev Blitz – Tata Motors

=== 15th Auto Expo 2020 ===
The 15th Auto Expo was held at the India Expo Mart in Greater Noida between 7 and 12 February 2020. The interaction days for the domestic and international media, were opened from 5 February to 6 February 2020. All the gates of the 2020 Auto Expo open from 11 am to 6 pm every day. The 2020 Auto Expo focuses on new auto technologies as well as innovation. The following brands took part in the event:

- Force Motors
- Great Wall Motors and Haval
- Haima Automobile
- Hyundai
- Kia Motors
- Mahindra
- Maruti Suzuki
- Mercedes-Benz
- MG Motor
- Renault
- Škoda Auto
- Tata Motors
- Volkswagen
- Omega Seiki Mobility

Due to a slow down in the Indian motor industry, the organiser had considered postponing the show to 2021. Several manufacturers declined to take part including BMW, Fiat, Ford, Honda and Toyota.

==== Concept cars ====
The concept cars displayed during Auto Expo 2020:

- Futuro E – Maruti Suzuki
- Funster – Mahindra
- XUV300 EV – Mahindra
- Le fil Rouge – Hyundai
- Sonet – Kia Motors
- Marvel X – MG Motor
- Vision I – MG Motor
- ID Crozz – Volkswagen
- Taigun – Volkswagen (Pre-Production)
- Vision IN – Škoda
- Sierra – Tata Motors
- HBX – Tata Motors(Pre-Production)
- Kite – Hyundai
- RS 2027 – Renault
- SYMBIOZ – Renault
- Concept H – GWM Haval
- Vision 2025 – GWM Haval

==== Production Spec Cars ====
The production spec cars displayed during Auto Expo 2020:

- F7 – GWM Haval
- F7X – GWM Haval
- F5 – GWM Haval
- H9 – GWM Haval
- Ora R1 – GWM
- IQ – GWM
- New Creta – Hyundai
- Tucson Facelift – Hyundai
- I30 Fastback N – Hyundai
- Hector Plus – MG Motor
- Gloster – MG Motor
- G10 – MG Motor
- Carnival – Kia Motors
- X Ceed – Kia Motors
- Stonic – Kia Motors
- E Niro – Kia Motors
- Soul EV – Kia Motors
- Vitara Brezza Facelift – Maruti Suzuki
- Ignis Facelift – Maruti Suzuki
- Jimny – Maruti Suzuki
- Atom – Mahindra
- E KUV100 – Mahindra
- K-ZE – Renault
- Zoe EV – Renault
- Triber AMT – Renault
- Gravitas – Tata Motors
- New Winger – Tata Motors
- Altroz EV – Tata Motors
- Hexa Safari Edition – Tata Motors
- Tiguan All-Space – Volkswagen
- T-Roc – Volkswagen
- Superb Facelift – Škoda
- Karoq – Škoda
- 7X – Haima
- 8S – Haima
- Bird E1 – Haima

=== 14th Auto Expo 2018 ===
The 14th Auto Expo, the biggest event of the automotive industry in India, was held from 9–14 February 2018.

Like the previous edition, this show is divided into:

- Auto Expo 2018 – The Motor Show: scheduled from 9–14 February 2018 (at India Expo Mart, Greater Noida, Uttar Pradesh)
- Auto Expo 2018 – Components: scheduled from 8–11 February 2018 (at Pragati Maidan, New Delhi)

However, the joint inauguration of Auto Expo 2018 was held on 8 February.

==== Major Contributors ====
Among the major contributors to the EV segment, Tata is expected to launch two new electric cars, namely Tiago EV and Tigor EV. In addition to EVs, manufacturers like Tata Motors, Maruti Suzuki, Mahindra, BMW, Hyundai, etc. are expected to showcase their products.

==== Two Wheelers ====
In the two-wheelers segment, Hero MotoCorp is expected to offer a wide range of electric scooters, along with some new non-electric bikes. One can see major two-wheeler manufacturers like BMW, Honda, TVS, Kawasaki, Suzuki and UM Motorcycles to showcase the new products in their series.

==== Concept Cars ====
Maruti Suzuki has already announced the e-survivor and Future-S concepts to be showcased at Auto Expo 2018. Other concepts on display will be Trezor Concept and Concept EQ from Renault.

==== Driverless technology ====
Hi Tech Robotic Systems launched AI based driver state monitoring system technology called Novus Aware in partnership with Daimler India Commercial Vehicles (DICV) for their Bharat Benz Truck.

==== Not Participating ====
Those not taking part in the event include the likes of Volkswagen, Nissan, Bajaj and Royal Enfield, Datsun, Skoda, Volvo, Ford, Lamborghini, Porsche, Audi, Fiat, Jeep, Jaguar, Land-Rover. Two-wheeler majors Harley Davidson and Triumph and truck makers MAN and Scania. The major reasons cited for their non-participation are the non-availability of specific Indian models and the poor return on investments.

=== 13th Auto Expo 2016 ===
The Auto Expo 2016 or 13th Auto Expo. The Auto Expo is the biennial (once every two years) automotive show of India and second largest auto show of the world, held in the National Capital Region of Delhi.

This show was divided into:

- Auto Expo 2016 – The Motor Show: held from 5–9 February 2016 (at India Expo Mart, Greater Noida, Uttar Pradesh)
- Auto Expo 2016 – Components: held from 4–7 February 2016 (at Pragati Maidan, New Delhi)

==== Organisers ====
The Organisers of the Auto Expo 2016 were:

- Automotive Component Manufacturers Association of India (ACMA)
- Confederation of Indian Industry (CII)
- Society of Indian Automobile Manufacturers (SIAM)

The motor show received accreditation from the Organisation Internationale des Constructeurs d'Automobiles (OICA).

==== Exhibitors ====
The following brands have taken part in the Auto Expo 2016:

- Abarth
- Ashok Leyland
- Atul Auto
- Audi India
- Bird Retail Pvt. Ltd.
- BMW India
- Chevrolet
- Datsun
- DSK Motowheels Pvt Ltd
- Eicher Motors
- Executive Modcar Trendz
- FCA India Automobiles
- Force Motors
- Ford India
- Greenrick
- General Motors India Private Limited
- Hero MotoCorp
- Hindustan Petroleum
- Honda Cars India
- Honda Motorcycle and Scooter India (P) Ltd.
- Hyundai Motor India Limited
- India Yamaha Motor
- Indian Motocycle Manufacturing Company
- Isuzu Motors India
- JBM Auto Ltd.
- Jaguar Land Rover
- Lohia Auto Industries
- Mahindra & Mahindra
- Maruti Suzuki
- Mercedes-Benz India
- Motormind Automotive Designs
- Nissan Motor India Private Limited
- Piaggio India
- Polaris India Pvt. Ltd.
- Renault India Private Limited
- Revolta Motors India
- Speedways Electric
- Scania Commercial Vehicles India Pvt. Ltd.
- SML Isuzu India
- Speego Vehicles India
- Suzuki India
- Tata Motors
- Toyota Kirloskar Motor
- Triumph Motorcycles India Pvt Ltd
- TVS Motor Company
- UM India Two Wheelers (P) ltd.
- VE Commercial Vehicles Pvt. Ltd.
- Volkswagen Group Sales India

=== Concept cars ===
The concept cars displayed during the Auto Expo 2016:

- Audi Prologue
- Chevrolet Cruze
- Chevrolet Spin
- Datsun Go-Cross
- Honda Accord
- Honda BR-V
- Hyundai Carlino
- Hyundai N 2025 Vision Gran Turismo
- Hyundai Tucson
- Isuzu D-Max V-cross
- Jeep Grand Cherokee
- Mahindra XUV Aero
- Maruti Suzuki Ignis
- Mercedes Benz GLC-Class
- Renault Duster Facelift
- Renault KWID AMT
- Tata Hexa
- Toyota Innova Crysta
- Toyota Prius
- Volkswagen Passat GTE
- Novus Drive by Hi Tech Robotic Systemz

==== Car launches ====
New cars launched at the 13th Auto Expo 2016:

- Audi R8 V10 Plus
- BMW X1 (F48)
- Jaguar XE
- Maruti Suzuki Vitara Brezza (Unveiled)

==== Two wheeler showcase ====
- Honda Navi
- Renegade Commando
- Renegade Sport S
- Renegade Classic
- Suzuki Gixxer SF FI
- Triumph Bonneville T120
- Yamaha MT-09

=== 12th Auto Expo 2014 ===
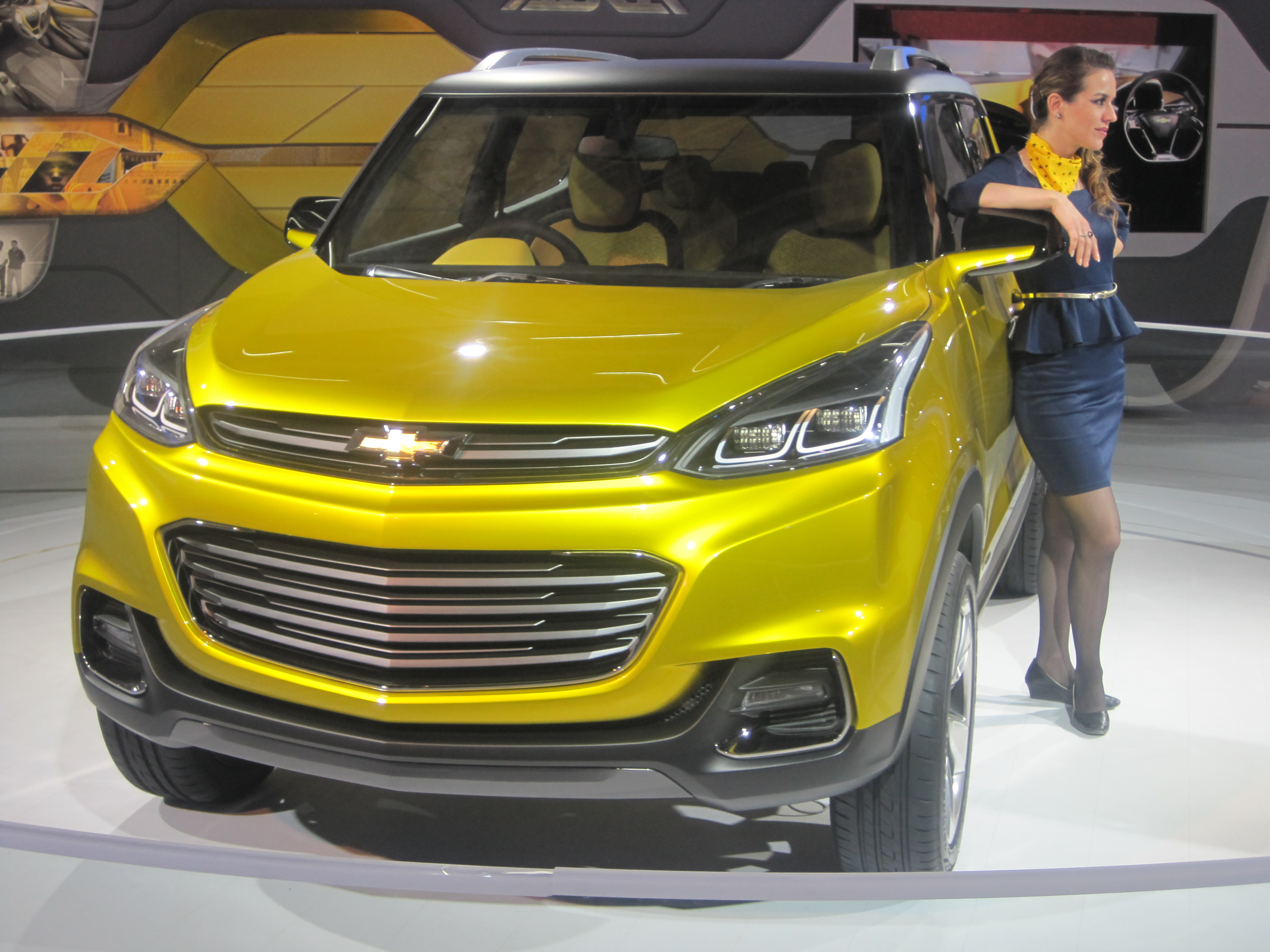
Chevrolet Compact SUV Adra, a concept car at 12th Auto Expo 2014 in Greater Noida.

The 12th Edition of the Auto Expo was divided into two events:

- 12th Auto Expo 2014 (Components) which was held at Pragati Maidan, New Delhi from 6 to 9 February 2014.
- 12th Auto Expo 2014 (The Motor Show) which was held at India Expo Mart, Greater Noida, Delhi-NCR from 7 to 11 February 2014, with press preview days on 5 and 6 February.

==== Production car launches ====
- Abarth 500 (Indian introduction)
- Ashok Leyland Dost Tipper
- Ashok Leyland MiTR
- Ashok Leyland Partner
- Audi A3 Cabriolet (Indian introduction)
- Audi A3 Sedan (Indian introduction)
- Bajaj RE60
- BMW 3 Series Gran Turismo (Indian introduction)
- BMW i8 (Indian introduction)
- BMW M6 Gran Coupe (Indian introduction)
- BMW X5 (Indian introduction)
- Chevrolet Beat facelift (Indian introduction)
- Chevrolet Camaro ZL1 (Indian introduction)
- Chevrolet Corvette Stingray (Indian introduction)
- Chevrolet TrailBlazer (Indian introduction)
- Datsun Go/Go+ (Indian introduction)
- DC Avanti
- Fiat Linea facelift (Indian introduction)
- Ford Fiesta facelift (Indian introduction)
- 2014 Ford Figo
- Honda Accord Hybrid (Indian introduction)
- Honda Jazz (Indian introduction)
- Honda Mobilio (Indian introduction)
- Hyundai Santa Fe (Indian introduction)
- Hyundai Xcent
- Isuzu D-MAX Space Cab (Indian introduction)
- Isuzu NHR (Indian introduction)
- Jaguar F-Type (Indian introduction)
- 2014 Jaguar XJ (Indian introduction)
- 2014 Land Rover Discovery (Indian introduction)
- Mahindra e2o with Quick2Charge
- Mahindra Loadking Zoom container
- Mahindra Quanto autoSHIFT
- Mahindra Torro 25
- Mahindra Tourister Cosmo 40 seater
- Maruti Celerio
- Maruti Swift Sport (Indian introduction)
- Maruti SX4 S-Cross (Indian introduction)
- Mercedes-Benz GLA-Class (Indian introduction)
- Mercedes-Benz M Guard (Indian introduction)
- Mercedes-Benz CLA 45 AMG (Indian introduction)
- MINI John Cooper Works (Indian introduction)
- Nissan Evalia facelift
- Nissan Sunny facelift
- Range Rover Long Wheelbase
- 2014 Range Rover Evoque with 9-speed AT (Indian introduction)
- Renault Duster Adventure Edition
- Renault Fluence facelift (Indian introduction)
- Renault Koleos facelift (Indian introduction)
- Renault Megane RS facelift (Indian introduction)
- Renault Zoe (Indian introduction)
- SsangYong Rodius (Indian introduction)
- SsangYong Rexton 2.0L (Indian introduction)
- Škoda Yeti facelift (Indian introduction)
- Tata Ace Zip XL
- Tata Bolt
- Tata LPS 4923 Lift Axle tractor
- Tata Prima CX 1618.T
- Tata Prima 4032.S LNG
- Tata Ultra 614
- Tata Starbus Urban FE Parallel Hybrid Bus
- Tata Starbus Urban 9/18 FE Articulated Bus
- Tata Zest
- Toyota Corolla Altis (Indian introduction)
- Toyota Etios Cross
- Toyota GT86 (Indian introduction)
- Toyota Hiace (Indian introduction)

==== Concept car launches ====
- Audi Sport quattro concept (Indian introduction)
- Bajaj U-Car
- Chevrolet Adra
- Datsun redi-GO
- Fiat Avventura
- Ford Figo sub-4 meter sedan
- Honda NSX (Indian introduction)
- Honda Vision XS-1
- Hyundai HND-9
- Jaguar C-X17 (Indian introduction)
- Mahindra eMaxximo EV
- Mahindra Halo EV
- Mahindra M1 Electro Formula E race car
- Mahindra Verito EV
- Mahindra XUV500 diesel hybrid
- Maruti Ciaz
- Maruti Swift Range Extender (Indian introduction)
- Nissan Friend-ME (Indian introduction)
- Nissan GT-R GT500 race car (Indian introduction)
- Piaggio NT3 concept (Indian introduction)
- Renault KWID
- SsangYong LIV-1 (Indian introduction)
- Tata ADDVenture
- Tata ConnectNext
- Tata Magic Iris Electric
- Tata Nano Twist Active
- Tata Nano Twist F-Tronic
- Tata Nexon
- Tata Safari Storme Ladakh
- Tata Sumo Extreme
- Volkswagen Taigun

==== Two Wheeler launches ====
- Aprilia Caponord 1200 (Indian introduction)
- Aprilia RSV4 R ABS (Indian introduction)
- Bajaj Pulsar SS400 and CS400
- DSK Hyosung Aquila 250
- DSK Hyosung GD 250N
- DSK Hyosung RT125 D
- Harley-Davidson Street 750 (Indian introduction)
- Hero Dare 125cc scooter
- Hero Hastur
- Hero iON Hydrogen-fuel cell vehicle concept
- Hero Passion Pro TR
- Hero SimplEcity electric bike
- Hero Splendor Pro Classic Cafe Racer
- Hero ZIR 150cc scooter
- Honda Activa 125
- Honda CBR 650F
- 2014 Honda CBR1000RR SP
- 2014 Honda CB Trigger
- Honda CX01 concept
- 2014 Honda Dream Yuga
- Mahindra Cafe Racer concept
- Mahindra Mojo
- Mahindra Scrambler concept
- Moto Morini Granpasso (Indian introduction)
- Moto Morini Scrambler (Indian introduction)
- Moto Guzzi California 1400 Touring (Indian introduction)
- 2014 Moto Guzzi V7 (Indian introduction)
- Piaggio Liberty 125 (Indian introduction)
- Rexnamo Electric SuperCruiser
- Suzuki Gixxer
- Suzuki Let's
- Suzuki V Strom 1000 ABS (Indian introduction)
- Terra A4000i electric scooter (Indian introduction)
- Terra Kiwami electric motorcycle
- Terra T4 electric riskshaw (Indian introduction)
- Triumph Daytona 675 (Indian introduction)
- TVS Draken concept
- TVS Graphite concept
- TVS Scooty Zest 110 cc scooter
- TVS Star City+
- TVS Wego
- UM Renegade Commando
- UM Renegade Sport
- UM XTreet
- Vardenchi T5
- Vespa 946 (Indian introduction)
- Vespa S (Indian introduction)
- Yamaha Alpha 110 cc scooter
- Yamaha FZ-S concept
- Yamaha R25 concept (Indian introduction)
- Yamaha YZF-R15 Special Edition

=== 11th Auto Expo 2012 ===
The 11th Edition of Auto Expo was held at Pragati Maidan, New Delhi from 5 to 11 January 2012. The first 2 days of the event was reserved for Media and VIPs. The formal inauguration happened on 6 January 2012 and the event was open to general public from 7 to 11 January 2012. The largest automotive show in India saw around 1500 participants from 23 countries.

The 11th Edition of Auto Expo saw 50 car launches, 10 of them were global launches and 20 two-wheeler launches. For the first time Ferrari and Peugeot showcased their line-up for India.

==== Production car launches ====
- Audi Q3
- Nissan NV200 or Evalia
- Volkswagen Beetle
- Mini Cooper
- Toyota Land Cruiser facelift
- Chevrolet Sail
- Toyota Camry facelift
- Chevrolet MPV
- Tata Safari Storme
- BMW M5
- Chevrolet Tavera Neo3
- Ford Fiesta next generation
- Hyundai Elantra facelift
- Hyundai Veloster coupe
- Jaguar XF facelift
- Jaguar XJ
- Jaguar XKR
- Ssangyong Rexton
- Ssangyong Korando
- Mahindra XUV500
- Suzuki Ertiga
- Mercedes-Benz SLS AMG Roadster
- Mercedes-Benz M-Class third Generation
- Mercedes S600 Pullman Guard
- Nissan GT-R
- Peugeot 508 Saloon
- Peugeot 3008 Crossover
- Peugeot RCZ Sports Coupe
- Renault Pulse
- Skoda Rapid
- Skoda Laura RS
- Volkswagen Touareg facelift

==== Concept car launches ====
- Ashok Leyland Stile Concept
- Audi A3 e-tron concept
- Bajaj RE60
- Ford Ecosport global launch
- Hyundai Hexa Space concept
- Jaguar C-X75
- Jaguar C-X16
- Land Rover DC-100
- Ssangyong Korando XIV Concept
- Ssangyong Korando Actyon Concept
- Mahindra Verito Electric
- Maruti Suzuki XA Alpha compact SUV
- Mercedes Benz concept A-Class
- Nissan Leaf
- Skoda RS2000 concept
- Skoda Fabia Monte Carlo
- Tata Manza Hybrid Concept
- Volkswagen XL1 concept

==== Two Wheeler launches ====
- Ducati Monster 795
- Hero MotoCorp Leap Concept
- Hero MotoCorp Igniter
- Hero MotoCorp Passion xPro
- Hero MotoCorp Maestro
- Honda CBR 1000R
- Honda VT 1300CX Fury
- Honda Dream Yuga
- Honda CBR 150R
- Honda CBR 250R
- Honda Dio facelift
- Piaggio Vespa
- Motto Guzzi
- Royal Enfield Thunderbird 500
- Suzuki Hayate
- Triumph Bonneville
- Triumph Street Triple
- TVS QUBE Concept
- TVS Radeon
- Yamaha Ray
- Yamaha YZF-R15

=== 10th Auto Expo 2010 ===
The Silver Jubilee edition of Auto Expo happened from 5 to 11 January 2010 witnessed nearly 72 launches. This included more than 10 global launches comprising passenger vehicles and two-wheelers.

The show was inaugurated by Mr Kamal Nath, Minister of Road Transport & Highways, Government of India and Mr Vilasrao Deshmukh, Minister of Heavy Industries and Public Enterprises. The show was also visited by media from over 19 countries.

==== Production and Concept car launches ====
- Volkswagen Polo
- Tata Aria
- Skoda Yeti
- Fiat Punto Trendz
- Jaguar XJ
- Honda Brio
- Toyota Etios Sedan and Hatchback
- Hyundai i10 electric concept
- Chevrolet Aveo CNG
- Chevrolet Beat
- Audi Q7
- Maruti Suzuki Kizashi
- Fiat Linea T-Jet
- Chevrolet Captiva Extreme
- Chevrolet e-Spark
- Maruti Eeco
- Mahindra Thar

==== Two Wheeler launches ====
- Honda CB Twister
- Hero Honda Karizma ZMR
- Kawasaki Ninja 250R
- TVS Wego
- Bajaj Pulsar 135
- Yamaha Fazer (India)
- TVS Apache RTR 180
- TVS Jive
- Royal Enfield Classic 350
- Bajaj Pulsar 220

=== 9th Auto Expo 2008 ===
9th Edition of Auto Expo saw the launch of the much awaited and eagerly anticipated Tata Nano. The expo happened from 10 to 17 January 2008, it attracted 1.8 million visitors and generated business worth Rs. 20,000 Crores through 2000 exhibitors and the display area was 1.2 Lakh square. The event had 65 manufacturers and more than 1,900 auto component makers. More than 31 new product / facelift and 4 global launches happened during the expo.

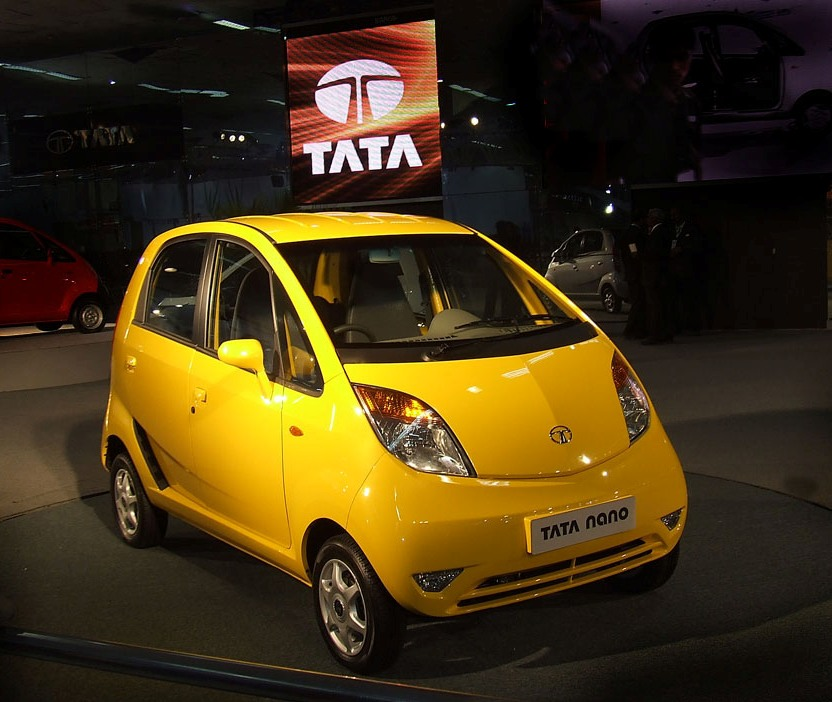
Tata Nano at the Auto Expo

==== Production/Concept Car Launches ====
- Tata Nano
- Chevrolet Captiva
- Mercedes C-Class
- Mercedes-Benz CLK-Class
- Audi A4
- Skoda Fabia
- Tata Sumo Grande
- Tata Indigo CS
- Tata Xenon
- Tata Indica Vista
- Volkswagen up! concept
- Volkswagen Jetta
- BMW M3 Coupe
- Bajaj small car concept
- Honda Jazz
- Honda Civic Hybrid
- Hyundai Santro LPG
- Maruti Ritz or Suzuki Splash
- Maruti Suzuki A-Star concept
- Chevrolet Adhra concept
- Mahindra Xylo
- Volvo S80
- Volvo XC60
- Volvo C70 Convertible

==== Two Wheeler launches ====
- Honda Aviator
- Honda Unicorn CBF Concept
- Honda CBR600RR
- Kawasaki Ninja 1000R

=== 8th Auto Expo 2006 ===
The 8th Auto Expo 2006 was organised at Pragati Maidan, New Delhi from 12 to 17 January 2006. With more than 1,000 participants, 300 overseas companies and 22 countries—including country-level participation from China, Germany, Italy, Taiwan and UK. The Expo covers an area of over 70,000 sq meters in New Delhi's Pragati Maidan. The Expo was jointly organized by the Automotive Components Manufacturers Association of India (ACMA), the Confederation of Indian Industry (CII), and the Society of Indian Automobile Manufacturers (SIAM).

=== Production/Concept Car Launches ===
- Mitsubishi Lancer Cedia
- Skoda Yeti Concept
- Skoda Superb
- Skoda Octavia RS
- Skoda Laura RS
- Honda FCX concept
- Honda CRV
- Honda Civic
- Honda City ZX CVT
- Mahindra Scorpio Hybrid
- Mahindra Bijilee Concept

=== 7th Auto Expo 2004 ===
7th edition of Auto Expo spanned for 5 days from 7 to 11 January 2004. The key OEM exhibitors were Maruti, Hyundai, Tata Motors, Nissan, Skoda, Audi, Volkswagen and Daimler Chrysler. The display area was 10,300 m^{2}.

=== 6th Auto Expo 2002 ===
The 6th edition of the Auto Expo was held from 15 to 22 January 2002. The show witnessed international participation from 20 countries and exhibitors from China, the Czech Republic, France, Greece, Germany, Israel, Iran, Japan, Korea, Malaysia, Russia, Spain, Sweden, Switzerland, Taiwan, the UAE and the USA.

==== Production/Concept Car Launches ====
- Fiat Palio
- Ashok Leyland Luxury buses
- Honda Scooters
- Hindustan Ambassador facelift
- Hyundai Santro facelift
- Tata Indigo Marina
- Skoda Fabia
- Toyota Qualis facelift
- Toyota Camry
- Hyundai Accent

=== 5th Auto Expo 2000 ===
The 5th Edition of Auto expo was held in Pragiti Maidan from 12 to 18 January 2000. The event was inaugurated by Late.Mr.Murasoli Maran, Union Minister of Commerce and Industry. The expo covered 65,000 sq.m in display area through 18 halls and 20 participating countries. The expo had close to a million visitors and more than 25 new models were launched.

=== 4th Auto Expo 1998 ===
The 4th Edition of Auto Expo was held at Pragati Maidan, New Delhi from 15 to 21 January 1998.

==== Production/Concept Car Launches ====
- Tata Indica V1
- Daewoo Matiz
- Hyundai Santro
- Fiat Palio
- Skoda Felicia
- Ford Fiesta
- Maruti Zen
- Fiat Uno
- Daewoo Cielo
- Opel Astra
- Ford Escort
- Mitsubishi Lancer
- Honda City
- Tata Safari
- Tata Sierra
- Tata Sumo
- Mahindra Armada
- Mercedes E-Class

=== 3rd Auto Expo 1996 ===
The 3rd Edition of Auto Expo was held at Pragati Maidan, New Delhi from 21 to 27 February 1996. The event was inaugurated by the then Finance Minister of India, Dr. Manmohan Singh. The objective of the event was primarily to attract attention of global automotive players to enter India.

=== 2nd Auto Expo 1993 ===
The 2nd Edition of Auto Expo was held at Pragati Maidan, New Delhi from 7 to 15 December 1993. The event was inaugurated by the then Minister of External Affairs of India, Pranab Mukherjee. The primary highlight of the event was the EU – India Automotive Business Forum.

=== 1st Auto Expo 1986 ===
The Auto Expo 1986 was a window for technology transfers showing how the Indian Automotive Industry was absorbing new technologies and promoting indigenous research and development for adapting these technologies for the rugged Indian conditions. The Auto Expo 1986 was marked by then Prime Minister Rajiv Gandhi. The 9 day show was organised from 3 to 11 January 1986 at Pragati Maidan, New Delhi.

== See also ==
- Auto Expo India: Miles and Milestones
- Organisation Internationale des Constructeurs d'Automobiles
- Yamaha R15 dan Yamaha R25 Motor Sport Racing dan Kencang
