= Adra =

Adra may refer to:

== Places ==
- Adra, Spain, municipality in Almería (province), Andalusia
  - Adra Lighthouse, lighthouse in Almería
- Adra, Purulia, town in the state of West Bengal, India
  - Adra railway station, in West Bengal
- Adra, Hooghly, village in the state of West Bengal, India
- Adra, Syria, town approximately 40 km north of Damascus
- Adra, Estonia, village in Harku Parish, Harju County, Estonia

== Other uses ==
- ADRA - Australian Dispute Resolution Association, a professional mediators body
- Adventist Development and Relief Agency, an agency of the Seventh-day Adventist Church
- Adra (moth), a moth genus
- Chevrolet Adra, a concept compact SUV by Chevrolet
