= Mahindra Two Wheelers =

Indian two-wheelers manufacturing company

- Type: Division
- Industry: Motorcycle
- Founded: 2008; 18 years ago
- Defunct: 2020; 6 years ago
- Headquarters: Pune, India
- Area served: Worldwide
- Key people: Anand Mahindra (Chairman & Managing Director)
- Products: Motorcycles
- Brands: BSA Company; Jawa; Yezdi
- Parent: Mahindra & Mahindra
- Website: mahindratwowheelers.com

Mahindra Two Wheelers Limited (MTWL) was a group venture owned by Mahindra & Mahindra (M&M), which manufactures scooters and motorcycles. Mahindra Two Wheelers Limited was founded in 2008, when Mahindra & Mahindra acquired the business assets of Kinetic Motor Company Limited. MTWL has partnered with Taiwan's Sanyang Industry Company (SYM) to help develop its scooter portfolio, and with Italy-based Engines Engineering for research and product design. In October 2016, Mahindra purchased BSA trademark for £3.4 million in an effort to reintroduce motorcycles bearing the BSA name.

== Facilities ==
The company has a manufacturing facility at Pithampur, near Indore in Madhya Pradesh.

Mahindra Two Wheelers Limited has a Research and Development unit located at Chinchwad, Pune, equipped with necessary design and development facilities right from renderings to prototype manufacture and testing. It has invested ₹100 crore (US$11 million) to make it functional.

== Discontinued ==
=== Scooters ===
- Mahindra Flyte
- Mahindra Kine
- Mahindra Rodeo
- Mahindra Rodeo RZ
- Mahindra Rodeo UZO 125
- Mahindra Duro
- Mahindra Duro DZ
- Mahindra Gusto
- Mahindra Gusto 125
- Mahindra Gusto 110

=== Motorcycles ===
- Mahindra Pantero
- Mahindra Stallio
- Mahindra Centuro
- Mahindra Centuro XT
- Mahindra Centuro NXT
- Mahindra Centuro Disc Brake
- Mahindra Centuro Rockstar
- Mahindra Centuro Rockstar Kick Alloy
- Mahindra Mojo
- Mahindra Mojo XT
- Mahindra Mojo UT
- Mahindra Mojo Bs6

== Awards ==
- Mahindra Duro was declared the Scooter of the Year at the annual NDTV Car & Bike Awards in 2010.
- Mahindra Rodeo won the Gulf Monsoon Scooter Rally in its first year of participation.
- Mahindra Rodeo won the Best Website Award - Automotive at Campaign India's Digital Media Awards.
- Mahindra Rodeo RZ won Gulf Dirt Track National Championship.

== See also ==
- List of electric bicycle brands and manufacturers
- GenZe (company)
