= Honda Dream Yuga =

- Manufacturer: Honda Motorcycle and Scooter India (HMSI); Bangladesh Honda Private Limited (BHL)
- Parent company: Honda
- Production: 2012–present (India); 2018–present (Bangladesh)
- Assembly: Gurgaon, India; Munshiganj, Bangladesh
- Class: Standard
- Engine: 109 cc (6.7 cu in), air-cooled, 4 stroke, single-cylinder
- Bore / stroke: 50.0 mm × 55.6 mm (1.97 in × 2.19 in)
- Compression ratio: 9.9:1
- Top speed: Specified: 87 km/h (54 mph)
- Power: 6.15 kW (8.25 hp) @ 7500 rpm
- Torque: 8.63 N⋅m (6.37 lbf⋅ft) @ 5500 rpm
- Ignition type: Kick or self-start
- Transmission: Four-speed manual, chain drive
- Frame type: Diamond
- Suspension: Front: telescopic Rear: Spring-loaded hydraulic
- Brakes: Drum 130 mm (5.1 in)
- Tires: 80/100-18 Tubeless (except spoke variant)
- Wheelbase: 1,285 mm (50.6 in)
- Dimensions: L: 2,022 mm (79.6 in); W: 733 mm (28.9 in); H: 1,095 mm (43.1 in)
- Weight: 108 kg (238 lb) (wet)
- Fuel capacity: 8 L (1.8 imp gal; 2.1 US gal)
- Fuel consumption: from 65 km/L (180 mpg_{‑imp}; 150 mpg_{‑US}) to 74 km/L (210 mpg_{‑imp}; 170 mpg_{‑US})
- Related: Dream Neo; CD 110 Dream

The Dream Yuga is a 109 cc (6.7 cu in) single-cylinder motorcycle manufactured by Honda's Indian subsidiary Honda Motorcycle and Scooter India, starting production in 2012. It was announced by Honda in January 2012 at the Delhi Auto Expo, and was available to consumers in India in May 2012. At 44,642 Indian Rupees, the motorcycle is billed as one of the least expensive Honda motorcycle currently produced, and the least expensive Honda motorcycle ever made, adjusting for inflation.

In order to compete with the predominant Hero MotoCorp, Honda launched a new variant called Dream Neo at an even lower price in 2013. And in 2014 the still cheaper Honda CD 110 Dream followed. Since 2013 the Dream Yuga comes with a more fuel efficient HET engine, the same that is used in the two other motorcycles. From November 2018, Bangladesh Honda Private Limited (BHL) started the manufacturing of Honda Dream Neo 110 in Bangladesh.

== Variants ==
Honda Motorcycle and Scooter India has other models in this 110cc segment that are more or less variants of the Dream Yuga but may not have all the features or may have different features to cater to wider customers and competition from manufacturers like Hero MotoCorp and Bajaj Auto in the 100-110cc segment. Although all models keep the same 110cc engine coupled with same 4-speed gearbox, as well as the diamond-style chassis frame.

=== Dream Neo ===
Prominent differences from Dream Yuga are the inclusion of goods-carrier rear handle-grip, yellow turn-indicators, and different head-lamp style. Rest of the features are kept unchanged.

=== CD110 Dream DX ===
This is the lowest priced variant. Prominent differences inherit all changes from Dream Neo, plus the bike doesn't get the black-themed engine and alloy wheels, both of which keep the aluminium shade of color.

Previous versions of this bike came without auto-start (kick-start only), spoked-wheels and tube-based tires, to keep costs down for intended customers. But new models since 2018 have both auto-start and alloy-tubeless features.
