= Automotive Component Manufacturers Association of India =

Indian automotive company

- Abbreviation: ACMA
- Headquarters: New Delhi, India
- Region served: Worldwide
- President: Shradha Suri Marwah
- Director General: Vinnie Mehta
- Website: www.acma.in

Automotive Component Manufacturers Association (ACMA) is an organization representing manufacturers in the Indian auto component industry, founded in 1959. It is associated with trade promotion, technology enhancement, quality improvement and gathering of information to help in the development of the industry.

ACMA organizes Auto Expo with the SIAM in association with the Confederation of Indian Industry (CII).

Toyota has signed a partnership agreement to impart training programs focusing on people development and lean management principles to the industry members of ACMA through its training arm Toyota Learning and Development India.
