= Haval Shenshou =

Compact crossover SUV

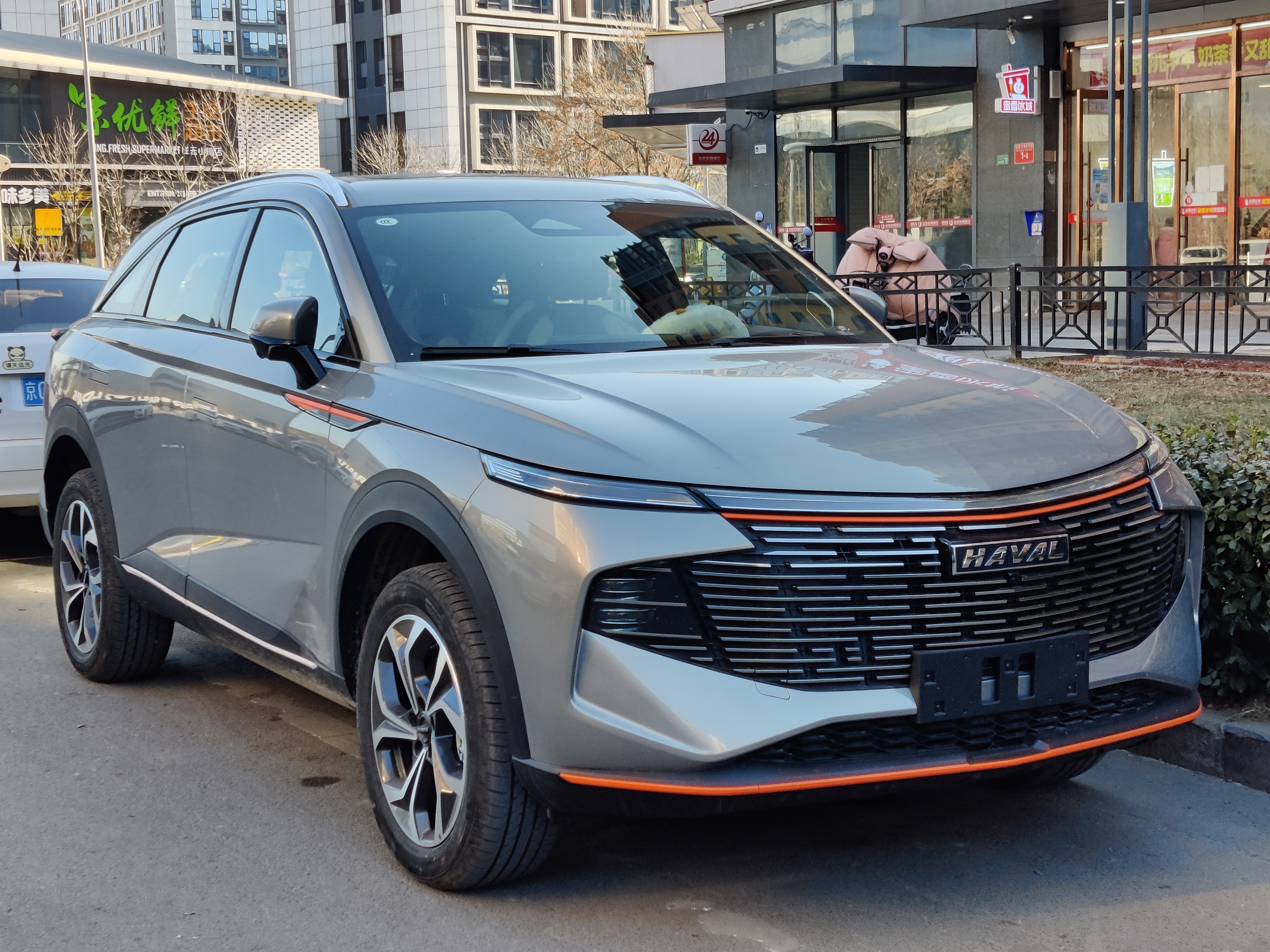

Overview
- Manufacturer: Great Wall Motor
- Also called: Haval F7/F7x (Russia)
- Production: 2021–2025 (China); 2024–present (Russia)
- Assembly: China: Tianjin (Great Wall Motor Co., Ltd. Tianjin Branch); Russia: Tula (Haval Motor Rus, LLC)
- Designer: Matthew James Swann

Body and chassis
- Class: Compact crossover SUV
- Body style: 5-door SUV; 5-door coupe SUV (F7x, Russia)
- Platform: LEMON platform
- Related: Haval H6

Powertrain
- Engine: Petrol: 1.5 L GW4B15C turbo I4; 2.0 L GW4C20A turbo I4
- Electric motor: 134 hp; 136 PS (100 kW) DHT100 BorgWarner permanent magnet synchronous motor
- Power output: 182 hp; 185 PS (136 kW) (1.5 L Turbo); 224 bhp; 227 PS (167 kW) (2.0 L Turbo)
- Transmission: 7-speed DCT; Multi-mode DHT (hybrid)
- Hybrid drivetrain: Power-split Hybrid (hybrid)
- Battery: 1.8 kWh li-ion (hybrid)

Dimensions
- Wheelbase: 2,800 mm (110.2 in)
- Length: 4,780 mm (188.2 in)
- Width: 1,890 mm (74.4 in)
- Height: 1,676 mm (66.0 in)
- Curb weight: 1,580–1,780 kg (3,483–3,924 lb)

Chronology
- Predecessor: Haval F7 (Russia)

The Haval Shenshou (Chinese: 哈弗神兽; pinyin: Hāfú Shénshòu; lit. 'divine beast', 'mythical beast') is a compact crossover SUV produced by Great Wall Motor under the Haval brand.

In the company model range, it occupies a place between the Haval H7 and the flagship Haval H9.

== Overview ==
The Shenshou was presented as the Haval XY Concept unveiled in Auto Shanghai in April 2021. The final production version of the Shenshou was unveiled in China in August 2021, and launched on December 18, 2021.

The Shenshou rides on the LEMON modular platform of Great Wall Motors, and will be equipped with GWM's Coffee Intelligence system for infotainment, using the Qualcomm 8155 chip.

The term Shenshou is the Chinese word for "Mythical Beast" in English.

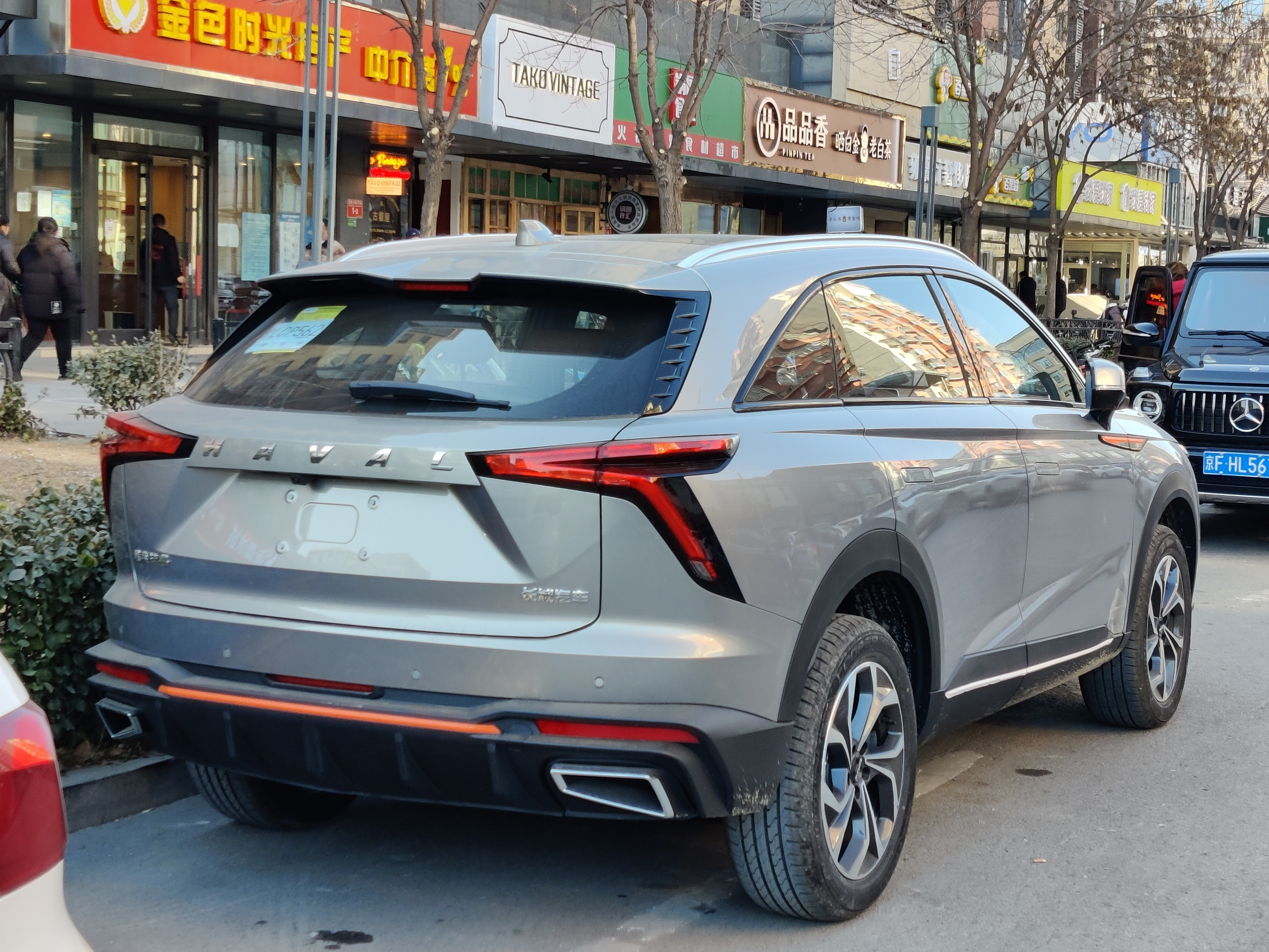
Rear view

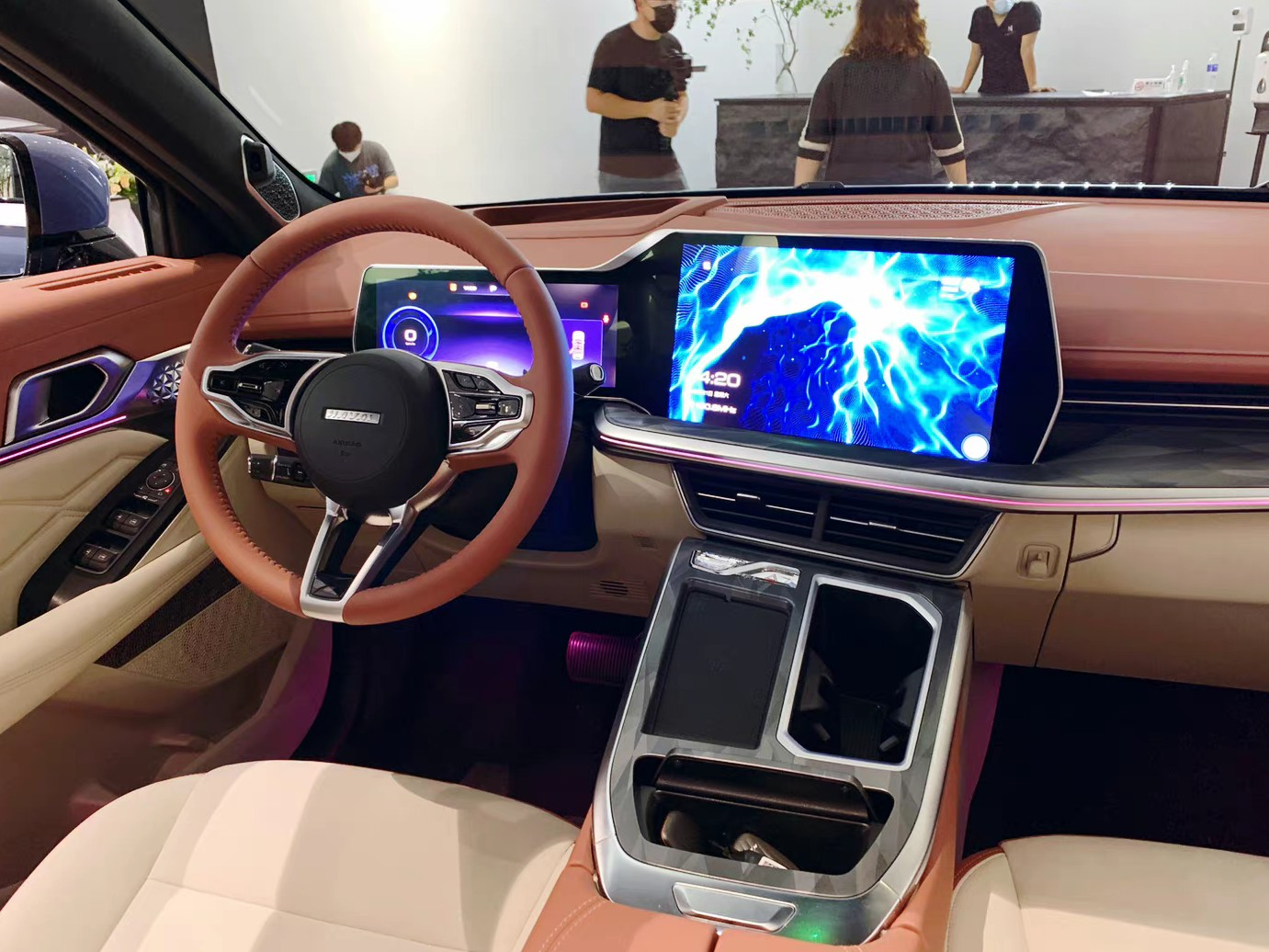
Interior

== Powertrain ==
The Haval Shenshou is powered by a 1.5-litre turbocharged petrol engine tuned to produce 185 hp (138 kW; 188 PS) and 162 lb⋅ft (220 N⋅m; 22 kg⋅m) of torque, paired with a 7-speed dual-clutch transmission. A 2.0-litre engine variant tuned to produce 224 hp (167 kW; 227 PS) and 345 N⋅m (254 lb⋅ft; 35 kg⋅m) of torque is also available and a hybrid variant will be added in the near future.

== Haval F7/F7x II ==
Since August 2024, it has been produced in Russia at the plant near Tula as the second generation Haval F7. A coupe SUV version is also available as the Haval F7x since March 2025.

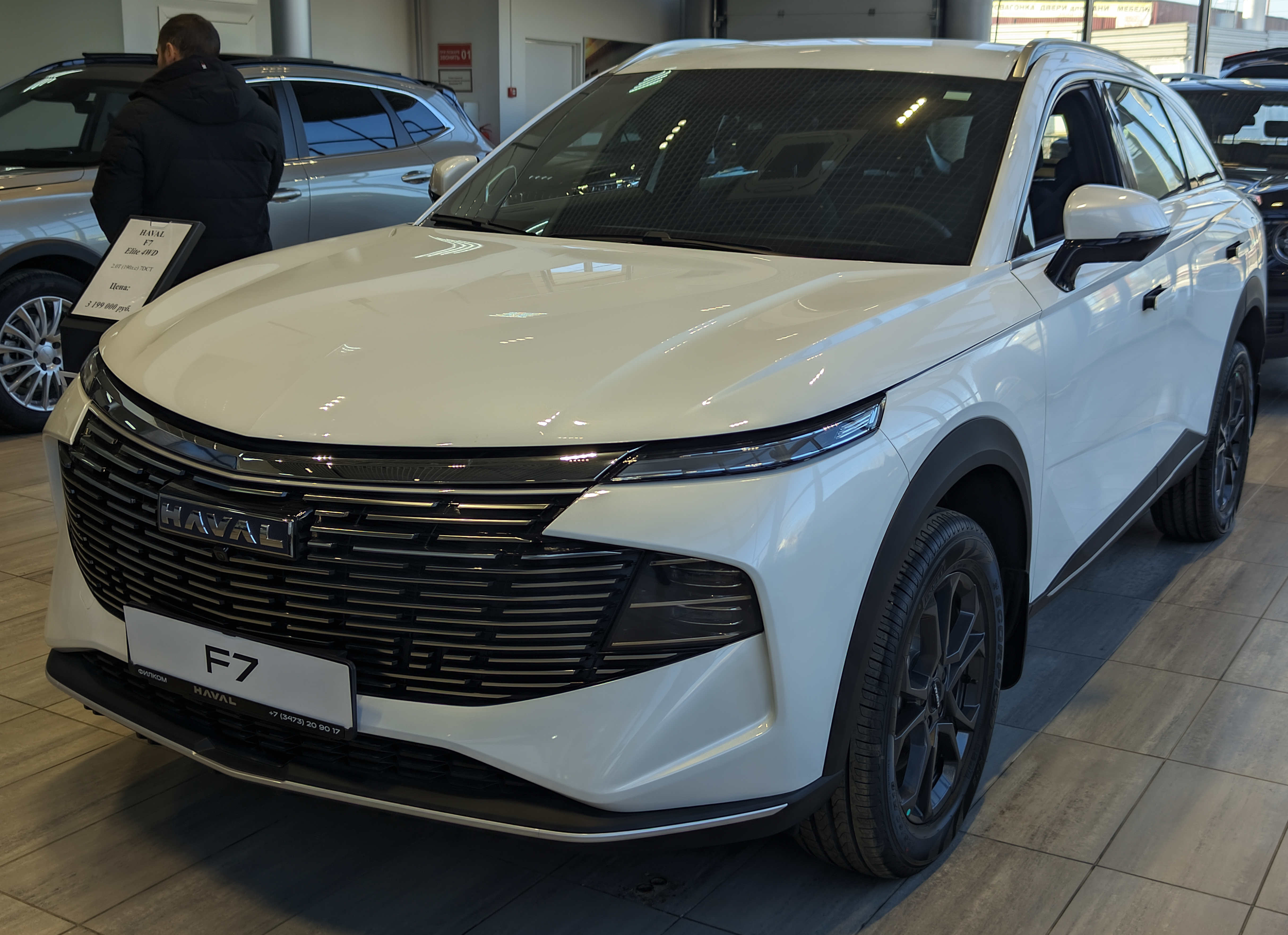
Haval F7 II

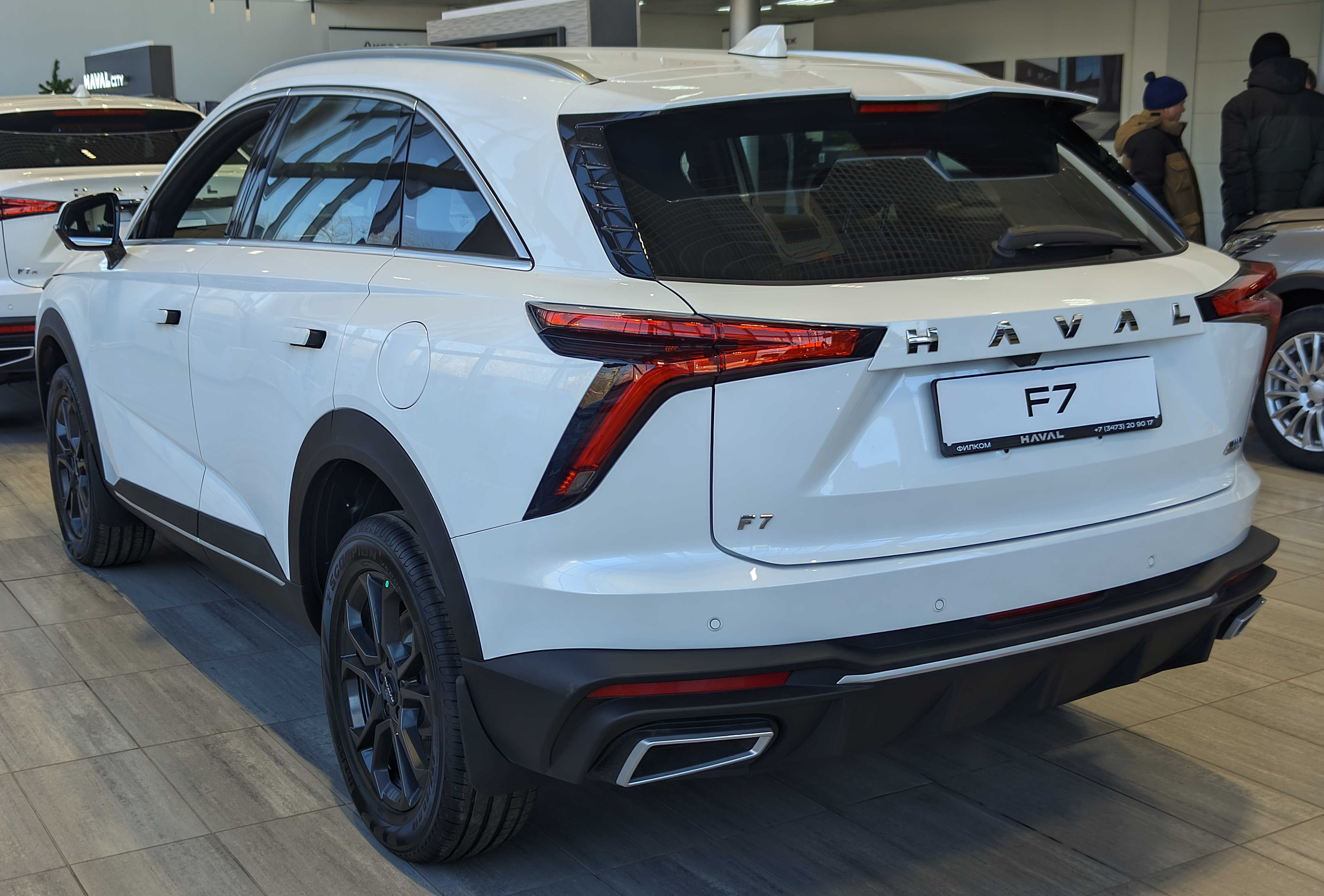
Rear view

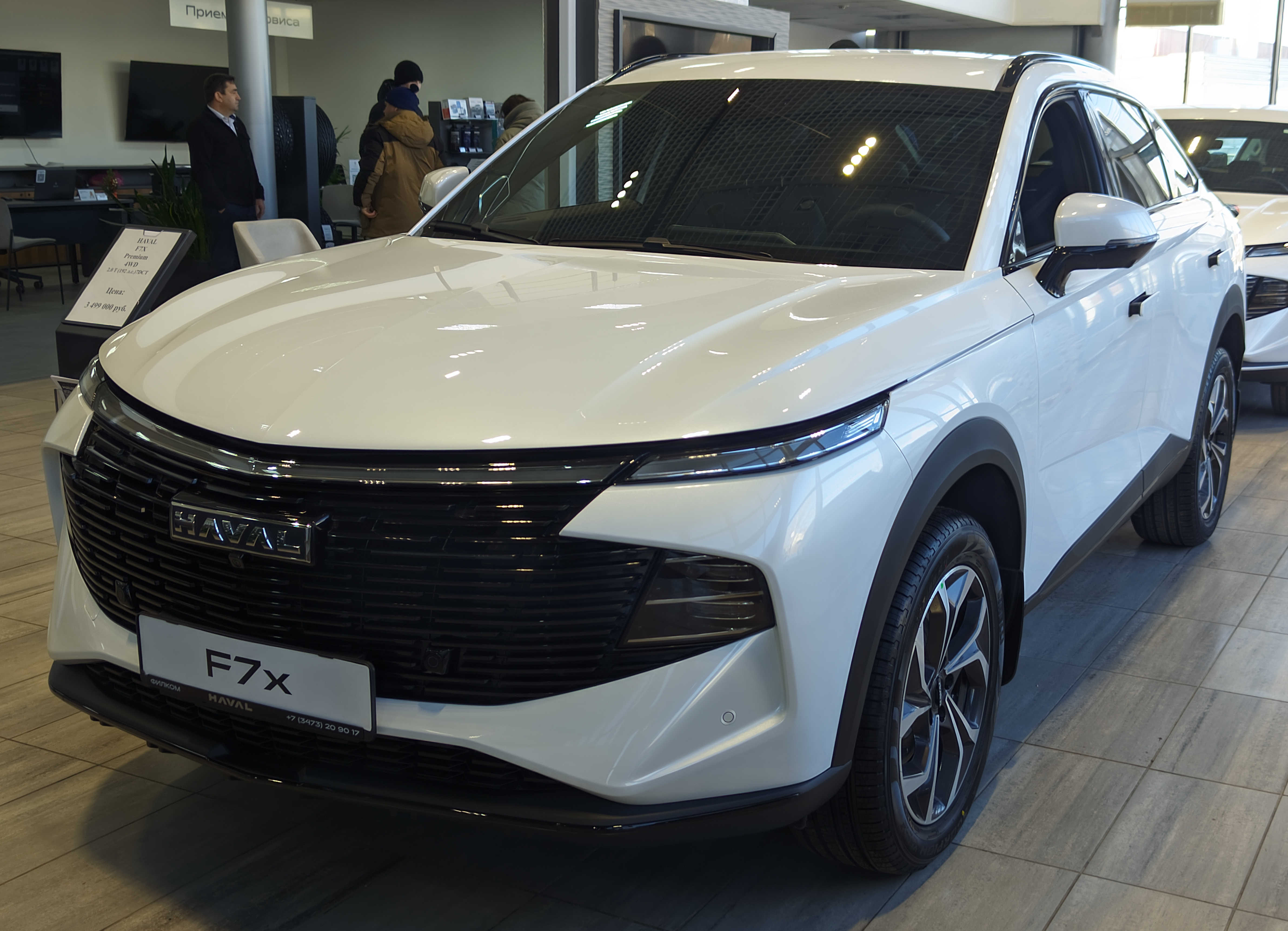
Haval F7x II

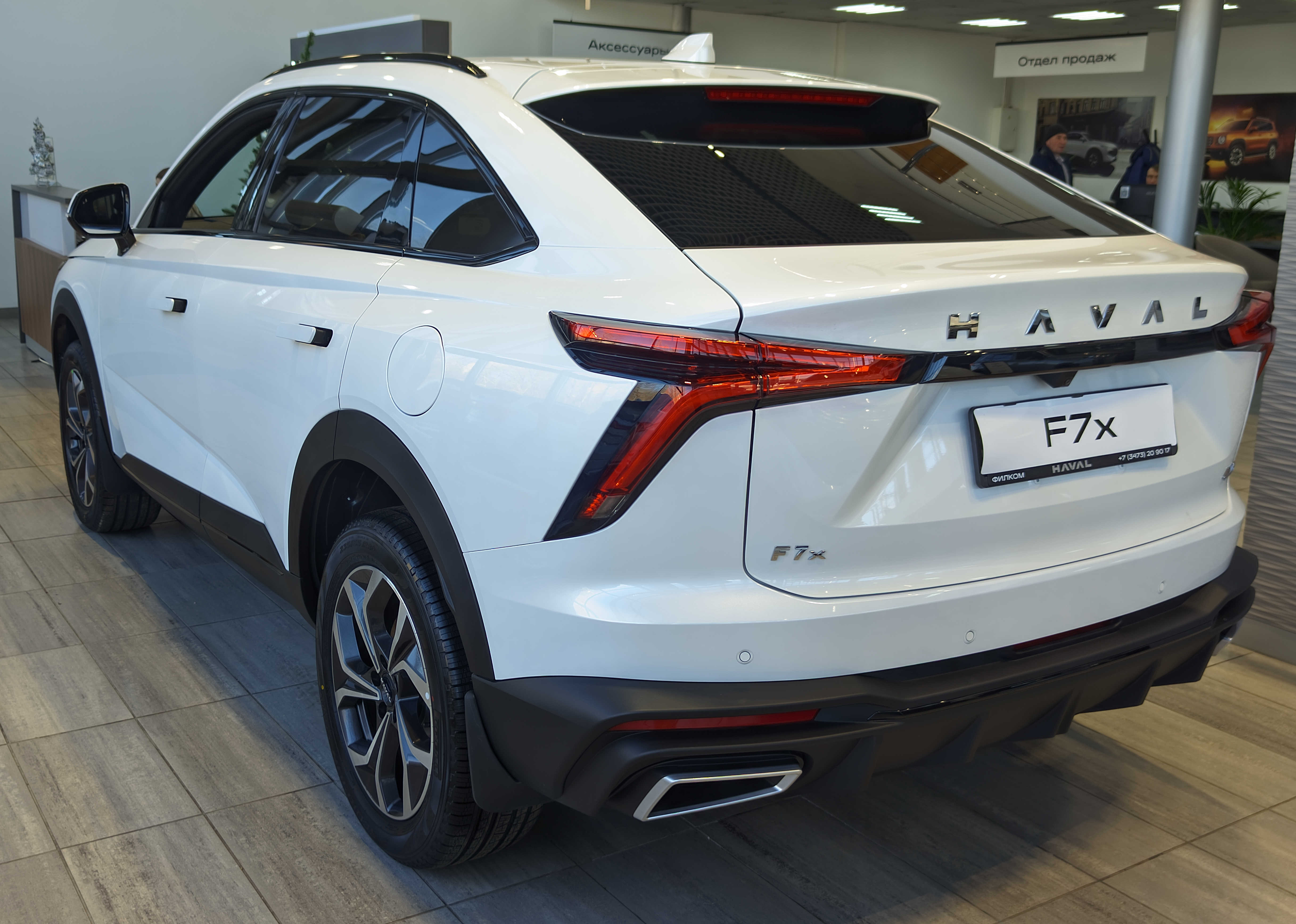
Rear view

== Sales ==
| Year | China |
|---|---|
| 2023 | 11,714 |
| 2024 | 608 |
| 2025 | 49 |
