= Ashok Leyland MiTR =

Overview
- Type: Minibus
- Manufacturer: Ashok Leyland
- Production: Jul 2014 - present
- Model years: 2014, 2015
- Designer: Ashok Leyland

Body and chassis
- Class: Buses
- Body style: Bus
- Layout: Front-engine, rear-wheel-drive layout
- Doors: 2

Powertrain
- Engine: 2,953 cm^{3} (180.21 cu in): ZD30 DDTi Common rail, BS III (diesel)
- Transmission: 5 speed Manual

Dimensions
- Wheelbase: 3,700 mm (145.67 in)
- Length: 7,060 mm (277.95 in)
- Width: 2,080 mm (81.89 in)
- Height: 2,630 mm (103.54 in)
- Curb weight: 4,025 kg (8,874 lb)

Chronology
- Predecessor: None
- Successor: None

The Ashok Leyland MiTR is a Minibus manufactured by Ashok Leyland in Joint venture with Nissan. The vehicle was unveiled in January 2014 during the 12th Auto Expo 2014 and was launched in July 2014.

== Variants ==
Ashok Leyland MiTR comes in one variant.

== Specifications ==
Ashok Leyland MiTR

- Seating capacity: 28 (including driver)
- Displacement: 2,953 ^{cm3}
- Max Engine power: 116.67 Bhp
- Max Torque: 320 N⋅m (236 lbf⋅ft) @ 2,400 rpm
- Engine: ZD30 DDTi Common rail, BS III
- Fuel: Diesel

== See also ==
- Ashok Leyland
