= Omega Seiki Mobility =

Indian electric vehicle manufacturer

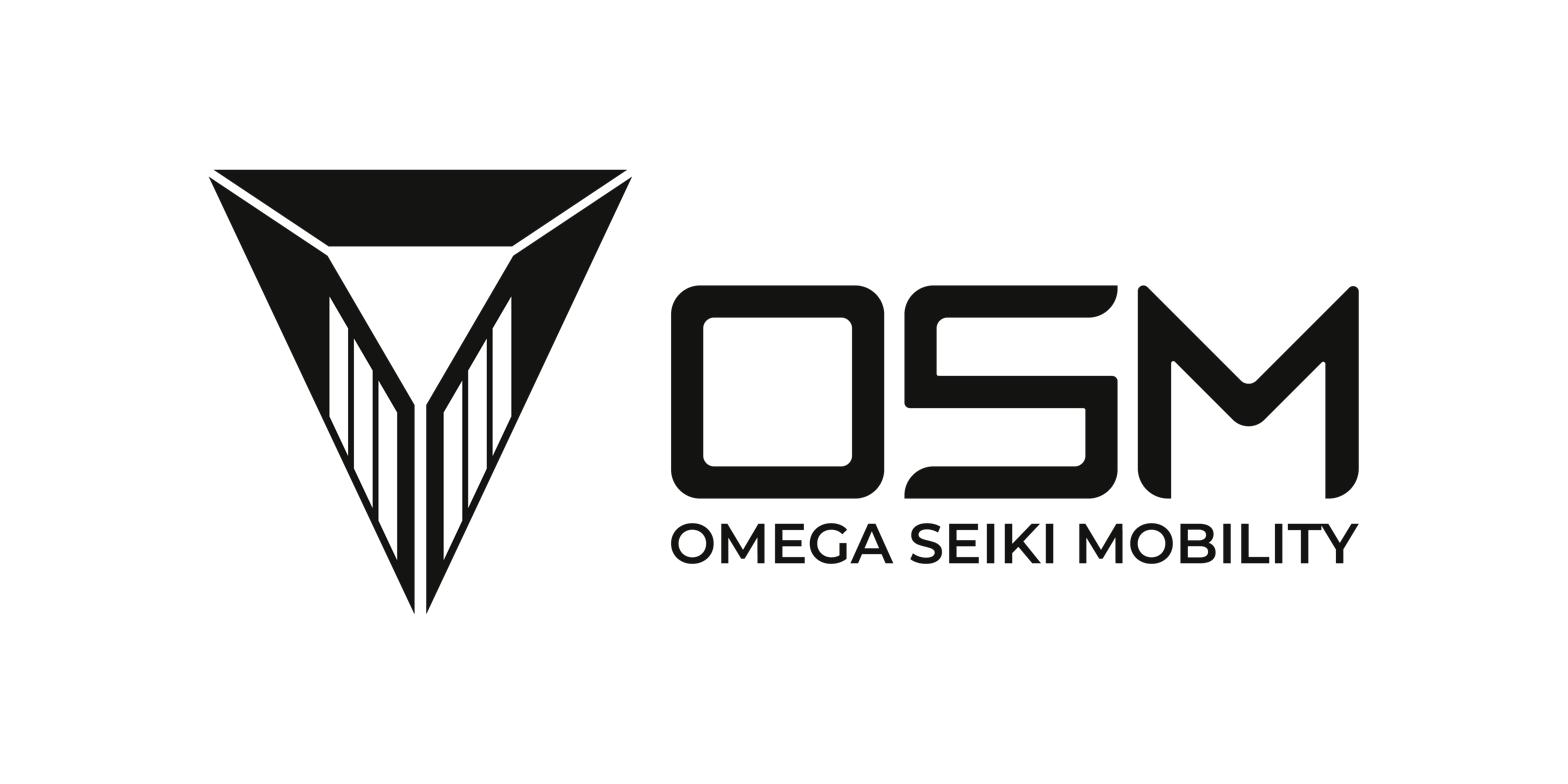
- Type: Private
- Industry: Automotive industry; Electric vehicles
- Founder: Uday Narang
- Key people: Uday Narang (Chairperson)
- Products: Rage+ Stream
- Owner: Uday Narang
- Number of employees: 350
- Parent: Omega Seiki Pvt Ltd
- Website: omegaseikimobility.com

Omega Seiki Mobility (OSM) is an Indian electric vehicle manufacturer headquartered in New Delhi. The company produces electric three-wheelers and commercial vehicles used primarily for logistics and urban transport. It operates as an automotive division of the Anglian Omega Group.

== Operations ==
Omega Seiki Mobility operates manufacturing and assembly facilities in the Delhi National Capital Region, as well as in Pune and Chennai. The company maintains a research and development and manufacturing site in Faridabad, while additional production activity takes place in Manesar, Pune and Chennai.

== Products ==
The company’s first vehicle, Rage+, was developed at its facility in Faridabad, Haryana. It was introduced in February 2020 at Auto Expo 2020.

The company has also presented a refrigerated electric three-wheeler variant known as Rage+ Frost intended for temperature-controlled transport.

== Development ==
The parent company has stated that it plans to invest between US$300 million and US$600 million in Omega Seiki Mobility’s electric vehicle operations.

In 2024, the company announced plans to introduce hydrogen-powered three-wheelers developed in partnership with a French technology firm.
