= Adra (moth) =

Scientific classification
- Kingdom: Animalia
- Phylum: Arthropoda
- Class: Insecta
- Order: Lepidoptera
- Superfamily: Noctuoidea
- Family: Erebidae
- Subfamily: Calpinae
- Genus: Adra; Walker 1863

Genus of moths

Adra is a genus of moths of the family Noctuidae.

== Species ==
- Adra argentilinea Walker, 1863
- Adra nicobarica Hampson, 1926
