= Chevrolet Adra =

Chevrolet subcompact SUV concept

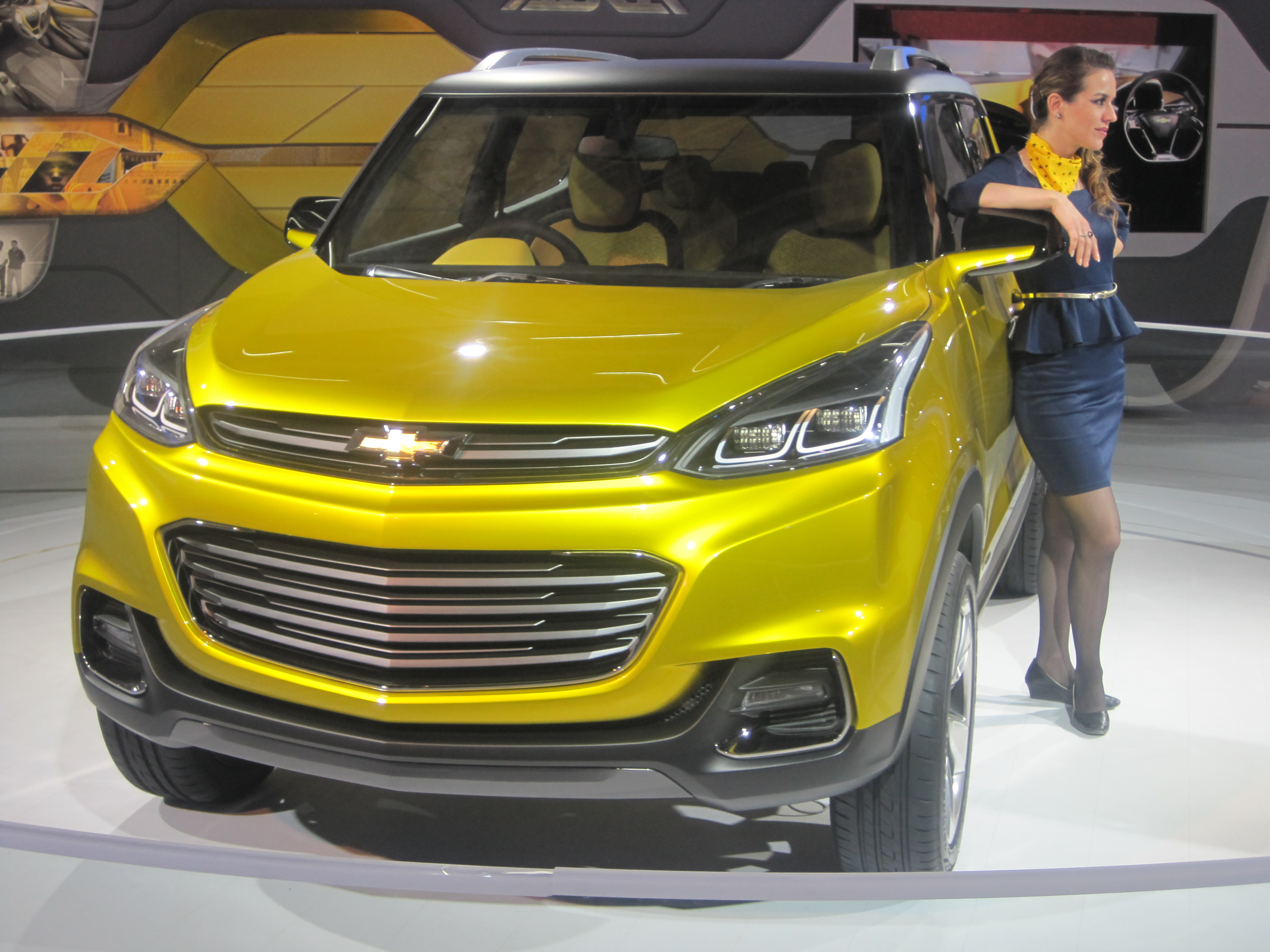
- Chevrolet Adra on display in 12th Auto Expo 2014 in Greater Noida, India.

Overview
- Type: Compact SUV
- Manufacturer: Chevrolet (General Motors)
- Production: 2014
- Designer: GM India

Body and chassis
- Class: Subcompact crossover SUV
- Body style: 5 door
- Layout: Front-engine, rear-wheel-drive layout
- Related: Chevrolet Trax; Chevrolet Trax (concept)

Powertrain
- Engine: 1,300 cm^{3} (79.33 cu in): MultiJet (diesel)

Dimensions
- Wheelbase: 2525 mm
- Length: 3.800m

The Chevrolet Adra is a concept subcompact crossover SUV unveiled in Auto Expo 2014 by Chevrolet. The car was designed by General Motors India Private Limited in their Bangalore facility. Production of the Adra was going to be in 2016 or 2017 as an India-only subcompact SUV, but production was cancelled as Chevrolet sales were declining in India, leading to Chevrolet pulling out of the Indian market, along with South Africa, in 2017.

== See also ==
- Chevrolet Trax
- Chevrolet Trax (concept)
