= Haval F7 =

Compact crossover SUV

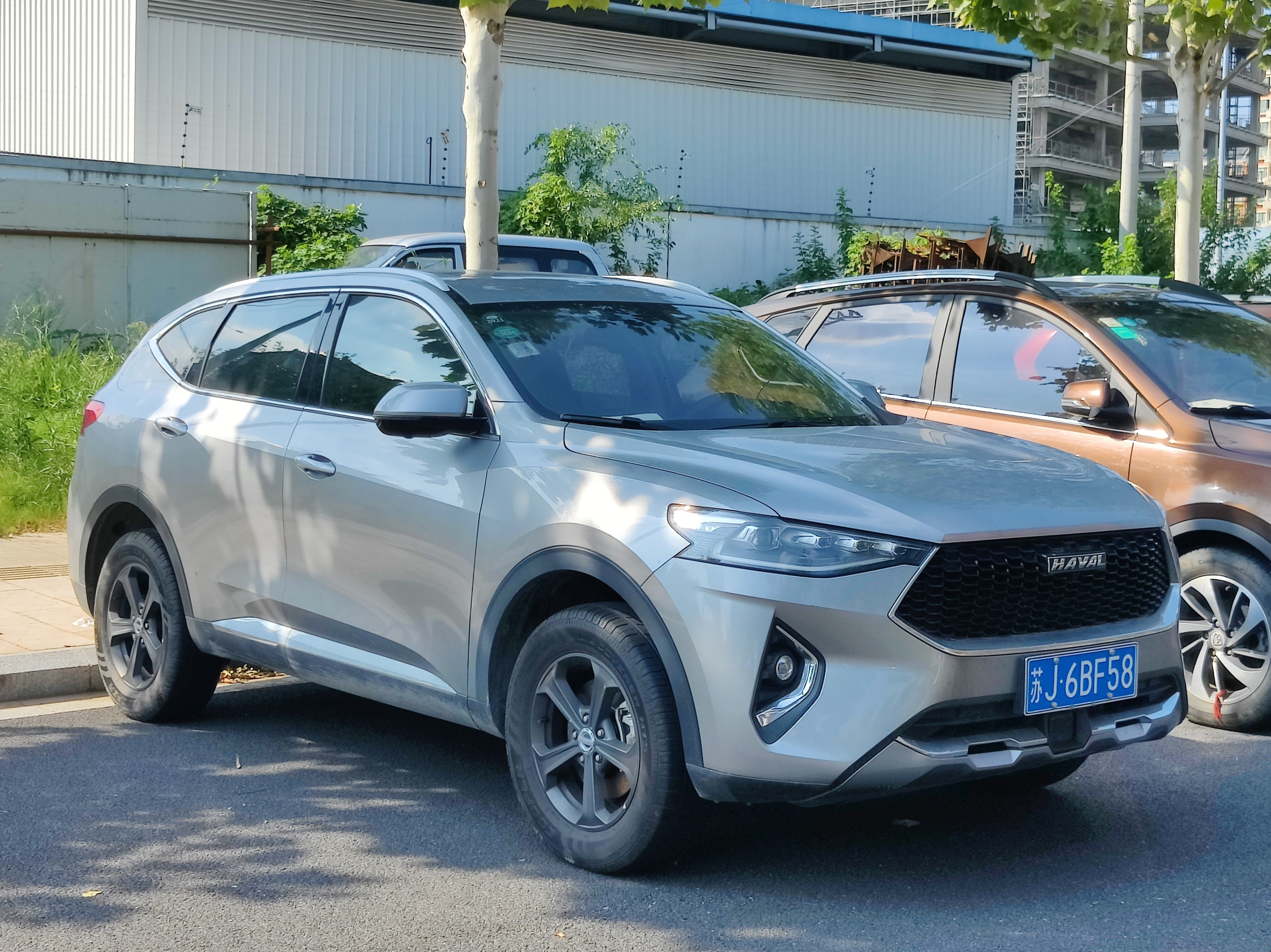

Overview
- Manufacturer: Great Wall Motor
- Production: 2018–present

Body and chassis
- Class: Compact crossover SUV (C)
- Body style: 5-door SUV; 5-door coupe SUV (F7x)
- Layout: Front-engine, front-wheel-drive or all-wheel-drive

The Haval F7 is a compact crossover SUV produced by Great Wall Motor under the Haval brand since 2018. The first generation was introduced both in China and Russia, with the regular crossover SUV body style launched in late 2018, and the coupe version introduced in 2019. The second generation model was sold in China from 2021 to 2025 as the Haval Shenshou and was only introduced in Russia in 2024 as the second generation F7.

== First generation (2018) ==
First generation
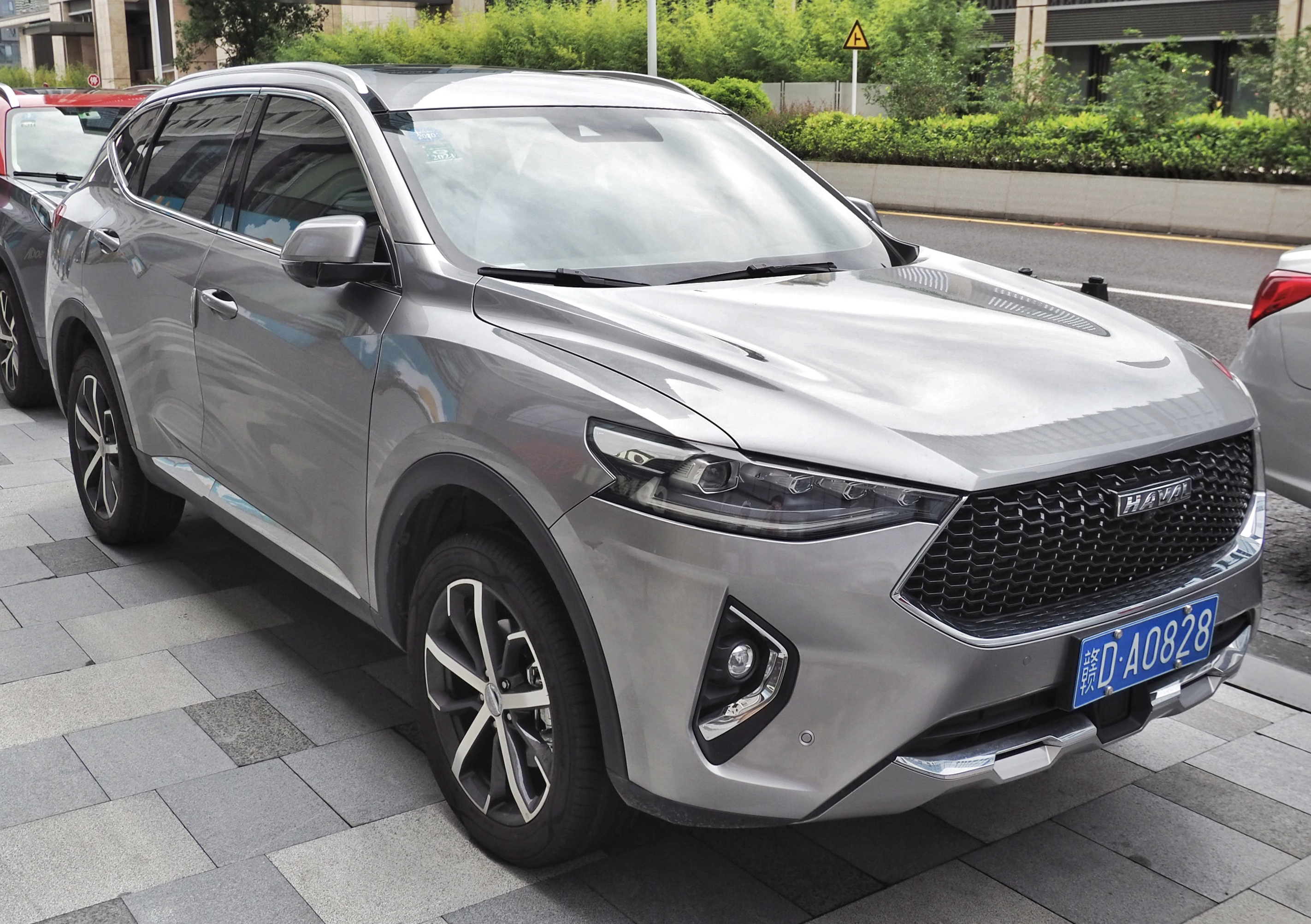

Overview
- Manufacturer: Great Wall Motors
- Also called: Great Wall Haval F7
- Production: 2018–2021 (China); 2018–2024 (Russia)
- Assembly: China: Tianjin (Great Wall Motor Co., Ltd. Tianjin Branch); Russia: Tula (Haval Motor Rus, LLC)

Body and chassis
- Layout: FF layout
- Related: Haval H6; WEY VV5

Powertrain
- Engine: Petrol: 1.5 L GW4B15 turbo I4; 2.0 L GW4C20NT turbo I4
- Transmission: 7-speed DCT

Dimensions
- Wheelbase: 2,725 mm (107.3 in)
- Length: 4,620 mm (181.9 in)
- Width: 1,846 mm (72.7 in)
- Height: 1,690 mm (66.5 in) (F7); 1,660 mm (65.4 in) (F7x)

Chronology
- Successor: Haval Shenshou (for Haval F7, Russia)

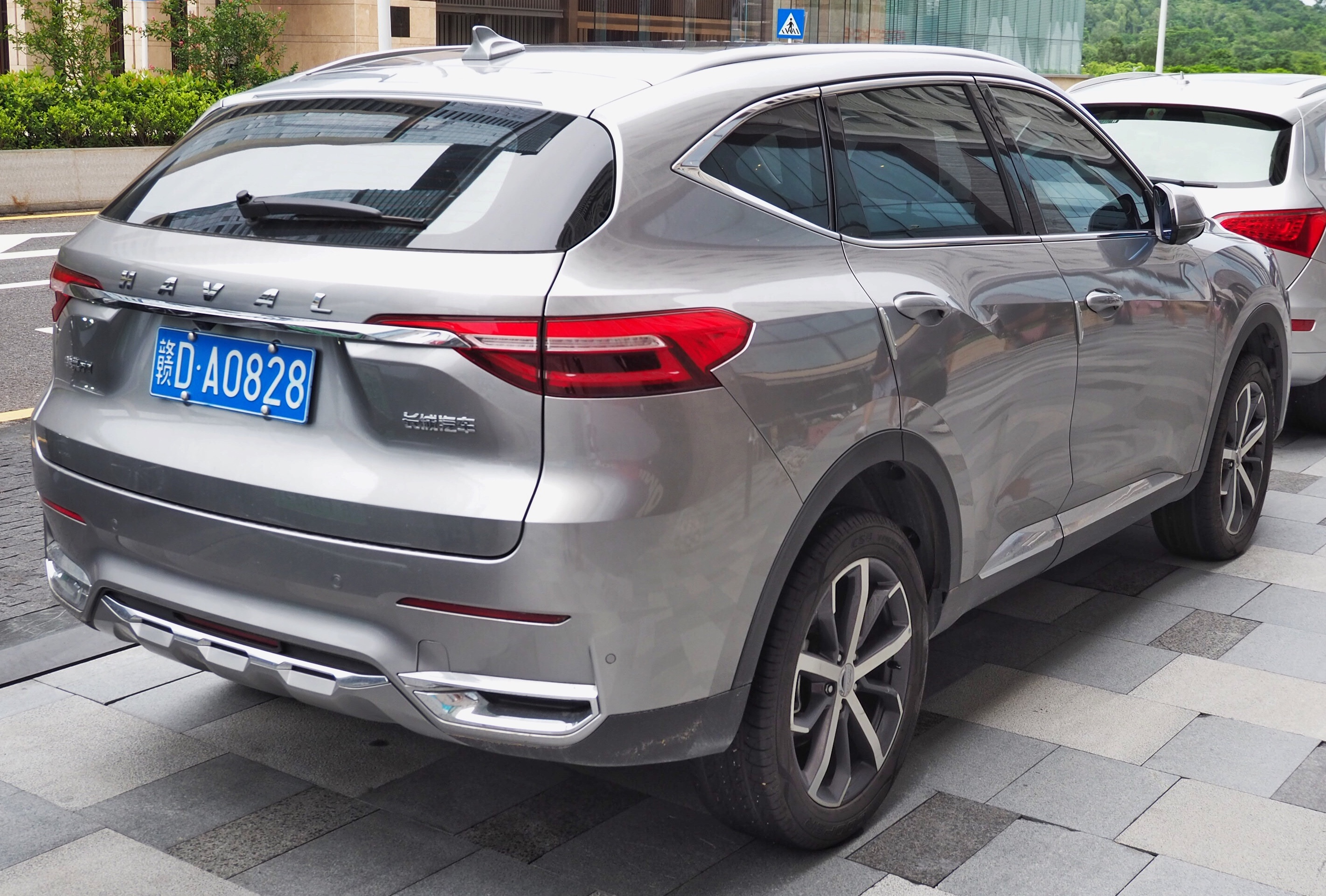
Rear view

The vehicle debuted on 29 August 2018 at the Moscow International Automobile Salon. In November 2018, sales began in China. The Russian market is expected to follow in the spring of 2019. The vehicle is positioned above the Haval F5 and is based on the WEY VV6. Haval provided a preview of the upcoming SUV at Auto Shanghai in April 2017 with the concept car Haval HB-03.

Power of the F7 comes from a 2.0-litre turbocharged four-cylinder petrol engine developing 147 kW (197 hp; 200 PS) and 345 N⋅m (254 lb⋅ft; 35 kg⋅m). A 1.5-litre inline-4 engine is also offered. Power is sent to the front wheels through a seven-speed DCT with wet clutches developed by Great Wall Motor. In August 2024, the Tula plant stopped producing the first generation F7 and F7x crossovers, production of the Haval Shenshou as a second generation model has begun.

=== Haval F7x ===
A fastback version of the Haval F7 was called as the Haval F7x debuted during the 2019 Shanghai Auto Show. The Haval F7x shares the same structures as the Haval F7, and all parts before the B-pillars are the same. As the cross-coupe version, the F7x differs only externally: the roof is lowered by 350 mm and tilted at the back, and the rear overhang is slightly shortened.

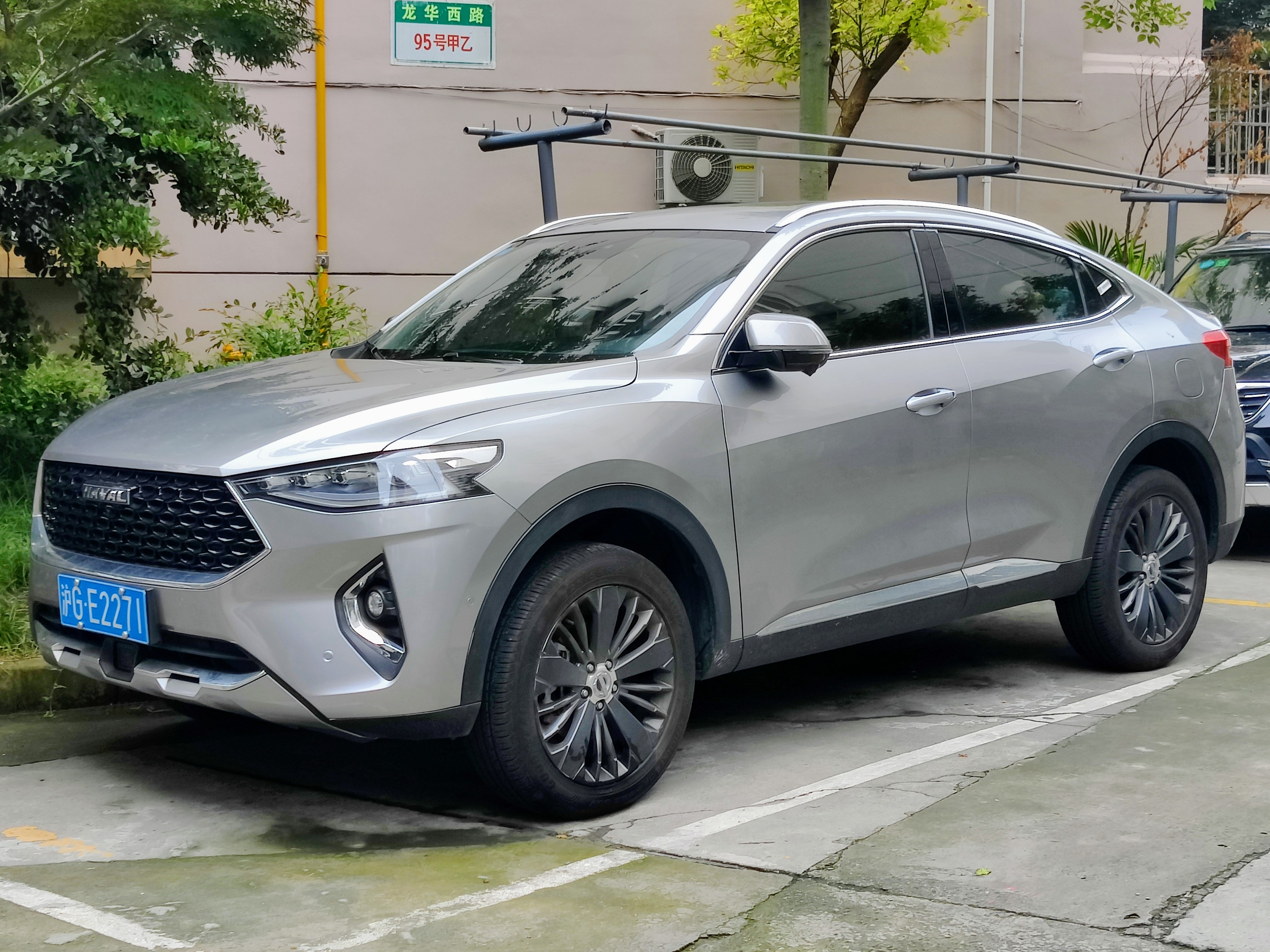
Haval F7x

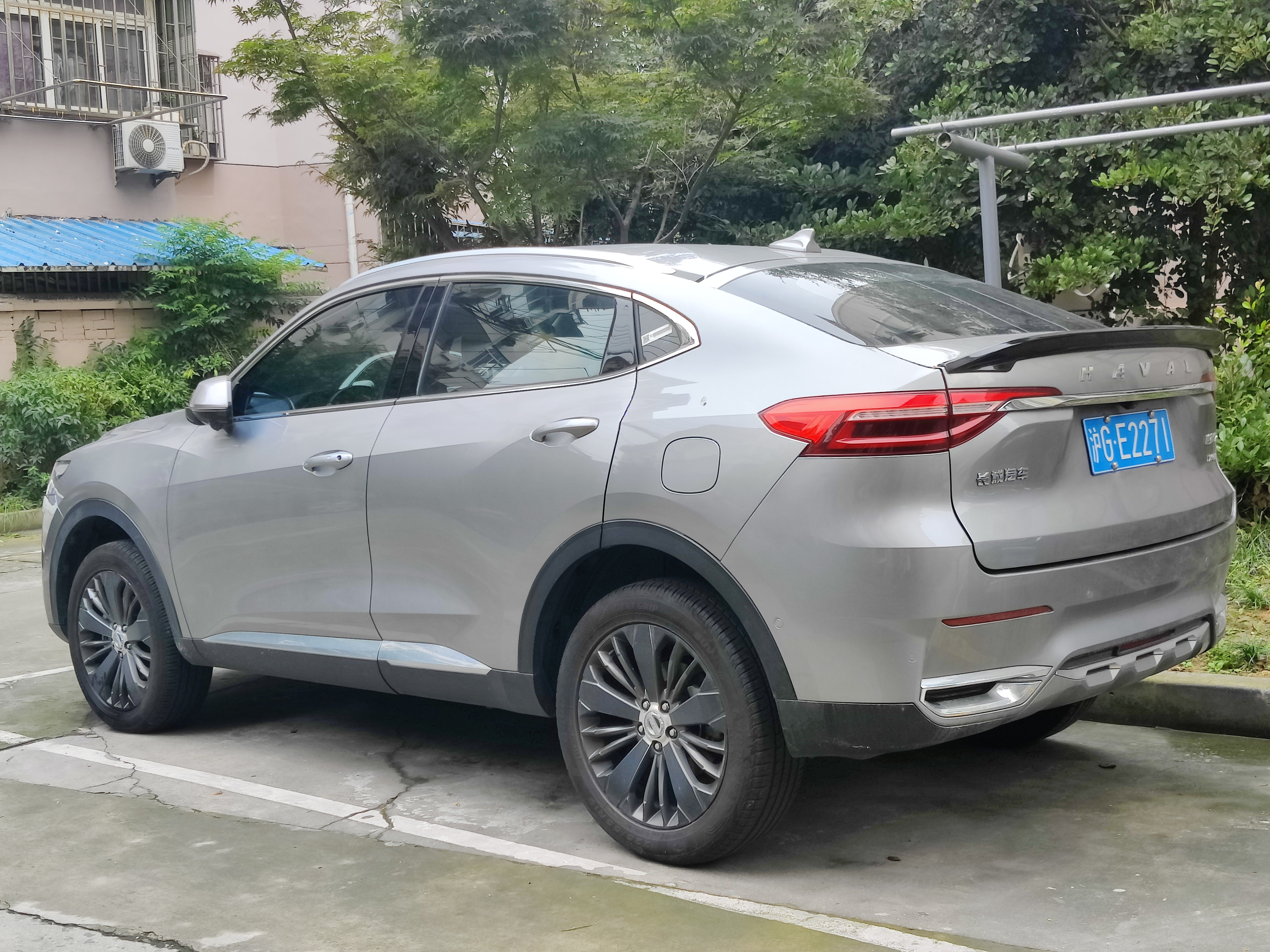
Rear view

=== 2022 (facelift) ===
Both the F7 and the F7x received facelift restyling in 2022 for export markets. The restyle features redesigned grilles to be more inline with the Haval Shenshou launched in the domestic Chinese market.

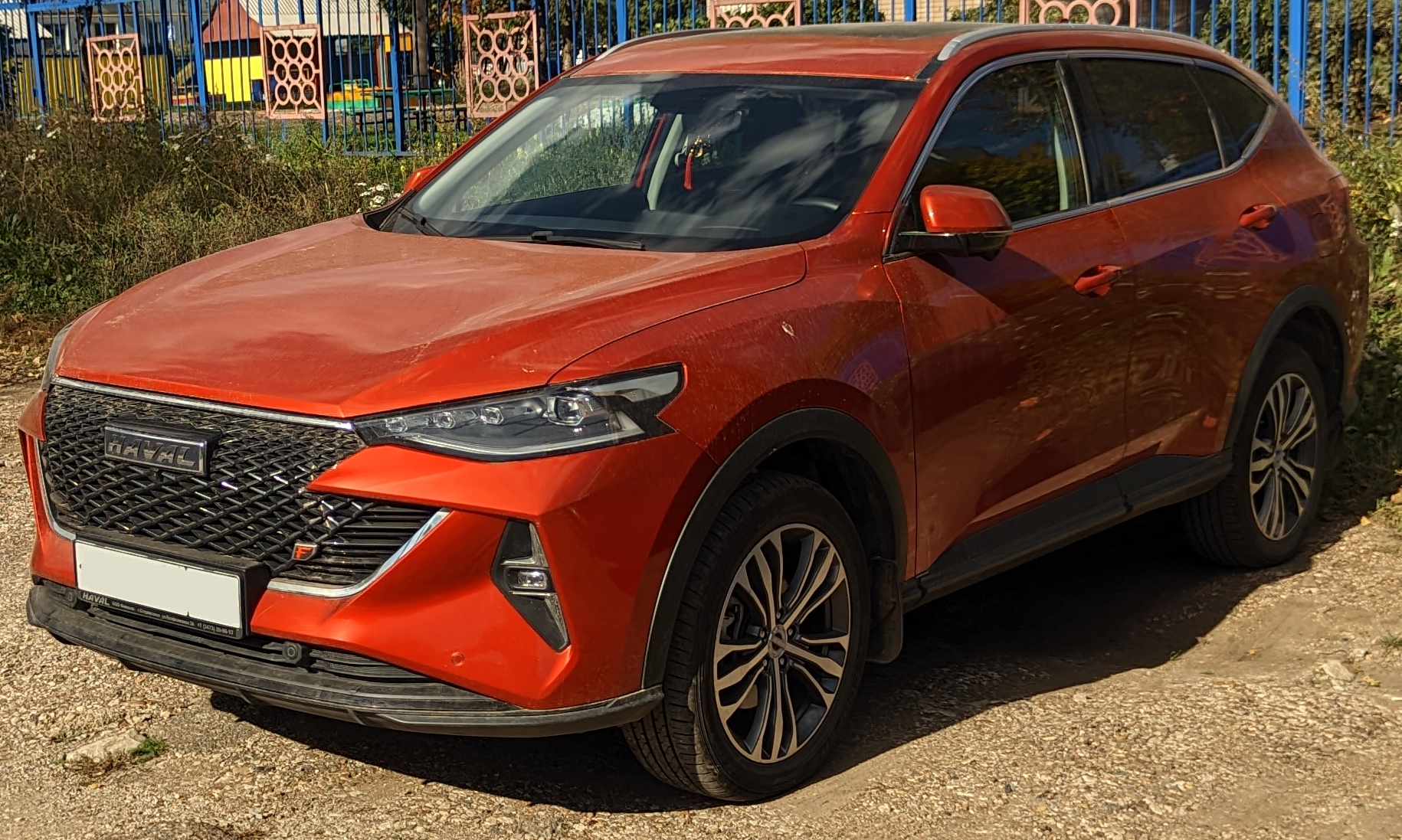
Haval F7 2022 (facelift)

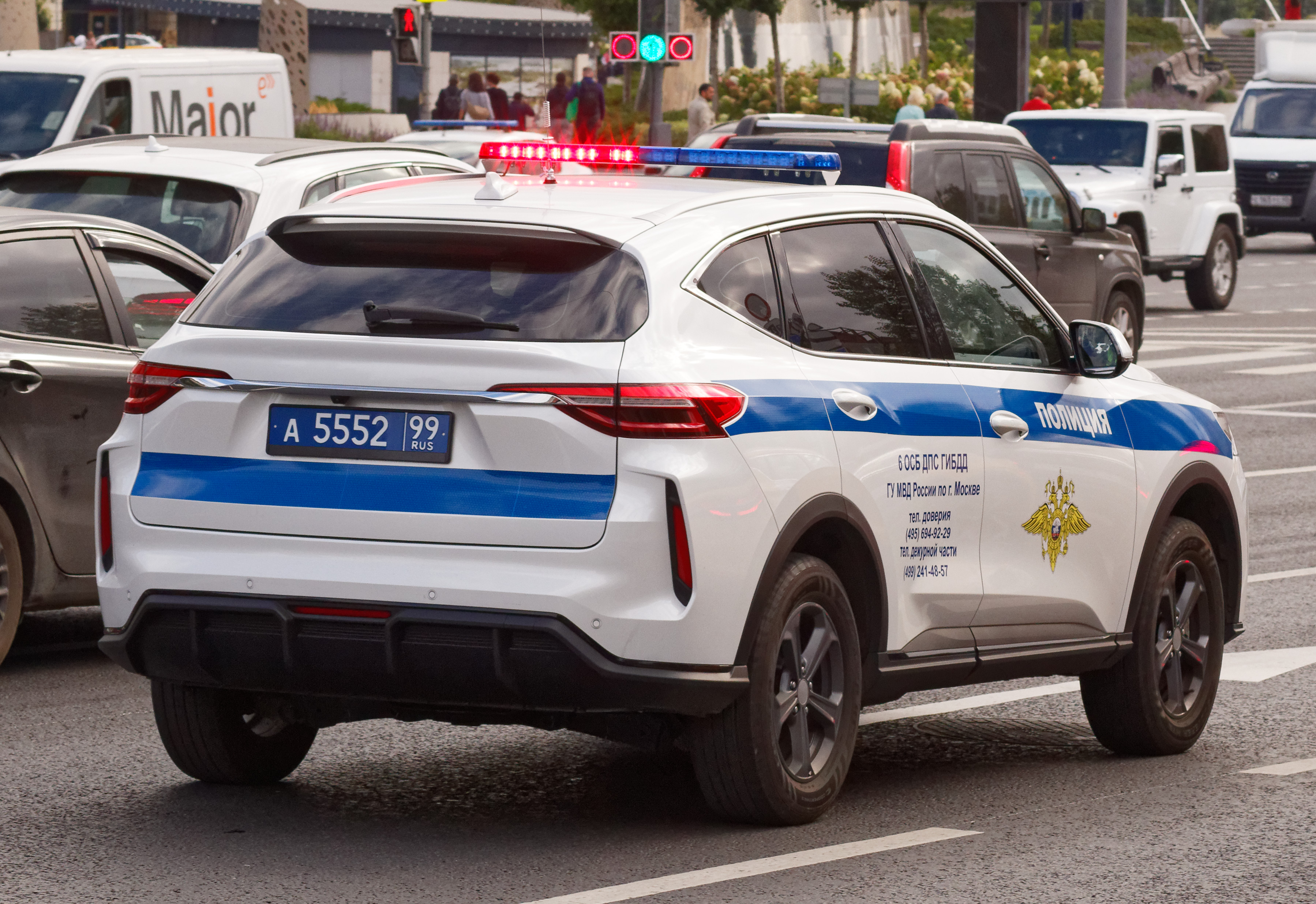
Rear view

== Second generation (2024) ==
Previewed as the Haval XY Concept was unveiled in Auto Shanghai in April 2021, the second generation F7 was first introduced in China as the Haval Shenshou on December 18, 2021, and was only introduced in Russia in 2024 as the second generation F7.

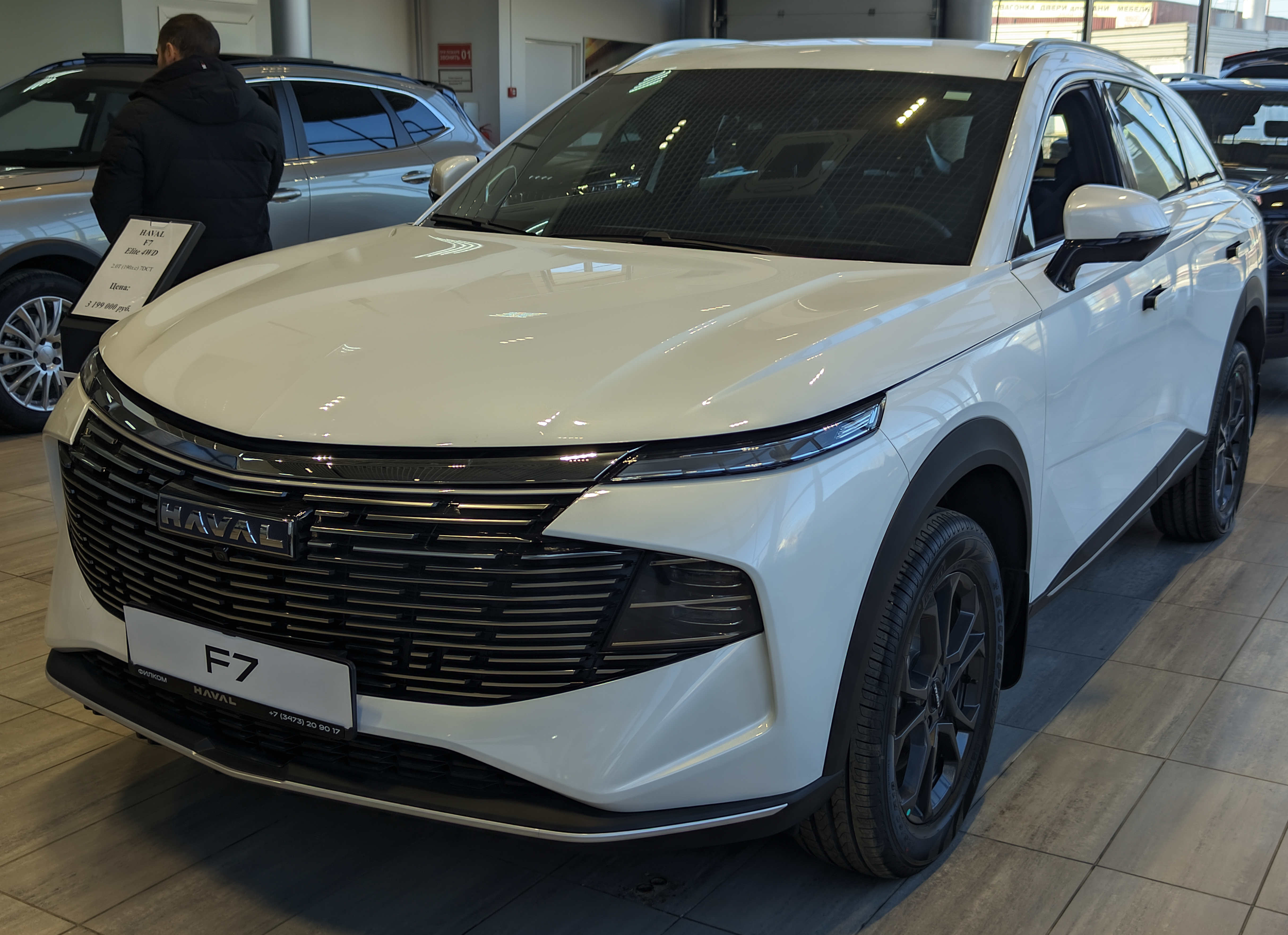
Haval F7 II

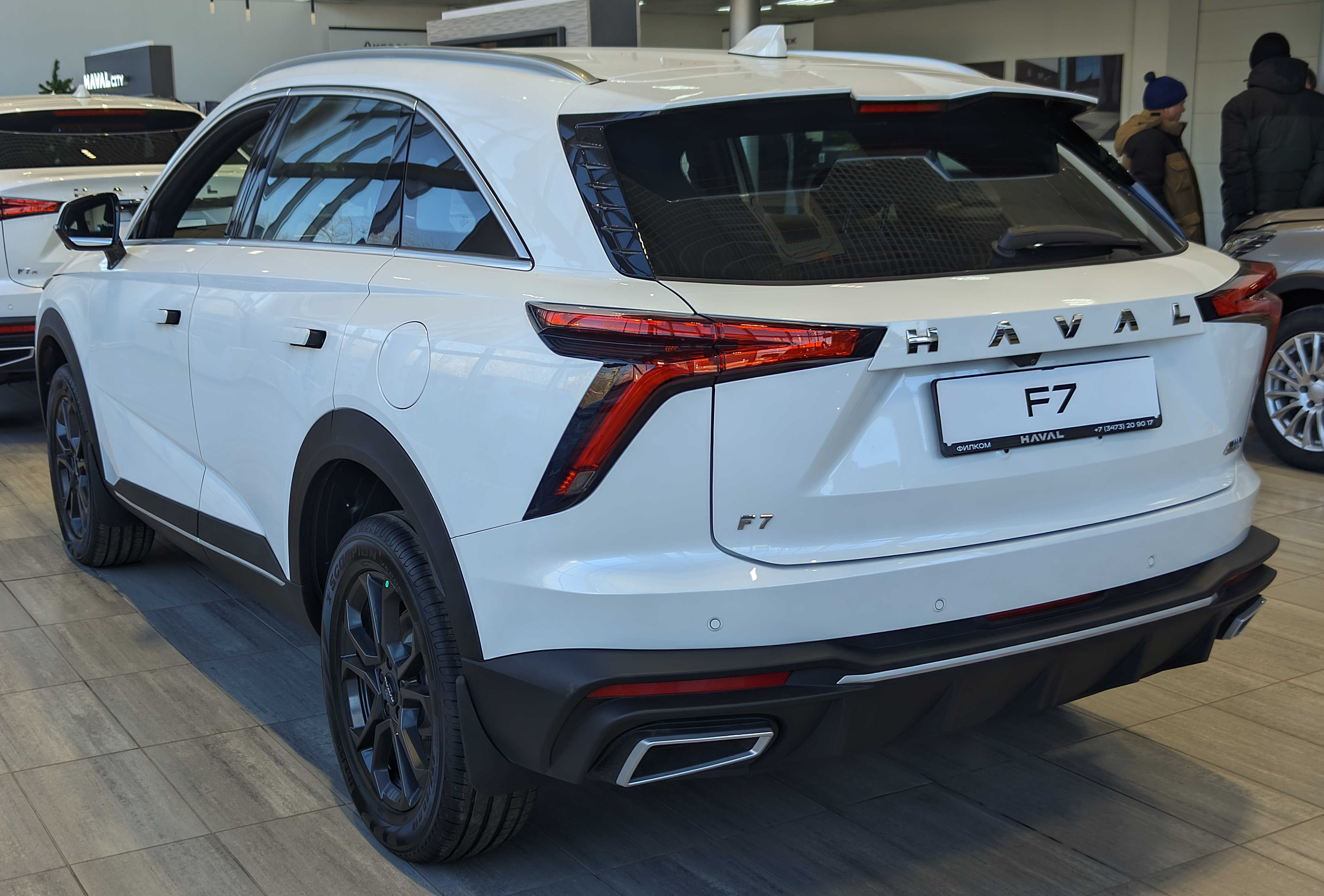
Rear view

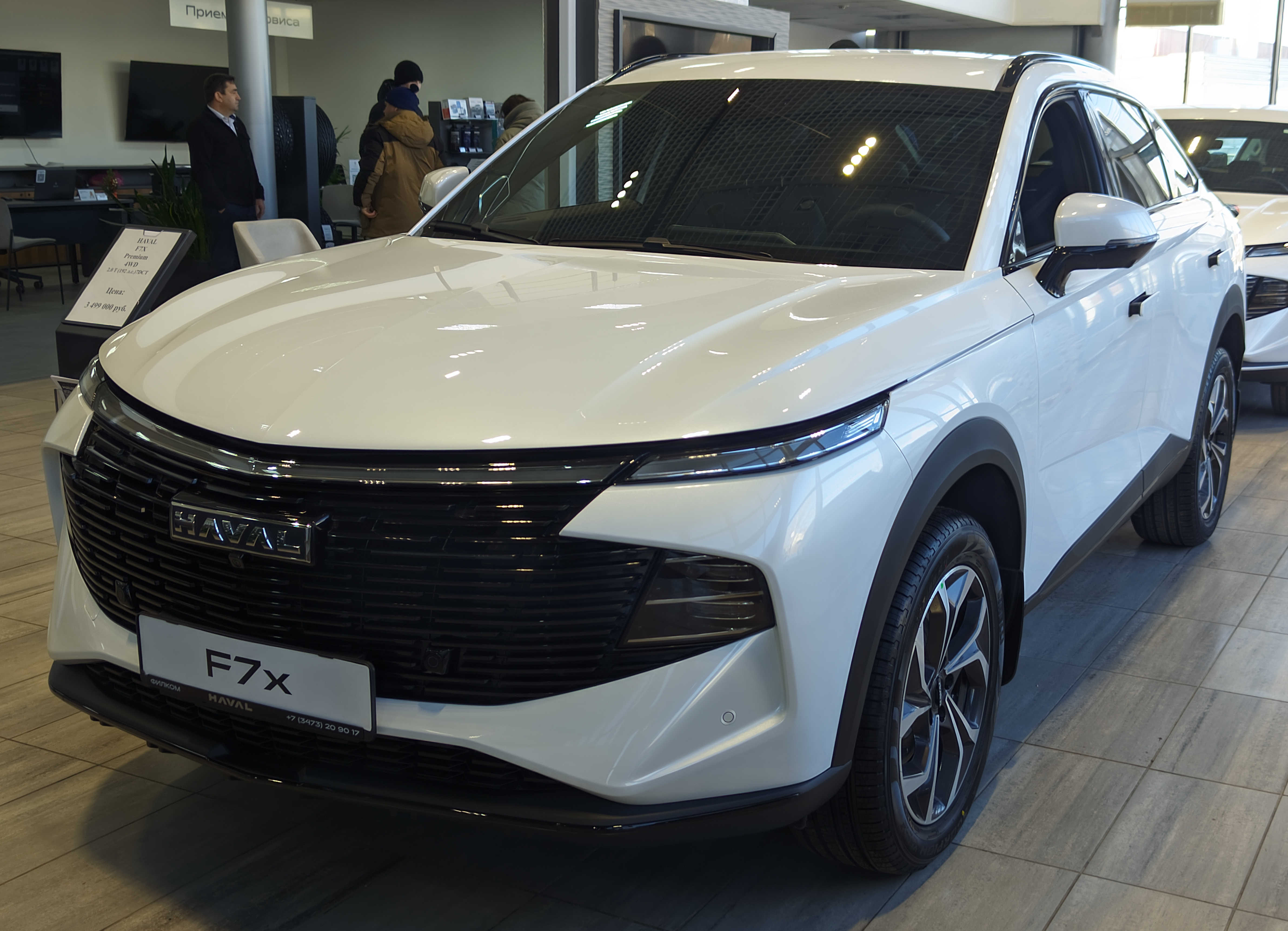
Haval F7x II

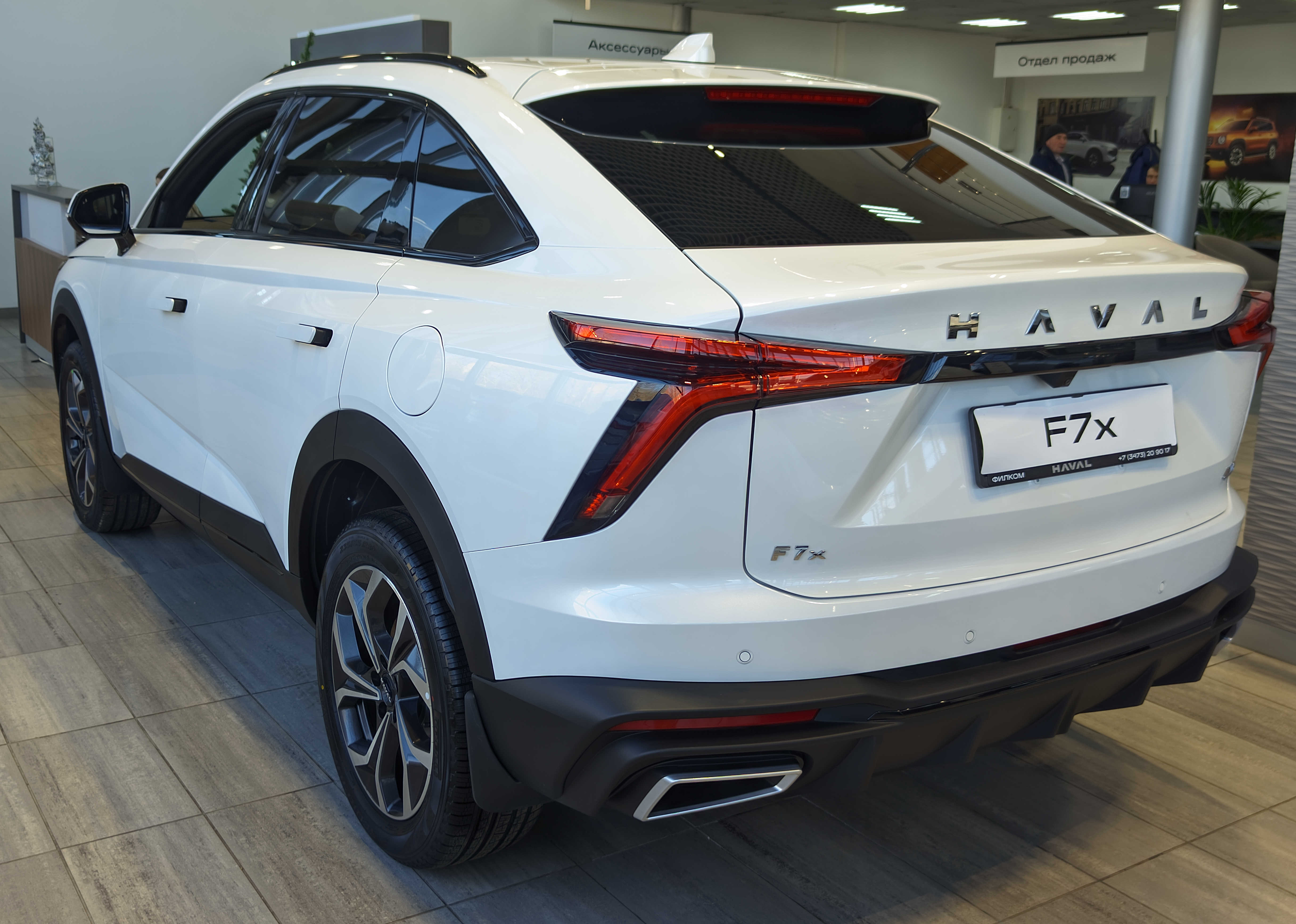
Rear view
