= Mahindra Rodeo =

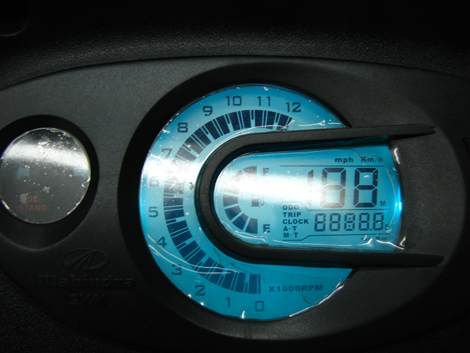
Mahindra Rodeo Tachometer

The Mahindra Rodeo is one of the three scooters produced by Mahindra since 2009.

Mahindra Rodeo is a 125 cc gearless power scooter and incorporates technological and design input from Taiwan's SYM & Italy's Engines Engineering. Rodeo is supplied with telescopic suspension. The manufacturer has also included a tachometer and a digital console incorporating a trip meter, clock, and a USB mobile phone charger.

== Rodeo RZ ==
In June 2012, Mahindra two wheelers unveiled Rodeo RZ, a new model of Mahindra Rodeo having high ground clearance, advanced telescopic suspension, more mileage and many other features.

== Rodeo UZO ==
In August 2014, Mahindra two wheelers unveiled Rodeo UZO.
