= Mahindra Centuro =

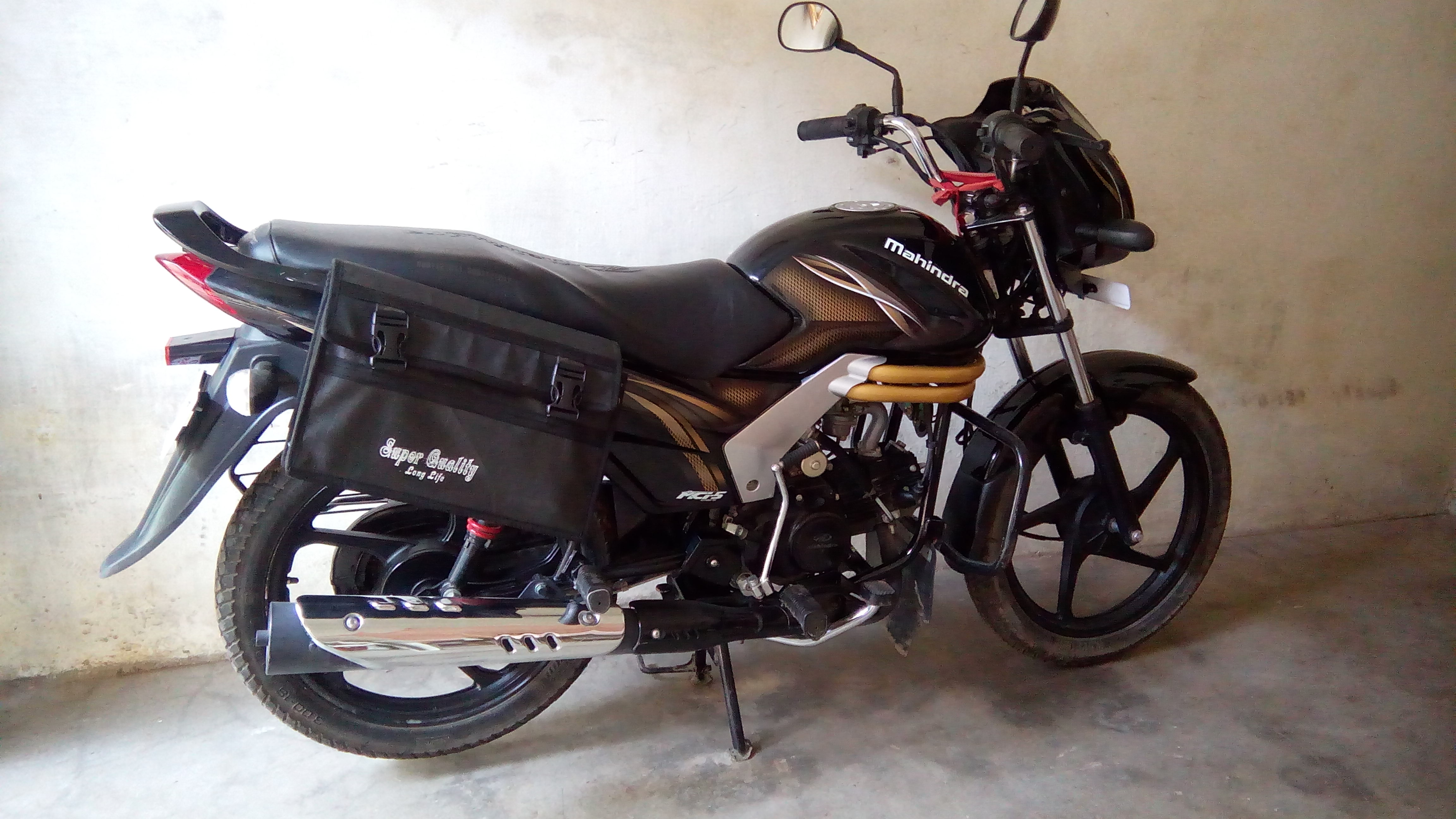
- Manufacturer: Mahindra Two Wheelers
- Parent company: Mahindra Group
- Class: Standard
- Engine: 106.7 cc (6.51 cu in), 4-stroke, air-cooled, MCi-5 (Micro Chip Ignited-5 curve) single
- Transmission: 4-speed constant mesh
- Brakes: Front: drum, rear: drum
- Tires: Front: 2.75 × 18, Rear: 3 × 18
- Wheelbase: 1,265 mm (49.8 in)
- Dimensions: L: 2,031 mm (80.0 in); W: 735 mm (28.9 in)
- Seat height: 800 mm (31 in)
- Fuel capacity: 12.7 L (2.8 imp gal; 3.4 US gal)
- Related: Mahindra Pantero

Mahindra Centuro is a 110cc Motorcycle manufactured in India by Mahindra Two Wheelers. The Centuro gets a remote lock with a flip key, the remote lock uses a 96-bit secure access just like four wheelers. The bike was designed and developed from at Mahindra's R&D facility in Pune.

== Engine ==
Under the tank of the Centuro, there is an indigenously developed, 108.0 CC, MCi-5 (Micro Chip Ignited-5 Curve) single-cylinder, air-cooled four-stroke motor developing 8.4PS and a four-speed manual transmission. The bike has a five-step rear suspension. It produces 8.5 bhp at 8500 rpm and a maximum torque of 8.5 Nm at 5500 rpm, with a 0-60 kmph time of 8.9 seconds.

== Anti-theft key ==
A notable feature of the Mahindra Centuro is a Central Locking Anti-Theft System with Engine Immobilizer and multifunctional (car-like) flip key with 96-bit encryption, a first for motorcycles manufactured in India.

== Find-me lamp ==
The bike key can be used to start follow-me-home lights that stay on for while after the key is removed from the ignition, flashing lights with an alarm that aids with locating the motorcycle in crowded parking lots, and a LED torch on the key to help find the ignition slot when in a poorly lit area.

== Fully lit digital dashboard ==
The bike sports a digital dashboard which is divided into three parts. The left part hosts the DTE and the fuel gauge. The middle has a big-font digital speedometer with one indicator each for service due and for economy mode. The right toggles between a trip meter, odometer and a clock.

== Mileage ==
The Centuro has a claimed ARAI certified fuel-efficiency of 60 kmpl comes with a five-year warranty.

== Availability ==
Mahindra stopped producing the Centuro in July 2016 due to declining sales figures and a strategy shift to middleweight motorcycles after acquiring Jawa, BSA and Yezdi.
