= Mahindra Maxximo =

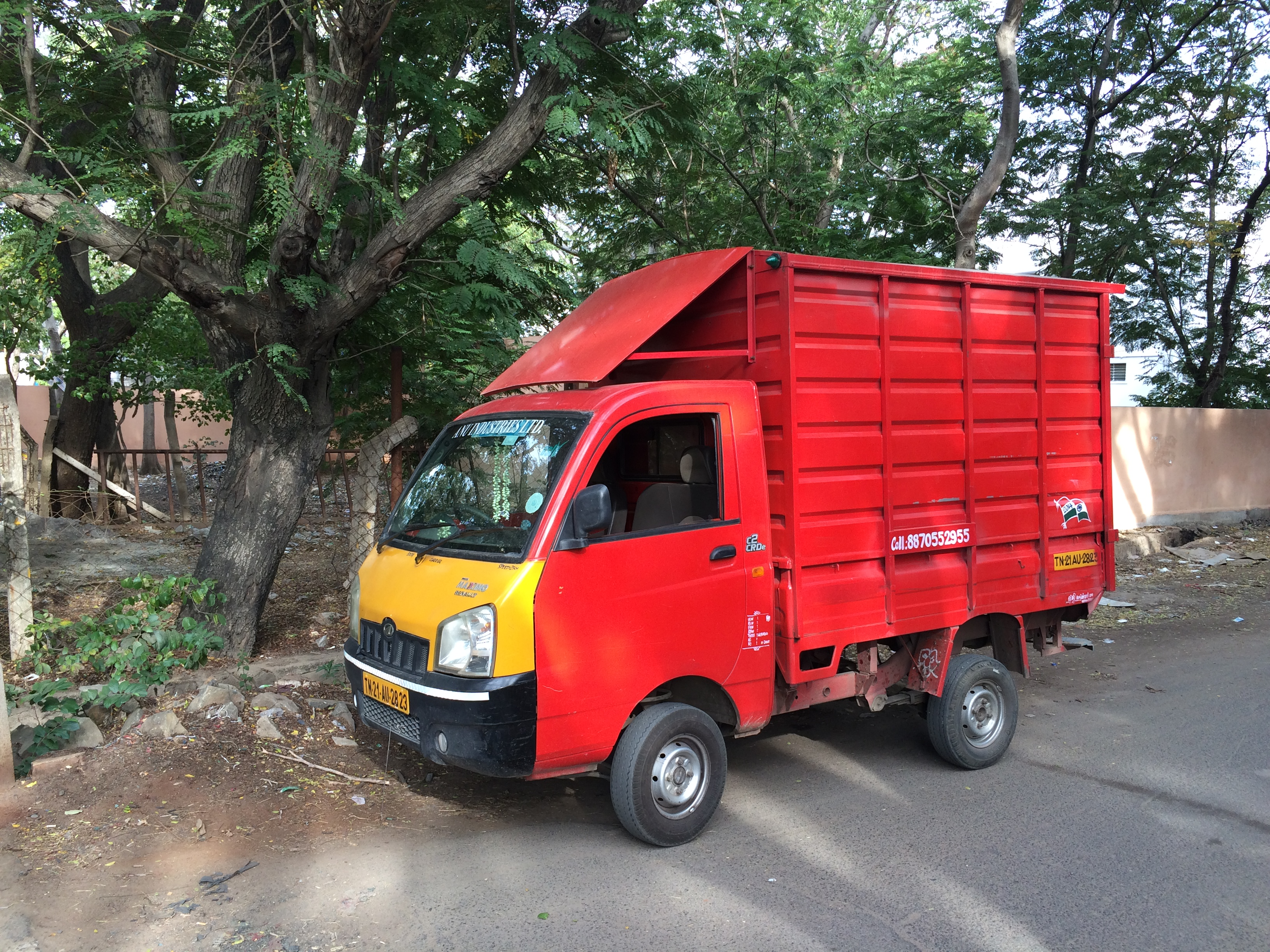

Overview
- Manufacturer: Mahindra & Mahindra Limited
- Production: 2010-2015

Body and chassis
- Class: Mini truck Microvan
- Body style: 2-door pickup; 4-door van
- Related: Mahindra Supro

Powertrain
- Engine: 909 cc diesel
- Transmission: 4-speed manual

Dimensions
- Length: 3,800 mm (149.6 in)
- Width: 1,540 mm (60.6 in)
- Height: 1,900 mm (74.8 in)
- Curb weight: 1,800 kg (4,000 lb)

Chronology
- Successor: Mahindra Supro

The Mahindra Maxximo is a mini truck and a microvan that was manufactured by the Indian automaker Mahindra & Mahindra.

It is powered by a 909 cc diesel engine, the Plus model produces a 19.2 PS (19 hp; 14 kW). The Maxximo can reach up to 70 km/h (43 mph) and is widely used by the middle class. The mini truck version is offered in two variants: Plus and CNG.

On 16 October 2015, the Maxximo was replaced by an updated version, known as the Mahindra Supro. In January 2024 Mahindra launched a new version of the Supro known as the Mahindra Supro Excel.

== Specifications ==
- Engine capacity 909 cc
- Power 26 hp @ 3600 rpm
- Max engine torque 5.5 kg⋅m @ 1800-2200 rpm
- Fuel tank capacity 33 L
- Clutch and transmission Clutch Single plate dry type
- Gearbox Manual 4+1
- Steering Power Steering with Rack & pinion
- Suspension
  - Front: MacPherson strut independent suspension
  - Rear: Leaf Spring
- Brakes
  - Front "Disc brake"
  - Rear Drum Brakes
- Wheels & Tyres Tyres 165 R14 & 175 LT 8PR
- Dimensions
  - Wheelbase 1950 mm
  - Length 3800 mm
  - Width 1540&nbdp:mm
  - Height 1900 mm
- Load body dimensions 2280 mm × 1540 mm × 330 mm
- Weights GVW 1815 kg
  - Payload 850 kg

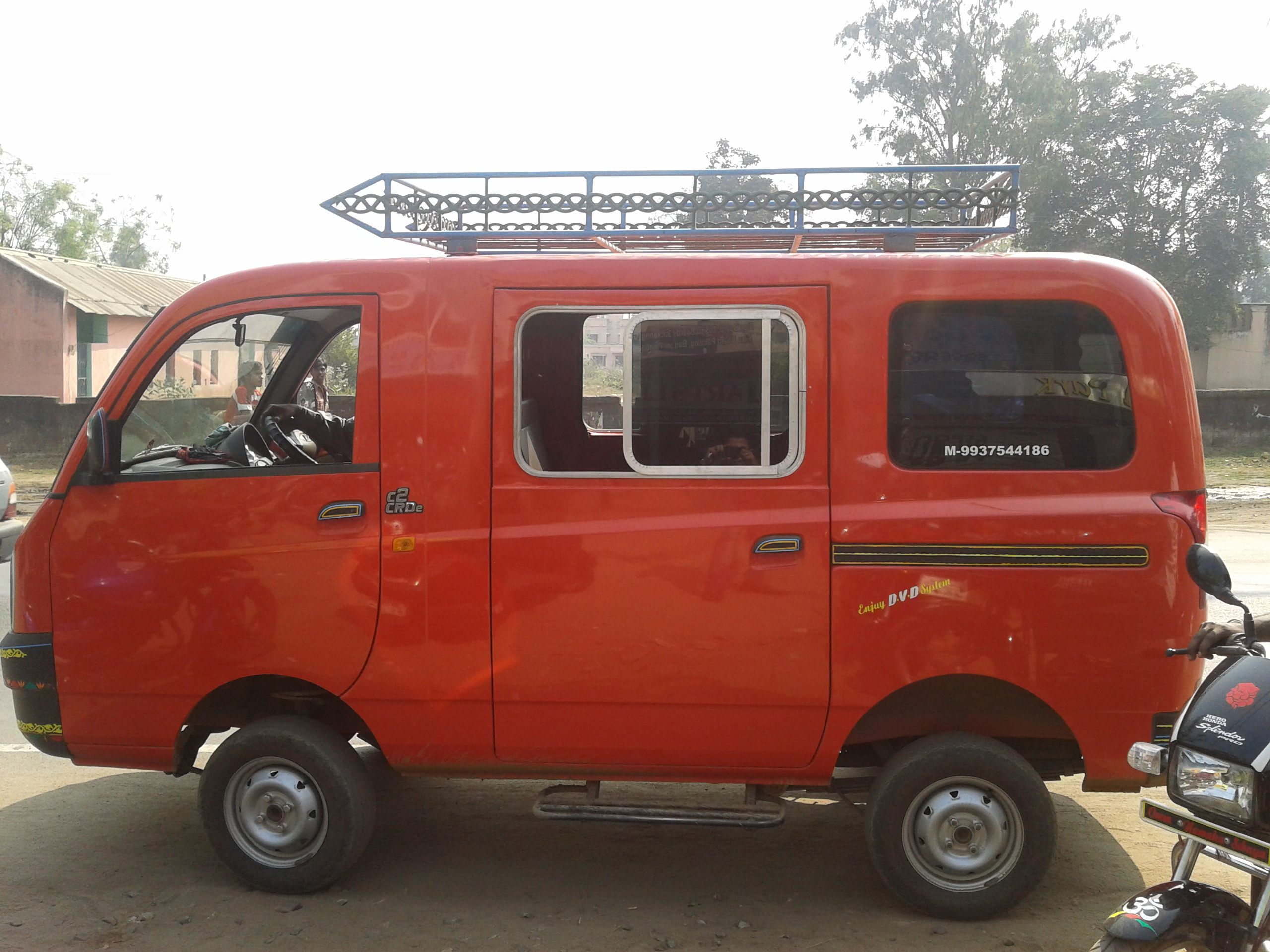
Mahindra Maxximo passenger carrier version
