= Peugeot Speedfight =

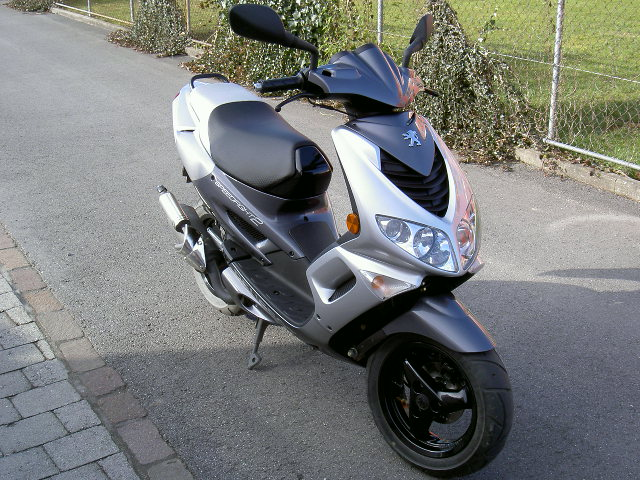
- Peugeot Speedfight 2
- Manufacturer: Peugeot Motocycles
- Also called: Naza Flash
- Production: 1996–present
- Assembly: Mandeure, France; Jinan, China
- Class: Scooter
- Engine: 50 cc (3.1 cu in) or 100 cc (6.1 cu in), two-stroke, single

The Peugeot Speedfight is a scooter made by Peugeot Motocycles. It is available in 50 cc (3.1 cu in) and 100 cc (6.1 cu in) models, with the 50 cc moped model being used by holders of restricted licences worldwide. It is available in air- or more expensive liquid-cooled versions.

The Speedfight is rebadged in Malaysia as Naza Flash, with some different body panels and larger displacement.

The Speedfight 2 was introduced in 2001 after the success of the original model. The designs of the front panel, rear panel and light are different on the two models. The Speedfight 2 is available in air-cooled and liquid-cooled variants. The model was also equipped with anti-dive front suspension

The Peugeot Speedfight 2 2000-2004 has a Gurtner carburetor instead of a Dell'Orto carburetor.

Peugeot released the Speedfight 3 in 2009, followed by the Speedfight 4 in 2014, with mainly cosmetic changes, which was also available in both air- and liquid-cooled variants.

== Engine ==
The Speedfight 1 and 2 were equipped with either an air-cooled or liquid-cooled 50cc 2-stroke engine with a vertical cylinder or a 100cc air-cooled 2 stroke engine with a vertical cylinder. Both 50cc air- and liquid-cooled engines shared the same bottom end, where as the 100cc engine has a tougher connecting rod, crankshaft, among other things.

The Speedfight 3 and 4 featured a horizontal cylinder 50cc 2 stroke engine, equipped with an electronic oil injection pump made by Dell'Orto, among various other design improvements. This engine was also shared in various other Peugeot scooters, like the Peugeot Ludix, Jet Force, New Vivacity, Streetzone, etc. The Speedfight 3 and 4 also came with a 50cc 4 stroke engine, a derivative of the popular GY6 4 stroke scooter engine. In the Speedfight 3 and 4, it seems to match the 4 stroke 50cc engines made by SYM, due to various engine parts being compatible with the ones found on SYM's engines.

50cc (3.1 cu in) Air/Liquid cooled 2-stroke
Technical details	Speedfight 1/2	Speedfight 3/4
Bore	40.0mm	40.0mm
Stroke	39.1mm	39.4mm
Fuel system	Dell'Orto PHBN 12mm(1996–2000) Gurtner 12mm flange-mount carburettor(2000–2004)	Gurtner 12mm carburettor(similar to Dell'Orto PHBN 12mm)
Lubrication system	Crankshaft-driven oil injection pump	Dell'Orto electronic oil injection pump

50cc (3.1 cu in) Air-cooled 4-stroke, 2-valve
Technical details	Speedfight 3/4
Bore	39.0mm
Stroke	41,4mm
Fuel system	Keihin CVK 18,5mm
Lubrication system	Forced dry-sump oil lubrication

100cc (6.1 cu in) Air-cooled 2-stroke
Technical details	Speedfight 1/2
Bore	50.6mm
Stroke	49,7mm
Fuel system	Dell'Orto PHA 17,5mm ES
Lubrication system	Crankshaft-driven, throttle controlled oil injection pump

== Gallery ==
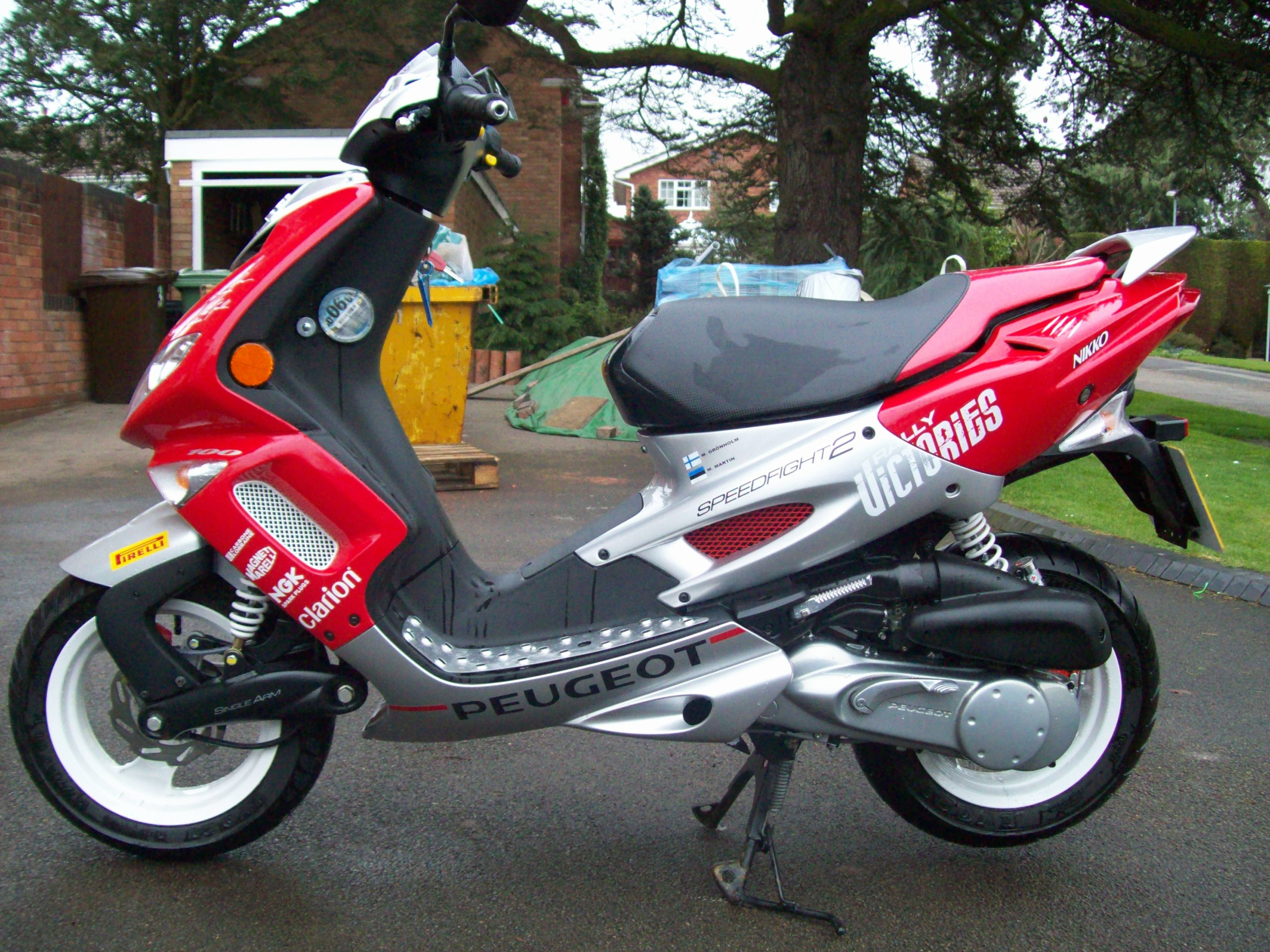
Peugeot Speedfight

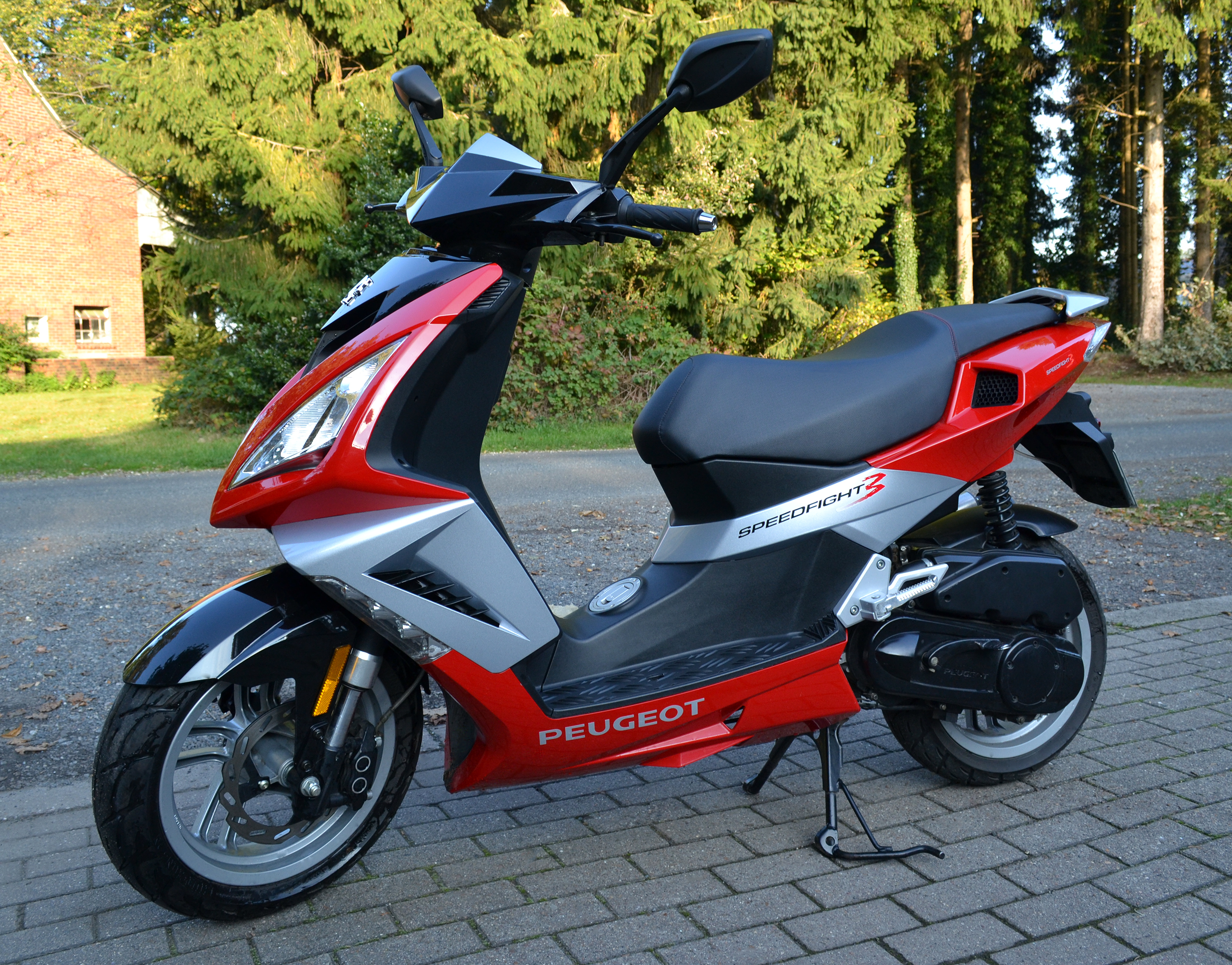
Speedfight 3

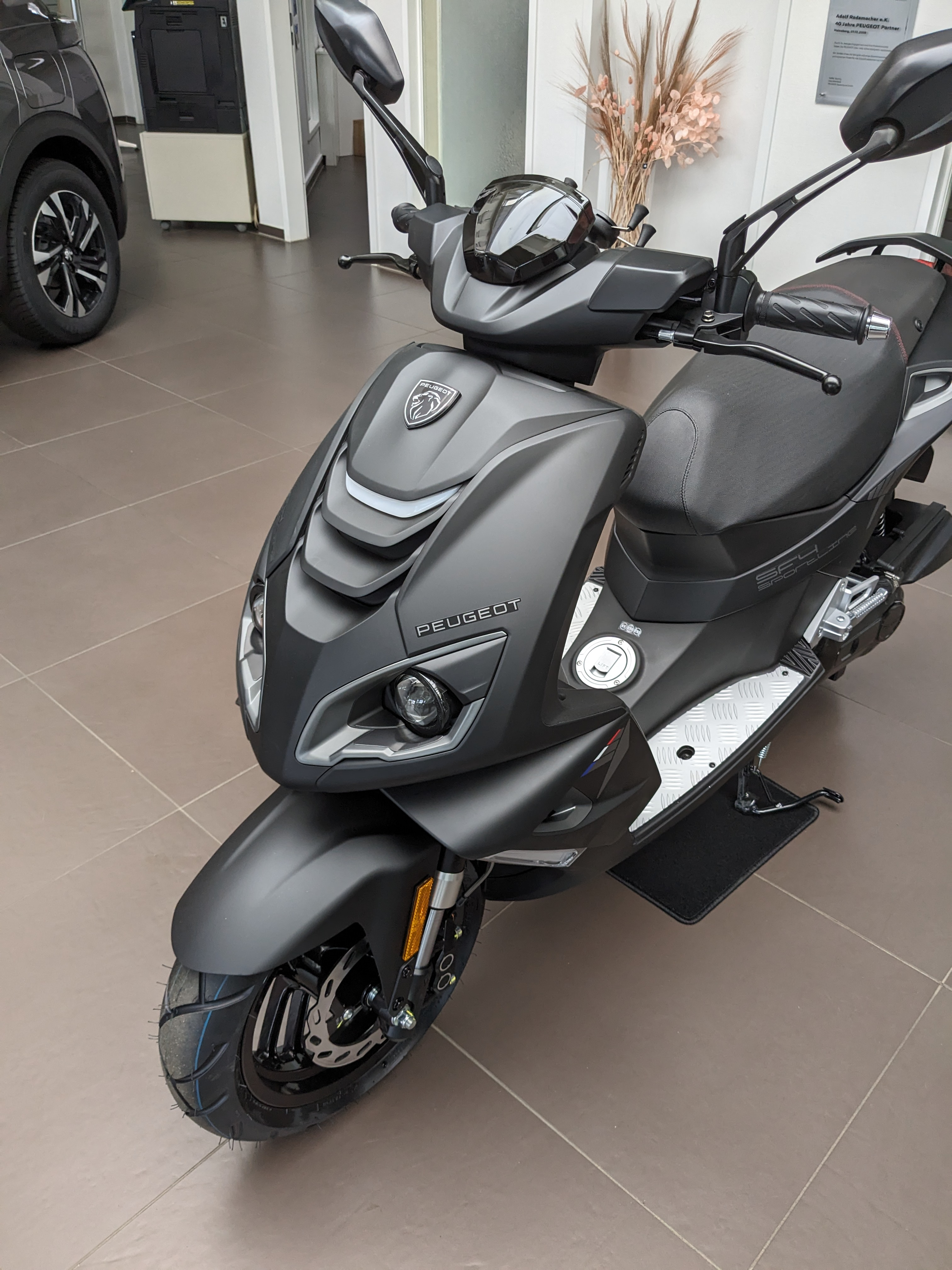
Speedfight 4 Sportline
