= Peugeot Motocycles =

French manufacturer of motorcycles

Peugeot Motocycles S.A.
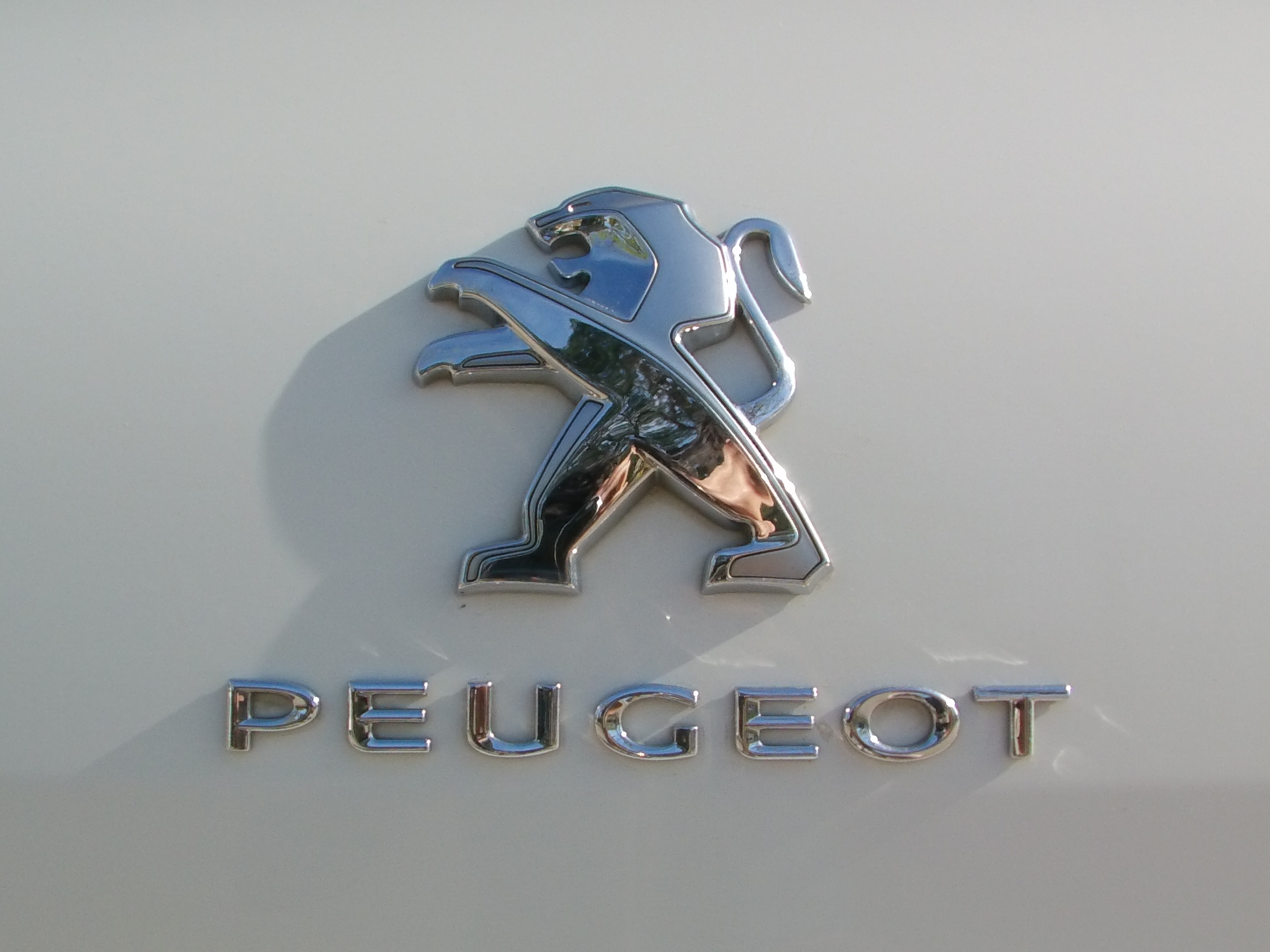
- Type: Subsidiary (Peugeot)
- Founded: Founded in France in 1898; 128 years ago
- Founder: Armand Peugeot
- Headquarters: France
- Area served: Worldwide
- Products: Scooter (motorcycle)
- Parent: Mutares (2023–present)
- Website: peugeot-motorcycles.com

Peugeot Motocycles is a French manufacturer of scooters and small motorcycles. Since February 2023, the company has been controlled by the German holding company Mutares.

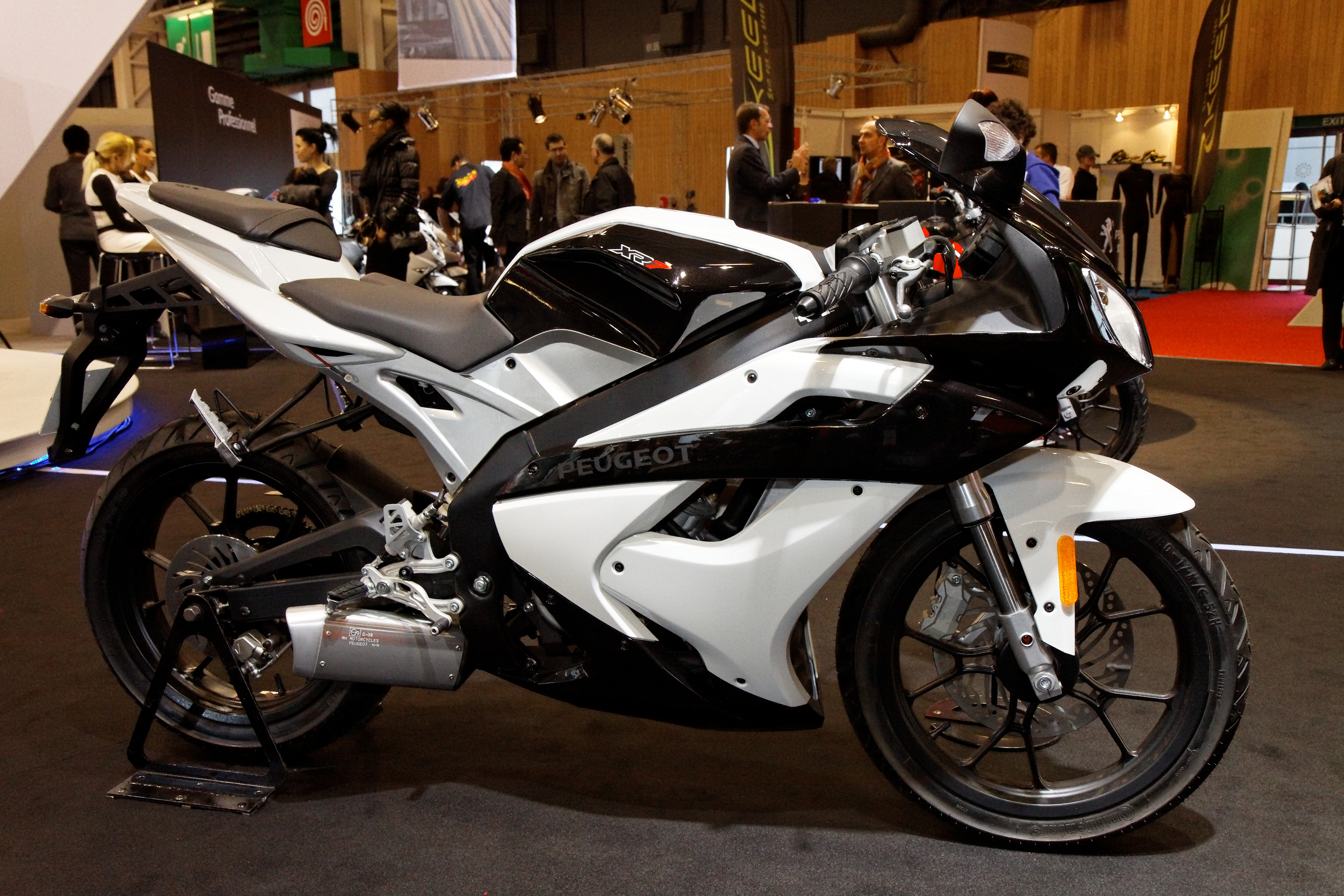
2011 Peugeot XR7

== History ==
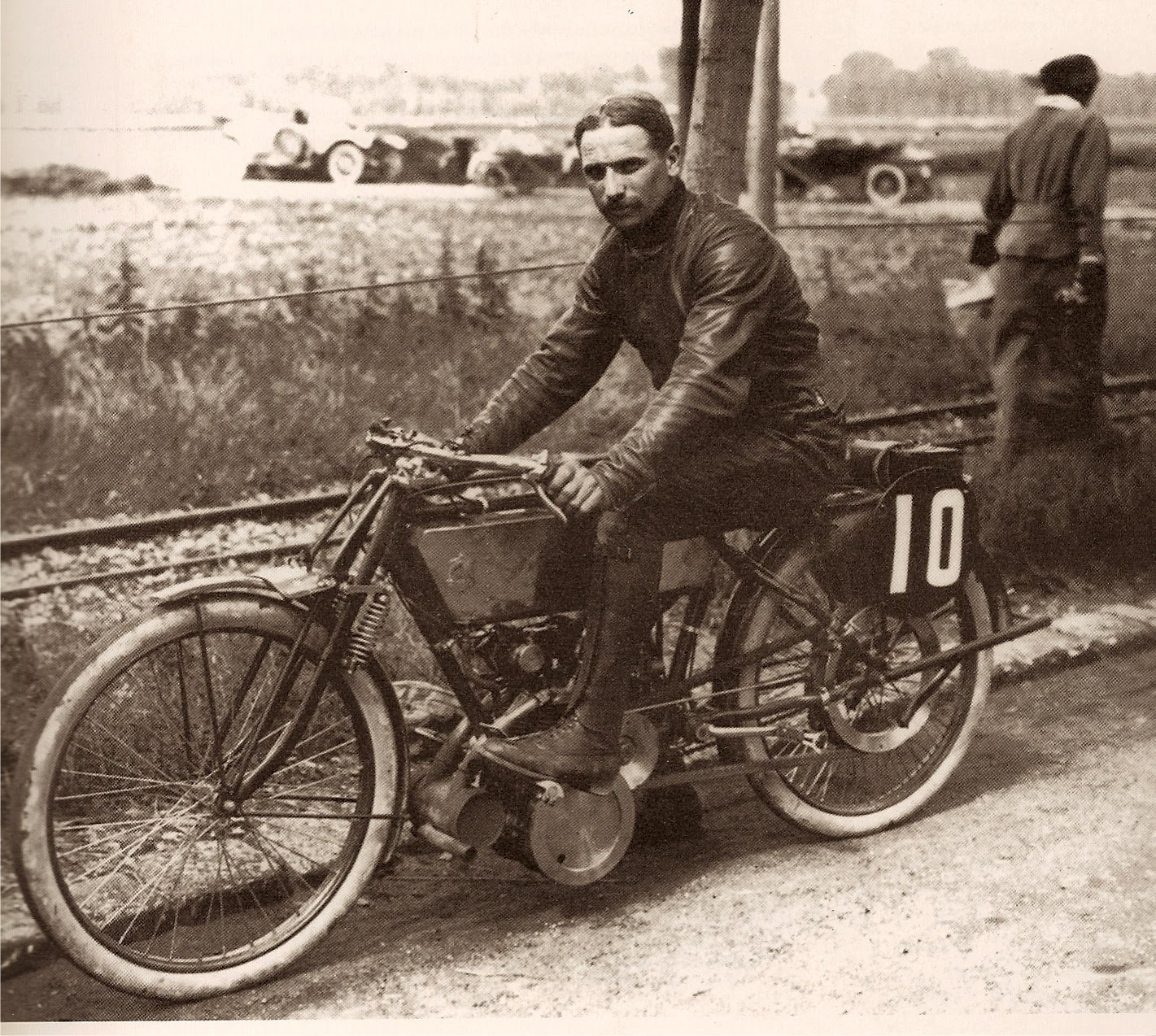
Peugeot 500 M c. 1913 or 1914

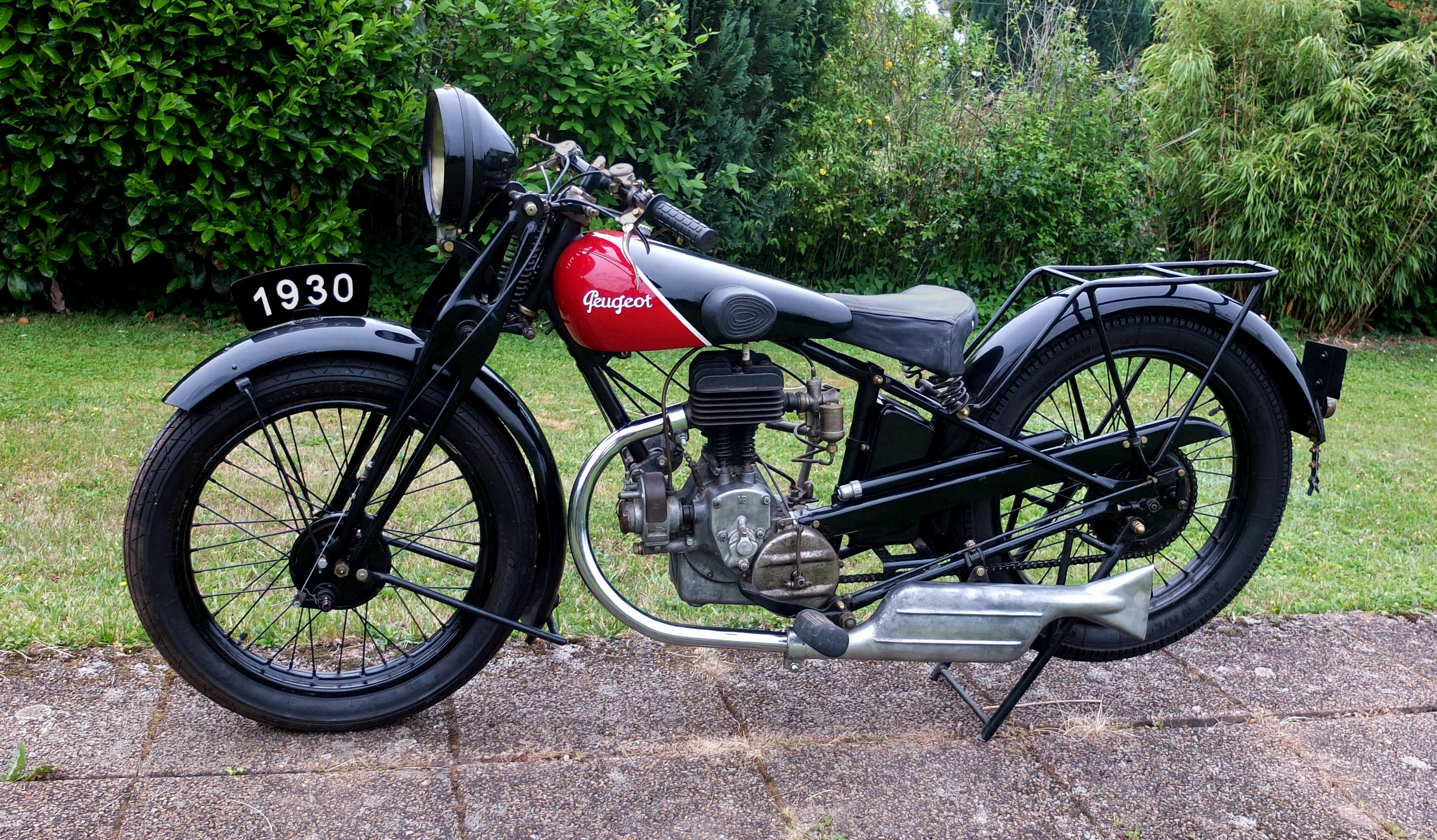
Peugeot P110 1930

Peugeot built their first motorcycle in 1898 with a De Dion-Bouton engine mounted on the rear wheel. This model was shown at the 1898 Paris Exhibition but was not put into production. Peugeot did produce a tricycle in 1898 although most of the machine was actually manufactured by De Dion-Bouton.

In 1900 Peugeot started to manufacture quadricycles but these fell out of favor and ceased to be produced by 1903. In 1901, spurred on by the success of the French built Werner Brothers and Company Motobicyclette, Peugeot produced their own motorcycle using a Swiss made Zürcher and Lüthi (ZL) engine. The Peugeot 500 M, a 500 cc (31 cu in) dual overhead camshaft model appeared in 1914, the first of this type. In 1930, Peugeot absorbed Automoto which had been a pioneer in the field of motorcycles and scooters. Peugeot was the leading French motorcycle manufacturer until the 1950s producing many models.

In June 1981 an agreement was signed with Honda which provided for the purchase of Japanese two-stroke engines, variator transmission and electrical components to be installed in the Peugeot scooter.

In 1983 the new Peugeot SC was officially presented, the first scooter with plastic body of the French company equipped with a 50 and 80 cm³ two-stroke Honda engines and automatic gearbox; this mechanism derives from the Honda Lead (NH), produced in Japan from the previous year. On October 1, 1984 Honda enters the capital of Peugeot MTC by purchasing 25% of the shares; the PSA Group remains the largest shareholder with 75% ownership. The alliance with Honda will continue throughout the nineties, in fact the Japanese engines will also be used on the next Peugeot SV scooter, heir to the previous SC. In 2000 Peugeot will also market the Honda Foresight 250 scooter (produced in Atessa by Honda Industriale Italia) under its own brand as Peugeot SV 250.

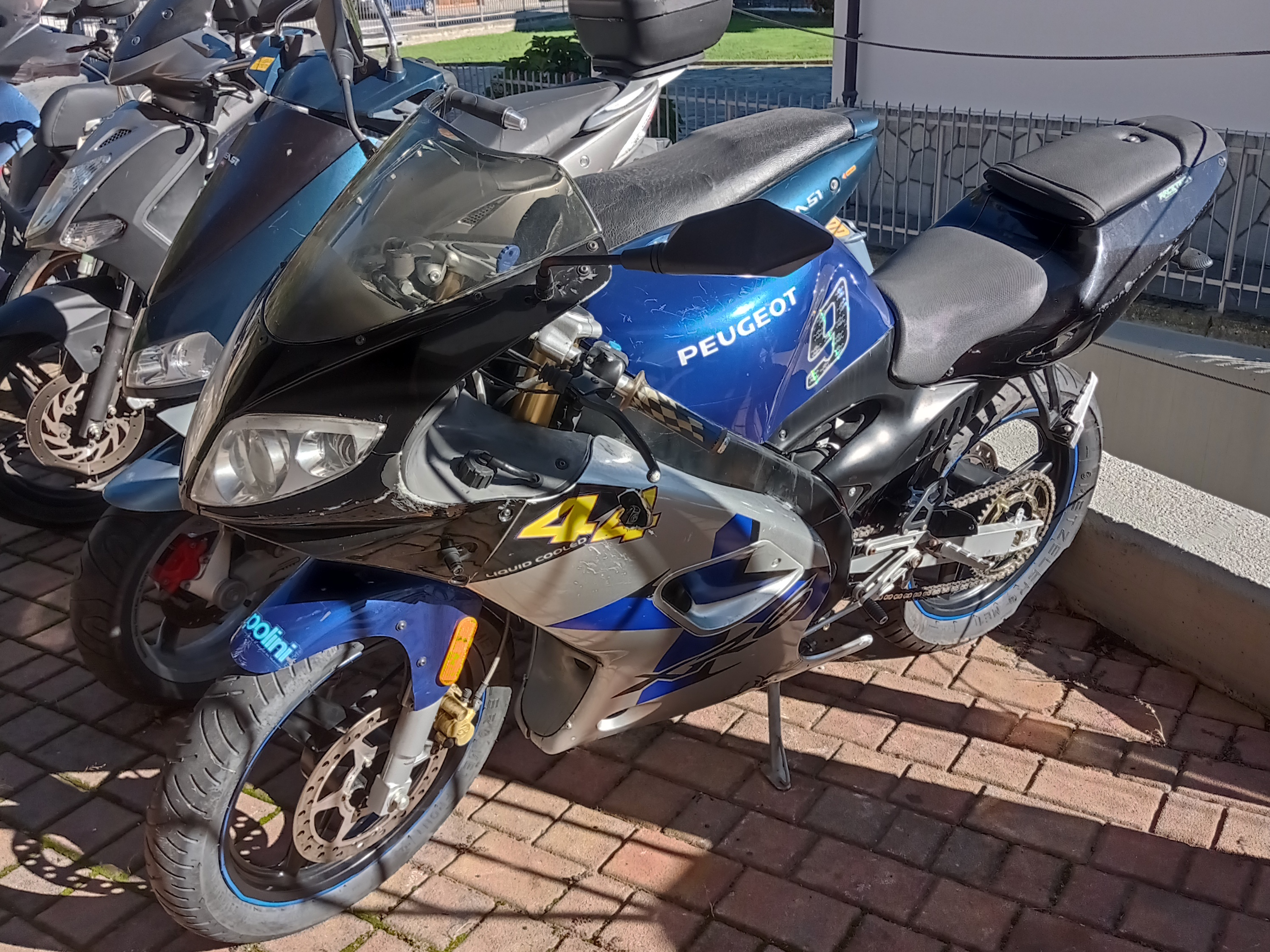
2003 Peugeot XR6

On October 28, 2006, the "Jinan Qingqi Peugeot Motorcycle" was founded, a 50-50 joint venture between Peugeot Motocycles and Jinan Qingqi for the production of scooters in a new complex in Jinan intended for mainly European exports. The first models produced in China were the Peugeot 103 “Vogue” and the Kisbee, Citystar and V-Click scooters. Subsequently, the production of the Ludix and Django models was started.

In 2008 an agreement was signed with Sanyang Industry (SYM) for the production of scooters from 2009. This agreement provides for the supply of SYM technologies to Peugeot, specifically the Peugeot Tweet and LXR models are launched which are strictly derived respectively from the Taiwanese models SYM Symphony and SYM HD produced in China by SYM. The differences between the Taiwanese and French models are in a few design elements.

In December 2012, the Dannemarie engine plant where the 50 and 125 engines were manufactured was closed. Part of the production was relocated to China at the Jinan plant of the Qingqi-Peugeot Motocycles joint venture.

In October 2014, Mahindra and Mahindra acquired a 51% controlling stake in the company. PSA Group kept 49% stake in the company as well as the use of its brand image.

Peugeot currently produces scooters and 3-wheelers with engines ranging from 50 to 500cc. It operates 2 production sites at Mandeure, France and Jinan, China. Peugeot scooters are sold in 60 countries. M&M subsequently acquired a 100% stake in 2019.

In November 2022, Munich-based private equity firm Mutares acquired 50% equity and 80% controlling stake in Peugeot Motocycles. In February 2023, Mutares completed the acquisition of the company.

In June 2023 Peugeot Motocycles and DAB Motors signed a partnership for the production and distribution of electric motorcycles; specifically, Peugeot will produce future DAB models in its Mandeure factory. Production of the electric motorcycle DAB 1α starts in 2024.

In October 2025, Peugeot Motocycles enters into a partnership with the manufacturer Sherco, under which Sherco will supply motorcycles to be sold under the Peugeot brand; the first model unveiled at EICMA 2025 is the new Peugeot XP6 (Enduro and Supermotard versions).

== Past and present models ==
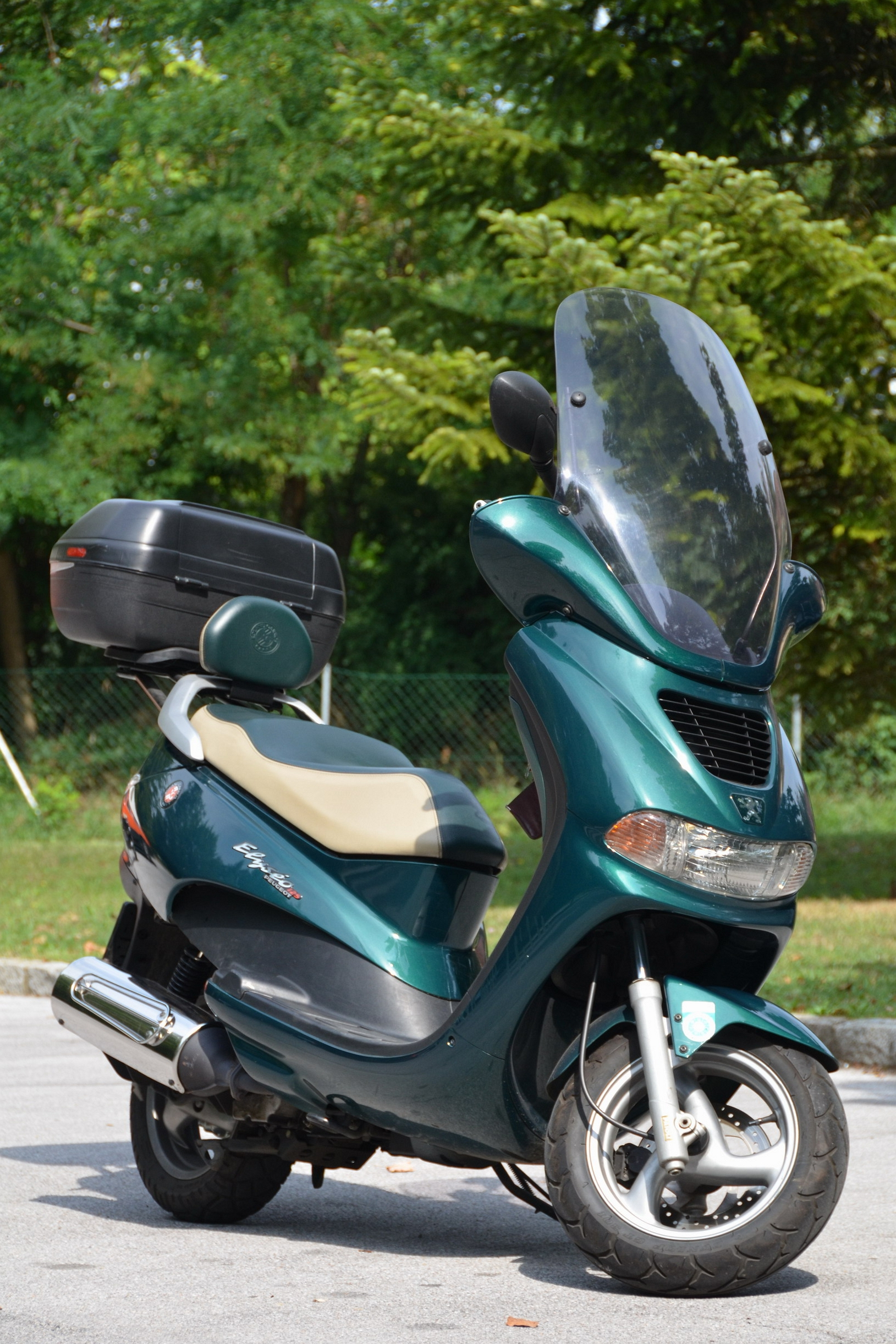
Peugeot Elyséo 125, 'Roland Garros' (2002)

=== Mopeds ===
Peugeot 103

- Peugeot 101
- Peugeot 102
- Peugeot 103, produced from 1972, with different models (LSMs, SP, Land, Chrono, Electronics, TLX, RCX, Clip, Vogue, FXR, CRX, TSM and others)

=== Scooters ===
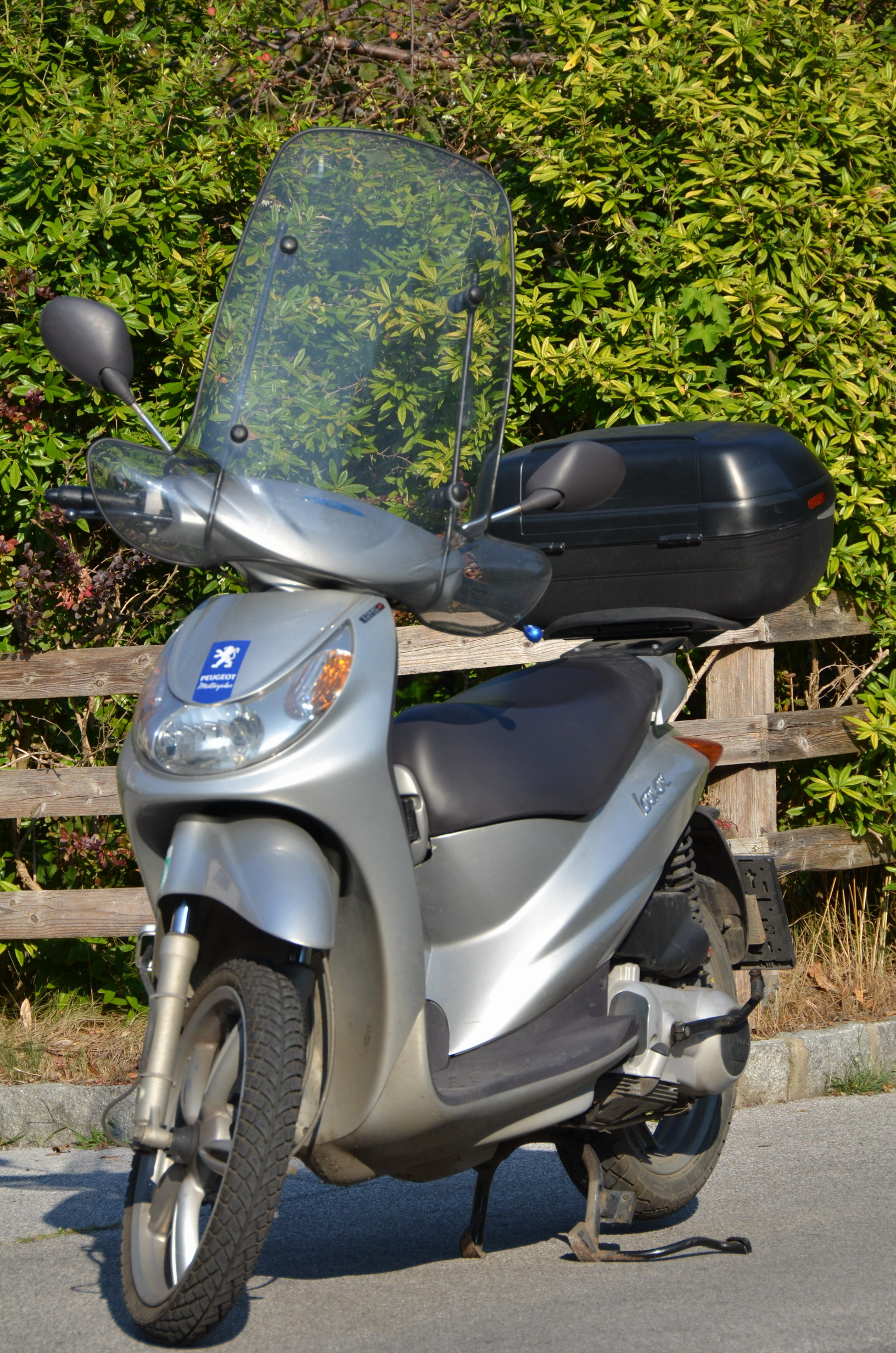
Peugeot Looxor 125

- Peugeot S55
- Peugeot S57
- Peugeot SC/SX
- Peugeot ST/Rapido
- Peugeot SV
- Peugeot Buxy
- Peugeot Speedake
- Peugeot Squab
- Peugeot Scoot'Elec
- Peugeot Speedfight
- Peugeot Elyseo
- Peugeot Elystar
- Peugeot Looxor
- Peugeot JetForce
- Peugeot Ludix
- Peugeot Satelis
- Peugeot Satelis Compressor
- Peugeot Sum Up
- Peugeot Tweet
- Peugeot Vivacity
- Peugeot Kisbee
- Peugeot Citystar
- Peugeot e-Vivacity
- Peugeot Metropolis 400
- Peugeot Streetzone
- Peugeot V-Clic
- Peugeot Django
- Peugeot Sum-Up 125
- Peugeot Belville
- Peugeot Pulsion
- Peugeot SpeedFight

=== Motorcycles ===
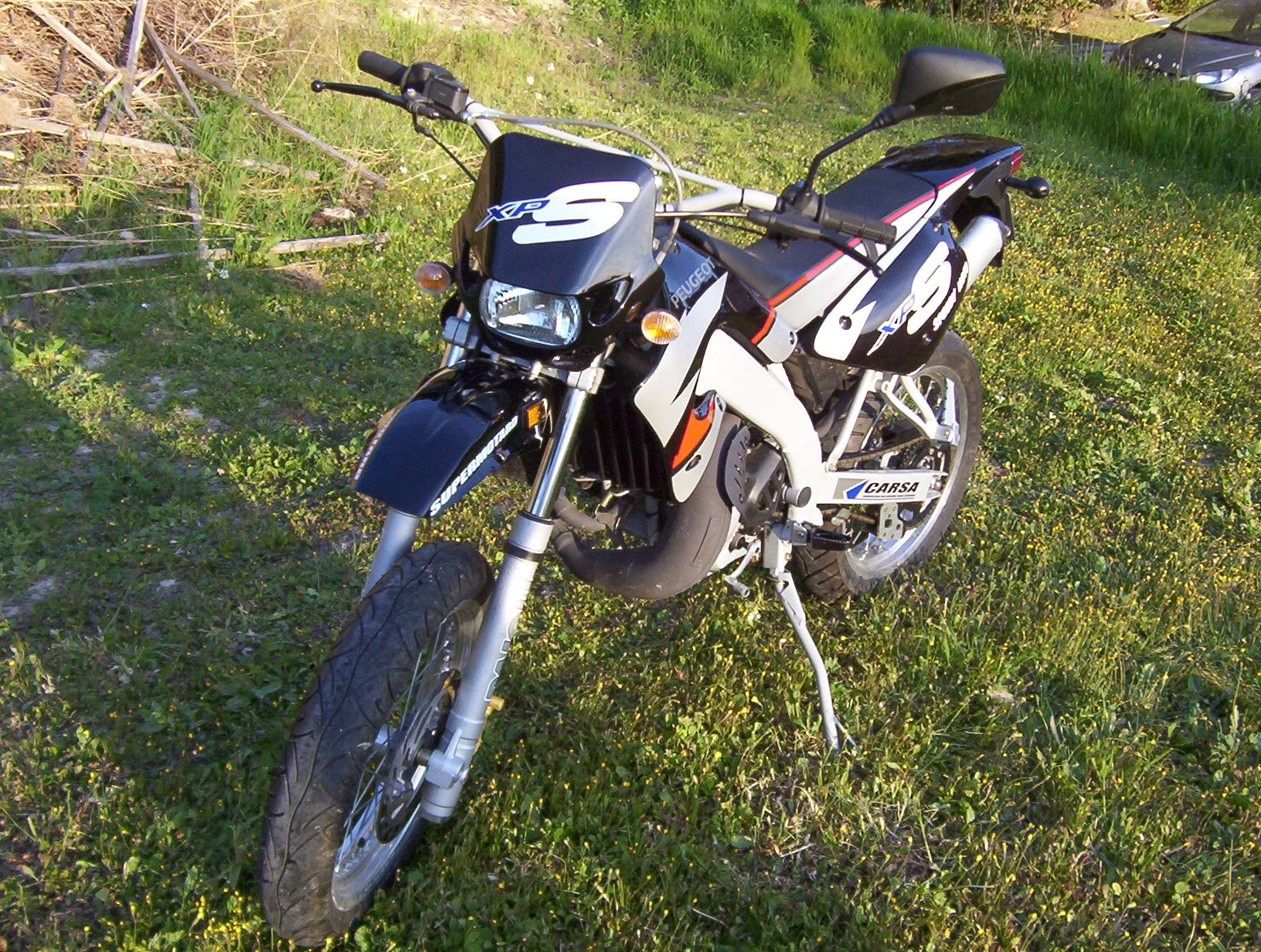
Peugeot XPS

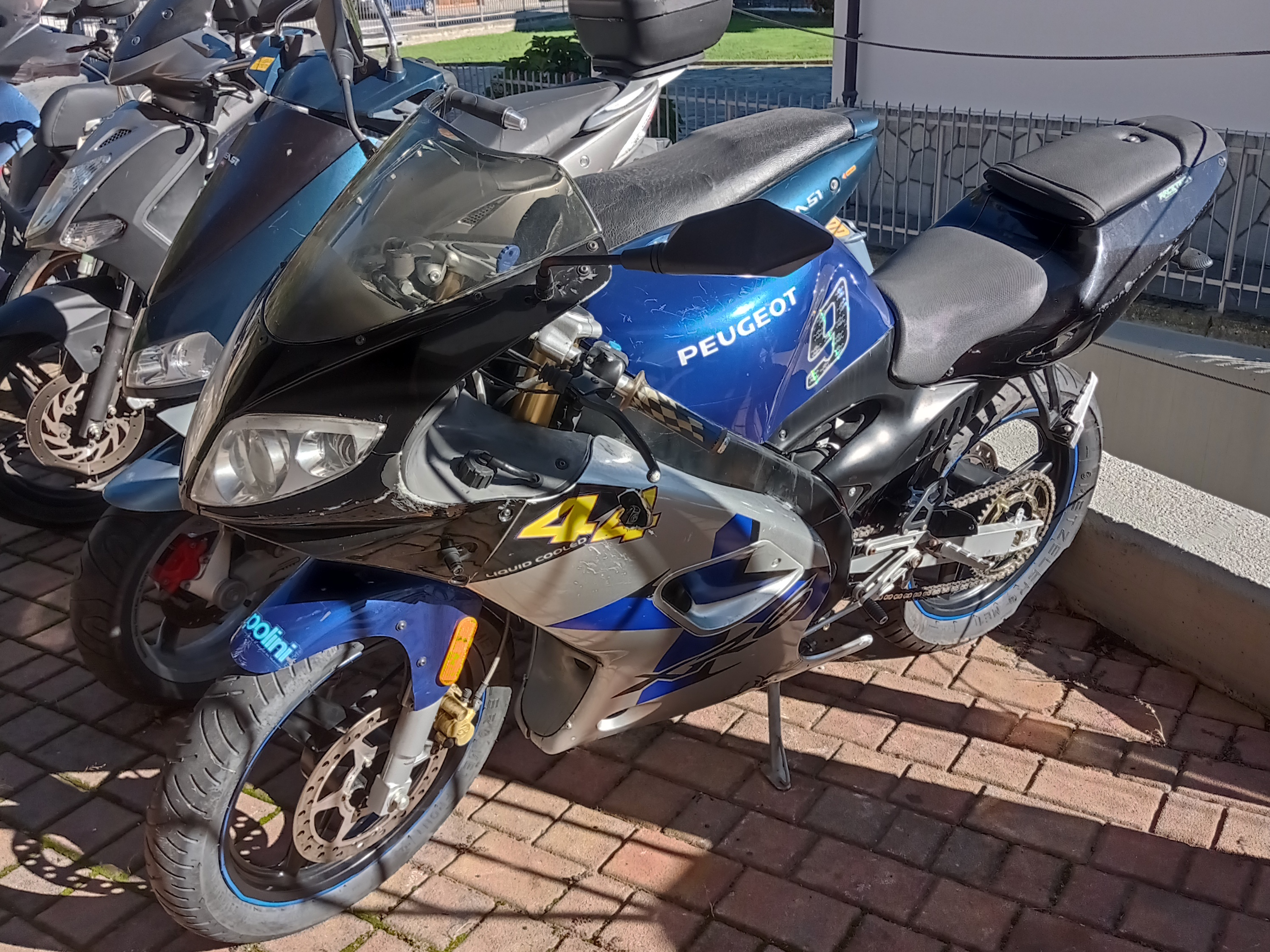
Peugeot XR6

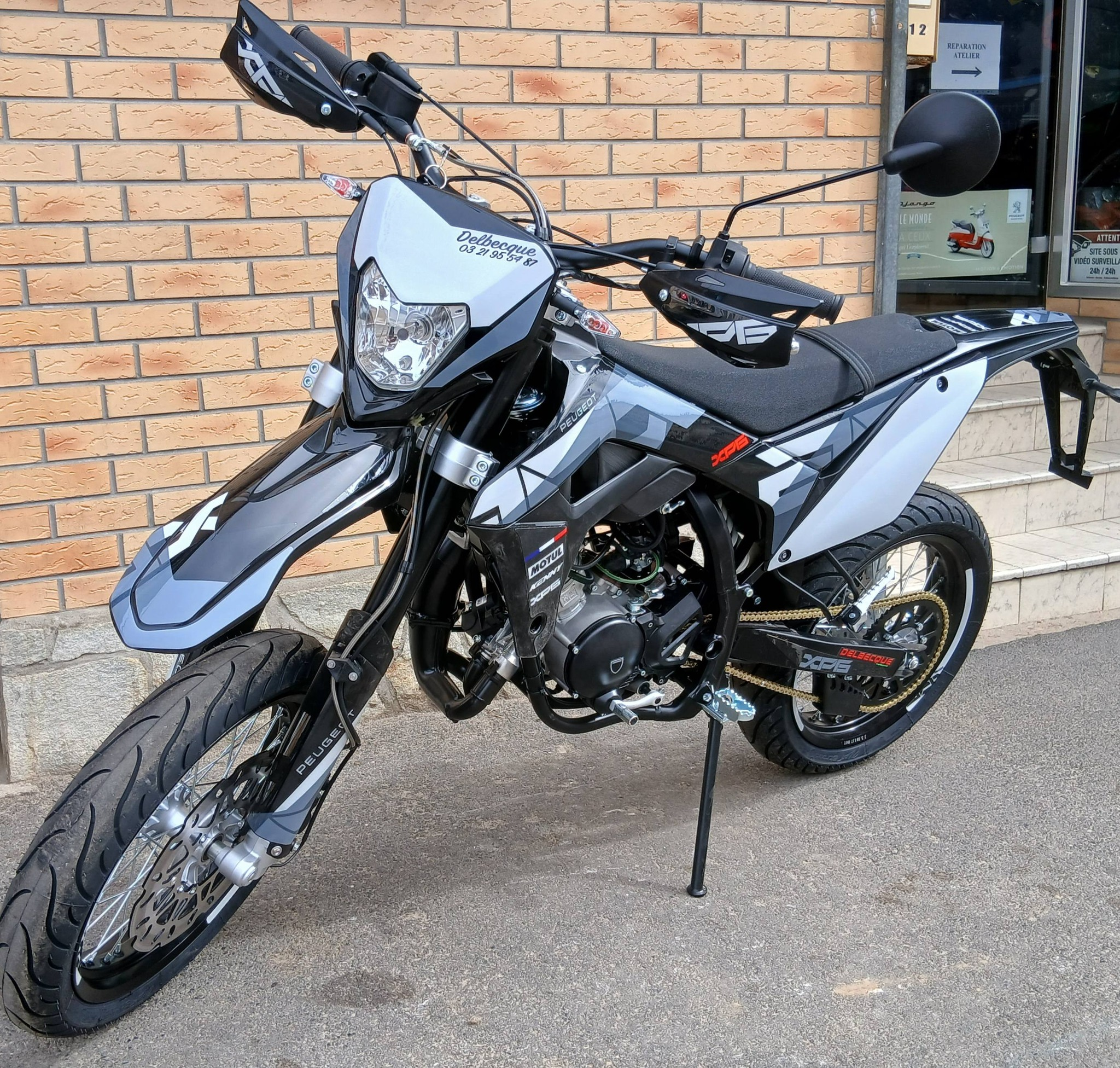
Peugeot XP6

- Peugeot 500 M
- Peugeot TLX
- Peugeot XP6
- Peugeot XPS
- Peugeot XR6
- Peugeot XR7

== Motorsports ==
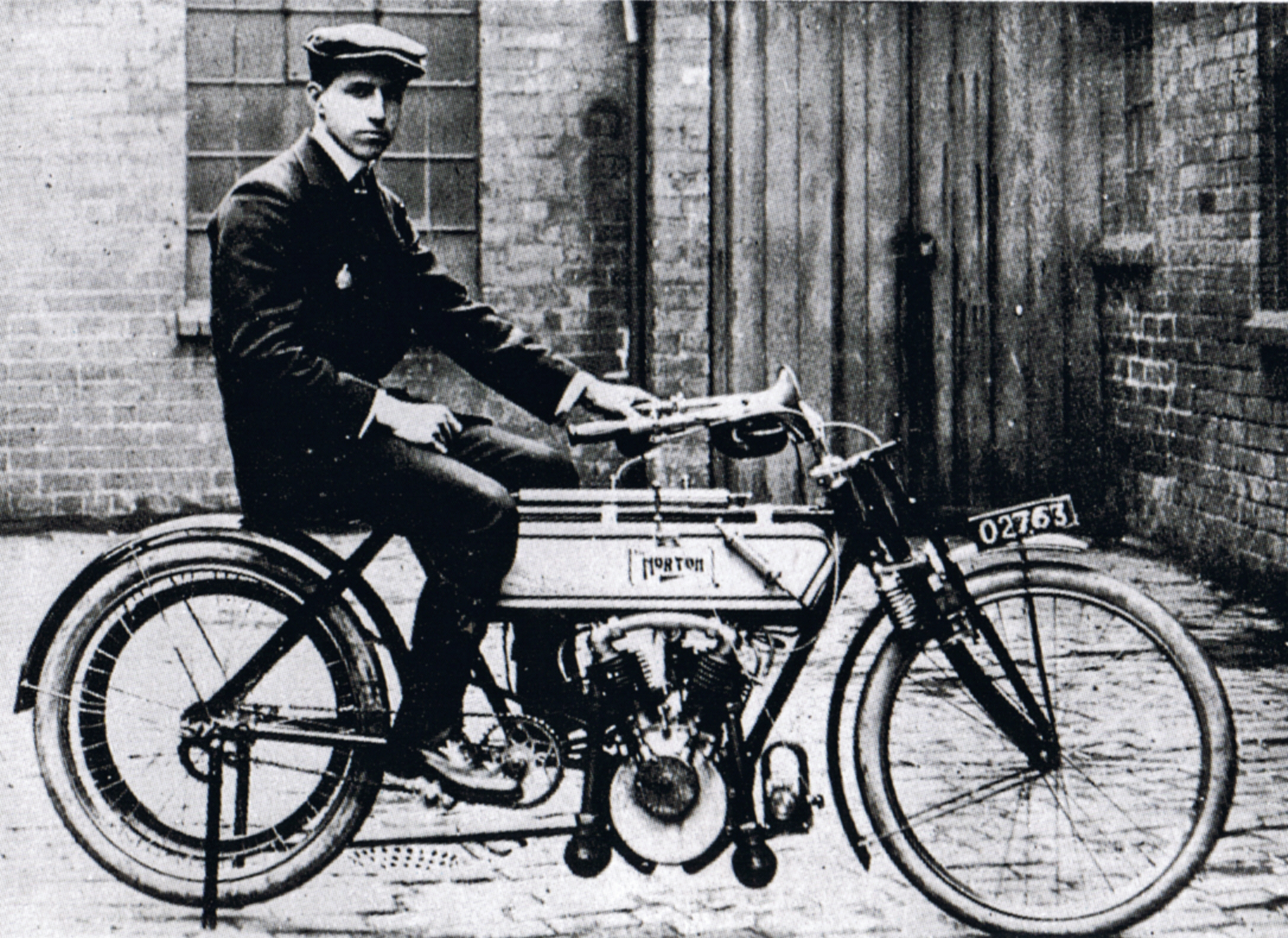
Rem Fowler on his Peugeot-engined Norton, winner of the 1907 TT twin-cylinder race

A Peugeot-engined Norton motorcycle ridden by Rem Fowler won the twin-cylinder class of the inaugural 1907 Isle of Man TT races.

Peugeot returned to top-level motorcycle racing in 2016 via a Moto3 project in collaboration with parent company Mahindra. In 2016 Peugeot MC Saxoprint fielded two Mahindra-based Peugeot MGP3Os for John McPhee and Alexis Masbou. Albert Arenas joined the team for the 2nd half of the season as a replacement for Masbou. McPhee took his, and Peugeot's, first Grand Prix win in wet conditions at Brno. In Australia, McPhee crashed while running in third place and was run over by Andrea Migno who was running right behind him. The race was red flagged and McPhee was taken to hospital where he was diagnosed with concussion, a broken thumb and a punctured lung. The injuries meant McPhee missed the final 2 races of the season. Hafiq Azmi replaced him in Malaysia, whilst Vicente Pérez replaced him in Valencia.

In 2017 Patrik Pulkkinen and Jakub Kornfeil rode for the team. At the end of the 2017 season both Peugeot and Mahindra withdrew from motorcycle grand prix. The decision to withdraw was made so that the Mahindra Group could increase its focus on the FIA Formula E Championship.

=== Grand Prix motorcycle results ===
Season	Class	Team	Machine	Rider	1	2	3	4	5	6	7	8	9	10	11	12	13	14	15	16	17	18	R.C.	Points	M.C.	Points
2016	Moto3	Peugeot MC Saxoprint	Peugeot MGP3O	(United Kingdom) John McPhee	QAT; 27	ARG; 7	AME; 21	ESP; Ret	FRA; 20	ITA; 23	CAT; 15	NED; 16	GER; 6	AUT; 24	CZE; 1	GBR; 17	RSM; 20	ARA; 13	JPN; Ret	AUS; Ret	MAL	VAL	22nd	48	4th	55
2016	Moto3	Peugeot MC Saxoprint	Peugeot MGP3O	(Malaysia) Hafiq Azmi	QAT	ARG	AME	ESP	FRA	ITA	CAT	NED	GER	AUT	CZE	GBR	RSM	ARA	JPN	AUS	MAL; 11	VAL	33rd	5	4th	55
2016	Moto3	Peugeot MC Saxoprint	Peugeot MGP3O	(Spain) Vicente Pérez	QAT	ARG	AME	ESP	FRA	ITA	CAT	NED	GER	AUT	CZE	GBR	RSM	ARA	JPN	AUS	MAL	VAL; 23	NC	0	4th	55
2016	Moto3	Peugeot MC Saxoprint	Peugeot MGP3O	(France) Alexis Masbou	QAT; 24	ARG; 21	AME; 16	ESP; Ret	FRA; 19	ITA; Ret	CAT; Ret	NED; Ret	GER; 16	AUT	CZE	GBR	RSM	ARA	JPN	AUS	MAL	VAL	NC	0	4th	55
2016	Moto3	Peugeot MC Saxoprint	Peugeot MGP3O	(Spain) Albert Arenas	QAT	ARG	AME	ESP	FRA	ITA	CAT	NED	GER	AUT; 22	CZE; Ret	GBR; Ret	RSM; 19	ARA; 24	JPN; 14	AUS; 16	MAL; Ret	VAL; 24	35th	2	4th	55
2017	Moto3	Peugeot MC Saxoprint	Peugeot MGP3O	(Czech Republic) Jakub Kornfeil	QAT; 20	ARG; 18	AME; 23	ESP; 18	FRA; 11	ITA; 20	CAT; 22	NED; 17	GER; 18	CZE; 20	AUT; 20	GBR; 23	RSM; 7	ARA; 25	JPN; 8	AUS; 12	MAL; 21	VAL; 18	22nd	26	4th	26
2017	Moto3	Peugeot MC Saxoprint	Peugeot MGP3O	(Finland) Patrik Pulkkinen	QAT; Ret	ARG; 26	AME; 27	ESP; 26	FRA; 23	ITA; 27	CAT; 27	NED; 22	GER; 25	CZE; 30	AUT; 24	GBR; 24	RSM; Ret	ARA; 29	JPN; 22	AUS; Ret	MAL; 23	VAL; 29	NC	0	4th	26
