= Peugeot SC =

Peugeot SC/SX
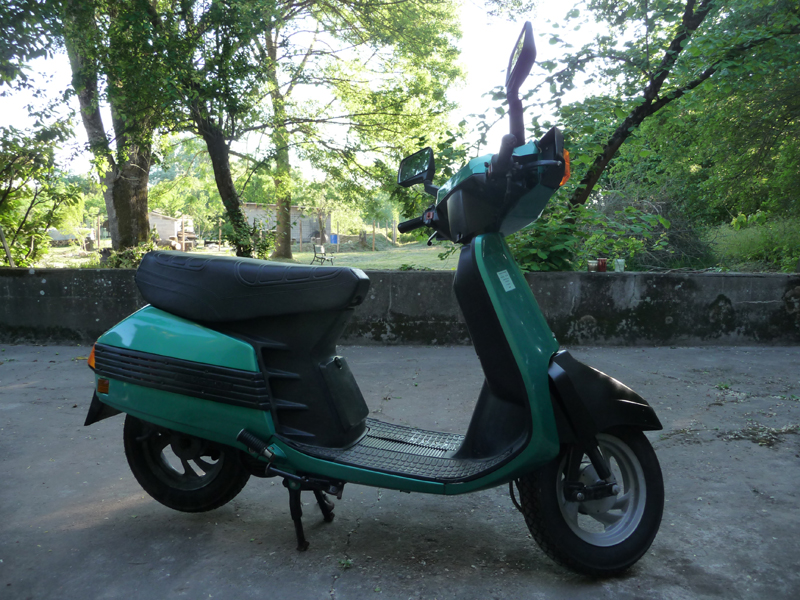
- Peugeot SC 80
- Manufacturer: Peugeot Motocycles
- Also called: Peugeot SX
- Production: 1983-1992
- Assembly: Mandeure, France
- Successor: Peugeot SV
- Class: Scooter
- Engine: 49.4 cc (3.01 cu in); 79.6 cc (4.86 cu in)
- Bore / stroke: 39.9 mm × 39.8 mm (1.57 in × 1.57 in) (50); 48 mm × 44 mm (1.9 in × 1.7 in) (80)
- Transmission: CVT automatic
- Suspension: Swinging fork
- Brakes: Drum 110 mm (front & rear)
- Dimensions: L: 1,710 mm (67.3 in); W: 650 mm (25.6 in); H: 1,060 mm (41.7 in)
- Seat height: 730 mm (28.7 in)
- Weight: 73-79 kg (wet)
- Fuel capacity: 5.3 L (1.2 imp gal; 1.4 US gal)
- Related: Peugeot ST/Rapido; Honda Lead

The Peugeot SC is a scooter made by the French company Peugeot Motocycles from 1983 to 1992.

== History ==
At the end of the seventies, Peugeot MTC started the development of a new compact and light scooter made with a plastic body. This project served to strengthen the presence in the "two-wheeler" segment with a more modern and comfortable product than the classic 50 scooters that dominated the market and at the same time compete with the new Japanese products that were invading the European market.

In June 1981 an agreement was signed with the Japanese Honda which provided for the purchase of Japanese four-stroke engines, variator transmission and electrical components to be installed on the future Peugeot scooter.

In 1983 the new Peugeot SC was officially presented, the first scooter of the French company equipped with 50 and 80 cm^{3} two-stroke Honda engines and automatic gearbox; this mechanism derives from the Honda Lead, produced in Japan from the previous year.

Very rich in equipment, it had 10" wheels, hydraulic suspension, electronic ignition, 110 mm drum braking system both front and rear, a wide handlebar with a protective shield that extended up to the knobs in order to protect the hands from the wind, single or two-seater saddle. It was available in two versions: the basic “L” and the richer “LM”.

It immediately achieved immediate success at home despite the high price and the following year it also began to be exported to other countries such as Spain and Germany. In Italy it will be imported from 1984 called SC Metropolis with prices from 1,800,000 to 2,100,000 lire.

In 1988 the 80 cc version changed its name to Peugeot SX; this was because the fiftieth had achieved great success especially among young people, while the 80 version was preferred by an adult public (as it could be driven in France with a normal car licence).

The production of the SC 50 and the SX 80 ended in 1992.
