= Rapido =

Rapido may refer to:

== Transportation ==
- Rapido (train), former brand name for passenger rail services in Ontario and Quebec, Canada
- Arnold Rapido, a brand of model railway equipment manufactured by Arnold (models)
- Rapido Trains, a model railway manufacturer in Canada
- Peugeot Rapido, a scooter built by Peugeot
- Optare Rapido, a discontinued coach manufactured by Optare
- Spanish cruiser Rapido, an 1889 auxiliary cruiser that served in the Spanish–American War
- Rapido (company), an Indian ride hailing company

== Other uses ==
- Rapido (comics), a Marvel Comics character
- Rapido (river), a river in Italy
- Rapido (TV series), a music TV programme presented by Antoine de Caunes
- Ratz (TV series), originally titled Rapido, a joint French and Canadian animated series, also the name of one of the two main characters
- Rápido de Bouzas, a Spanish football team
- Rapido Trimarans, a brand of multihull ship
- A South Korean fashion and sportswear brand by Samsung C&T Corporation
