= Peugeot Kisbee =

Scooter model produced by Peugeot Motocycles

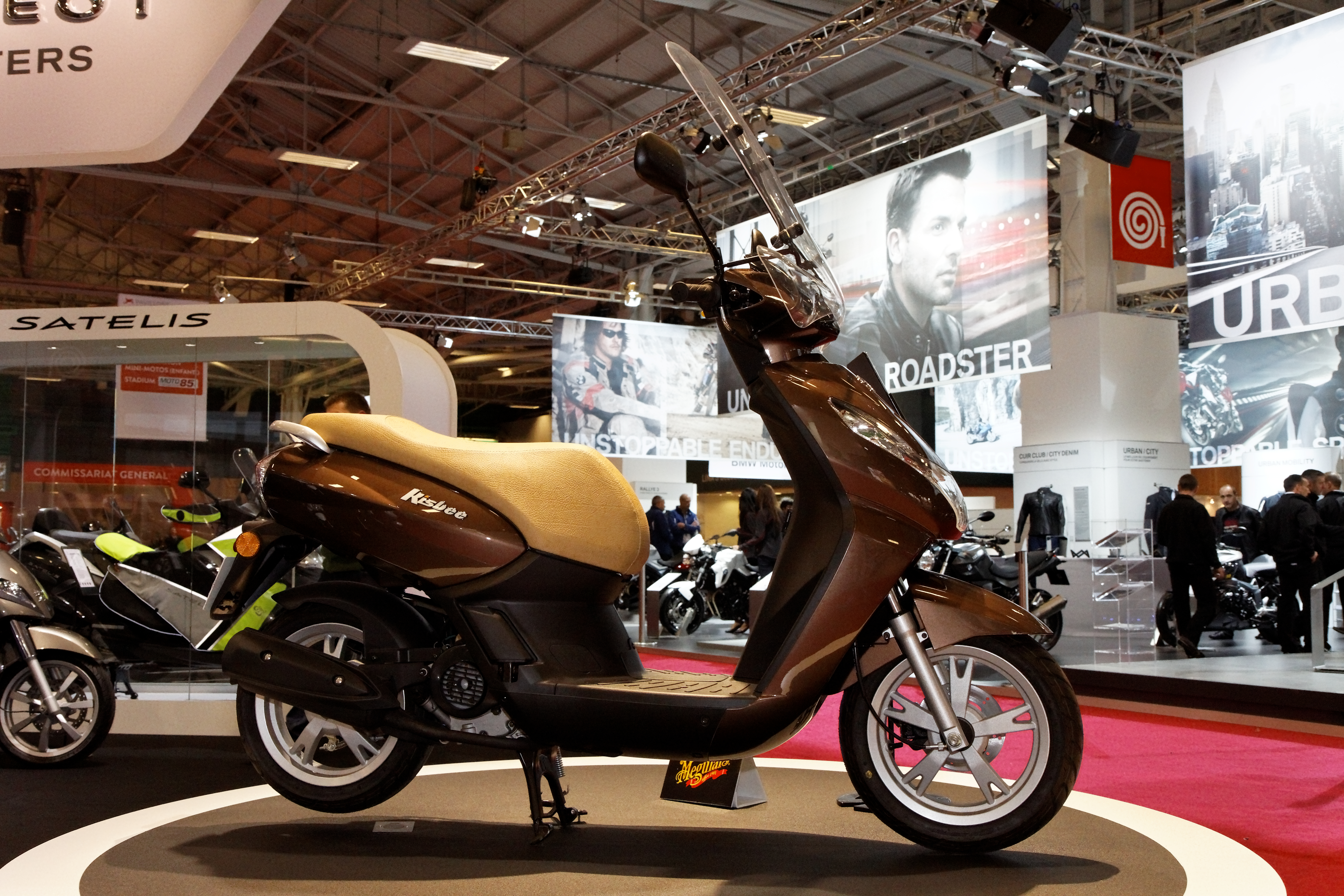
- Manufacturer: Peugeot Motocycles
- Production: 2010 - present
- Predecessor: Peugeot Vivacity; Peugeot V-clic
- Class: Scooter
- Engine: Forced-Air cooled Single cylinder OHV 2- or 4-stroke
- Transmission: CVT
- Suspension: Front hydraulic fork, rear shock absorber
- Brakes: 170mm front brake disc, 110mm rear drum brakes
- Fuel capacity: 6,5l

The Peugeot Kisbee is a scooter model produced by Peugeot Motocycles. Alternatively, it is available as an RS model, which is technically the same, only optically upgraded and painted in different colors.
