= Peugeot Tweet =

Type of scooter

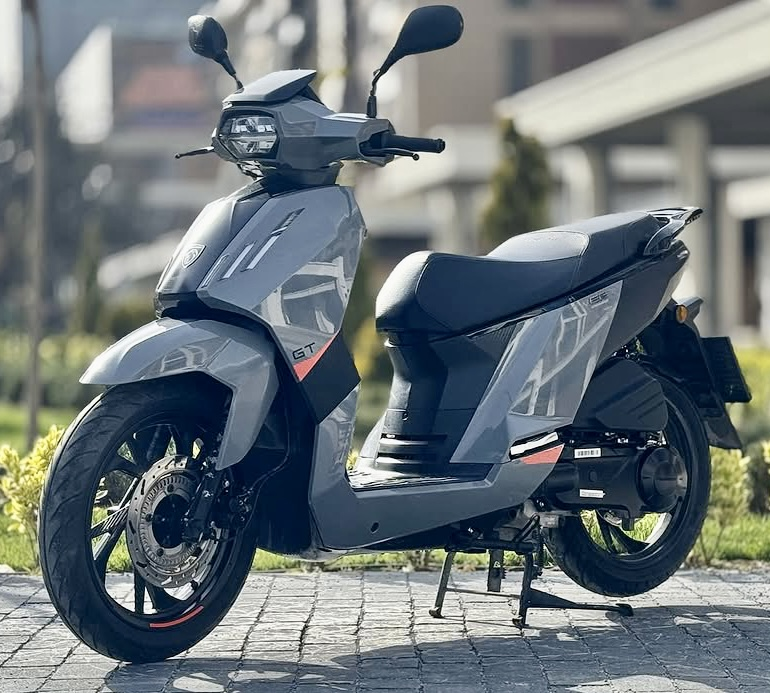
- 2024 Peugeot Tweet GT 125
- Manufacturer: Peugeot Motocycles
- Production: 2010–present
- Assembly: Xiamen, China
- Predecessor: Peugeot Looxor
- Class: Scooter
- Related: SYM Symphony

The Peugeot Tweet is a high-wheeled scooter manufactured by Peugeot Motocycles in collaboration with SYM. Introduced in 2010 as the successor to the Peugeot Looxor, it is derived from the SYM Symphony and is produced at the Xiamen Shaxing Motorcycle Co., Ltd. plant, a Chinese subsidiary of the SYM Group.

== First Generation (2010–2023) ==
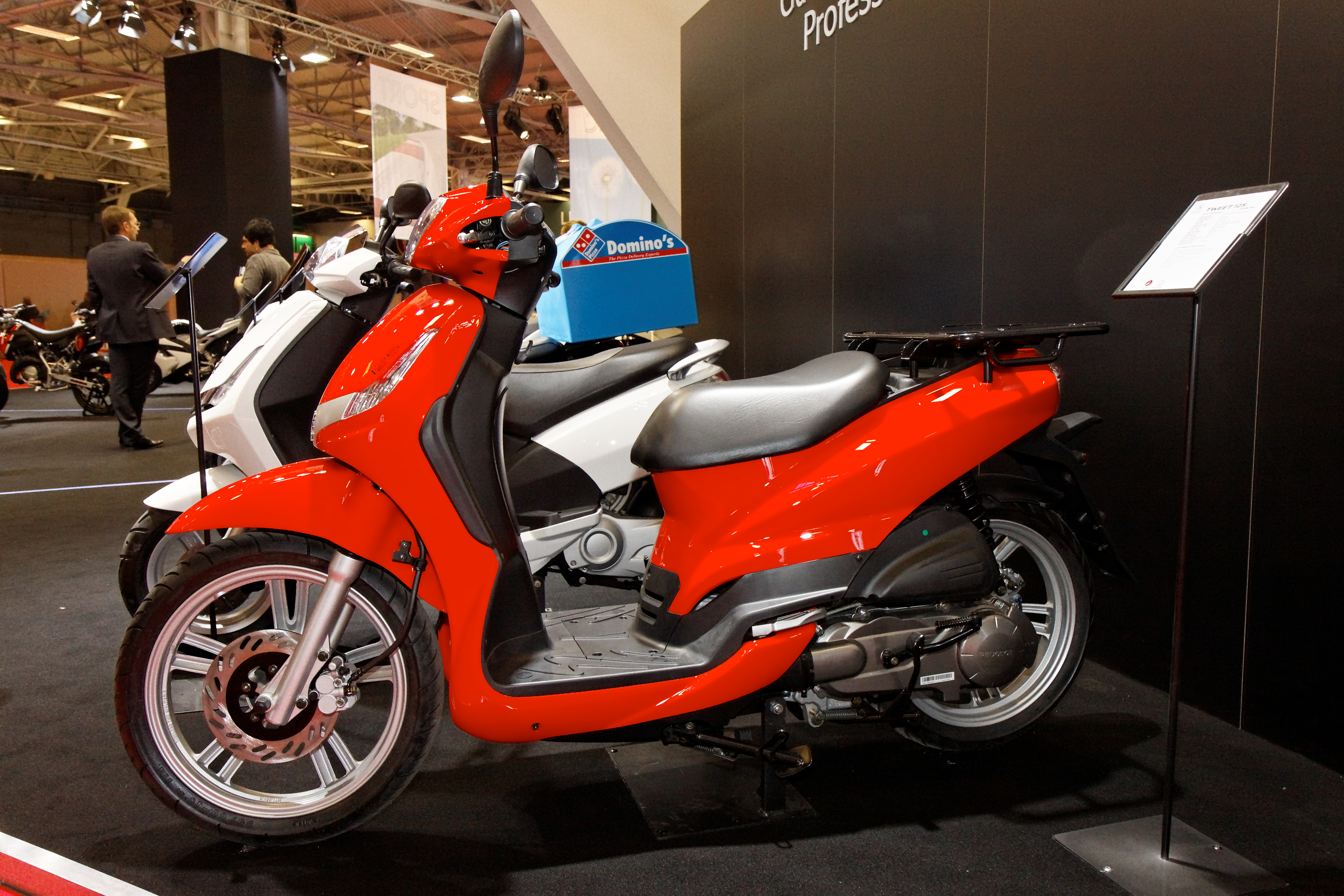
2011 Peugeot Tweet 125

The Peugeot Tweet was unveiled at the EICMA motorcycle show in Milan in November 2009 and reached European dealerships in 2010. It is a 16-inch high-wheel scooter with a flat floorboard, available in three SYM-derived engine sizes: 50, 125, and 150 cm^{3}, all single-cylinder, four-stroke, air-cooled units.

From a technical standpoint, it features a telescopic front fork, a single rear shock absorber for the 50 cm^{3} model, and dual shock absorbers for the 125 and 150 cm^{3} versions. Braking is handled by a 226 mm front disc and either a rear disc (on the 125/150) or a drum brake (on the 50).

In 2012, Peugeot introduced the Tweet Pro, a cargo version equipped with a single-seat saddle and a rear rack capable of supporting up to 30 kg.

=== 2013 Facelift ===
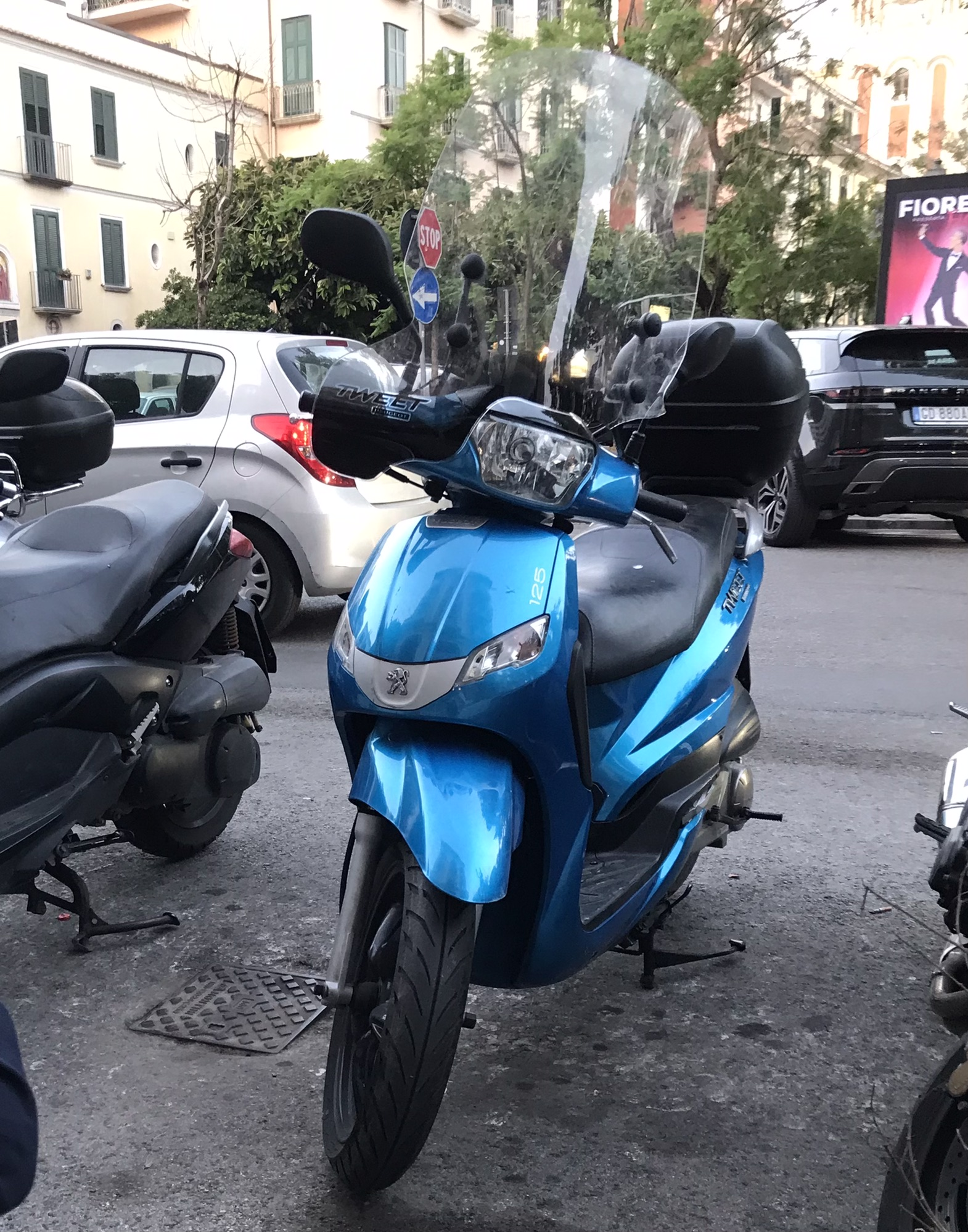
Peugeot Tweet facelift 2013

At EICMA 2013, Peugeot presented the first aesthetic update of the Tweet, renamed Tweet Evo. The changes included a new front fairing and mudguard, an updated Peugeot logo, a redesigned dashboard, a new fork, a saddle with more comfortable foam, and new color options.

Following the 2014 Motorbike Expo in Verona, the Tweet RS trim was introduced, distinguished by matte body colors with contrasting details, black wheels, and a specific RS logo.

At EICMA 2015, Peugeot unveiled the 2016 range, introducing special editions named Double Black and Paris. Also in May 2016 the limited edition Allure was also introduced.

In November 2017, at EICMA, the MY 2018 range was presented, featuring engines updated to comply with Euro 4 regulations.

The last update occurred in 2019 with the introduction of SYM-sourced engines for the 50 and 125 cm^{3} models, now Euro 5 compliant, and a new 200 cm^{3} engine (actual displacement of 170 cm^{3}) replacing the previous 150 cm^{3} unit.

== Second Generation (from 2023) ==
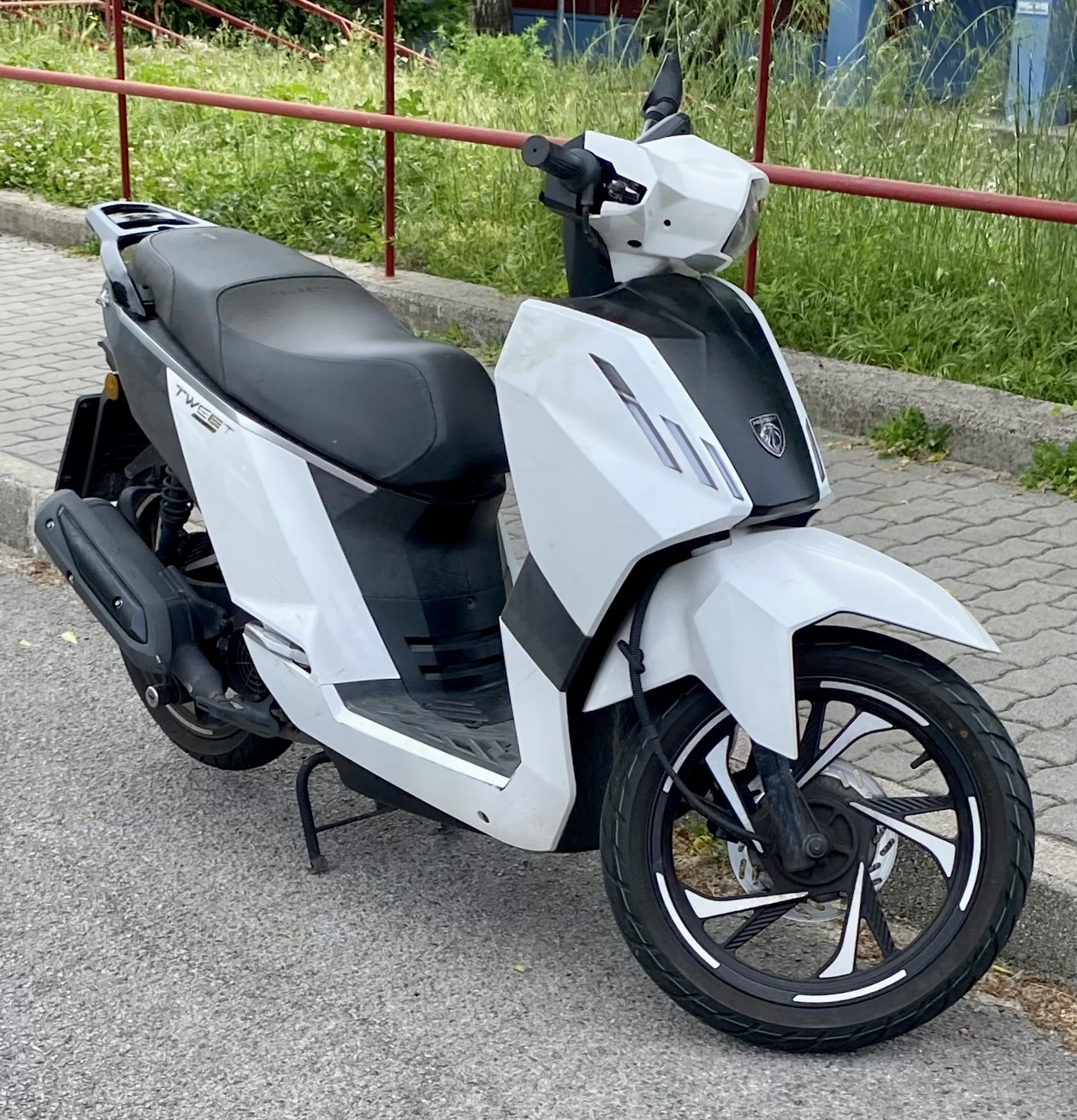
Tweet 125 second generation

In November 2022, at the EICMA show, Peugeot Motocycles unveiled the second generation of the Tweet scooter. Still based on the SYM Symphony and manufactured by SYM, this version features a new, more angular design developed by Peugeot's design center, drawing inspiration from the brand's automotive production. Key design elements include: a new hexagonal LED front headlight mounted on the handlebar, new LED daytime running lights with three vertical stripes on the front shield, inspired by the lion's claws, similar to those found on Peugeot 208 and 2008 cars. Also a rear light with a new signature design, a new Peugeot logo positioned on the front shield. Sales commenced in 2023.

The new Tweet range includes the following engine options:

- 50 cm^{3}: Single-cylinder, 4-stroke, air-cooled engine producing 2.2 kW (3 HP) at 8,000 rpm and a torque of 3 Nm at 6,000 rpm.
- 125 cm^{3}: Single-cylinder, 4-stroke, air-cooled engine delivering 8.4 kW (11.5 HP) at 8,500 rpm and a torque of 10.3 Nm at 6,500 rpm.
- 200 cm^{3}: Single-cylinder, 4-stroke, air-cooled engine with an actual displacement of 170 cm^{3}, generating 9 kW (12.2 HP) at 7,500 rpm and a torque of 10.2 Nm at 6,000 rpm.

There are two main trims available:

- Allure: Featuring diamond-cut wheels.
- GT: Equipped with black wheels and orange accents along the bodywork.

Additionally, a Cargo version is available, which includes a single-seat saddle and a rear luggage rack.

The 125 model is equipped with ABS, while the 200 model features a combined braking system (CBS).

== Peugeot Kisbee M 125 (from 2025) ==
In April 2025, the first-generation Peugeot Tweet underwent an aesthetic update and was rebranded as the Peugeot Kisbee M 125. This renaming to Kisbee M serves to distinguish it from the entirely new second generation of the Peugeot Tweet. The Kisbee M features the “Kisbee” logo on the front shield and is positioned at a lower price point than the Tweet, offering a more economical alternative.
