= Peugeot Satelis Compressor =

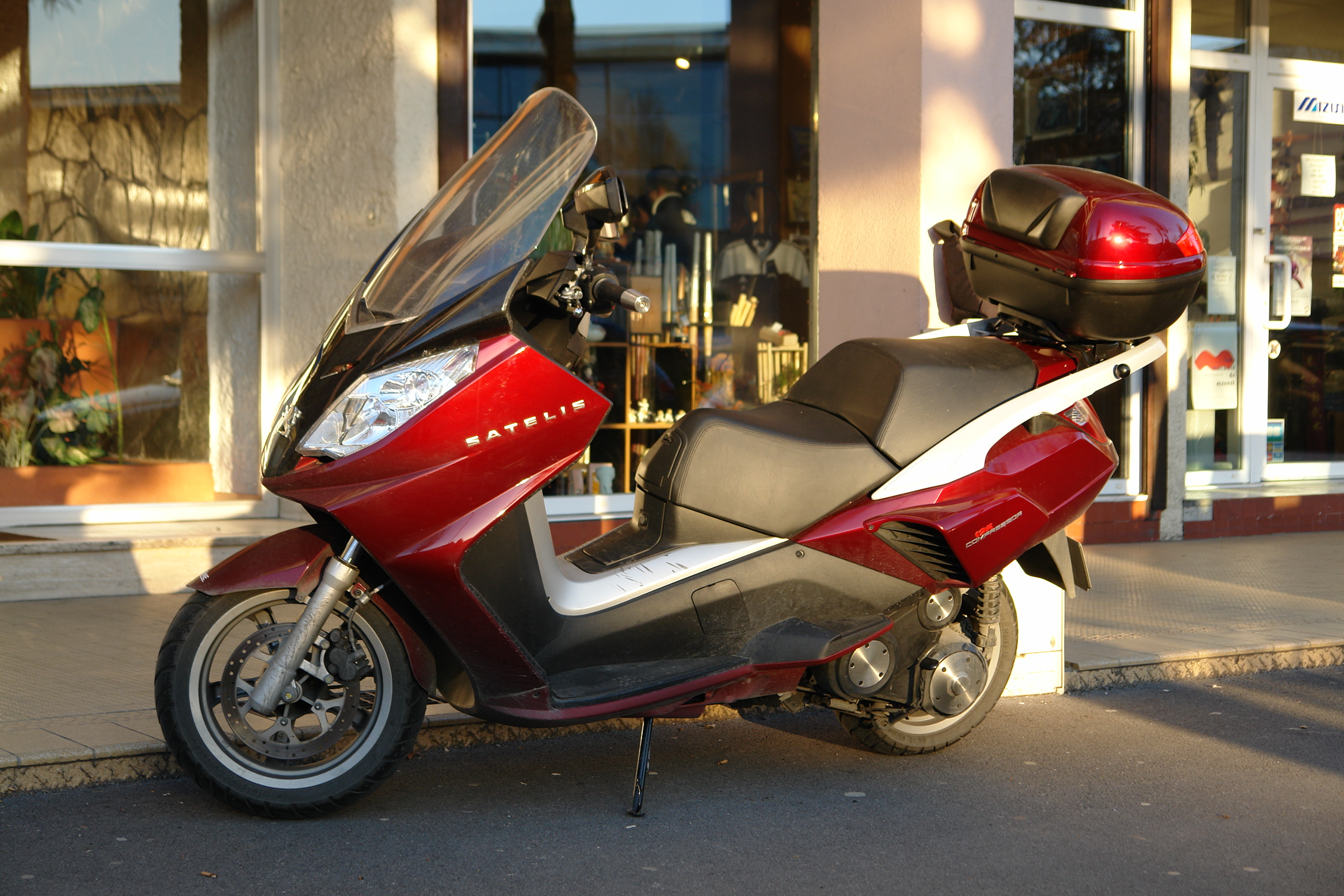
- Peugeot Satelis 125 Compressor
- Manufacturer: Peugeot Motocycles
- Parent company: Peugeot
- Production: 2006-2012
- Predecessor: Jet Force Compressor
- Engine: 125 cc, single cylinder, 4 stroke
- Bore / stroke: 57 x 48.9 mm
- Brakes: Front: 1 disc ø 260 mm, dual-piston caliper / Rear: 1 disc ø 210 mm, dual-piston caliper
- Tires: Front: 120/70 x 14 - Rear: 140/60 x 13
- Dimensions: L: 2152 mm
- Seat height: 784 mm
- Fuel capacity: 13.5 l

The Peugeot Satelis Compressor is a scooter made by the French company Peugeot from 2006 to 2012. In 2005, Peugeot created the Jet Force Compressor, the first scooter with a compressor (supercharger). This scooter was produced in two models, K15 for 15 hp, and K20 for 20 hp. This is due to the French law which allows people owning a B driving license (for cars) to drive motorbikes and scooters up to 125 cc and 15 hp. So the first model can be driven by an ordinary B car license, while the second needs a specific A motorbike license. Each model was available in 3 options: Premium, City (with padlock), and Executive (with padlock + ABS).

== See also ==
- Peugeot Motocycles
