= Peugeot 500 M =

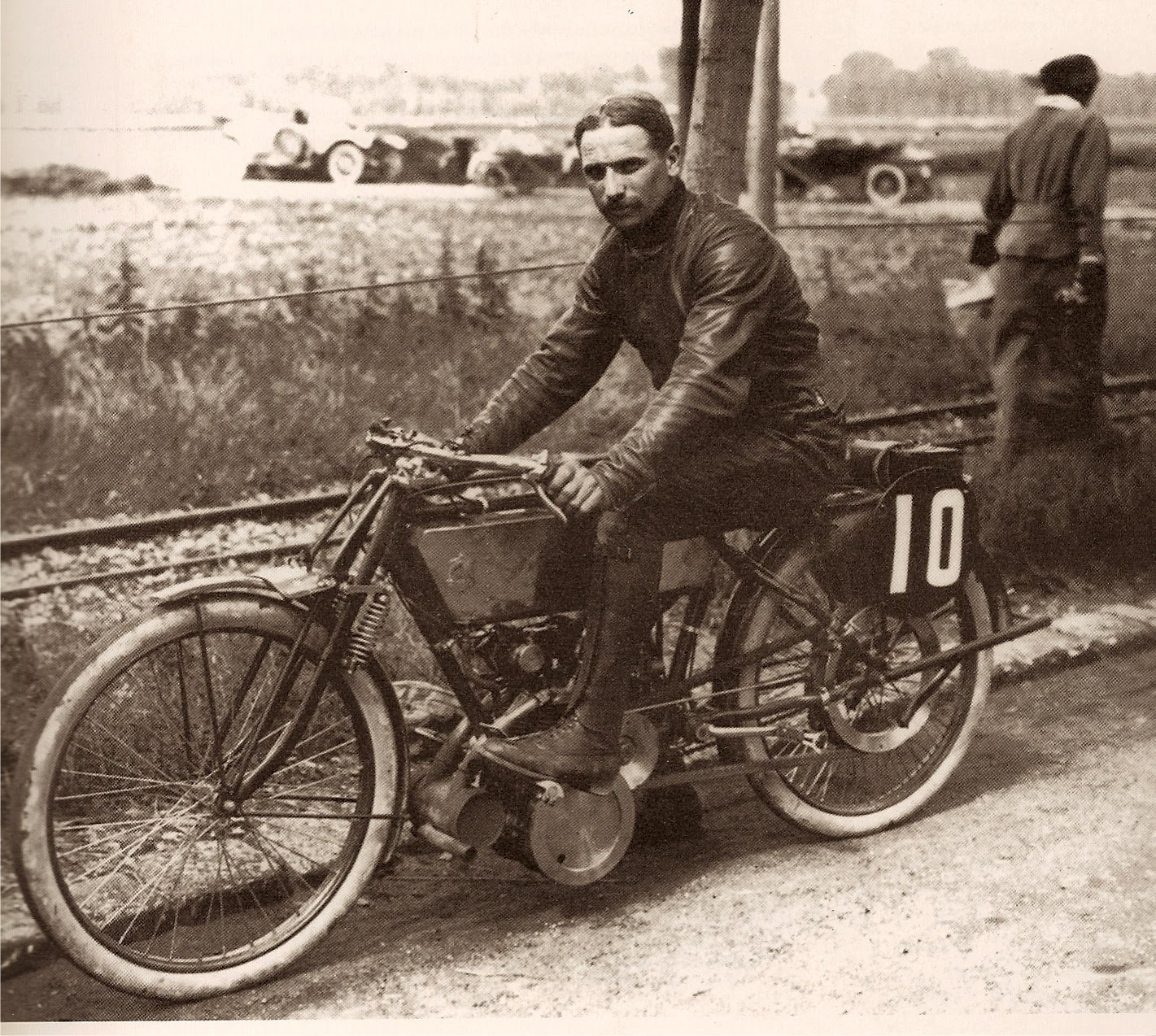
- Peugeot race team rider Paul Péan on a 500 M
- Manufacturer: Peugeot
- Production: 1913–1914
- Engine: 495 cc Parallel twin, 4-valve per cylinder gear-driven dual overhead cam
- Bore / stroke: 62 × 82 mm
- Top speed: c. 122 km/h (76 mph)
- Power: 15 hp (11 kW)
- Transmission: Primary: chain Final: Belt (probably leather)
- Suspension: Front: girder fork Rear: rigid
- Brakes: Pedal-operated drum

The Peugeot 500 M (1913–1914) was a French racing motorcycle designed by Ernest Henry in 1913. It was a "technical tour de force" as the first motorcycle ever designed with a dual overhead camshaft. It also used a multi-valve cylinder head, with four valves per cylinder.

== Development and technology ==
The Swiss engineer Ernest Henry adapted his incredibly successful Peugeot four-cylinder automobile racing engine (1912) for a racing motorcycle. The 500M used a parallel twin-cylinder engine, with dual overhead camshafts driven by a cascade of gears between the cylinders, with four-valve cylinder heads. The 500M was the most technically advanced motorcycle in the world when introduced. However, the design was ahead of the metallurgy available at the time, and suffered from cracking between the valve seats.

While the engine was incredibly advanced, power transmission was a single speed via direct belt drive. At the rear wheel the Peugeot had a pedal-operated drum brake. Front suspension was a girder fork.

== Test drives ==
Peugeot proved the reliability of the motor bike in test runs conducted in 1913. The racing motorcycle reached a world record of 122.2 km/h (75.9 mph) over the flying kilometre for its displacement class. The company entered reliable and proven two-cylinder V-engines with simple valve actuation in the 1913 French motorcycle Grand Prix. The machine was raced at various venues, but its full potential was thwarted due to the First World War.

== Later redesigns ==
Peugeot resumed development in 1919 of Henry's original 1913/4 design. Major redesigns were executed by Marcel Grémillon in 1919 who moved the DOHC gear drive to the side of the engine, and a 3-speed gearbox with clutch. Lessman Antonesco altered the design again in 1923, changing the design to a simpler OHC, 2-valve motor with the camshaft driven by shaft-and-bevel. This proved the fastest and most reliable variant of all, but by 1925, Peugeot separated its motorcycling and automotive divisions, and the GP twin project was abandoned.

== 2010 reproduction ==
For the 100th anniversary of the model, an electronics engineer named Jean Boulicot built a reproduction between c. 2000 and 2010 from Henry's original blueprints, using a home lathe and milling machine.

The reproduction machine was displayed at Salon Rétromobile 2010.

== See also ==
- List of motorcycles of the 1910s
