= Peugeot Metropolis 400 =

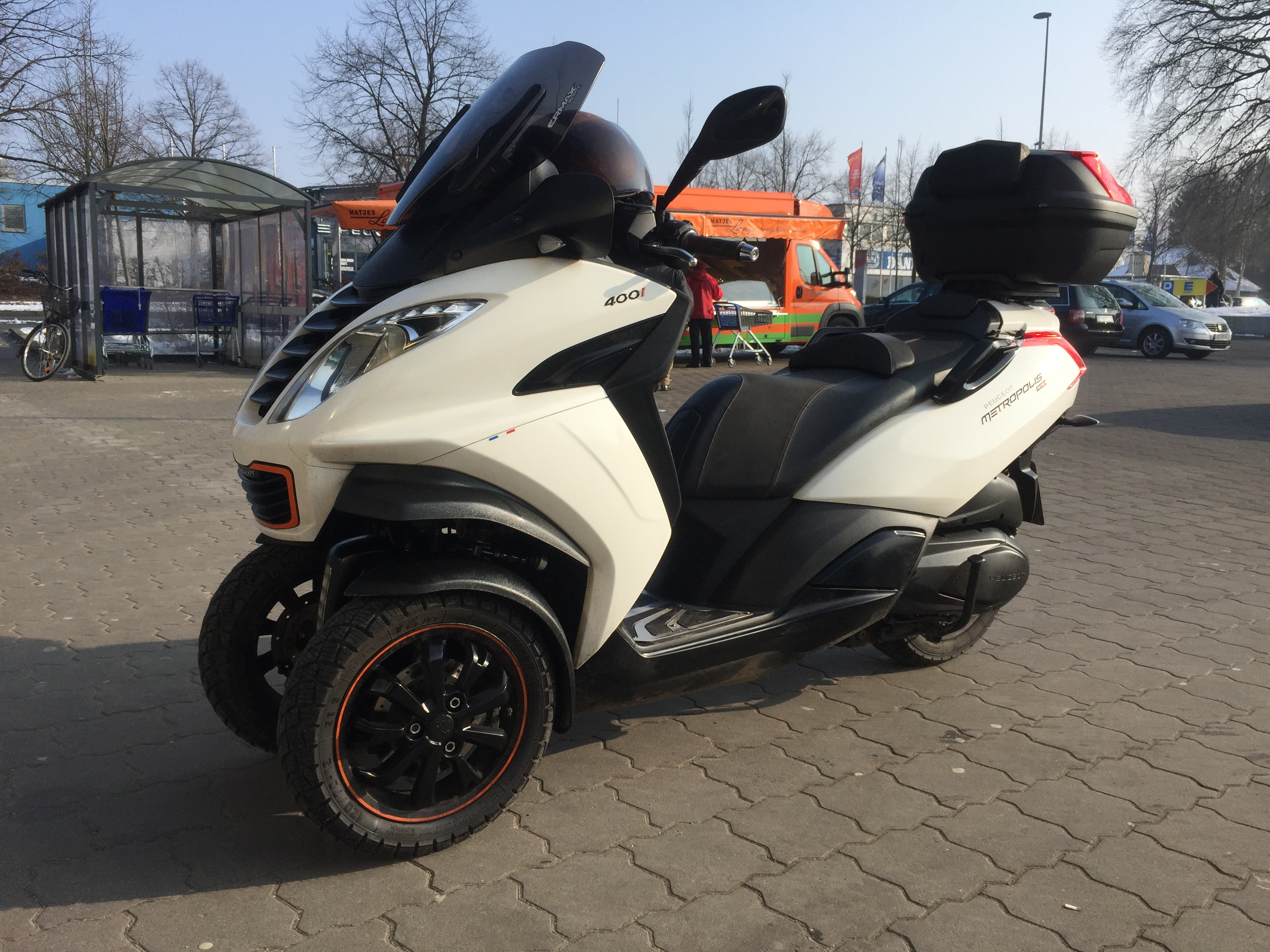
- Manufacturer: Peugeot Motocycles
- Production: 2013 - present
- Class: Three-wheeled scooter

The Peugeot Metropolis 400 is a tilting three-wheeled scooter produced by Peugeot Motocycles.

== Overview ==
The Metropolis 400 has - similar to the Piaggio MP3 - a separate suspension of the two front wheels with two wishbones. They are supported on a common, hydraulic strut - while the MP3 has a separate strut for each side. The parallelogram suspension allows both front wheels to be guided in parallel.

In the summer, Peugeot Motorcycles and Dainese introduced the D-air system as an option "for all model variants of the Peugeot Metropolis".

People whose license was issued before 19 January 2013, can drive the Metropolis 400 with a class B driving license, others with a class A2.
