= Peugeot Ludix =

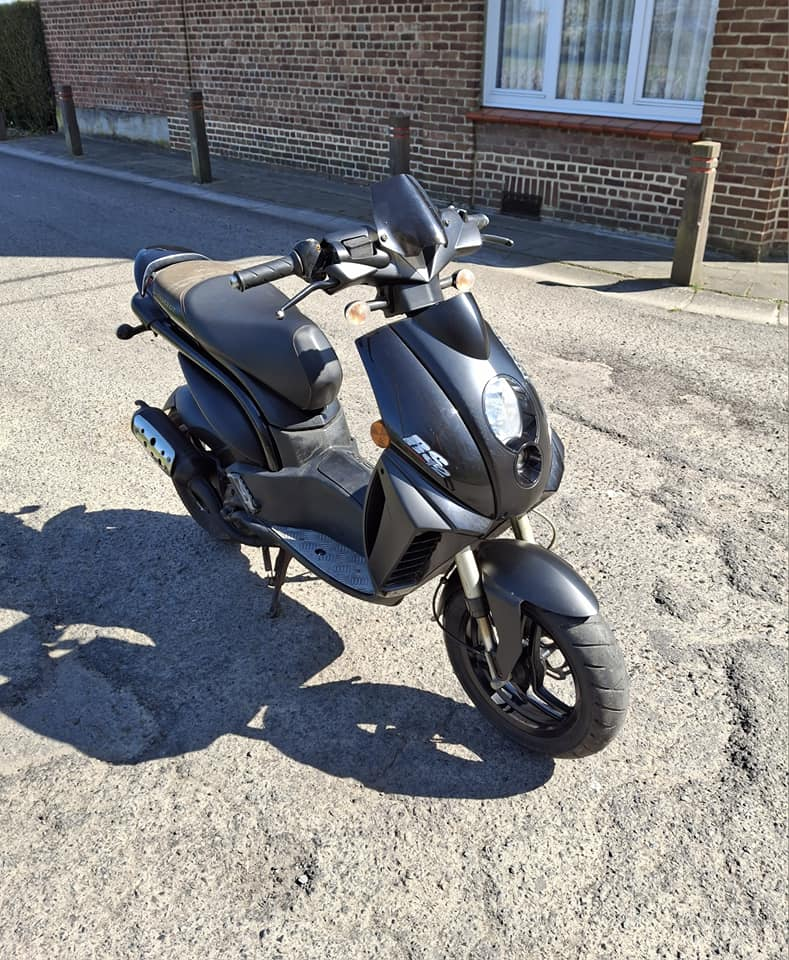
- Peugeot Ludix Blaster RS12
- Manufacturer: Peugeot Motocycles
- Production: 2004-2017 (Ludix); 2019-2024 (e-Ludix)
- Assembly: Mandeure, France (Ludix); Madhya Pradesh, India (e-Ludix)
- Class: Scooter
- Engine: 50 cc (3.1 cu in)
- Bore / stroke: 39.9 mm × 39.8 mm (1.57 in × 1.57 in)

The Peugeot Ludix is a 50 cc (3.1 cu in) scooter made by Peugeot Motocycles which comes in various models including "One", "Snake" and the "Blaster RS12".

The scooter comes in both air-cooled and water-cooled forms. The 'One' model is a single seat vehicle whereas other variants allowed for the carrying of pillion passengers. The One was also a very basic model that used drum brakes front and rear as opposed to a hydraulic front disc on more expensive models. Similarly, the One was a kick start only model whereas others were available with electric start. Also the One model runs on a generator instead of a 12 volt battery like other models and many other Peugeot scooters, this causes the indicators to be very dim, the horn to be poor sounding and quiet and there to be no lights on the small dash other than a two-stroke warning light. The models were designed to target the budget end of the market and used a modular panel system that allowed for cheap customising options through the use of easily interchangeable panels. Ludix 50cc scooters are used to stunt often.

== Peugeot e-Ludix (2019-2024) ==
Presented at EICMA 2018, the e-Ludix is the fully electric version of the small scooter which goes into production in 2019. Unlike the previous thermal model produced in France, the new series is produced in India by Mahindra & Mahindra in the factory of Madhya Pradesh, (owner of Peugeot Motocycles at the time) to reduce costs.

The e-Ludix is approved in Europe with L1e homologation (equivalent to a fifty), has a weight of 85 kg of which 9 kg of battery, mounts a Bosch 2.5 kW central electric motor and has a Bosch 48V lithium-ion battery with a capacity of 1 ,6 kWh which guarantees about 50 km of autonomy. Recharging to 80% takes place in three hours from a normal wall socket, while it takes four hours for full charging.

It comes standard with a 4.4-inch LCD screen for instrumentation. It has four driving modes: "Boost" which exploits the full power of the engine, "Go" which increases the range, "Cruise" which best combines performance and range, and "Crawl" mode, which includes reverse and is designed for parking manoeuvres.

At the end of 2024 the e-Ludix was discontinued replaced in April 2025 by the Peugeot Kisbee SE Electrique.
