= Honda NH series =

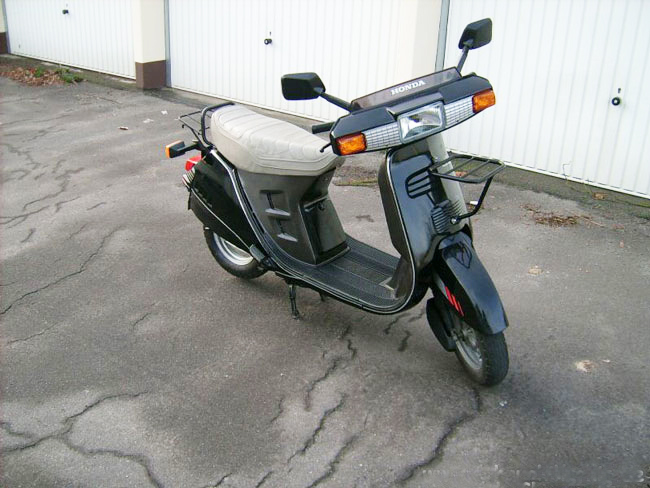
- Honda Lead 50
- Manufacturer: Honda
- Also called: Aero, Lead, Vision, Mascot, Kinetic Honda ZX, Y2K, DX
- Production: 1983–1994
- Predecessor: for Aries Hozier
- Class: Scooter
- Engine: air-cooled, two-stroke
- Ignition type: electric start
- Brakes: Front drum / Rear drum

The NH series of Honda scooters was sold worldwide beginning in 1983, in 50, 80, 90, 100 and 125cc versions. All models have an air-cooled two-stroke engine with CDI ignition. All models except the Lead 50 have leading link front suspension, electric and kick start, and a fuel gauge. The Lead 50 has a traditional telescopic fork front suspension and only electric start. All models have drum brakes and CVT transmission.

== Models ==
- Aero (USA, 1983–85)
- Lead (Outside USA, 1983–87)
- Vision (Outside USA, 1987–94)
- Mascot (Canada)

American regulations in 1986 required any motorcycle over 50cc to be four stroke to combat air pollution.

- Kinetic (DX, ZX, Y2K Etc..) (India, 1984–2007)
- Dio (India, 2001–present)

== Engine sizes ==
- NH 50 (49cc)
- NH 80 (79cc)
- NH 90 (89cc)
- NH 100 (96cc)
- NH 125 (124cc)
- NH 150 (149cc)

There is also a more modern Lead in 100cc, 110cc and 125cc versions.

== Regional variations ==
There were other regional variations as well as going by a different name in the USA. Most notably, the headlights were different on the early European models. The front handlebar moulding was later changed to be common across all models, allowing the same headlights to be used. Although the specific light arrangements still vary because of the regulations in different countries (indicators in different locations) Stickers, badges and mirrors are also different across regional versions.

=== Honda Dio ===
Manufactured by Honda Motorcycle and Scooter India, Honda Dio is a 110cc scooter introduced in 2001 in India and exported with the same brand name to 11 countries including Nepal, Sri Lanka, Bangladesh, Mexico and Columbia. It has a 110cc, 4 stroke, air cooled engine and has both electric start and kick start. Its tank can hold 6 litres of petrol with 1 litre in reserve. India Today magazine named Honda Dio as the 4th most selling Scooter in June 2021. Honda India introduced Dio Repsol, a sporty looking scooter introduced to celebrate 800 victories in MotoGP.

== Other manufacturers ==
During the 1980s, Honda invested in non-Japanese motorcycle manufacturing – most notably they bought a large percentage of French company Peugeot, which resulted in Peugeot Motocycles. Elsewhere, the Kinetic Motor Company from India, which resulted in Kinetic Honda. Both of these joint ventures saw the NH series given various degrees of cosmetic overhaul and released as a number of different models. Peugeot released the SC series (SC 50, SC 50L, SC 80L and SX 80L) whilst Kinetic Honda released the EX, DX, ZX (100cc, 2-stroke), the ZX Zoom (110cc, 2-stroke) and the 4S model (113.5cc, 4-stroke).
