= Peugeot JetForce =

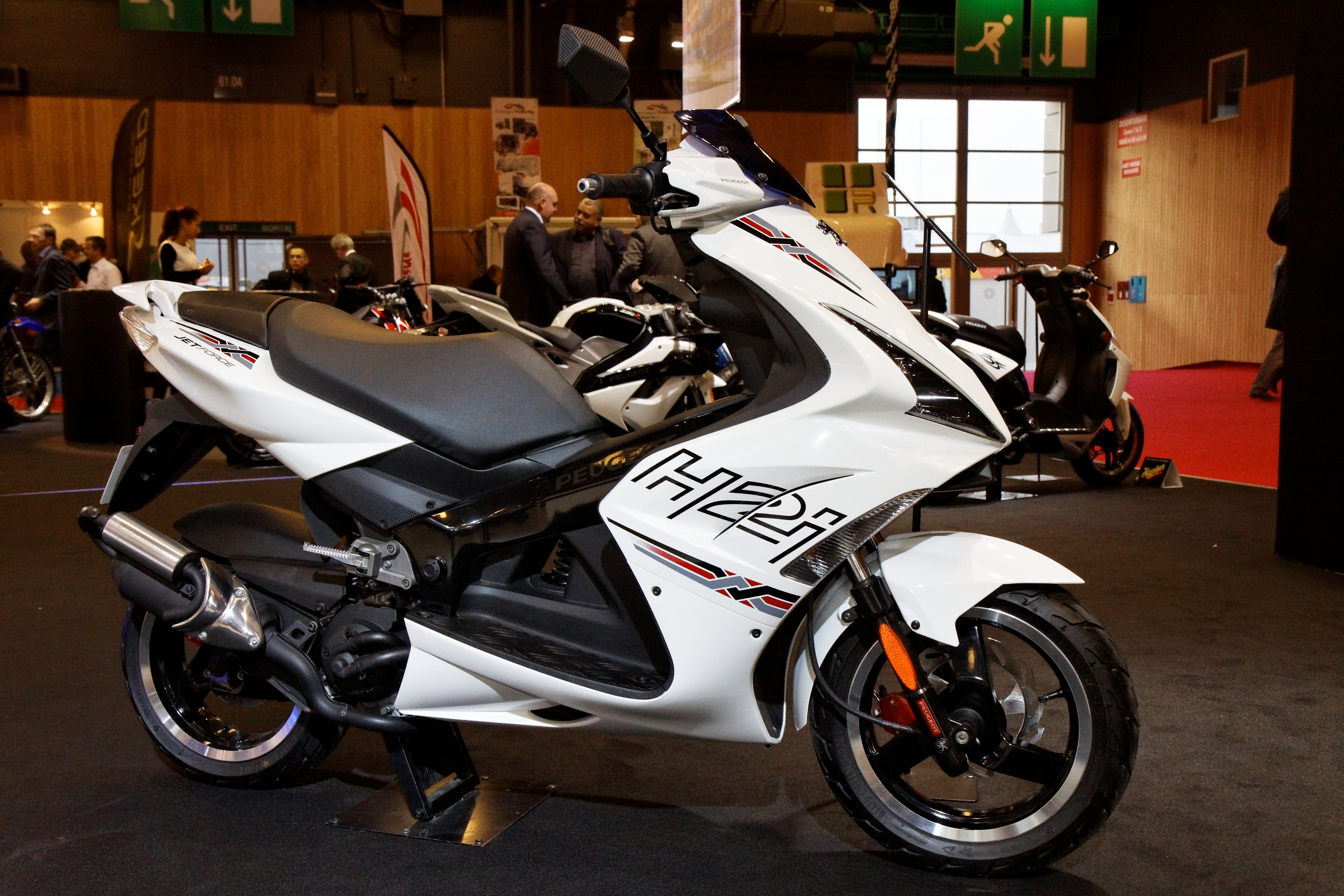
- JetForce C-TECH 50 H2i
- Manufacturer: Peugeot Motocycles
- Production: 2002–2009
- Class: Scooter; Moped

The Peugeot JetForce is a scooter manufactured by Peugeot Motocycles from 2002 until early 2009. It was available in a 125 cc (7.6 cu in) four-stroke version and a 50 cc (3.1 cu in) two-stroke along with its several sub-types.

== Overview ==
Both the 125cc and 50cc variants use an EFI system which was sourced from SynerJect - originally a joint venture between the Orbital Engine Company (Balcatta, Western Australia) and Siemens - now fully owned by Continental. The EFI is a direct descendant of the "OCP" (Orbital Combustion Process) system. Where the 125cc 4-stroke uses a conventional port injected fuel system, the 2-stroke uses the OCP fuel and compressed air injection system. A crank/eccentric mounted air pump is used to directly inject air and fuel into the cylinder.

The EFI computers are manufactured by Philips in Europe. The 125cc throttle body is manufactured by Bing in Germany. Other components such as fuel pumps are sourced by Synerject.

Brakes are disc front and rear however ABS was an option on all models.

Electrics are 12V on both models.

== 125 cc ==
This model had a 4-stroke, water-cooled, electronic fuel-injected single-cylinder engine. Supercharged models were available from the end of 2003 as the JetForce 125 Compressor.

== 50 cc ==
2-Stroke. This model sold as an "unrestricted" scooter, which could reach 75 km/h (47 mph) according to the technical specification. As well, there are two "restricted" versions still on sale in Europe: for 45 km/h (28 mph) which can be driven with a B type (personal car) driving licence and a 25 km/h (16 mph) ("moped") version, requiring no driving licence at all. Until 2004, the 50 cc (3.1 cu in) model sold with electronic fuel injection (TSDI); afterwards, the carburettor version (C-TECH) was introduced. Both versions have separate oil tank.

All engines are water-cooled and have a EURO-2 catalytic converter. The petrol tank can hold 8 L (1.8 imp gal; 2.1 US gal) of unleaded petrol. The transmission is always a continuously variable transmission.

== See also ==
- List of motorcycles by type of engine
