= Peugeot Streetzone =

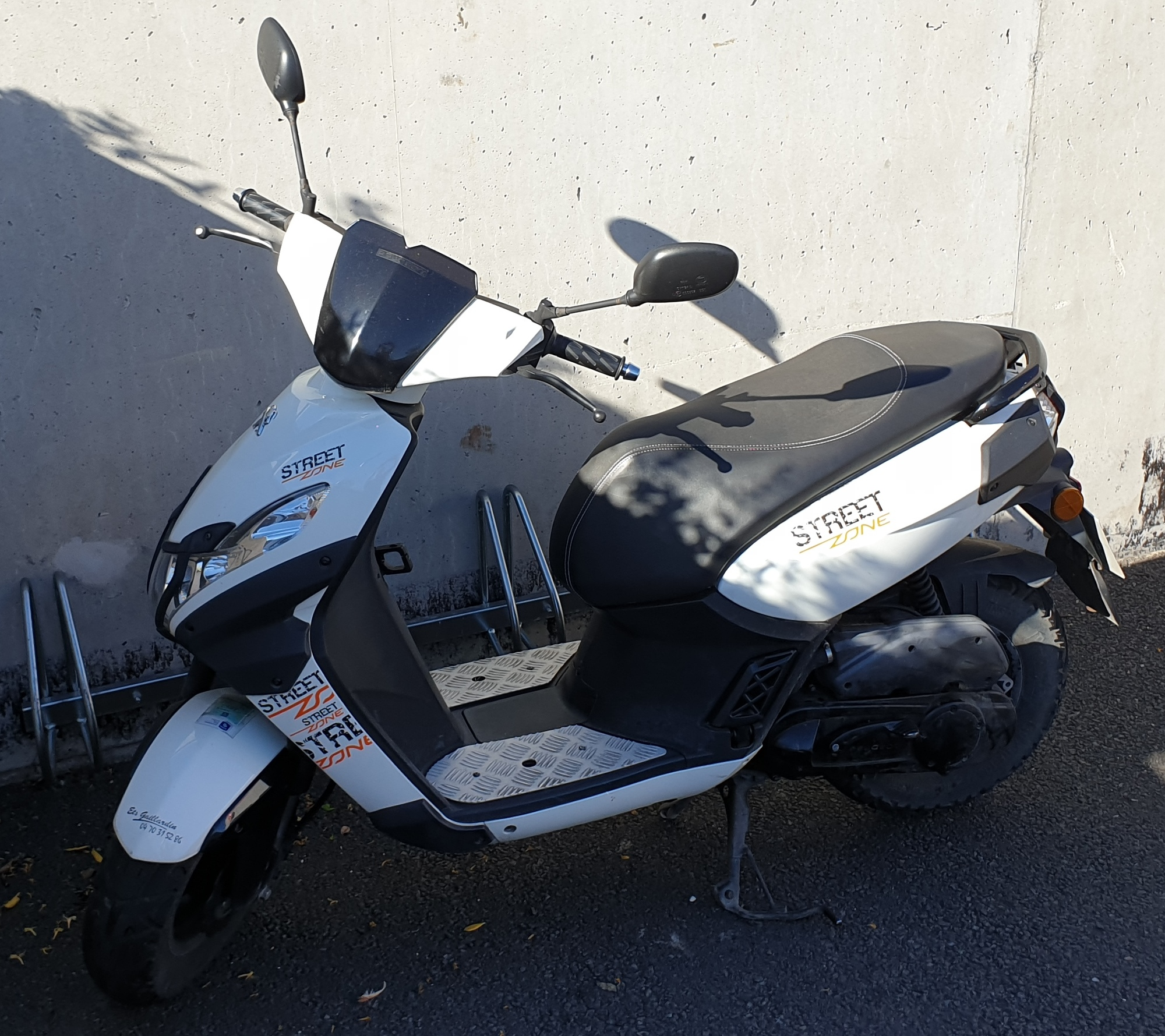
- Peugeot Streetzone in Bellerive-sur-Allier
- Manufacturer: Peugeot Motocycles
- Also called: Peugeot e-Streetzone
- Production: 2013–present
- Assembly: Jinan, China
- Predecessor: Peugeot Trekker
- Class: Scooter
- Engine: 50 cc (3.1 cu in) two-stroke engine or electric motor
- Fuel capacity: 1.53 kWh battery

The Peugeot Streetzone is a scooter produced since 2013 by Peugeot Motocycles. An electric version, named the Peugeot e-Streetzone, was unveiled at the 2022 Paris Motor Show and will be available from 2023 with one or two batteries and a maximum range of 112 km (70 mi).

== History ==
Presented at the EICMA in November 2013, the Streetzone is a small low-wheeled scooter intended above all for young people. It was created to replace the previous Trekker and is produced in China in the Jinan plant, headquarters of the joint venture Jinan Qingqi-Peugeot Motorcycles.

It features a sporty bodywork design, flat platform and "naked" handlebar without a plastic protective shell. It presents an engine range consisting of a 50 two-stroke engine and a 100 four-stroke engine version with 10" tires combined with knobby tires or 12" with roads.

The telescopic fork is visible and on models with 12” wheels it is painted, the side platforms are in aluminium, furthermore all models have a bumper kit to protect the bodywork and lights.

The muffler is of the reverse racing type, the braking system is made up of a 190 mm Shuricane front disc and a 110 mm rear and drum. The engine of the fifty is an air-cooled 49.9 cc two-stroke that delivers 3 kW (4.1 HP) and is approved Euro 2. The 100 engine is a 102 cc four-stroke that delivers 5 kW (6.8 HP) and is Euro 3 approved.

At EICMA 2016, the MY2017 range is presented, reduced to just the Euro 3 approved 50 engine, while the 100 version goes out of production due to low sales.

At the end of 2018, the two-stroke fifty was homologated Euro 4.

In 2021, the new four-stroke engine 50 homologated Euro 5 makes its debut, sending the old two-stroke into retirement. The new 50 is air-cooled, delivers 2.6 kW (3.5 HP) at 7700 rpm and maximum torque of 3.2 Nm at 7300 rpm. It is offered only with 10” knobby tyres.

== Peugeot e-Streetzone electric ==
The electric version, called e-Streetzone, was presented at the 2022 Paris Motor Show and is approved as an L1e moped (equivalent to a fifty moped). It is available with one or two removable batteries with a declared range of 61 km (version with one battery) and 112 km (version with double battery). There are two driving modes, Eco with a maximum speed limited to 25 km/h and Boost which reaches 45 km/h. The weight varies from 90 kg for the single battery version up to 102 kg with two batteries. Production is expected from 2023. In addition to these two models, a Cargo version with double battery, single-seater saddle and rear steel luggage rack is planned.
