= Peugeot Rapido =

Two-wheeled scooter

The Peugeot Rapido is a 50cc scooter built by Peugeot. The Rapido is classed as a moped and has a top speed of either 45 km/h or 25 km/h. It’s the successor of the Peugeot ST which was made from 1985 to 1992 and the Peugeot SC which was made from 1983 to 1992.

The Rapido was made from 1990 to 1995 and has the engine of a first-generation Honda Vision. It was popular in the 90s because of its handling and the bright colour options.

The Rapido came with a two-stroke engine and weighed around 60 kilograms in total.

== See also ==
- List of scooters
- List of scooter manufacturers
