= Peugeot Vivacity =

Range of motor scooters

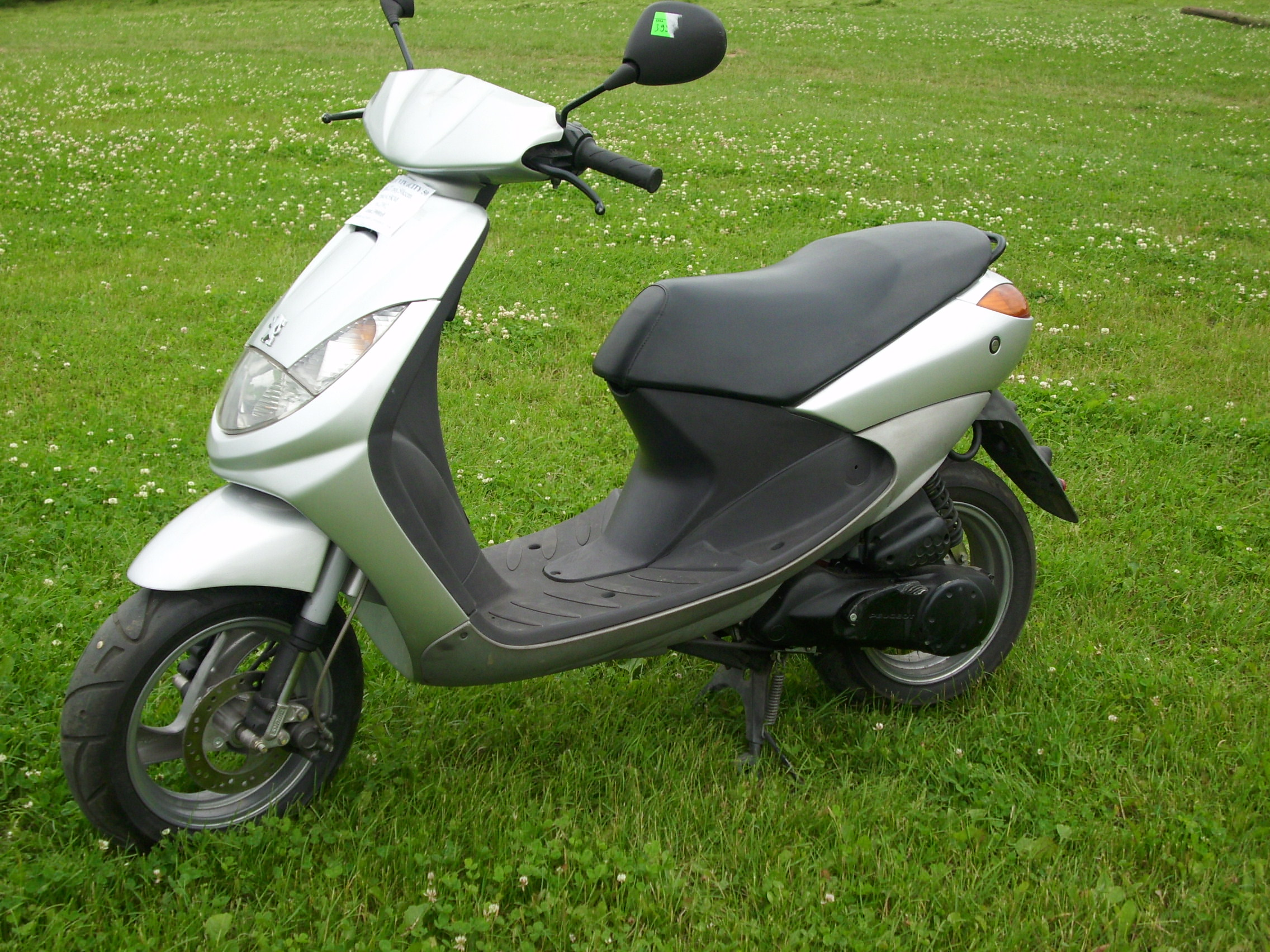
Peugeot Vivacity 50

The Vivacity is a range of motor scooters produced by the French motorcycle manufacturer Peugeot Motocycles.

== Vivacity 1+2 ==
Peugeot Motocycles began producing the Vivacity 1+2 in 1998 and continued until 2008 when it was redesigned. One of the most powerful 50cc standard scooters, in its original specification, this version could reach 75 km/h (47 mph). This model came to compete with the Yamaha BWs 50cc. It can reach 9000 rpm, producing 4.7 hp (3.5 kW). The Vivacity 1+2 proved be one of Peugeot's biggest commercial successes owing to its design and economical and powerful motor. The engines are easy to modify and can make a performance racing moped.

== Vivacity 3 ==
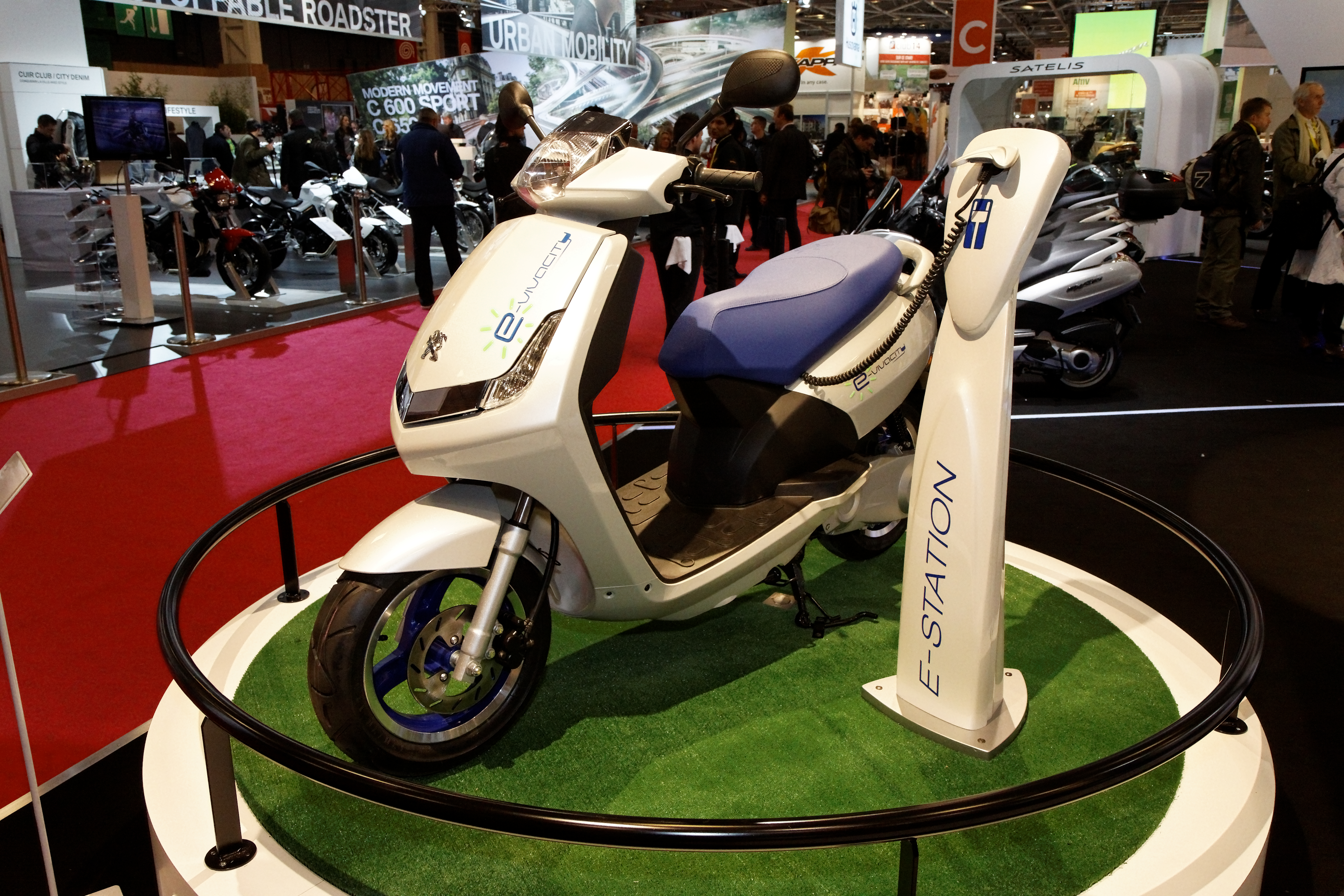
Peugeot e-Vivacity at the Motorcycle and Scooter Show in Paris, 2011

In 2008 Peugeot unveiled a new design for the Vivacity. With a bigger storage area under the seat and in the front plastics it has almost twice the storage capabilities of the Vivacity 1+2. Also new is a 12-volt charger for any accessories such as satellite navigation.

The 125 cc (7.6 cu in) version produced 8.5 bhp (6.3 kW) and fuel consumption was 48 mpg_{‑imp} (5.9 L/100 km; 40 mpg_{‑US}). Dry weight was 118 kg (260 lb).

In 2012, an electric version of the scooter called E-Vivacity was produced.
