= Mandeure =

- Commune
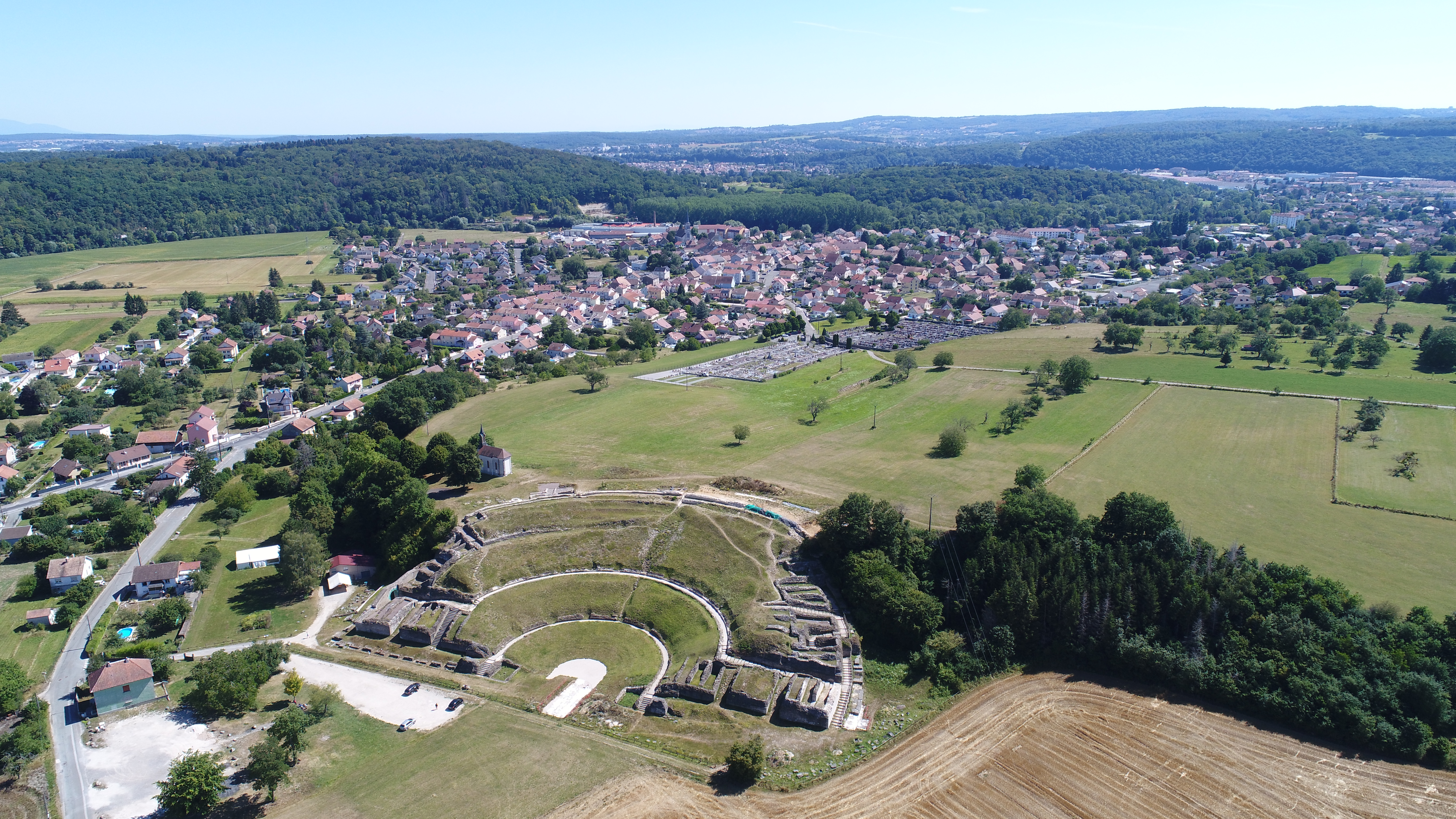
- A general view of Mandeure

- Coat of arms
- Location of Mandeure
- Location within France Location within Bourgogne-Franche-Comté
- Coordinates: 47°27′07″N 6°48′22″E
- Country: France
- Region: Bourgogne-Franche-Comté
- Department: Doubs
- Arrondissement: Montbéliard
- Canton: Valentigney
- Intercommunality: Pays de Montbéliard Agglomération

Government
  - Mayor (2020–2026): Jean-Pierre Hocquet
- Area^{1}: 15.13 km^{2} (5.84 sq mi)
- Highest elevation: 581 m (1,906 ft)
- Lowest elevation: 324 m (1,063 ft)
- Population (2023): 4,612
  - Density: 304.8/km^{2} (789.5/sq mi)
- Time zone: UTC+01:00 (CET)
  - Summer (DST): UTC+02:00 (CEST)
- INSEE/Postal code: 25367 /25350
- ^{1} French Land Register data, which excludes lakes, ponds, glaciers > 1 km^{2} (0.386 sq mi or 247 acres) and river estuaries.

Mandeure (French pronunciation: [mɑ̃dœʁ]) is a commune in the Doubs department in the Bourgogne-Franche-Comté region in eastern France.

== History ==
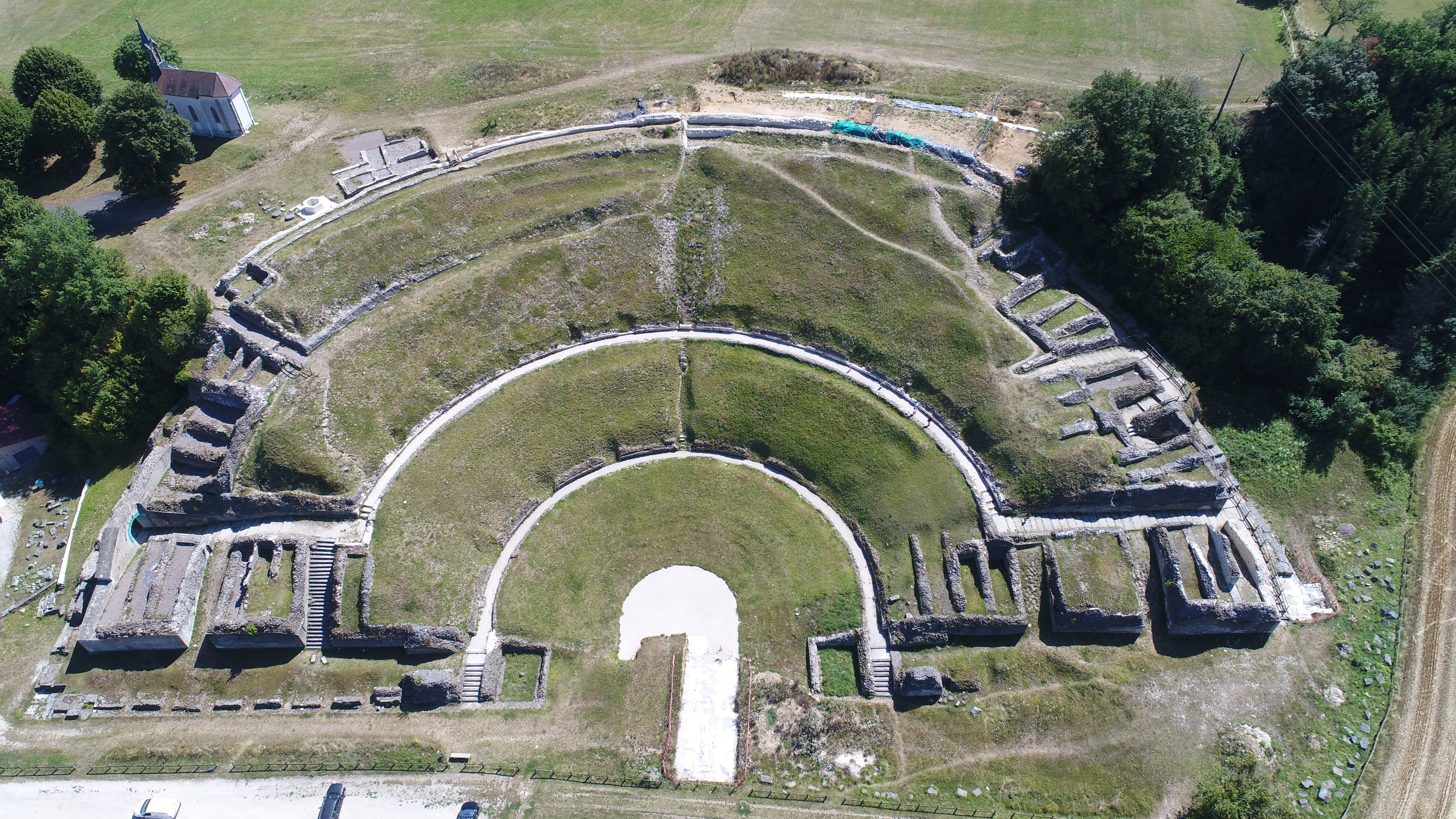
Roman theater of Mandeure

Mandeure was a Roman town called Epamanduodurum. It reached its apogee in the 2nd century. The Roman theater was one of the largest in Gaul, measuring 142 m with four levels of seats that could seat 12,000 to 15,000 spectators. Free guided tours are available by contacting the mayor's office.

== Population ==
Historical population
Year	Pop.	±% p.a.
1968	5,550	—
1975	6,596	+2.50%
1982	6,105	−1.10%
1990	5,402	−1.52%
1999	5,142	−0.55%
2007	5,022	−0.29%
2012	4,878	−0.58%
2017	4,819	−0.24%
2023	4,612	−0.73%
Source: INSEE

== See also ==
- Communes of the Doubs department
