= Ather 450 =

Indian electric scooter

- Manufacturer: Ather Energy
- Production: 2018―Present
- Assembly: Whitefield, Bangalore, India
- Class: Electric scooter
- Engine: 5.4 kW PMSM electric motor
- Top speed: 90 km/h (56 mph)
- Power: 7.2 BHP
- Torque: 20.5 Nm
- Transmission: Automatic
- Suspension: Front: telescopic fork Rear: symmetrically mounted progressive mono-shock
- Brakes: Front: Disc 200 mm (7.9 in); Rear: Disc 190 mm (7.5 in)
- Tires: Tubeless 12 inch
- Wheelbase: 1,278 mm (50.3 in)
- Dimensions: L: 1,800 mm (71 in); W: 700 mm (28 in); H: 1,250 mm (49 in)
- Seat height: 765 mm (30.1 in)
- Weight: 118 kg (260 lb) (wet)
- Fuel capacity: 3.7 kWh Lithium-ion battery
- Range: 146 km (91 mi)

The Ather 450X is an electric scooter manufactured by Ather Energy in India. It was launched in Bengaluru in September 2018. It is powered by a 5.4 kW (7.2 BHP) Brushless DC electric motor, and a 3.7 kWh lithium-ion battery pack. The scooter can accelerate 0–40 km/h (0–25 mph) in 3.3 seconds. It has a top speed of 90 km/h (56 mph) with a Certified Range of 146 km (91 mi).

== History ==
The Ather 450 was first unveiled in February 2016 while aiming for a 2016 or early-2017 launch. But after delays it was finally launched in September 2018 in Bengaluru along with its lower-end sibling, the Ather 340. Ather 340 was later discontinued due to low demand.

The scooter was made available in Chennai in October 2019 with 10 charging stations set up across the city.

In January 2020, Ather Energy introduced Ather 450X, quicker, more intelligent than its predecessor Ather 450. Deliveries of Ather 450X started in November and is now available in Bengaluru, Chennai, Delhi-NCR, Mumbai, Pune, Ahmedabad, Trivandrum, Mysore, Hubli, Jaipur, and Hyderabad.

In September 2020, Ather Energy unveiled the collector's edition of the Ather 450X, called Series 1 for the customers who pre-ordered Ather 450X. In July 2022, Ather Energy launched a new model of Ather 450X which is Ather 450X Gen 3. This is the updated version of Ather 450X Gen2 and the starting price is INR 1,57,500

== Features ==
The scooter features a 7-inch touchscreen dashboard, and comes with features like on-board navigation, diagnostics, all-LED lighting, fast charging, reverse parking assist, auto-cancelling indicators, smartphone integration, and cloud connectivity to send and receive data from Ather's servers. It also has an incognito mode that does not share the user's GPS data with Ather.

Ather Energy offers an upgraded version of Ather 450 called the Ather 450 Plus, which has a top speed of 70 kmph and a True Range of 70 km in Eco mode. The Ather 450 Plus offers 4G connectivity, onboard navigation, and other connected features but does not have Bluetooth connectivity and the Warp mode. Some more features included in Ather 450 Plus are Park assist and side stand sensor.

== Ather 450X ==
In January 2020, Ather unveiled the 450X model that included few performance and cosmetic updates. These include a 3.3 kW motor (Nominal power, peak power 6 kW) that outputs 4.4 BHP of power and 26 Nm (Max) of torque, higher capacity 2.9 kWh battery, top speed of 85 km/h (53 mph) and overall weight reduction of 11 kg (24 lb). 0–40 km/h (0–25 mph) can now be done within 3.3 seconds.

Ather 450X has a 4G SIM card and Wi-Fi along with Bluetooth connectivity and the new 7” touchscreen dashboard, comes with a colour depth of 16M and a Snapdragon Quad Core processor. Ather 450X utilises Android Open Source to offer map navigation, On-board diagnostics and features like Over-the-air updates, Auto Indicator off and Guide-me-home lights. Ather 450X has a boot capacity of 22 liters.

The scooter is available in Bengaluru, Chennai, Delhi-NCR, Mumbai, Pune, Ahmedabad, Kochi, Mysore, Hubli, Jaipur, and Hyderabad and will be available in 16 more Indian cities in 2021.

== Ather 450X Series 1 ==
The limited-edition Ather 450X Series 1 scooter was available only to those Ather Energy enthusiasts who pre-ordered the scooter before the national launch of the Ather 450X on January 28, 2020.

The Ather 450X Series 1 has translucent panels in the rear, that offer a peek inside the scooter. Ather Energy's distinct cast aluminium chassis is visible under the seat and the trellis frame. The Series 1 comes with a high-gloss metallic black body colour combined with accents of red. These colours also feature on the 7” touchscreen dashboard of the Series 1 scooters, with a special intro screen and subtle hints of red in the UI designed for the scooters.

Ather Energy started deliveries of its latest Ather 450X Series 1 from November 2020.

== See also ==
- Similar Electric Vehicles
  - TVS iQube
  - Ola S1
  - Kinetic E-Luna
  - Ather Rizta
- Other Scooters in India
  - Honda Activa
  - Honda Dio
  - TVS Jupiter
  - Suzuki Access 125
- Plug-in electric vehicles in India
