= Ather Energy =

Indian electric vehicle manufacturer company

Ather Energy Ltd.
- Type: Public
- Traded as: NSE: ATHERENERG; BSE: 544397
- Industry: Automotive; Electric vehicles; Motorcycle
- Founded: 2013; 13 years ago
- Founders: Tarun Mehta; Swapnil Jain
- Headquarters: Bengaluru, Karnataka, India
- Area served: India; Nepal; Sri Lanka
- Products: Ather 450X; Ather 450X Pro; Ather 450S; Ather 450 Apex; Ather Rizta; Ather Konarc
- Production output: ▲51,749 (2022)
- Revenue: ▲₹3,672 crore (US$390 million) (2026)
- Operating income: ▼₹−408 crore (US$−44 million) (2026)
- Net income: ▼₹−517 crore (US$−55 million) (2026)
- Owners: Hero MotoCorp (40%); NIIF (16.92%); GIC (15.04%); Tarun Mehta (6.63%); Swapnil Jain (6.63%)
- Website: atherenergy.com
- Footnotes; Financials as of 31 March 2025.

Ather Energy is an Indian electric two-wheeler manufacturer headquartered in Bengaluru. It was founded by Tarun Mehta and Swapnil Jain in 2013. It manufactures electric scooters, including the Ather 450 series and Ather Rizta. It has EV manufacturing facilities in Whitefield, Bangalore, and Hosur, Tamil Nadu. It has also established an electric vehicle charging network across India called Ather Grid.

== History ==
Ather Energy was founded in 2013 by Tarun Mehta and Swapnil Jain. In early 2014, it received ₹4.5 million (US$48,000) from the Technology Development Board under the Department of Science and Technology, IIT Madras, and Srini V. Srinivasan, an IIT alumnus and founder of Aerospike. In December 2014, Flipkart founders, Sachin Bansal and Binny Bansal, invested $1 million as seed capital. In May 2015, it received $12 million from Tiger Global for investments in development, testing, production, and the launch of the vehicle.

On 23 February 2016, the company unveiled its first scooter, the S340, at a technology conference in Bengaluru. Hero MotoCorp invested ₹180 crore (US$19 million) in the Series B round of funding in October 2016. It invested again in 2018 to the tune of ₹130 crore (US$14 million).

In May 2019, Ather Energy raised $51 million in another round of funding, led by Sachin Bansal's investment of $32 million. Hero MotoCorp converted its convertible debt of $19 million as a part of this round. In addition to this, InnoVen Capital extended an $8 million venture debt.

In December 2019, Ather Energy signed an MoU with the Government of Tamil Nadu to set up a 400,000 sq ft (37,000 m^{2}) manufacturing plant for electric vehicles in Hosur. The invested amount will be around ₹635 crore (equivalent to ₹861 crore or US$92 million in 2026).

The company added two new products to its portfolio, the Ather 450X and the Ather 450 Plus, in January 2020.

In July 2020, Ather Energy raised $11.4 million from Hero MotoCorp as a part of its Series C round funding. In November 2020, Ather Energy raised a fresh round of ₹260 crore (US$28 million) as a part of the Series D round, led by Sachin Bansal's investment of ₹170 crore (US$18 million) and $12 million by Hero MotoCorp.

In September 2024, the company filed a DRHP with SEBI for a Rs 4,500 crore ($536.2 million) IPO at a valuation of $2.5 billion. The company said it will sell new shares worth $370 million in the IPO as well as up to 22 million shares from existing investors.

In May 2025, Ather Energy opened its initial public offering (IPO) and was listed on NSE and BSE.

== Production and infrastructure ==
On 2 January 2021, Ather Energy began operations at its production facility in Hosur, Tamil Nadu. The new Ather factory has an annual capacity of 110,000 scooters and 120,000 battery packs. The company currently has a presence in 27 cities across 15 states.

== Products ==
=== Ather 450S ===
The Ather 450S was launched on 11 August 2023, with a 5400-watt PMSM motor that generates a torque of 22 Nm. It offers a range of 115 km and a true range of 90 km on a single charge, and it has a top speed of 90 km/h. It takes 6 hours 36 minutes from 0–80% and 8 hours 36 minutes from 0–100% with a portable home charger.

It has features like an emergency stop signal (ESS), Vehicle FallSafe, a guide-me-on light, Trip Planner, and Theft & Tow Alerts.

=== Ather 450X ===
The Ather 450X has a 4G SIM card and Wi-Fi, along with Bluetooth connectivity and the new 7” touchscreen dashboard. It comes with a color depth of 16 million and a Snapdragon quad-core processor. Ather 450X utilizes Android Open Source to offer map navigation, on-board diagnostics, and features like over-the-air updates, auto-indicator off, and guide-me-home lights.

The Ather mobile app offers charging status, push navigation, theft & tow detection, live location & vehicle state tracking, a voice assistant, and welcome lights. The Ather 450X supports connected accessories like smart helmets and tire-pressure monitoring systems (TPMS).

=== Ather 450 ===
The Ather 450 is constructed using an all-aluminum frame, comes with a 3.3 kW/5.4 kW peak (7.2 BHP) brushless DC electric motor, and a 2.4 kWh lithium-ion battery pack. The scooter can accelerate to 40 km/h in 3.9 seconds, attain a top speed of 80 km/h, and travel 75 km on one charge in city-riding conditions (107 km in the Indian driving cycle).

=== Ather Rizta ===
The Ather Rizta is a family electric scooter launched in 2024. It comes with a 3.7 kWh lithium-Ion battery pack, which gives a range of 160 km on a full charge with a top speed of 80 km/h and has an acceleration of 0 to 40 km/h in 3.7 seconds. It comes with 34L of storage space.

== Other services ==
=== OTA updates ===
Ather Energy provides over-the-air (OTA) updates for its electric scooters. Ather Energy has rolled out 13 OTA updates as of 2020.

=== Ather Grid ===
Ather has set up its own charging network, dubbed Ather Grid, in 18 cities across India. These DC-fast-charging stations use Ather's proprietary charging method and connector to charge the Ather scooters at a rate of 1 km/min. The charging points are also equipped with a 3-pin socket to supply AC power to other electric vehicles that do not use Ather's connector. Other vehicles can connect to the charging point and start charging using the Ather Grid app for iOS and Android.

More than 120 fast charging grid points are installed across 18 cities in India. Ather has plans to set up around 300 fast charging stations across India by the end of 2021. Ather also sets up a home charging point at customers' homes, which will charge the Ather 450X overnight.

=== Ather Space ===
Ather Energy operates Experience Centers through its licensed dealer network. Ather currently has over 175 experience centers in 96 cities in India.

== See also ==
- TVS iQube Electric
- Gogoro
- Hero MotoCorp
- Okinawa Autotech
- Ola Electric
- Battery electric vehicle
- Plug-in electric vehicle
- List of modern production plug-in electric vehicles
