= Kinetic Honda =

Defunct motor vehicle manufacturers of India

- Industry: Automobile
- Founded: 1984
- Founder: H. K. Firodia
- Defunct: 2008
- Fate: Defunct
- Successor: Mahindra & Mahindra Limited
- Headquarters: Pune, India
- Area served: India, USA, UK, Turkey etc.
- Key people: H. K. Firodia, Arun Firodia, Sulajja Firodia Motwani, Ajinkya Firodia
- Products: Scooters, motorcycles
- Owner: Arun Firodia
- Parent: Kinetic Engineering Limited (Firodia Group)

Kinetic Honda was a joint venture between Kinetic Engineering Limited, India and Honda Motor Company, Japan. Kinetic was the first company to have a joint venture with HMSI. The partnership operated from 1984 to 1998, manufacturing two-stroke scooters in India. In 1998, the joint venture was terminated after which Kinetic Engineering continued to sell the models under the brand name Kinetic until 2008 when the interests were sold to Mahindra. Mahindra later wound up their two-wheeler business, owing to poor sales.

The brand Kinetic Honda is remembered for its legacy two-stroke scooters which were in fact based on the Honda NH series, with continuously variable transmission and electric start, first in India when it was launched (in 1984), and the only in India until the late 1990s.

== Model history ==
- 1984: Kinetic DX — 98cc, two-stroke, single mirror, black plastic finish
- 1984: Kinetic EX — 98cc, two-stroke, single mirror, black plastic finish, no indicators (replaced by black blocks), limited colour versions
- 1994: Kinetic ZX — 98cc, two-stroke, double mirror, wind shield, more graphical stickers, grey plastic finish
- 1995: Kinetic Marvel — 99cc, two-stroke, double mirror, wide shield, more graphical stickers, red, white and blackish blue plastic finish and with pure Honda 2 stroke Engine (Awarded Scooter Of The Year)
- 2000: Kinetic Y2K
- 2001: Kinetic ZX Zoom — 110cc, two-stroke; otherwise as the ZX
- 2002: Kinetic Nova
- 2005: Kinetic 4s — 111.5cc, four-stroke
- 2006: Kinetic Kine
- 2008: Kinetic Jupiter and Kinetic Blaze
