= Suzuki Access 125 =

Suzuki Access
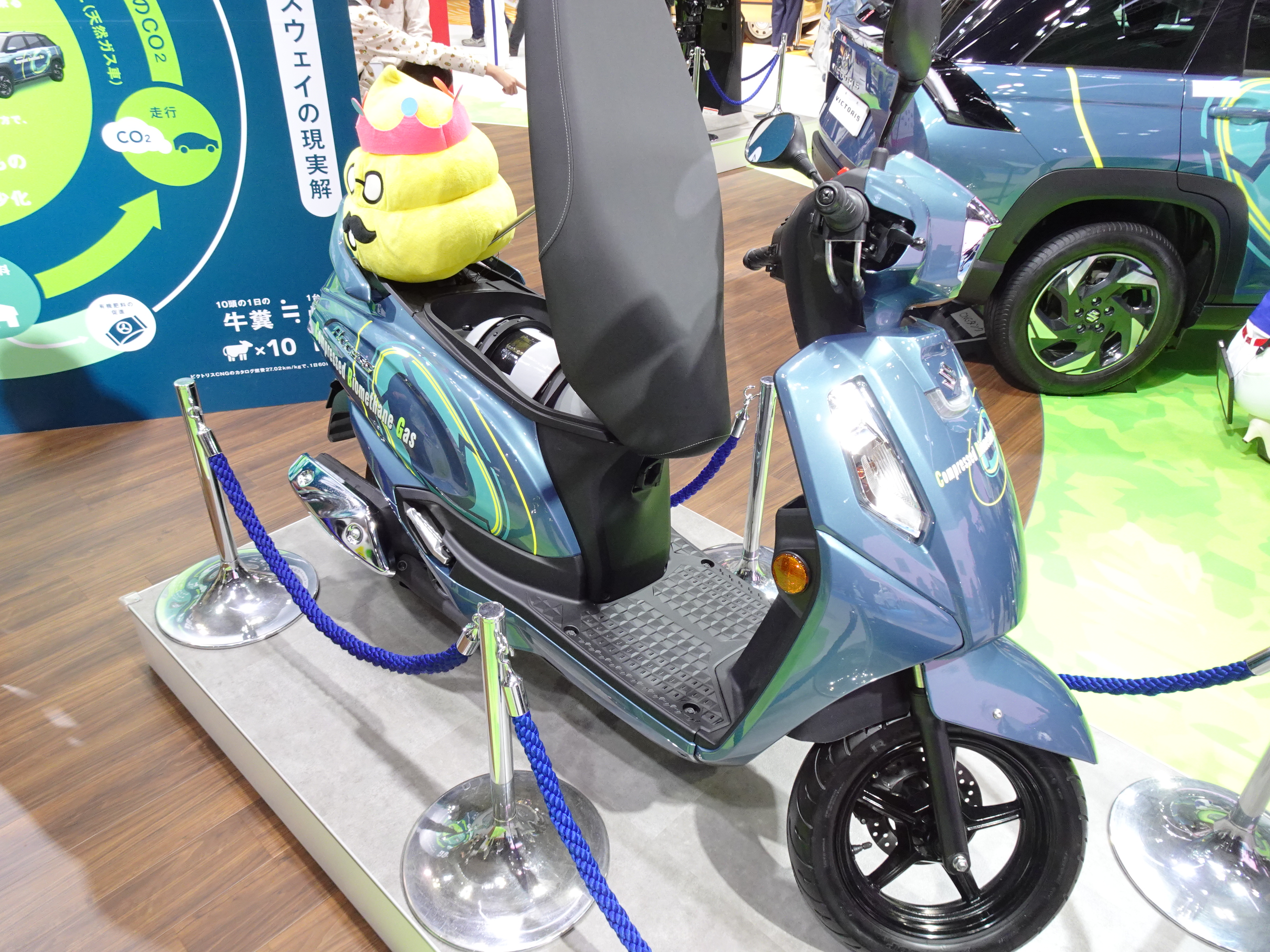
- Manufacturer: Suzuki Motorcycle India Limited
- Also called: Suzuki Address 125
- Parent company: Suzuki Motor Corporation
- Production: 2007-present
- Class: Scooter
- Engine: 124 cc (7.6 cu in), SOHC, four-stroke, single
- Top speed: 105 km/h (company claimed)
- Ignition type: CDI
- Transmission: Continuously variable automatic transmission
- Frame type: Steel
- Brakes: Drum: front and rear (120 mm dia)
- Wheelbase: 1,250 mm (49 in)
- Dimensions: L: 1,780 mm (70 in); W: 650 mm (26 in); H: 1,125 mm (44.3 in)
- Fuel capacity: 5.6 ltrs.6 L (1.3 imp gal; 1.6 US gal)

The Suzuki Access 125 is a scooter produced by the Japanese motorcycle company Suzuki through its Indian subsidiary. It was introduced on September 18, 2007. A similar model called the Swish 125 was produced from 2012 to 2016.

On October 3, 2013, in collaboration with Bollywood superstar Salman Khan's Being Human foundation, Suzuki launched the special 'Being Human' edition of the Suzuki Access 125. The special edition is available only in Pear Mirage White colour and features ‘Apna Way of life’ logo. Other features in the Special Edition include beige leather seat cover, chrome grab rail and rear view mirrors. The special edition Access 125 is more expensive than the standard edition of Access 125. It is currently in its third generation and currently sold in India, whereas Swish 125 manufacturing discontinued in year 2016. The Special Edition was available for a limited period.

A special edition based on the Access 125 now available in 2018 and is currently sold as regular product along with its normal siblings. Special edition is available in white, silver, matte black and matte red colour. Special edition is having round chrome mirrors, leather seats, black alloy wheels and disc brake in front with combined breaking system and mobile charging socket.

As of 2026 the Access 125 is sold as the Address 125 in Europe.

== Variants ==
Total three types of the Access 125 models available in the Indian market as:

- Drum brakes with CBS (colours are: white, silver, black, red, grey)
- Disc brakes and silver colour alloy wheels with CBS (colours are: white, silver, black, red, grey)
- Special edition having black alloy wheels and disc brakes with CBS. (white, silver, matte red and matte black)

All Suzuki Access 125s manufactured after 2016 have SEP engines and part digital part analogue display and Ride Connect Variants feature a fully digital display cluster with Bluetooth connectivity and Navigation Features enabled once a phone is paired. Also they feature special matte paint schemes along with LED parking lights and headlamp cluster as standard only in the Ride Connect Variants

== See also ==
- Ather Rizta
- TVS Jupiter
- TVS I-Qube
- Kinetic E-Luna
- Honda Activa
- Honda Dio
- Piagio Vespa
