= Ather Rizta =

Indian electric scooter

- Manufacturer: Ather Energy
- Production: 2024–present
- Assembly: Whitefield, Bangalore, India
- Class: Electric scooter
- Top speed: 80 km/h (50 mph)
- Brakes: Front: Disc brake Rear: Drum brake
- Tires: MRF Zapper tubeless 12-inch alloy wheels
- Wheelbase: 1.285 m (50.6 in)
- Dimensions: L: 1.850 m (72.8 in); W: 0.750 m (29.5 in); H: 1.140 m (44.9 in)
- Seat height: 780 mm (31 in)
- Weight: 119 kg (262 lb) (dry)
- Related: Ather 450

The Ather Rizta is a family electric scooter manufactured by Indian Scooter company Ather Energy.

The Ather Rizta was launched during the Ather Community Day in Bengaluru on April 6, 2024. Developed under codename project Diesel, It is slated to be the brands most mass-market model yet. Ather has based the Scooter on the Ather 450 Platform developed by the company.

Ather has launched the Scooter in two variants, Rizta S and Rizta Z with a 2.9 and a 3.5kwh lithium-ion battery packs respectively. The Scooter has 34L under-seat storage capacity, Bluetooth connectivity, turn-by-turn navigation, USB connectivity and a multilingual 7-inch TFT instrument cluster running Atherstack 6, a version of Android with 16GB of storage and 8GB of RAM.

== Variants ==
Ather Rizta variants (as of September 2026)
Variant	Battery	Claimed range (IDC)	Price (ex-showroom)
Rizta S	2.7 kWh (LFP) / 2.9 kWh (NMC)	123 km	₹1.21 lakh (US$1,300)
Rizta Z	2.7 kWh (LFP) / 2.9 kWh (NMC)	123 km	₹1.39 lakh (US$1,400)
Rizta S	3.5 kWh (NMC)	161 km	₹1.44 lakh (US$1,500)
Rizta Z	3.5 kWh (NMC)	161 km	₹1.59 lakh (US$1,700)

== Updates ==
- July 2026: Battery packs revised from 2.9 kWh/3.7 kWh to 2.7 kWh/3.5 kWh; the smaller pack gained an LFP cell-chemistry option alongside the existing NMC cells, and charging time on the 900 W charger fell to 3 hours 12 minutes (0–80%) from 4 hours 30 minutes.
- 2025: the Rizta Z's instrument console gained touchscreen support and a new Eco mode via an over-the-air software update.
- July 2026: a "Pothole+ Alerts" feature, using crowdsourced data from other Ather scooters, was added to the Rizta Z via an OTA update.

== Sales ==
Date	Cumulative units sold
April 2024	Launch
c. February 2025	100,000
October 2025	200,000
April 2026	300,000 (76% of Ather Energy's total FY2026 dispatches)

== See also ==
- Ather 450
- Honda Activa
- Honda Dio
- Kinetic E-Luna
- Ola S1
- Plug-in electric vehicles in India
- Suzuki Access 125
- TVS iQube
- TVS Jupiter
