= TVS Jupiter =

Indian scooter

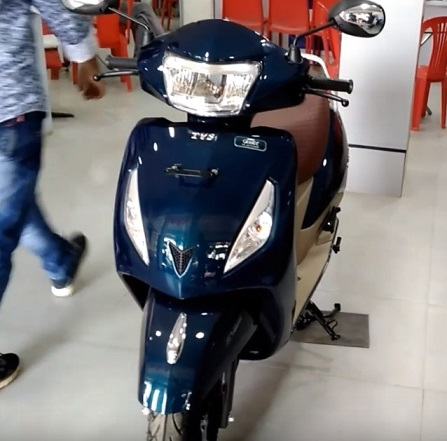
- TVS Jupiter Grande
- Manufacturer: TVS Motor Company
- Also called: Jupiter; TVS Calisto (Indonesia)
- Production: 2013–present
- Class: Standard
- Engine: 113 cc (6.9 cu in) CVT-I, 4-stroke, air-cooled, OHC, single-cylinder
- Power: 5.88 kW (7.89 bhp; 7.99 PS) @ 7,500 rpm
- Torque: 8 N⋅m (5.9 lb⋅ft) @ 5,500 rpm
- Transmission: Primary CVT & secondary gearbox
- Suspension: telescopic suspension (front), gas charged mono-shock (rear)
- Brakes: Front: 130 mm drum/disc, Rear: 130 mm drum
- Wheelbase: 1,275 mm (50.2 in)
- Dimensions: L: 1,834 mm (72.2 in); W: 650 mm (26 in); H: 1,115 mm (43.9 in)
- Weight: 104 kg (229 lb) (dry)
- Fuel capacity: 5.3 L (1.2 imp gal; 1.4 US gal); Reserve: 1 L (0.22 imp gal; 0.26 US gal)
- Related: TVS Wego, TVS Scooty, TVS Scooty Zest

The TVS Jupiter is a variomatic scooter launched in September 2013 by India's TVS Motor Company. The launch of the scooter marked the company's entry into the part of the market that mainly targets both male and female consumers. This Variomatic Scooter is launched as a competitor of Honda Activa.

In July 2018, TVS Jupiter crossed the 2.5 million unit sales mark and became the second most sold scooter in India. On 7 October 2021, TVS Launched the 125 cc variant of the Jupiter in order to compete with the TVS Ntorq, Honda Activa 125 and Suzuki Access 125. and uses an all new 124.8 cc engine. In 2024, the Second generation Jupiter was launched in India which uses a 113 cc engine.

== Overview ==
The Jupiter is powered by a single-cylinder, four-stroke, 110 cc (6.7 cu in) engine and delivers 5.88 kW (7.89 hp; 7.99 PS) at 7,500 rpm. The scooter delivers a pick-up of 0 to 60 km/h (37 mph) in 11.2 seconds. The scooter has an 'Econometer' and has a fuel efficiency of 49 km/L (2.0 L/100 km; 120 mpg_{‑US}), per the manufacturer.

=== Special Edition ===
In 2015, TVS Motor Company launched a new limited volume variant of the Jupiter, called the TVS Jupiter Scooter-of-the-Year Special Edition, created to celebrate the TVS Jupiter being named Scooter of the Year 2014 in India.

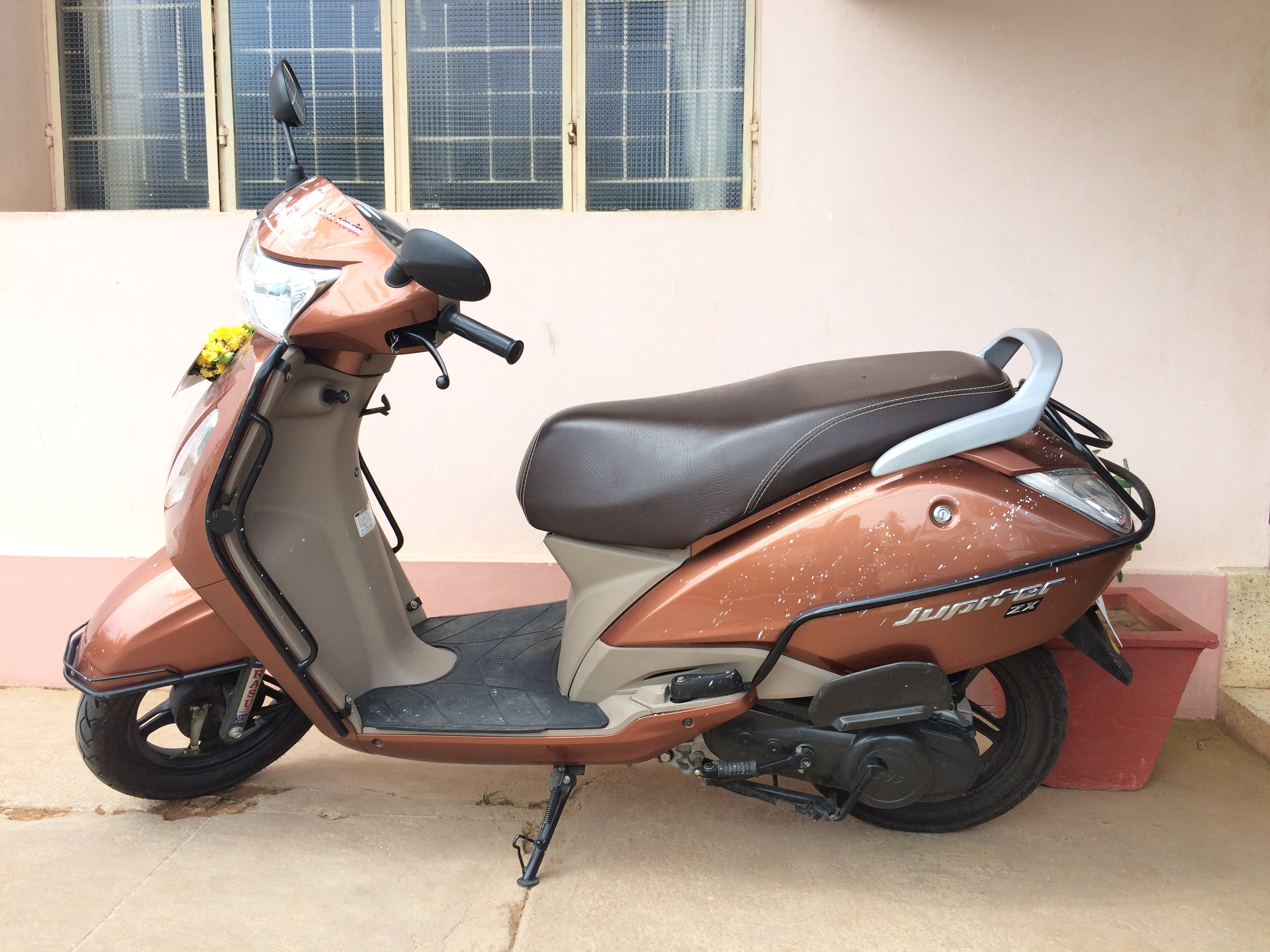
TVS Jupiter Scooter 2015 model in India

TVS has successfully launched many models, such as the TVS Jupiter ZX, TVS Jupiter Classic, and the most recent TVS Jupiter Grande.

=== Jupiter 110 (2024) ===
The 2024 model of the TVS Jupiter 110 was launched with a redesigned exterior, a new look was introduced, and an updated 113.3 cc engine that produces 7.9 bhp (5.9 kW; 8.0 PS) and up to 9.8 N⋅m (7.2 lb⋅ft) of torque with the iGO assist feature. Notable features of the 2024 Jupiter 110 include LED lighting, a digital console, and SmartXonnect technology, which enables Bluetooth navigation and notifications. Practical elements include a front-mounted fuel cap, a USB charging port, and an expanded 30-litre under-seat storage. The updated chassis, adapted from the TVS Jupiter 125, supports 12-inch wheels and a floorboard-mounted fuel tank, improving stability and ride quality.

== Awards ==
In 2014, the NDTV Car & Bike Awards named the TVS Jupiter the Scooter of the Year. The TVS Jupiter also won awards from BBC Top Gear India and Bike India, which named it the Scooter of the Year, making it the most awarded scooter in India. It also won the award for Excellence in Branding & Marketing at the 5th CMO Asia Awards by World Brand Congress. TVS reached 500,000 scooters on the road in 18 months, which is a record in the Indian two-wheeler industry.

== See also ==
- Ather Rizta
- Honda Activa
- Honda Dio
- TVS I-Qube
- Kinetic E-Luna
- Suzuki Acces 125
- Piagio Vespa
