= Syed Asif Ali =

Indian rider

Syed Asif Ali is a Bhopal based rider who competes with TVS Racing, the first factory racing team in India with a legacy of over 35 years. He has been associated with TVS Racing for over four years now and under the banner has won the Indian National Rally Championship 2W organised by the Federation of Motor Sports Clubs of India back to back in 2015 and 2016. Additionally, he also won the treacherous Gulf Monsoon Scooter Rally and the Dakshin Dare Rally astride a TVS Wego in 2016. He secured the third place in the Gulf Monsoon Scooter Rally 2017 by completing the rally in 25.44 seconds.
