= TVS Ntorq 125 =

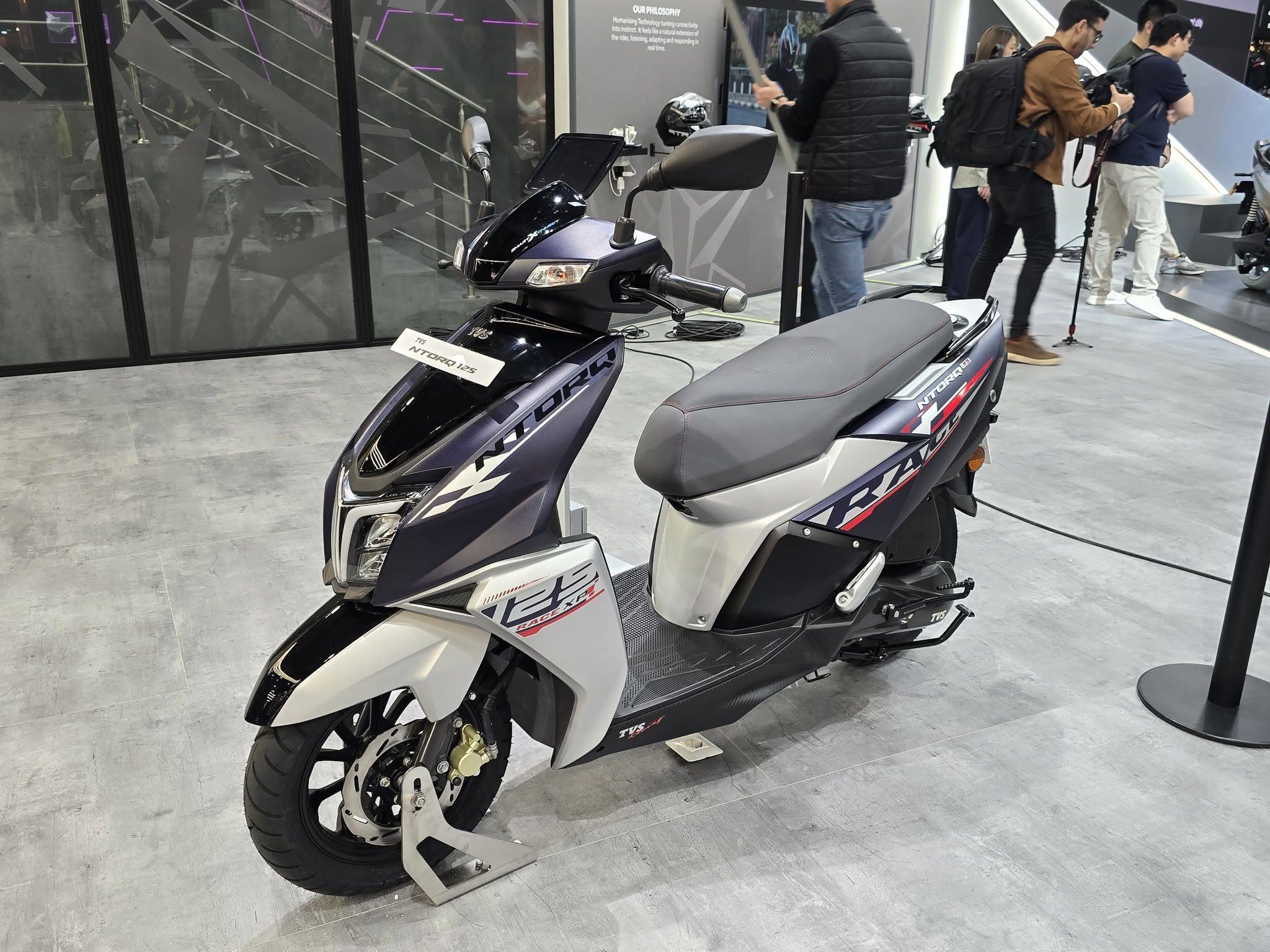
- TVS Ntorq 125 Race XP
- Manufacturer: TVS Motor Company
- Production: 2018–present
- Class: Scooter
- Engine: 124.79 cc (7.615 cu in), OHC, four-stroke, air cooled, single cylinder
- Top speed: 95 km/h (59 mph)
- Power: 6.9 kW @ 7500 rpm/9.4 PS @ 7500 rpm
- Torque: 10.5 Nm @ 5500 rpm
- Ignition type: Kick/Self
- Transmission: CVT
- Frame type: High Rigidity Under Bone Rectangular Tube Type
- Suspension: Front: Telescopic Suspension; Rear:Gas filled Hydraulic Type Coil Spring Shock Absorber
- Brakes: Front: Disc (220 mm (8.7 in)); Rear: Dia Drum (130 mm (5.1 in))
- Tires: Tubeless
- Wheelbase: 1,285 mm (50.6 in)
- Dimensions: L: 1,865 mm (73.4 in); W: 710 mm (28 in); H: 1,160 mm (46 in)
- Seat height: 765 mm (30.1 in)
- Weight: 116 kg (256 lb) (dry)
- Fuel capacity: 5.0 litres (1.1 imp gal; 1.3 US gal)

TVS Ntorq 125 is a motor scooter manufactured by TVS Motor Company in India. It is powered by a single-cylinder, four-stroke, three-valve engine and delivers 6.9 kW (9.4 PS) at 7500 rpm. The scooter accelerates from 0 to 60 km/h in 6.5 seconds. It requires approximately 800 ml of engine oil. The scooter has a claimed top speed of 95 km/h. It is TVS’ first 125 cc scooter with connectivity - Bluetooth enabled.

Launched in February 2018, with TVS claims several firsts for the Ntorq 125 in the Indian scooter market, including Bluetooth connected speedometer (with navigation assistant, caller ID, top-speed recorder, in-built lap-timer and service reminder), engine kill switch, stealth inspired styling, among others.

In 2020, TVS launched Ntorq 125 with BS-VI emission standard. The new TVS Ntorq 125 comes in eight colour options and three variants.

== Variants ==
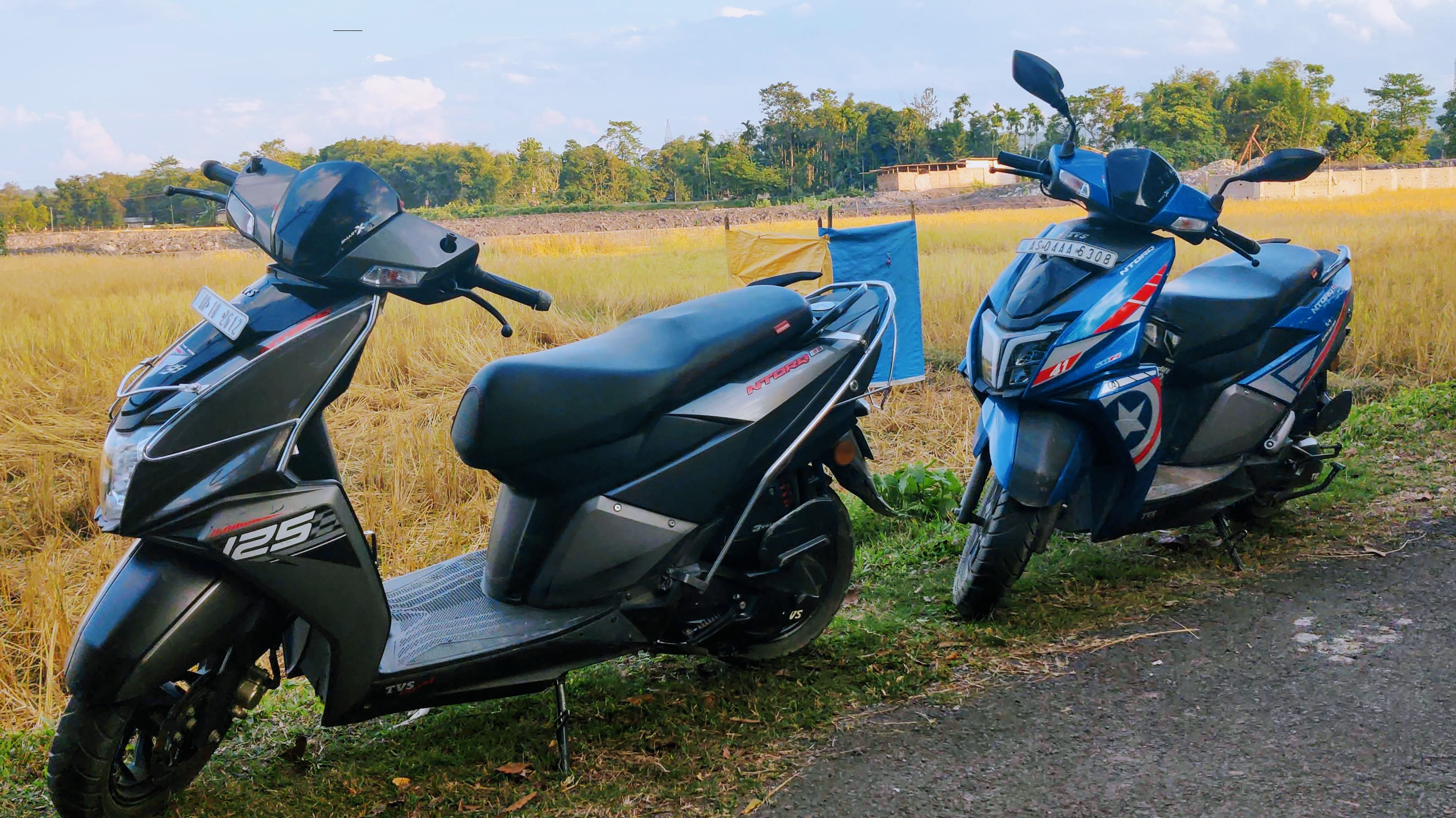
TVS Ntroq Standard Edition and TVS Ntroq Marvel Edition

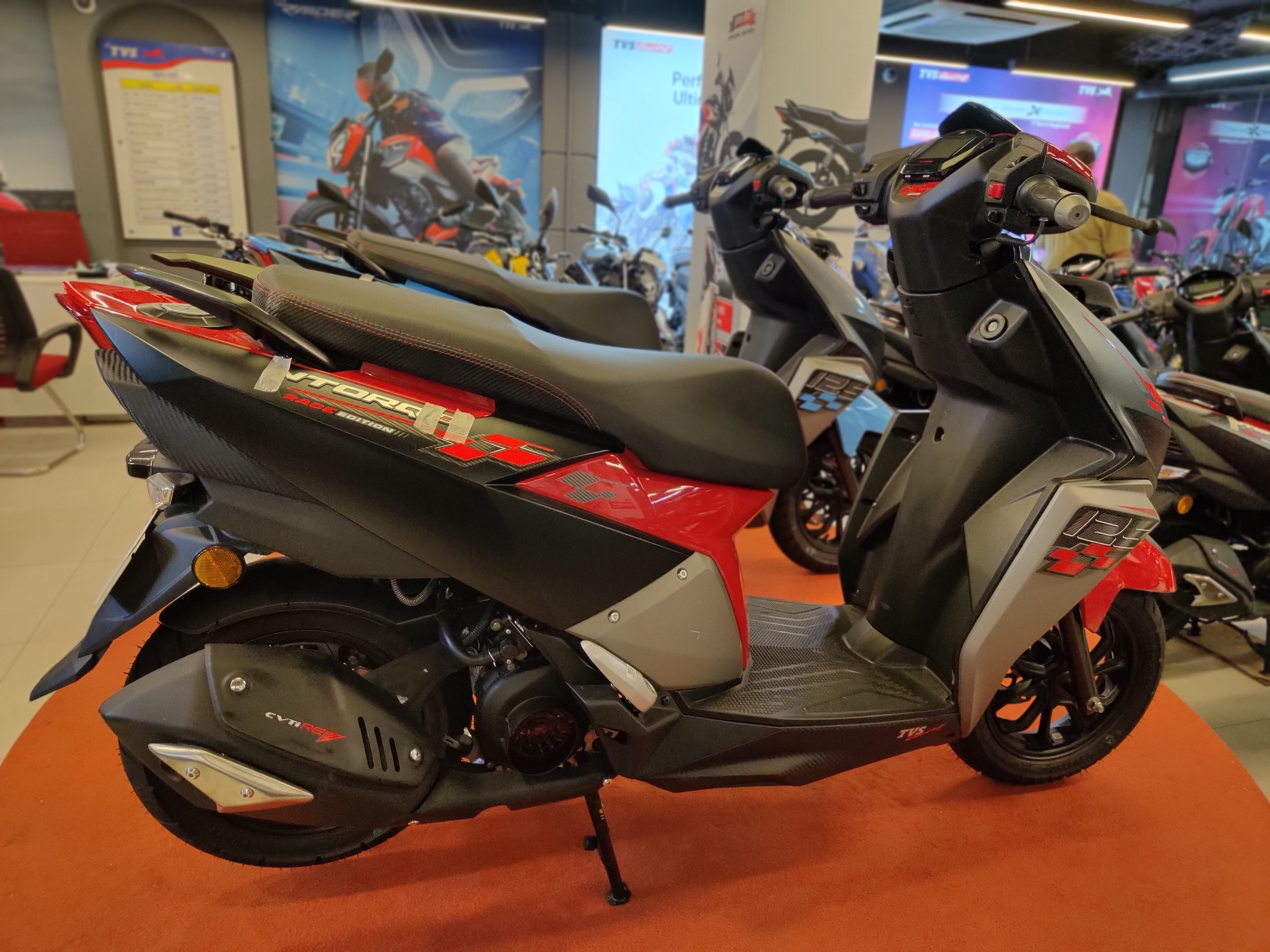
TVS Ntroq Race Edition, Red Color
- Ntorq 125 Standard
- Ntorq 125 Race Edition
- Ntorq 125 Super Squad Edition
- Ntorq 125 Race XP
- Ntorq 125 XT

== See also ==
- TVS Jupiter
- TVS Scooty
