= TVS Wego =

Indian scooter

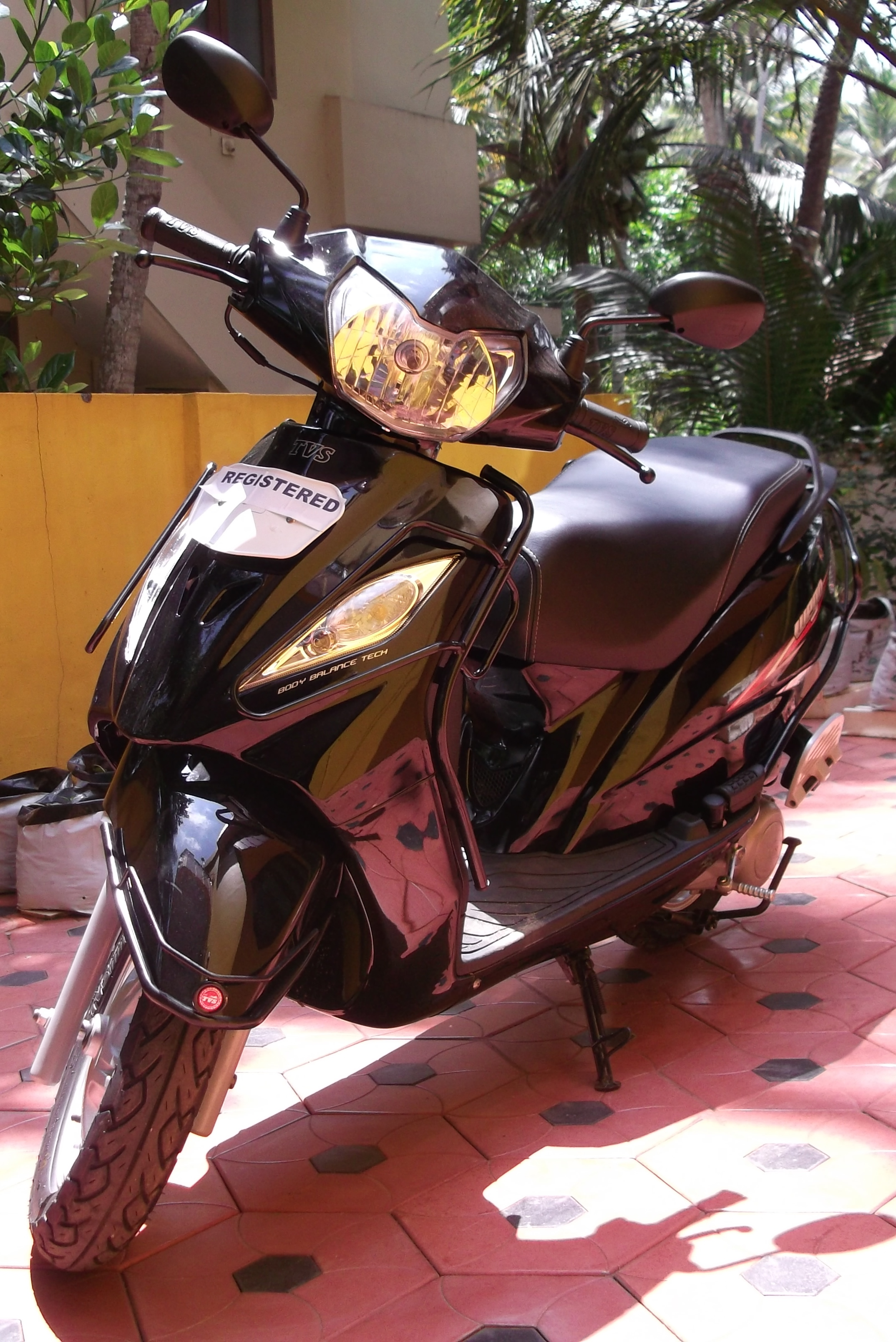
- Manufacturer: TVS Motor Company
- Production: 2010–2020 (India); 2011–present (Overseas)
- Predecessor: TVS Scooty
- Successor: TVS Jupiter
- Engine: 110 cc (6.7 cu in) CVT-I, 4 Stroke, air-cooled, single, spark ignition
- Power: 5.88 kW (7.89 hp; 7.99 PS) @ 7500 rpm
- Torque: 8.4 N⋅m (6.2 lb⋅ft) @ 5500 rpm
- Transmission: CVT
- Suspension: Front: Advanced telescopic suspension Rear: Unit swing, gas-filled hydraulic damper
- Fuel capacity: 5 L (1.1 imp gal; 1.3 US gal)
- Related: TVS Jupiter, TVS Scooty Zest

The TVS Wego is a scooter manufactured by TVS Motor Company introduced in 2010. It is a unisex, dual usage, 110cc moto-scooter. After releasing several variants of the TVS Scooty, the company entered the higher-end segment of the scooterette market by introducing the Wego.

== Product ==
The TVS Wego is powered by a 109.7cc CVT-i high torque and a variometer transmission for providing power on demand. The company claims to deliver a 62 km/L (1.6 L/100 km; 150 mpg_{‑US}) mileage. It has a low friction design, moly coat piston, and low friction engine oil.

The Wego has a stainless steel muffler guard, a full digital speedometer, body-coloured grab fails, blacked-out alloy wheels, and two-tone colours.

The TVS Wego has a full metallic body for more sturdiness and included storage space.

The scooter is designed to package 12-inch wheels, a low seat height for easy ground reach, external fuel fill, and under seat storage.

It is equipped with a fully digital instrument console which includes a trip meter and gives the rider service reminders, low fuel, and low battery indicators.

It has a telescopic suspension and gas filled rear shock absorbers and a patented easy center stand.

Other features include a dual side handle lock for ease in parking, a kick start mechanism that makes it possible to start the scooter while sitting, a luminous ignition key for better visibility, and tubeless tyres.

The TVS Wego has body balance technology. Body balance technology works on combining an ergonomic design with an engine placement that ensures an optimum center of gravity. This in turn improves maneuverability and stability, helping the user to handle varying road conditions.

The scooter features the Sync Braking technology, a system which integrates the front and rear brakes when brake pressure to either is applied. It also has multi-refractor headlamps and an optional disc brake.

The TVS Wego comes in 10 colors: Metallic orange, Metallic T-Grey, Volcanic Red, Deep Sky Blue, Midnight Black, Sporty White, Dual Tone : Orange + Black, Red + Black, Blue + Black

=== Developments ===
The company introduced a BS IV compliant version in 2017. The updated version was also fitted with a USB charging port, silver oak panels, and a dual toned seat. It was launched in two new colors: Metallic orange and T-grey. Due to high consumer demand of the TVS Jupiter in India, the TVS Wego has since been discontinued in the Indian market, but continues to be supplied to overseas markets.

== Awards ==
The TVS Wego has won four Scooter of the Year awards in 2011: CNBC TV18 Overdrive, Business Standard Motoring, NDTV Car and Bike, and Bike India. It is also the recipient of India Design Mark in 2014.

The TVS Wego won the award for India's Best Executive Scooter from J.D. Power two years in a row in 2015 and 2016.
