= Honda de México =

Automobile manufacturer

Honda de México, S.A. de C.V.
- Type: Subsidiary
- Industry: Automotive
- Founded: 1985; 41 years ago
- Headquarters: El Salto, Jalisco, Mexico
- Area served: North America
- Parent: Honda Motor Co., Ltd.
- Divisions: Acura
- Website: www.honda.mx

Honda de México S.A. de C.V. is a subsidiary of the Japanese company Honda founded in September 1985 and headquartered in El Salto, Jalisco, Mexico.

== Plants ==
=== El Salto ===
The main plant in El Salto covers an area of 2.7 million square meters. Around 260 million US dollars were raised in 1986 for the construction of the plant and production started in 1988. The CBR100 rolled off the assembly line as the company's first product. Around 1,000 workers were employed at that time. The maximum production capacity was 50,000 units per year.

In 1984, construction work began to expand the factory. In the new department, production of the fifth generation Accord began in 1995. This increased the annual capacity to 200,000 units. The number of employees also increased to around 2,800 employees. Production of the sixth generation started two years later in 1997. In the summer of 1999, the company began exporting its products. In June 2002, the factory began production of the C100 Biz. In the same year, the seventh generation of the Accord came onto the market, but assembly in Mexico did not start until 2004.

With the start of production of the new Beat 100 in February 2004, the Accord was exported to Argentina. Since December, vehicle components and spare parts for the Acura RL have also been manufactured. When the production of the Accord ended in 2007, it was eventually replaced by the third generation CR-V. The fourth generation of the CR-V began production in El Salto in January 2012.

=== Guadalajara ===
In Guadalajara, the company opened a second plant parallel to the main plant and production began in 1988. The CH80 was built in the second plant, which was replaced by the Activa in April 2004. By July 2005, the C90 was also manufactured. Due to low demand, Honda closed the plant in 2009.

=== Celaya ===
Another plant of the manufacturer began construction in autumn 2011. According to previous information, production of the Fit was to start at the Celaya site in the state of Guanajuato. An investment of 800 million US dollars was planned for the construction of the plant. Up to 3,200 workers were to be employed on the 5.66 million square meter site. The maximum annual capacity of the plant is set at 200,000 units.
