= Suzuki Motorcycle India =

Indian subsidiary of Japanese company

Suzuki Motorcycle India Private Limited
- Type: Private
- Industry: Automotive
- Founded: 2006
- Headquarters: Gurgaon, Haryana, India
- Key people: Satoshi Uchida - Managing Director
- Products: Motorcycles, scooters, sports bikes
- Number of employees: 490 (as on 2013)
- Parent: Suzuki Motor Corporation
- Website: SMI

Suzuki Motorcycle India, Private Limited (SMI) is the wholly owned Indian subsidiary of Suzuki, Japan. It was the third Suzuki automotive venture in India, after TVS Suzuki (1982–2001) and Maruti Suzuki (1982). In 1982, the joint-venture between Suzuki Motor Corporation and TVS Motor Company incorporated and started production of two wheelers in India. In 2001, after separating ways with TVS motor company, the company was re-entered as Suzuki Motorcycle India, Private Limited (SMI), in 2006. The company has set up a manufacturing facility at Gurgaon, Haryana with an annual capacity of 540,000 units.

== Vehicles ==
=== Motorcycles ===
- Gixxer 155
- Gixxer SF 155
- Gixxer 250
- Gixxer SF 250
- V-Strom 250 SX
- V-Strom 800 DE

=== Scooters ===
- Access 125 (Sold as the Address 125 in Europe)
- Burgman Street
- Avenis 125

=== Sports bikes ===
- Hayabusa GSX 1300R
- GSX-8R

=== ATVs ===
- Ozark 250
- Quadsport Z400

== Discontinued ==
=== Scooters ===
- Suzuki Swish
- Suzuki Let's

=== Motorcycles/sports bikes ===
- Suzuki GS150R
- Suzuki Intruder 155
- Suzuki Hayate 110
- Suzuki Heat 125
- Suzuki Inazuma 250
- Suzuki Slingshot 125
- Suzuki Slingshot Plus 125
- Suzuki Zeus 125
- GSX-S1000F ABS
- GSX-R1000 ABS
- GSX-R1000R ABS
- GSX-S1000 ABS
- Intruder M1800R
- Intruder M1800R BOSS Edition
- V-Strom-1000 ABS
- V-Strom 650 XT
- Katana
