= Sulajja Firodia Motwani =

Indian entrepreneur (born 1970)

- Born: Sulajja Firodia; 26 August 1970 (age 56)
- Education: MBA
- Alma mater: Carnegie Mellon University
- Occupations: Businesswomann, Board Advisor AIESEC, Pune
- Employer(s): Kinetic Engineering Limited (vice-chair); Kinetic Green Energy & Power Solutions Limited (founder, CEO)
- Spouse: Manish Motwani
- Father: Arun Firodia
- Relatives: H. K. Firodia (grandfather)

Sulajja Firodia Motwani (born 26 August 1970) is an Indian entrepreneur. She is currently the vice-chairperson of Kinetic Engineering Limited and is the founder and CEO of Kinetic Green Energy & Power Solutions Limited.

The Kinetic Group witnessed expansion during her term, offering a range of two wheelers right from mopeds, scooters to motorcycles. She has recently restructured the group to expand group activities into automotive systems and green energy. Most notably, she has founded a company, Kinetic Green Energy and Power Solutions, that aims to launch electric autos, buggies and small electric taxis.

== Early life ==
Sulajja was born on 26 August 1970. She completed her graduation in Commerce from Brihan Maharashtra College of Commerce, Pune University in 1990. She is an MBA holder from Carnegie Mellon University in Pittsburgh. She is the granddaughter of H. K. Firodia, founder of Kinetic Engineering and the daughter of Arun Firodia, founder and present Chairman of the Arun Firodia Group (Not affiliated with the Dr. Abhay Firodia Group - Force Motors, Jaya Hind Industries) . Throughout her studies, she has been a rank holder. Her name appeared in the toppers list in the SSC examinations and she topped the state in HSC examinations. She was a vice-president for a youth run organization, AIESEC in Pune for which she is currently a board advisor.

== Personal life ==
Sulajja is married to Manish Motwani and is the mother to a 19-year-old son, Sidhant. She is a fitness enthusiast and a marathon runner. She has been enthusiastic about sports especially badminton. She is also fond of pursuing adventurous sports like skiing, sky diving and scuba diving.

== Career ==
She recently formed a JV with Tonino Lamborghini, SpA, to bring global design and technology for electric and solar golf carts and tourism vehicles, which will be manufactured in India and marketed globally.

She is also the Vice Chairperson of Kinetic Engineering Ltd. She is responsible for Kinetic group's overall business strategy and development. Kinetic Group's business interests include Automobile Manufacturing, auto components including Powertrain Systems, Green Energy, Multilevel parking solutions, Elevators & Escalators. Kinetic's partners include companies like Hyundai, Lamborghini, Taigene Electrical, Magna etc.

Before joining Kinetic Motor Company, she worked for a period of four years with an investment analytics company, BARRA International, based in California. She played a major role in setting the operations of the Kinetic Motor Company in India. Sulajja played a major role in designing and implementing new strategies for the company. She is also performing the role of the Director of Kinetic Motor Company and Kinetic Green Energy limited. She is in charge of the Group's overall business developmental activities.
