= Arun Firodia =

Indian businessman

- Education: IIT Bombay; Massachusetts Institute of Technology; Sloan School of Management
- Spouse: Dr. Jayshree Firodia
- Children: 4, including Sulajja Firodia Motwani
- Father: H. K. Firodia
- Awards: Padma Shri (2012)

Arun Firodia (born 1943) is an Indian industrialist, social activist and philanthropist. He is the chairman of Kinetic Group, manufacturer of India's first indigenous moped. Kinetic Group is an OEM (Original Equipment Manufacturer) and produces forging, gears, shafts, gear boxes, rigid axles for EVs and chassis, catering to global and domestic automotive industry, and are a leading manufacturer and exporter of two wheelers. In 2022, Business Standard ranked him 12th amongst the 20 doyens who shaped India's business.

Arun is the founder and chairman of the H.K. Firodia Memorial Foundation. Established in 1996, in memory of his father, the awards honoured exceptional Indian scientists for their contribution with H.K. Firodia Awards for Excellence in Science & Technology. During 25 years, many eminent scientists received awards, of whom Dr. APJ Abdul Kalam was the first recipient of the award.

== Early Life & Education ==
Arun Firodia did his early schooling from MES Bal Shikshan Mandir, Pune and then from Modern High School, Pune. He obtained his B.Tech with distinction in Electrical Engineering from IIT Bombay in 1965. He is also an alumnus of MIT (Massachusetts Institute of Technology) where he obtained his M.S. in Electrical Engineering from MIT in 1997 and his M.S. in Management in 1968 from Sloan School of Management.

Arun Firodia is a recipient of the Padma Shri, the fourth highest civilian award of India, in 2012. In 2023, Dr. D.Y. Patil Vidyapeeth, Pune conferred Arun with Doctor of Science (Honoris Causa).

== Industry Associations ==
- Chairman, H.K. Firodia Memorial Foundation - 1996 onwards
- Founder President, Pune Citizens Police Foundation - 2001 onwards
- President, Mahratta Chamber of Commerce, Industry & Agriculture (MCCIA) - 2000-2002
- Trustee, Janwani, Pune (Sustainability focussed NGO)
- Member, High Powered Committee, National Aerospace Labs - 2010-2012
- Chairman, Research Council of CSIR-CSIO, Chandigarh - 2010-2017
- Chair Professorship, IIT Bombay - 2024 onwards
- Chair Mentorship at Defence Institute of Advance Technology (DIAT), Pune - 2025 onwards

== Awards & Recognitions ==
Year	Award	Body
2005	Indian Automotive Hall of Pride Award for lifetime contribution to the Indian automotive industry	Jointly by SIAM, ACMA, ICICI and Overdrive
2007	Alumnus Award for exceptional service to the country, society and MIT	Massachusetts Institute of Technology
2008	Distinguished Alumnus Award	Indian Institute of Technology Bombay
2012	Padma Shri	Government of India
2023	Honorary Doctor of Science (Honoris Causa)	Dr. D.Y. Patil Vidyapeeth

== Personal Life ==
Arun Firodia was born in 1943 to the late freedom fighter Pankunwar Firodia and late industrialist H.K. Firodia, founder of Kinetic Engineering Limited. He is married to Dr. Jayshree Firodia who is a pediatrician. They have three daughters, Kimaya, Sulajja, and Vismaya, and one son, Ajinkya.
