= Electric car charging methods =

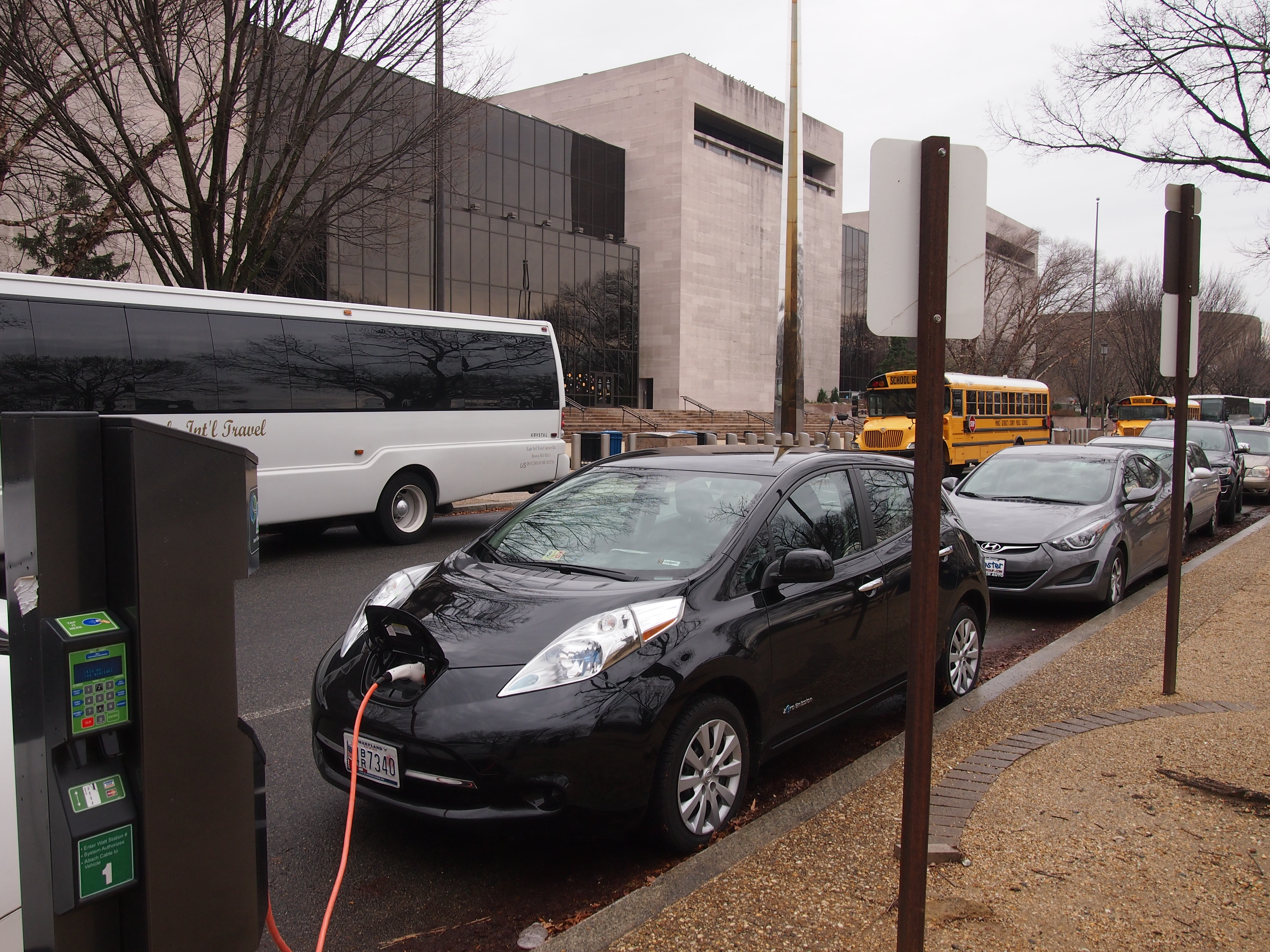
Electric car charging at National Air and Space Museum, 12 December 2016.

Various methods exist for recharging the batteries of electric cars. Currently, the largest concern surrounding electric vehicle transportation is the total travel range available before the need to recharge. The longest range recorded to date was 606.2 miles, achieved by a Tesla Model 3. However, this was conducted in very controlled conditions where the car maintained a constant speed without the added drain of the air conditioning compressor. Typically, the battery would last for approximately 300 miles - the equivalent to three days of city commuting in warmer weather, or one day in colder weather. With these limitations, long-distance trips are currently unsuited for an electric car unless rapid charging stations are available on the route of the trip.

== Principles of rapid charging ==
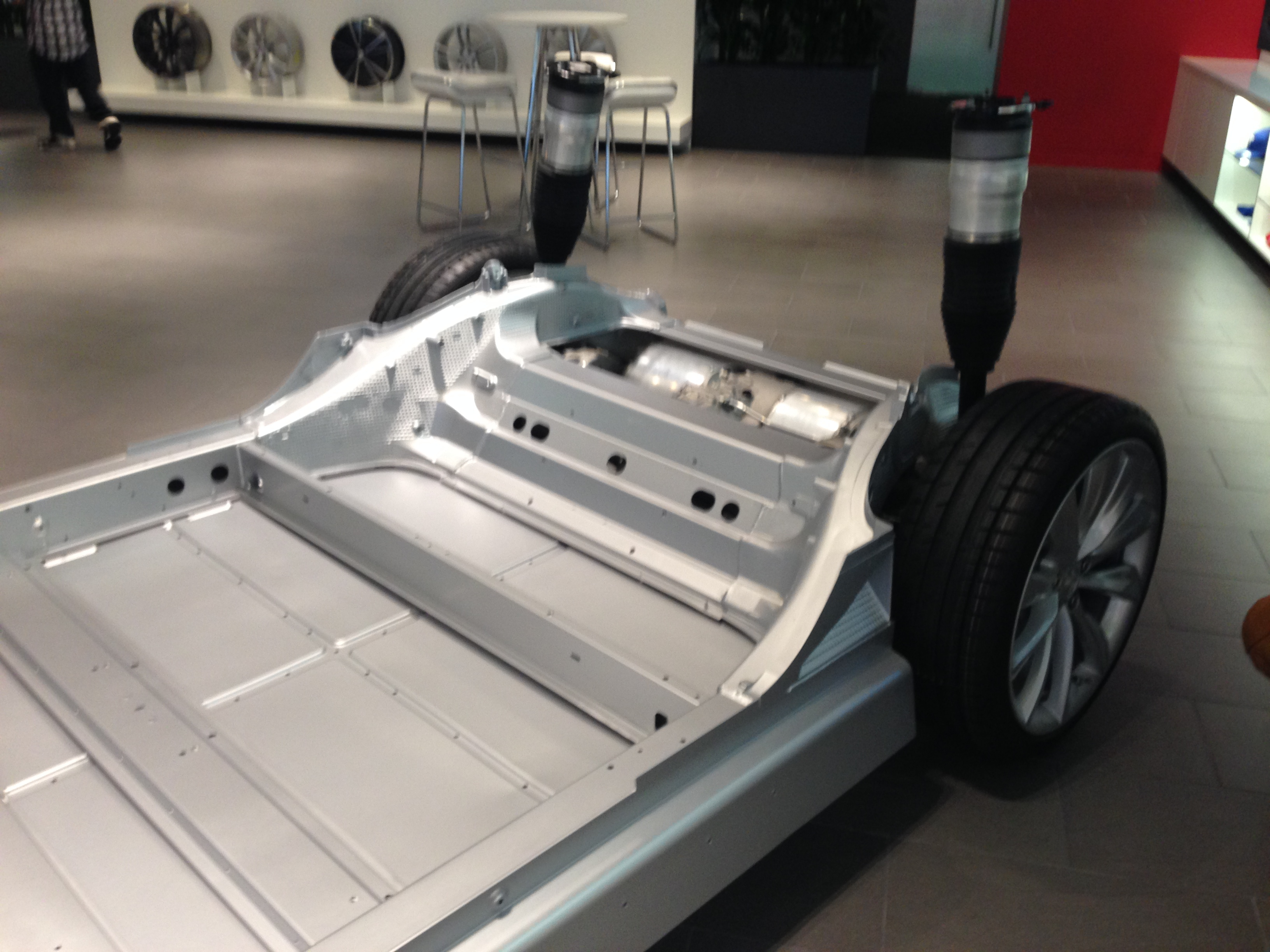
Chassis of a Tesla Model S, exposing battery pack area

The process of discharging involves lithium ions from a positive electrode passing through a separator/electrolyte. The ions then transfer, via a solid electrolyte interface (SEI) and intercalate, into the negative electrode. The potential negative impact for rapid charging is that battery aging may be accelerated by the unstable SEI, produced by charging and discharging multiple times.

New pulse charging has significantly improved the stability of SEI since the unnecessary chemical reaction has been reduced by new charging methods and SEI is grown via a reduction reaction. Thus, a battery's life cycle and efficiency has also improved in comparison to the traditional charging method. Also, in traditional charging method, ethylene might be produced during charging due to electrolyte (EC, mostly) reduction with lithium ions. Since the battery is closed, the internal pressure is contained. The produced ethylene will lead to overpressure inside the battery. Overpressure of the battery may also cause the battery to expand due to an internal temperature rise, potentially causing the battery to explode. By using these new composite waveform charging method, however, it can reduce the produced ethylene by suppressing the electrolyte reduction reaction. Therefore, giving a moderate energy for lithium ions to transfer during charging and a quick negative pulse to reduce unwanted chemical reactions, it seems to be a theoretical charging method in the future.

== Charging algorithms ==
The different algorithms vary in charging efficiency, charging time, battery life cycles, and costs. However, researchers still cannot define which is the most appropriate one for the application, as many algorithms have been developed; each one has advantages and disadvantages. For instance, the constant current-constant voltage charging method has a longer charging time compared to the multistage current charging algorithm, while the cost of research on the latter is higher than the former. Considering the pros and cons of each algorithm, the goal is to match each one with its appropriate application.

=== Constant current ===
The constant current charging method adjusts the output voltage of charging devices or the resistance in series with the battery to keep the current constant. It uses a constant current value form the beginning to the end of charging. As nickel-cadmium batteries are easy to polarize during conventional charging, the electrolyte continuously produces hydrogen-oxygen gas in both conventional constant voltage and constant current charging algorithms. Under the action of internal high pressure, the oxygen penetrates to the negative electrode and interacts with the cadmium plate to generate CdO, resulting in the decrease of effective capacity of the electrode plate. As the acceptable current capacity of the battery decreases gradually with the progress of the charging process, this led to the overcharging of the battery in the later charging period. Eventually, it will also lead to a sharp drop in battery capacity.

=== Constant voltage ===
Constant voltage charging is a widely used charging method involving constant voltage between the battery poles. The starter battery uses constant voltage charging when the vehicle is running. If the specified voltage constant value is appropriate, it can ensure that the battery is fully charged, while also minimizing gas and water loss.

=== Variation of constant current/constant voltage charging algorithms ===
The boost charger CC/CV charging algorithm is a further development of the constant current/constant voltage algorithms. Instead of using the constant voltage and current in the entire charging period, it boosts the charging efficiency through maximizing voltage in the first period, with the battery reaching approximately 30% of its nominal charging capacity. After this period, the charging algorithm is then switched to the standard CC/CV. Due to the initial higher charging voltage, the BC-CC/CV can charge the battery faster than the CC/CV, but it is required to fully discharge the battery before charging. As the charger needs to provide variable voltage, all components need to accept the highest voltage generated by the boost charger. Discharging the battery before recharging is important as this will influence the efficiency charging algorithm and the life cycle of batteries.

=== Multistage current charging algorithm ===
Multistage current charging divides the entire charging period into several charging stages that attempt to use the optimal charging current across each stage, maximize the charging efficiency. By determining the optimal charging current for each stage, the fuzzy controller is used to determine the charging current by the change in temperature. To sum up, this algorithm is based on a micro-controller or a computer. The charging speed is faster and charging efficiency is higher than those of the CC/CV.

== Non-contact charging method ==
Wireless charging

Non-contact charging utilizes magnetic resonance to transfer energy in the air between the charger and battery. This achieves a highly efficient energy transformation. As the non-contact charger could keeping charging the vehicle, it allows EVs to have a smaller battery. By itself, it is more economical, safer and more sustainably developed. Since the battery is the major contributor to the cost of an EV, the MSRP of an EV is lowered as a result of the use of non-contact charging. However, developing a non-contact charging system involves huge financial support. For example, to realize real-time charging on the road, it requires installation of receiver coil under the car and reconstruct the road and put transmitter coil under the power supply track. In this way, it allows car to be automatically charged while operating on the road. Due to this, many EV manufacturers are using traditional charging methods to keep costs low. Since non-contact charging systems rely on the electromagnetic field as their mechanism of action, electronic devices in close proximity to the charger may be negatively affected during charging. There is also the possibility that animals may be influenced. Efficiency is another concern for researchers.

== Battery swap ==
Battery swapping involves the use of an automatic or semi-automatic system to exchange a depleted battery with a fully charged one. This process can only be completed by technical personnel. The process is meant to achieve a comparable refueling time to a traditional gasoline vehicle, with swaps typically completed in roughly 3 minutes. In China, company like NIO have built more than 1151 battery swap stations to help popularize this technology.
