= TVS Scooty =

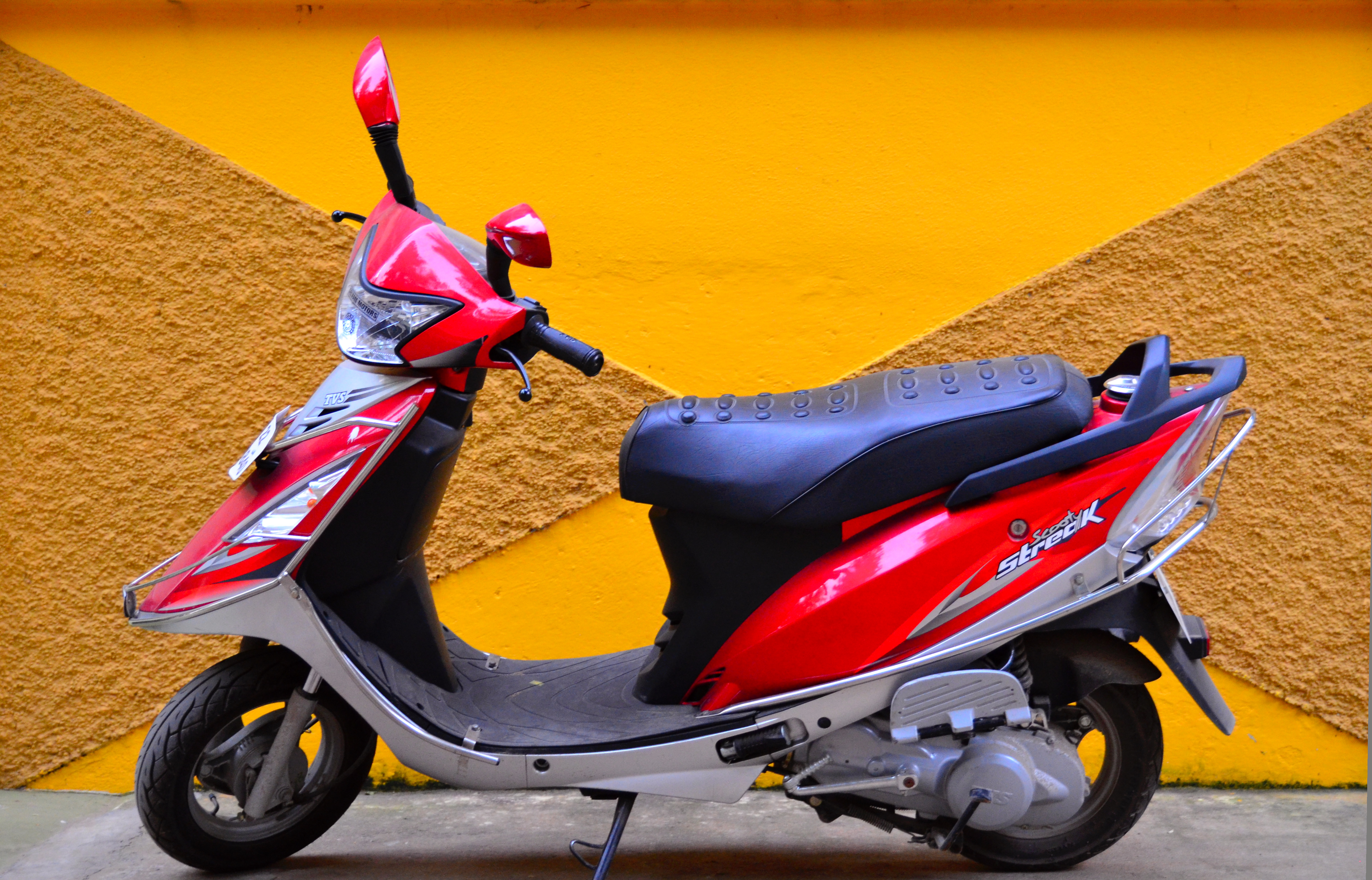
- TVS Scooty Streak
- Manufacturer: TVS Motor Company
- Production: 1996–Present
- Assembly: Hosur, India
- Class: Scooter

The TVS Scooty is a brand of Scooters made by TVS Motor Company of India. It is marketed mainly to women, and in 2009 was the largest selling brand among scooters aimed specifically at women buyers, selling about 25,000 units per month, compared to about 60,000 per month for the overall top selling scooter in India.

== History ==
Scooty was initially conceived of as a Scooter for both sexes. However sales figures over the first two years indicated that more women were buying the Scooty than men. In 1996, Scooty went through a repositioning exercise to target women. Though it was seen as a risk with the large majority of Indian two-wheeler riders being male, TVS chose the strategy to tap the nascent segment of women riders. Over the last decade, Scooty has launched several models that cater to different segments of the market. These include the Scooty ES 60cc (1996 - Self & Kick start), the Scooty Pep 75cc (2003 - Self & Kick start) and Pep+ 90cc (2005 - Self & Kick start), Scooty Teenz 60cc (2007 - Self & Kick start), Scooty Streak 90cc (2009 - Self & Kick start) and Scooty Zest 110cc (2014 - Self & Kick start).

== Marketing ==
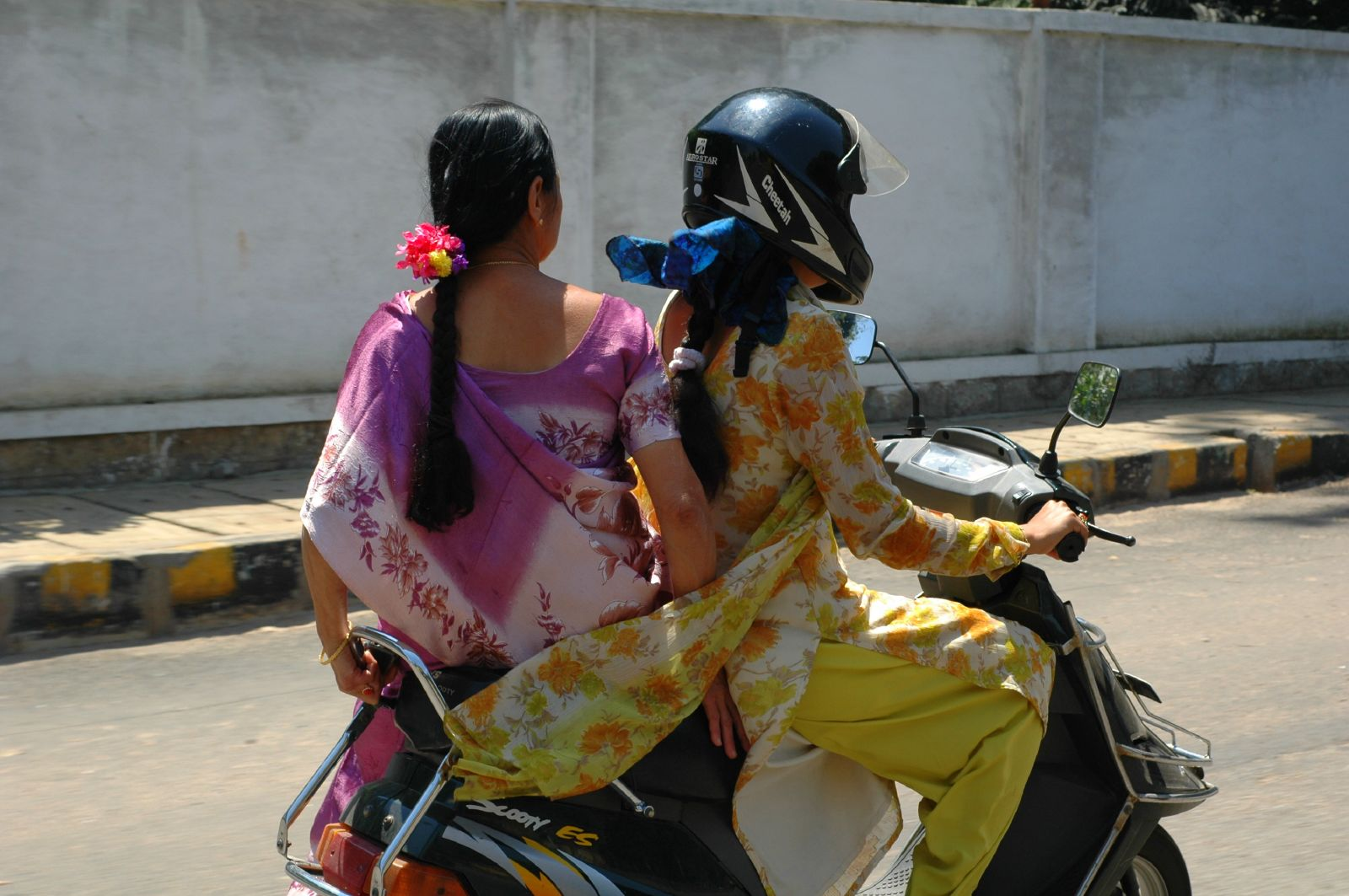
Riders in Bangalore, India

=== Rider education ===
In 2009 TVS Scooty began providing two-wheeler riding training to women across small and large towns in India in an effort to increase the size of the target market. Fewer than 2% of Indian women in the potential two-wheeler buying category of 15- to 60-year-olds actually buy a scooter. The campaign was called Women on Wheels: Building the Riding Habit, and later renamed the TVS Scooty Institute. The program has had 80 locations, and 42,000 women have been trained to ride a two-wheeler. About 20% of women trained at the institute buy the TVS Scooty. This campaign won the EMVIE by the Ad Club Bombay for campaign innovation.

=== Product placement in Indian entertainment ===
The TVS Scooty range has benefited from product placement in Bollywood movies and Indian TV Serials, as either a prop, or in certain cases part of the plot. In the 2008 film Ghajini starring Aamir Khan, lead actress Asin Thottumkal rides the TVS Scooty Pep+ to get around in the role of Kalpana. It has appeared in the films Chance Pe Dance starring Genelia D'Souza, and in Sunday starring Ayesha Takia. Ranbir Kapoor in the lead role of the 2009 release Rocket Singh: Salesman of the Year rather unwillingly has to ride the a bright pink Scooty Pep+, bought lovingly for him by his father, played by Prem Chopra. The Scooty becomes central to the plot as much of the time Ranbir's character Harpreet Singh spends on the road is on this scooter.

=== MTV Scooty Teen Diva initiative ===
TVS Scooty supported the MTV Scooty Teen Diva reality television contest in which contestants were judged on a variety of skills and attributes. The 2009 edition had over 3,000 applicants, 11 of whom participated in a 15-day shoot on location which was televised into an eight-episode reality series on MTV India in July–August 2009. Featuring judges who were members of the Indian fashion industry, contestants were graded on skills such as ramp-walking, cheerleading, acting and creativity. The winner of the 2008 edition was Koyal Rana and of the 2009 edition was Apeksha Porwal. They have both competed as India's representative at the Miss Teen International beauty pageant in July 2009 and 2010 in Chicago, United States. The association with a youth-oriented TV series is believed to reinforce Scooty's position in the minds of the target consumer.

== Models ==
=== Scooty Streak ===
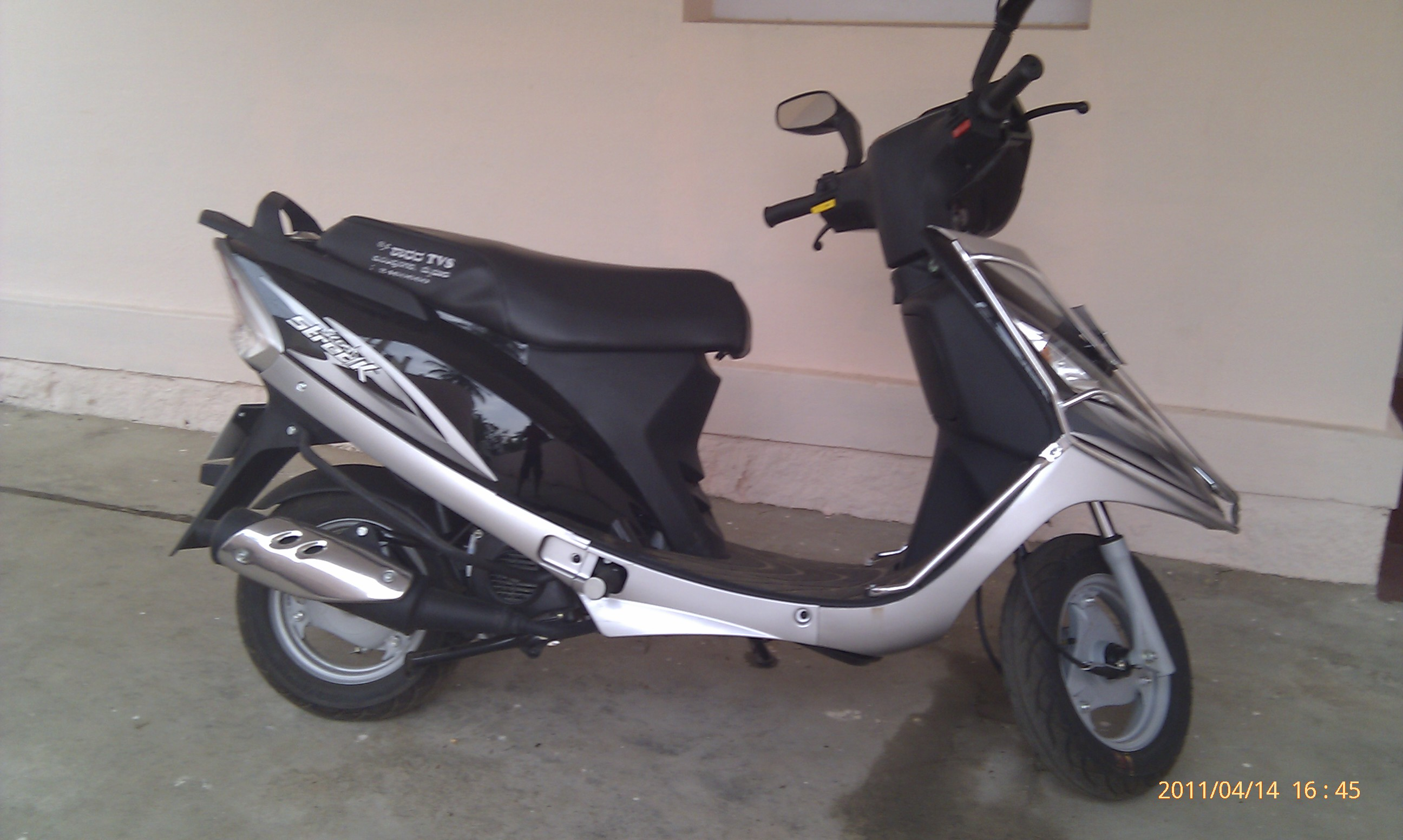
Scooty Streak

Launched in March 2009, the TVS Scooty Streak features LED tail lamps, external fuel filling and an easy-to-use center stand: making it specifically designed for young women. It has 90mm wide anti-skid tyres fashioned from wet compound giving it stronger grip in wet weather driving.

=== Scooty Pep and Pep+ ===
Launched in 2005 Scooty Pep Plus features a light-weight body, with a choice of 99 colours and easy to drive.

=== Scooty Teenz and Teenz Electric ===
The Scooty Teenz was launched in 2007 has also been released in the electric edition that is designed specifically for young women who travel short distances. The Teenz Electric can carry a load of 130 kg with a pillion rider, up to a distance of 40 km (25 mi) per charge. The Scooty Teenz also has a mobile charger as part of its features.

=== Scooty Zest ===
Launched in 2014 the TVS Scooty Zest comes with a 110.9 cc engine which gives a power output of 8.7 HP and a torque output of 8.8 Nm. It has an electronic fuel injection system. The scooter also has CVT transmission, dual seat, LED taillight, foldable footrest and alloy wheels.

== See also ==
- TVS Jupiter
- TVS Ntorq 125
