= Honda Activa =

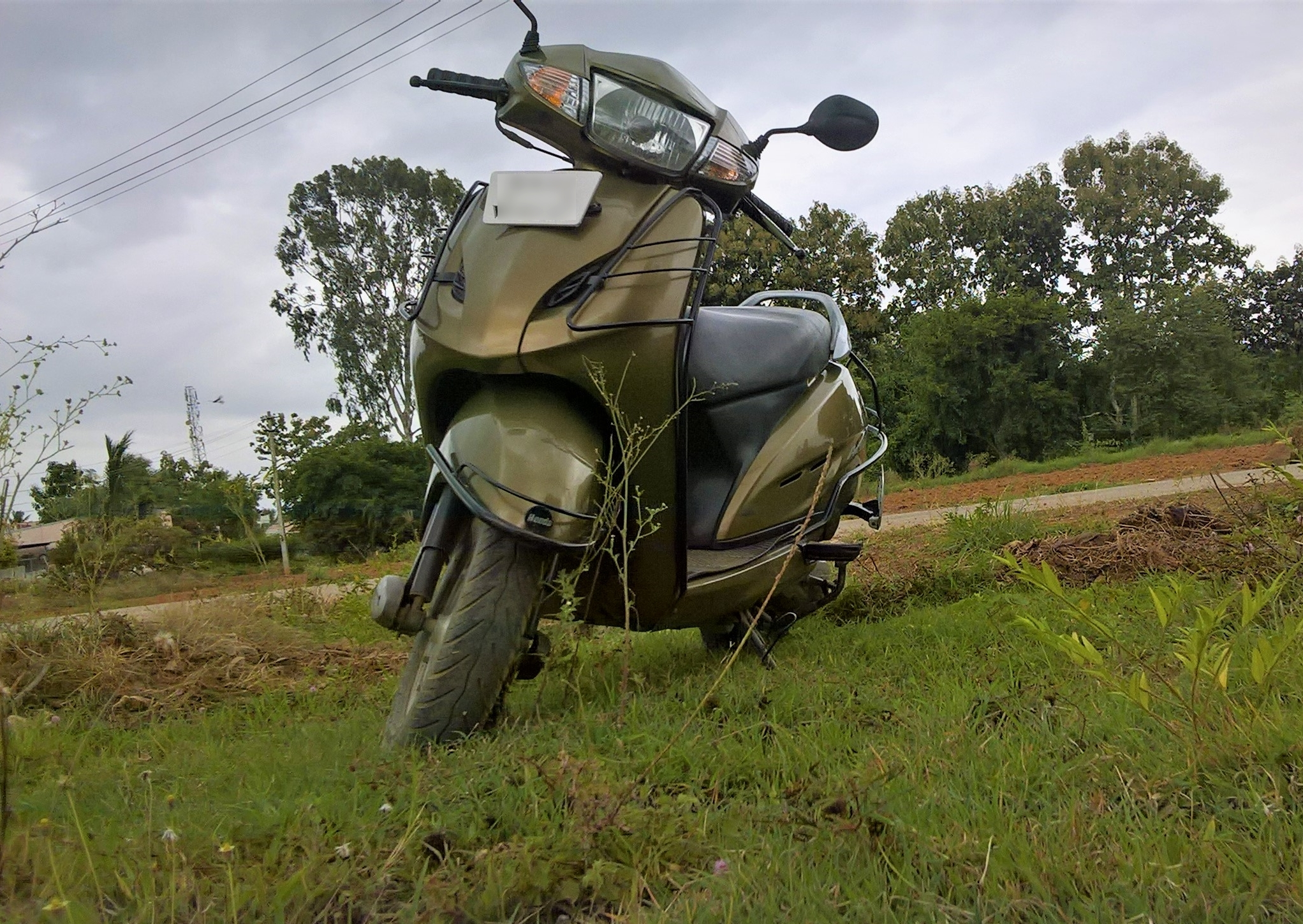
- Manufacturer: Honda Motorcycle and Scooter India; Honda de México
- Also called: Activa; Activa e: (electric)
- Production: 2001–Present
- Successor: Activa 125 (125 cc line)
- Class: Motor scooter (step-through, automatic)
- Engine: 100 cc (6.1 cu in) (2001–2008); 109 cc (6.7 cu in) / 110 cc (6.7 cu in) (from 2009); 125 cc (7.6 cu in) (Activa 125 line)
- Power: 5.88 kW @ 8,000 rpm (109.51 cc, current spec)
- Torque: 9.05 Nm @ 5,500 rpm (109.51 cc, current spec)
- Transmission: CVT
- Suspension: (Model year / generation dependent)
- Brakes: (Model year / generation dependent; CBS introduced in 2009 update)
- Tires: (Tube-type on early models; later models include tubeless tyres depending on variant/year)

Exhaust sound of a Honda Activa

The Honda Activa is a motor scooter manufactured by Honda Motorcycle and Scooter India (HMSI). The Activa was introduced in India in 2001 as Honda’s first two-wheeler model for the country. It is a step-through scooter with an automatic CVT drivetrain, sold primarily in 200 cc-class and also as a 125 cc derivative (Activa 125 line).

== History ==
Honda introduced the Activa in India in 2001 as a 100 cc scooter positioned for mass-market use. In April 2009, Honda announced a major update with a new 110 cc engine and feature upgrades (including CBS on select variants). Over time, the model line evolved through multiple generations, with updates to emissions compliance, convenience features, and ride hardware.

== Generations ==
=== First generation (2001–2008) ===
The first-generation Activa launched in 2001 with a 100 cc engine and CVT automatic transmission. Early models were positioned around durability and everyday usability, and Honda promoted features such as a strengthened inner tube (“tuff-up tube”) on the initial product line.

=== Second generation (2009–2014) ===
Honda’s 2009 update introduced a new 110 cc-class engine and brought feature upgrades including CBS (Combi Brake) on select variants. This generation also saw incremental improvements in refinement and running changes through the early 2010s.

Note: The Activa-i (introduced in 2013) was marketed as a lighter, more affordable model line alongside the Activa, rather than a numbered “generation” of the Activa itself.

=== Third generation (2015–2016) ===
The Activa 3G was introduced in 2015 as the next major refresh for the Activa line, with styling and feature updates while retaining the core 110 cc-class positioning.

=== Fourth generation (2017–2018) ===
The Activa 4G arrived in 2017 with a BS-IV compliant engine and updates such as AHO and convenience features (such as a mobile charging option on certain variants).

=== Fifth generation (2018–2020) ===
The Activa 5G was launched in 2018 with updates including an LED headlamp and feature revisions, while continuing the BS-IV-era mechanical package.

=== Sixth generation (2020–present) ===
The Activa 6G was introduced as the BS-VI generation and added major hardware changes such as a fuel-injection system (PGM-FI) and telescopic front suspension (depending on variant/market configuration). Honda’s later product updates continue to revise the 109.51 cc platform for compliance and features.

== Milestones ==
In April 2014, The Economic Times reported the Honda Activa as the best-selling two-wheeler in India, outselling the Hero Splendor.

In November 2018, HMSI crossed the 2.5 crore sales mark in its scooter segment, and Honda stated that the Activa was the largest contributor to this milestone.

It took Honda 13 years to achieve the one-crore sales figure, but it managed to add another crore in the span of just three years. It then went on to achieve the next 50 lakh in just one year. Honda stated that it held 57 percent of the Indian scooter market share at the time, and that every second scooter sold in India was one of its own.

== Special editions ==
=== 20th Anniversary Edition ===
In November 2020, HMSI introduced the Activa 6G 20th Anniversary Edition to commemorate 20 years of the Activa in India. The special edition featured cosmetic updates such as anniversary badging/graphics and a unique colour scheme, while remaining mechanically unchanged from the standard Activa 6G.

=== Premium Edition ===
In August 2022, Honda launched the Activa Premium Edition in India. The Premium Edition primarily added cosmetic enhancements (such as new paint options and premium detailing) and was positioned above the standard variants, while retaining the same mechanical package.

=== Limited Edition ===
In May 2019, HMSI introduced the Activa 5G Limited Edition in India. The limited-run variant primarily added cosmetic updates such as new dual-tone colour schemes, revised graphics and styling details, while remaining mechanically unchanged from the standard Activa 5G.

In September 2023, HMSI launched an Activa 6G Limited Edition in India, again focused on cosmetic changes (new decals/graphics) and offered in select variants, with no mechanical changes reported.

== Variants and updates ==
=== Variants ===
The Activa 110 is sold in multiple variants in India, typically including STD, DLX and a higher-spec H-Smart trim (availability varies by model year and market).

=== H-Smart technology ===
Honda introduced H-Smart as a premium trim featuring a Honda Smart Key (keyless operation) and related convenience/security functions (such as remote unlocking for storage/fuel access). The H-Smart variant also introduced additional equipment such as alloy wheels compared to lower trims on certain model years.

=== 2025 update (OBD2B and connected features) ===
In January 2025, HMSI updated the Activa 110 to comply with OBD2B requirements and added new convenience and connected features. The update introduced a 4.2-inch TFT display with Bluetooth connectivity compatible with the Honda RoadSync smartphone application (navigation and call/message alerts), a USB Type-C charging port, and an idling stop system, with some features limited to higher variants depending on configuration.

== Awards ==
=== 2001 ===
Scooter of the Year 2001 (BS Motoring)

=== 2002 ===
Scooter of the Year by Overdrive Magazine

=== 2007 ===
Best automobile brand of India 2007 (Planman Media)

=== 2008 ===
Scooter Customers Satisfaction No.1 - CNBC TV18 - Auto Car "Auto Awards 2008

=== 2009 ===
Scooter of the Year - ET ZigWheels Awards 2009

=== 2018 ===
- DROOM – Buyer's Choice Scooter Of The Year
- DROOM – Dealer's Choice Scooter of the Year
- DROOM – Jury's Choice Scooter of the Year
- Most sold scooter on Droom

=== 2019 ===
- Jury's Choice Pre-Owned Scooter of the Year (Droom Pre-Owned Auto awards)
- Buyer's Choice Pre-Owned Scooter of the Year (Droom Pre-Owned Auto awards)

=== 2020 ===
- Scooter of the Year (Jagran HiTech Awards) (Activa 6G)

=== 2021 ===
- Best Innovation and Integrated Campaign - 2 Wheeler (CarAndBike Awards, 2021) (Activa 6G)

== Gallery ==
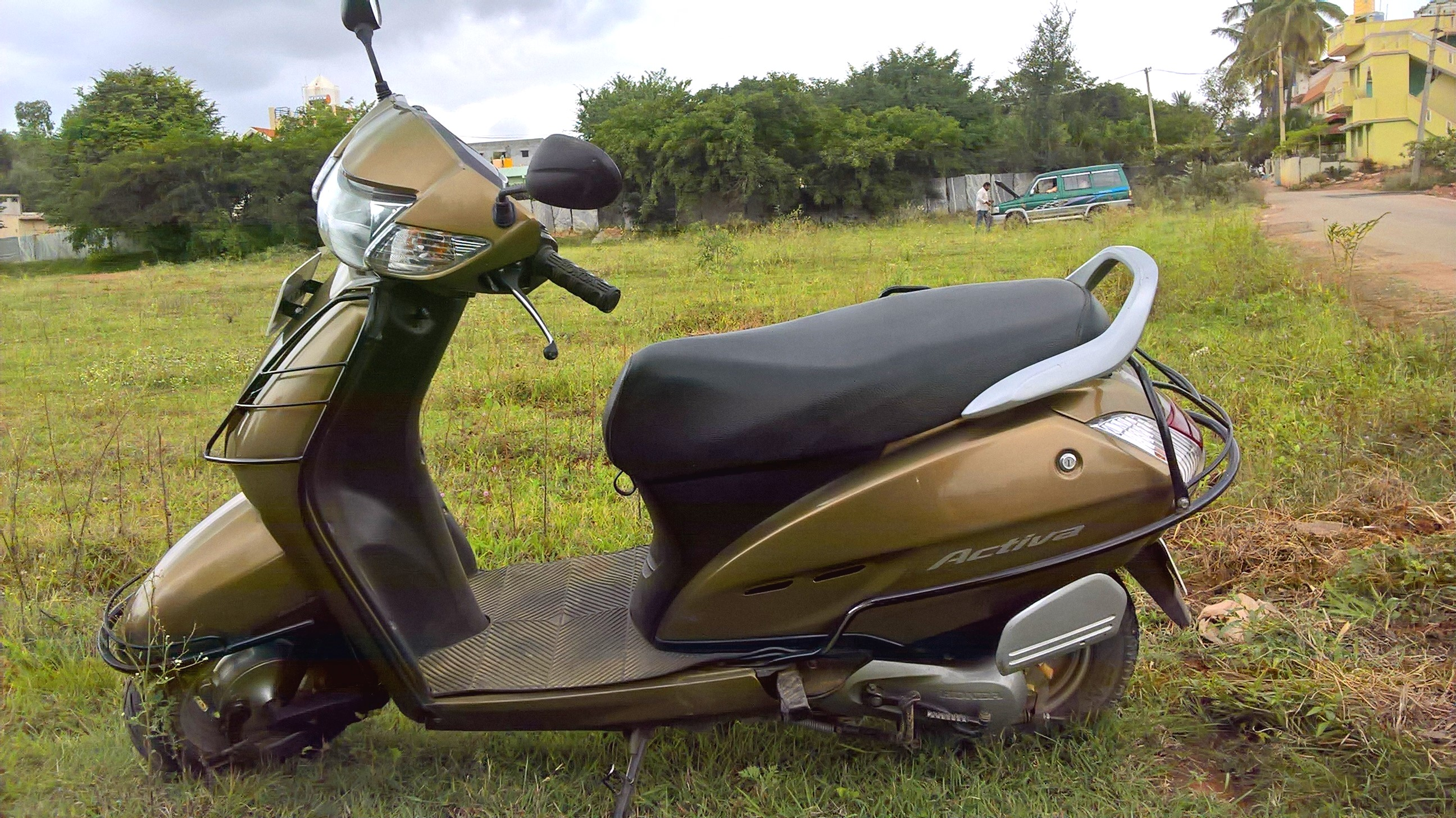
Honda Activa Armour Gold Metallic

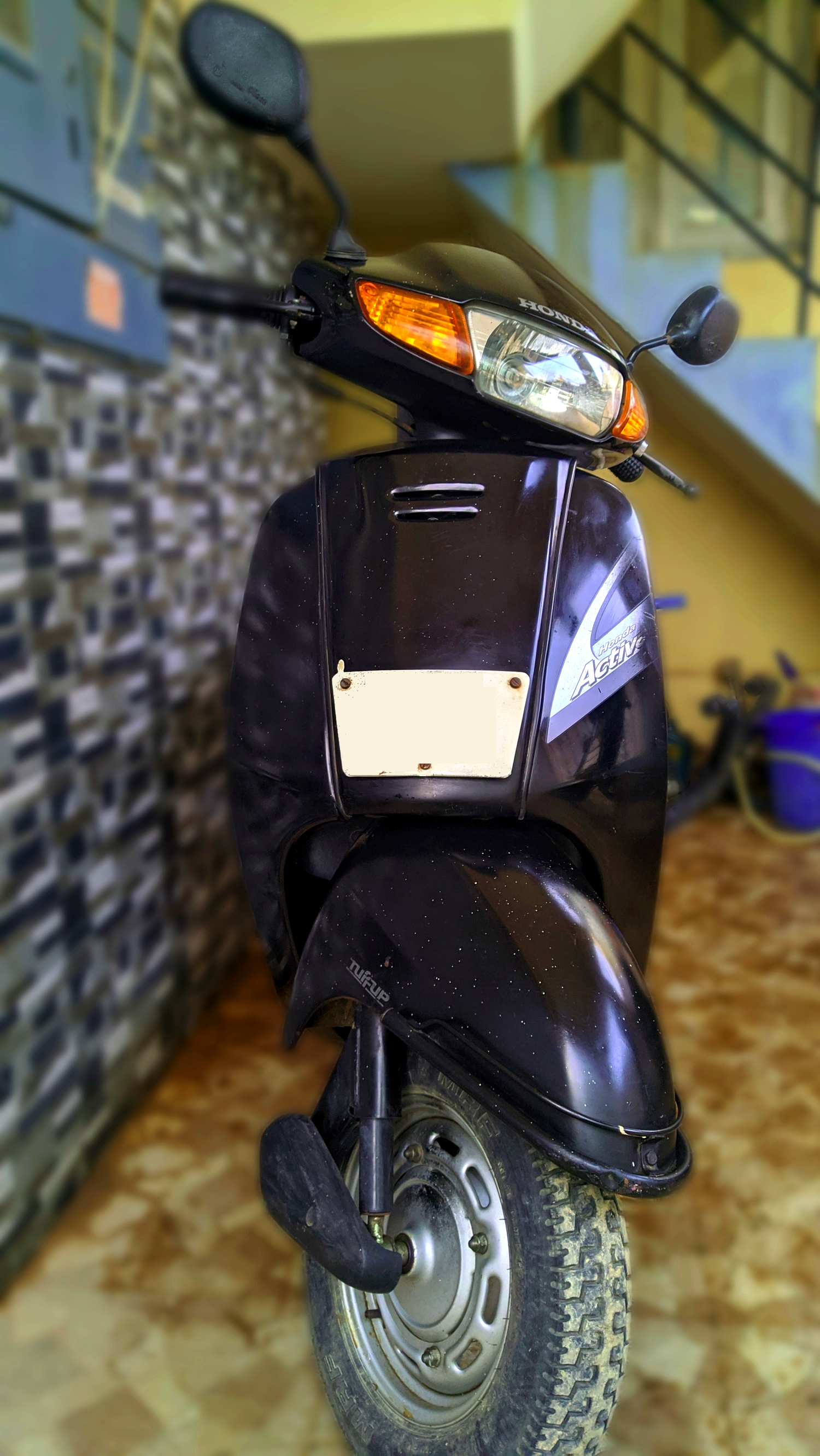
1st Generation Honda Activa

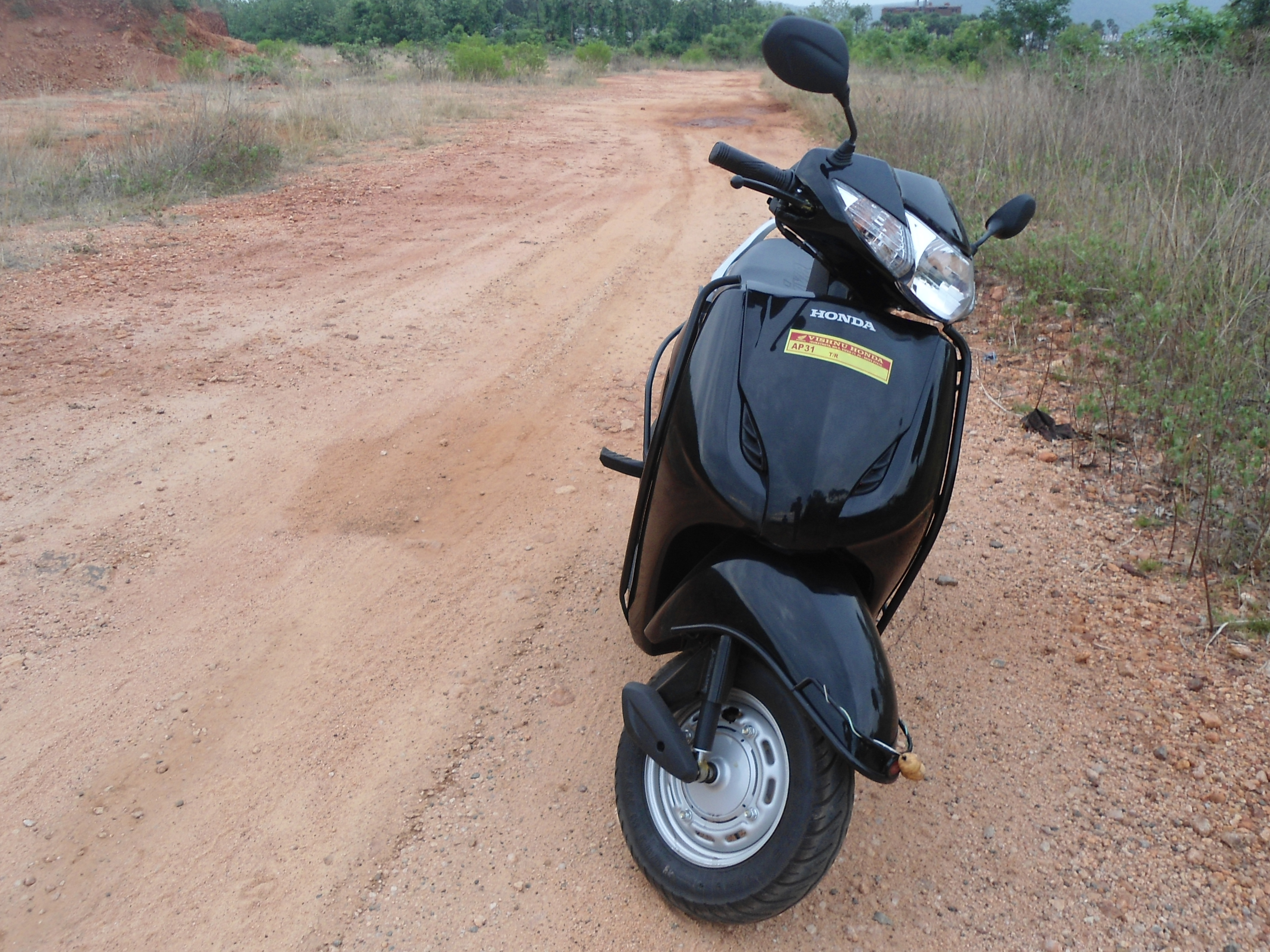
Black Honda Activa 2010 model

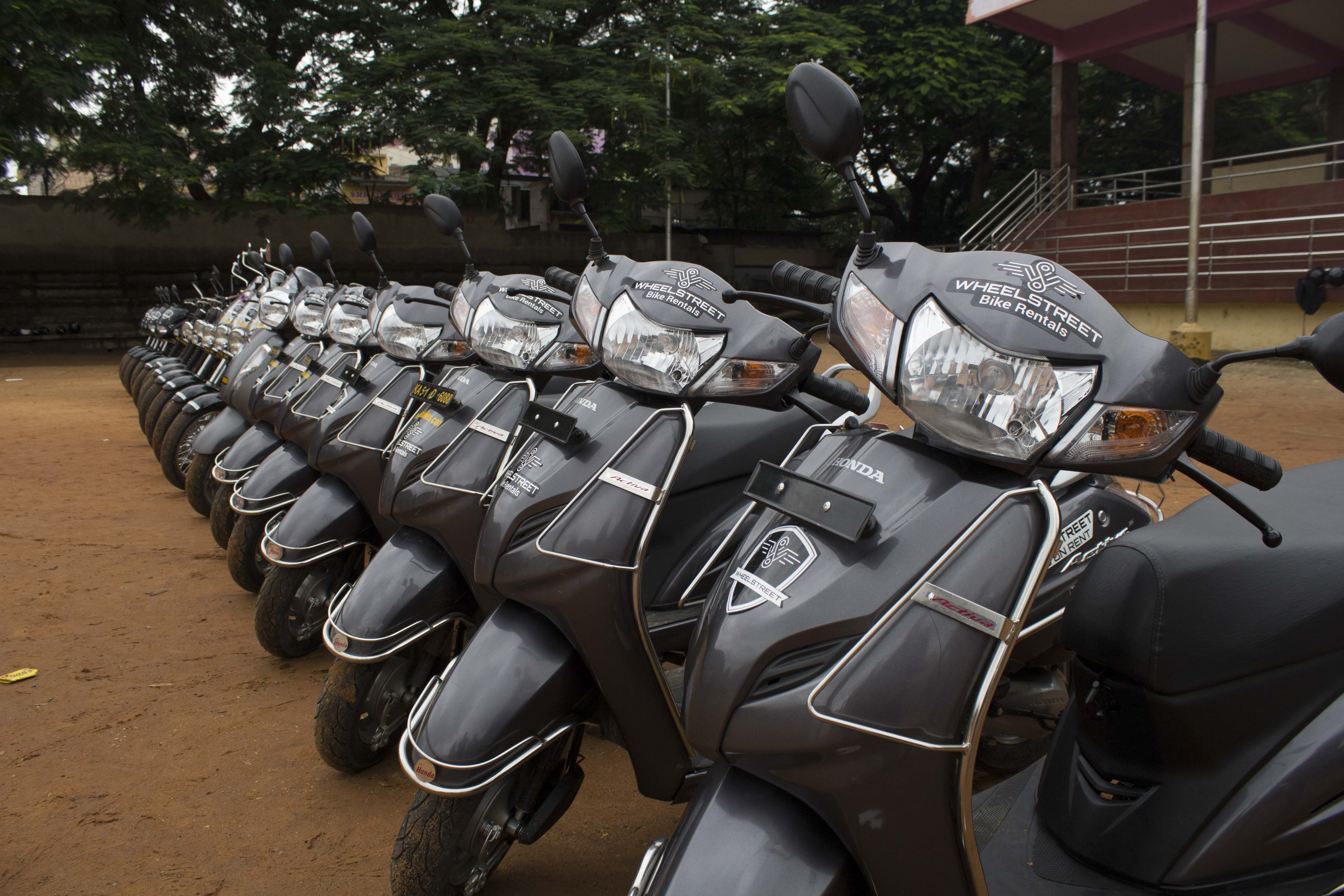
Lineup of Honda Activas, BS3 model

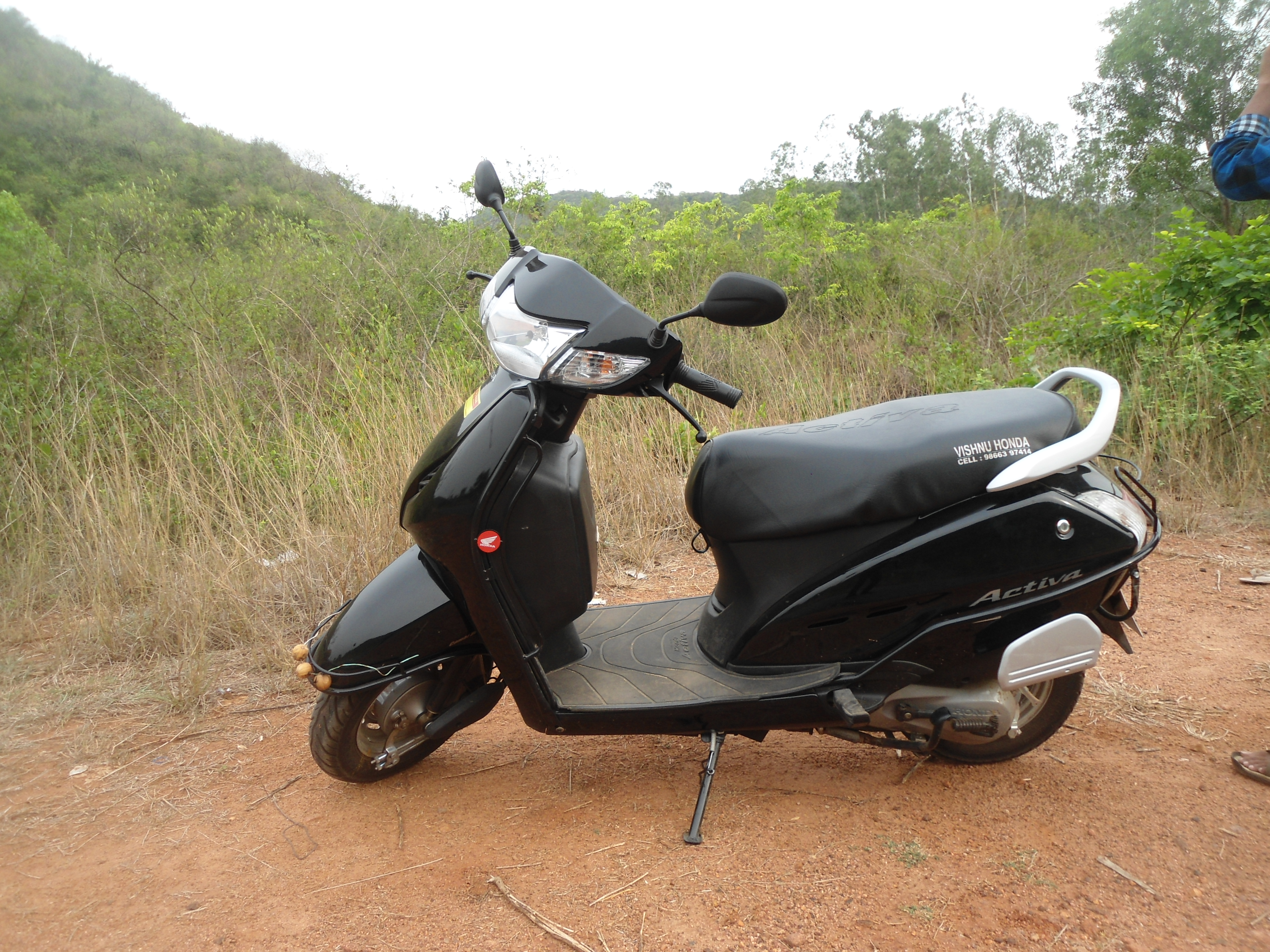
Black Honda Activa in Bakkanapalem

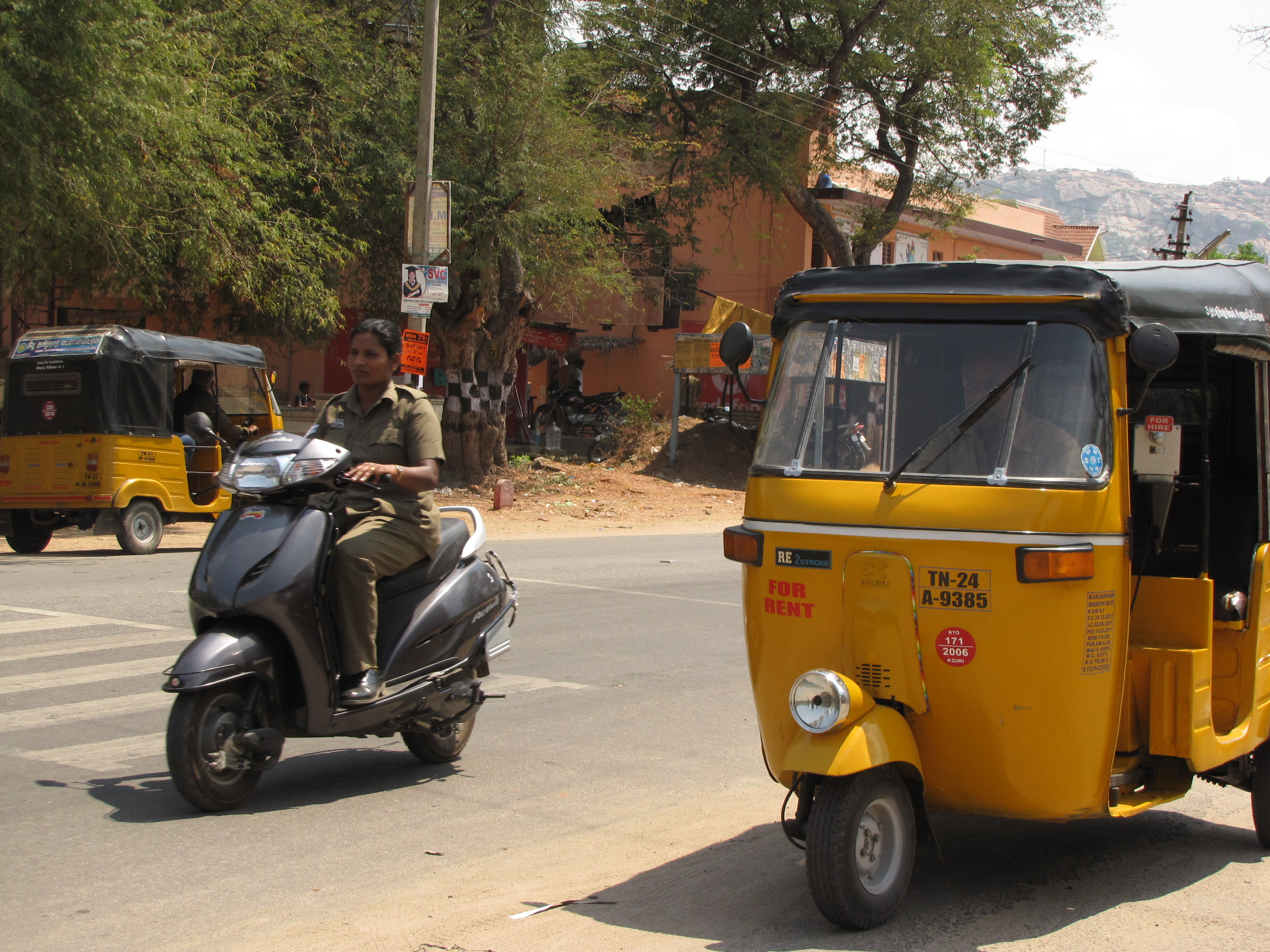
Honda Activa passing by an auto rickshaw in Krishnagiri

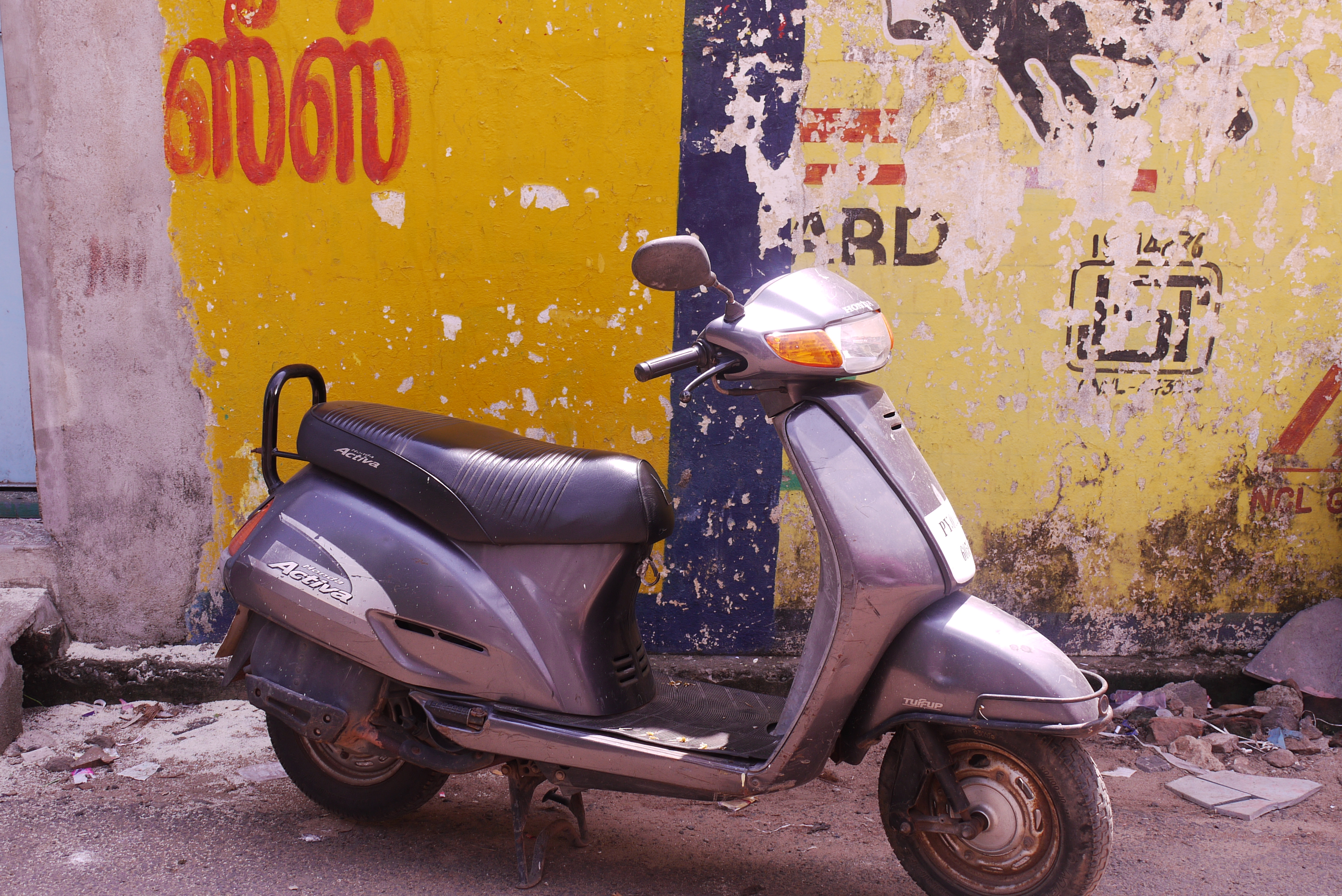
2001 Honda Activa model in Tamil Nadu

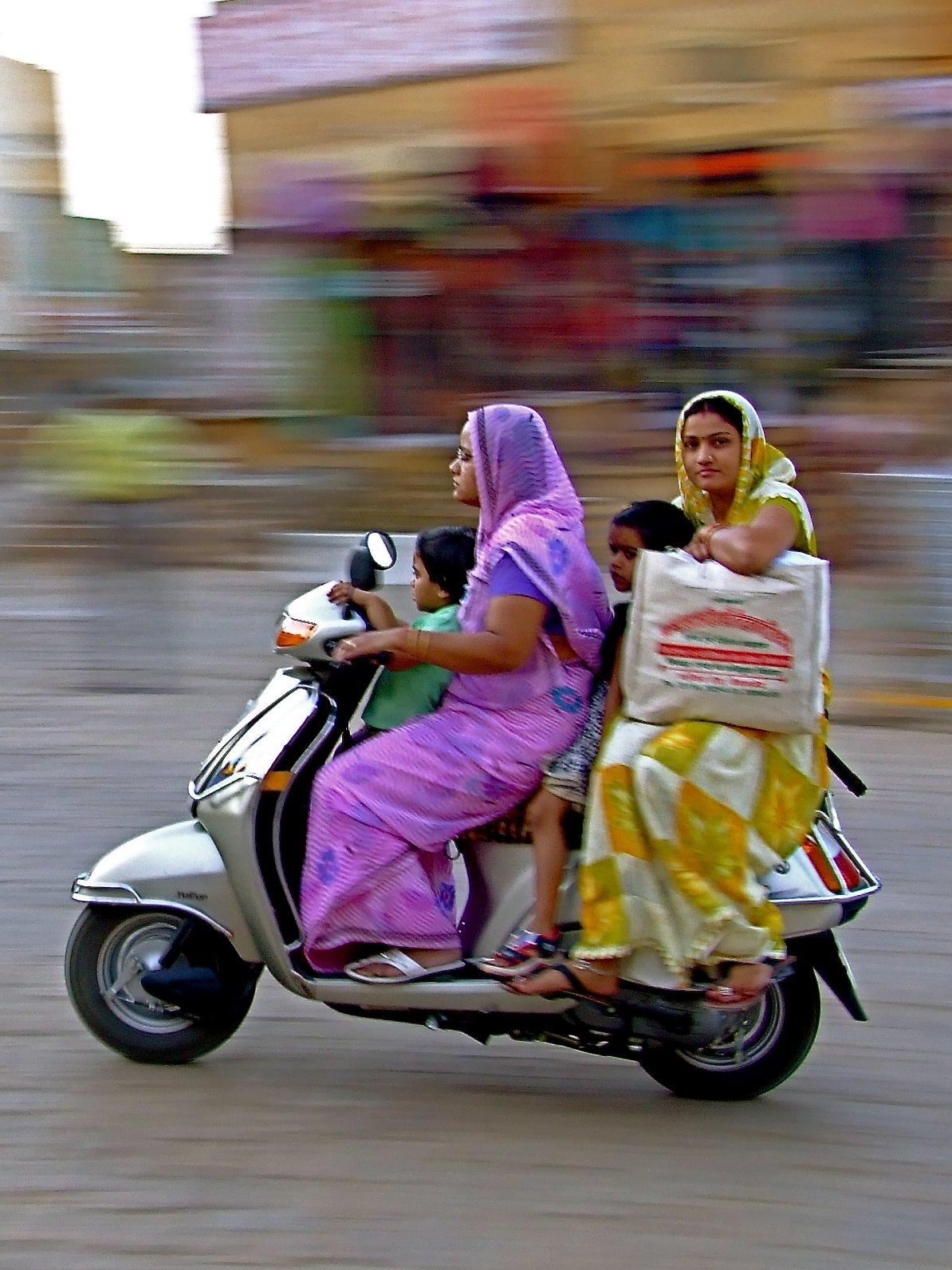
Women riding a Honda Activa

== See also ==
- TVS Jupiter
- Suzuki Access 125
- Piaggio Vespa
