= Kinetic Engineering Limited =

Indian automotive manufacturer

- Traded as: BSE: 500240
- Industry: Automotive
- Founded: 1972
- Founder: H. K. Firodia
- Headquarters: Pune, India
- Key people: Arun Firodia (chairperson); Ajinkya Firodia (Managing Director); Sulajja Firodia Motwani (vice-chair)
- Products: Kinetic Luna
- Parent: Firodia Group
- Subsidiaries: Kinetic Honda
- Website: kineticindia.com

Kinetic Engineering Limited is an Indian automotive manufacturer. The company was founded in the year 1972 by H. K. Firodia. Today it is an automotive component manufacturer which formerly sold two-wheelers under the brand names Kinetic Honda and later Kinetic Motors. It introduced the Kinetic Luna moped which sold well domestically and was exported extensively to Argentina, Brazil, Sri Lanka, and the United States.

Later Kinetic Engineering formed a joint venture with Honda Motor Company to introduce Kinetic Honda scooters, which had electric start and gearless transmissions. Kinetic and Honda parted ways in 1998 when the Firodias bought the majority stake of the joint venture from Honda.

In December 2000 Kinetic launches the Challenger 100 motorcycle in India.

In October 2001, Kinetic, together with its South Korean partner Hyosung, began production of the GF125 motorcycle, assembled at the Pune plant using components imported from South Korea. This model would also be exported to foreign markets by Hyosung.

In 2002, the Boss 100 motorcycle was launched, equipped with an independently developed four‑stroke single‑cylinder engine. The following year, the Boss models with a 115 cc engine were introduced, along with the Velocity 115 and the sporty Hyosung GF 170 Laser, the latter designed in collaboration with Hyosung and also intended for export.

In January 2004, Kinetic acquired from the Italian company Italjet the production and distribution rights for seven scooters in a deal worth 50 million dollars. Specifically, Kinetic intended to manufacture and launch on the Indian market the Italjet Velocifero, Jet Set, Torpedo, Millenium, Jupiter, Dragster and Formula models under the sub‑brand "Italiano", while exporting them under license with the Italjet brand to Europe and North America. The following year, the first model was introduced: the Kinetic Blaze 165, which was essentially the former Italjet Millennium. However, its lukewarm reception in the Indian market (due to the large engine displacement) and the fact that exports to foreign markets never began led to the halt of development and production of the remaining six ex‑Italjet models.

In January 2006, Kinetic formed an alliance with the Taiwanese manufacturer SYM to produce scooters in India to be sold under the Kinetic-SYM brand. SYM also acquired about 11.1% of Kinetic's shares. This partnership made it possible to launch the Flyte 125 scooter in 2007, derived from the SYM Xpro 125.

In 2008, Kinetic entered into a joint venture with Mahindra Automobiles, where Mahindra held an 80% stake. By this joint venture, Mahindra acquired the two-wheeler manufacturing facilities as well as the then selling brands of Kinetic.

After ceasing two-wheeler manufacturing, Kinetic Engineering produces and exports automotive components. Kinetic Motors resumed operations in January 2011 and has announced plans to produce electric vehicles under the newly launched Kinetic Green Brand.

In February 2014, Kinetic sold its stake in Mahindra Two-Wheelers to Samena Capital for 182 crore rupees.

In January 2022, Kinetic entered into a partnership with the Chinese group Aima Technology for the development and production in India of electric scooters using Aima's technologies.

A new version of the Luna called the E-Luna launched in February 2024. The prebookings were open from on 26 Jan 2024 .

At present the company produce electric two and three wheelers.

In July 2025, the joint venture "Kinetic Green Tonino Lamborghini Pvt Ltd." is established in Pune for the production of luxury golf carts designed by Tonino Lamborghini. Also in the same month the Kinetic DX electric scooter is launched. Designed by Alessandro Tartarini and manufactured at the Ahilya Nagar plant, its styling is inspired by the Kinetic Honda DX produced in India in the 1980s (itself derived from the Honda NH Lead).

== Kinetic Luna ==
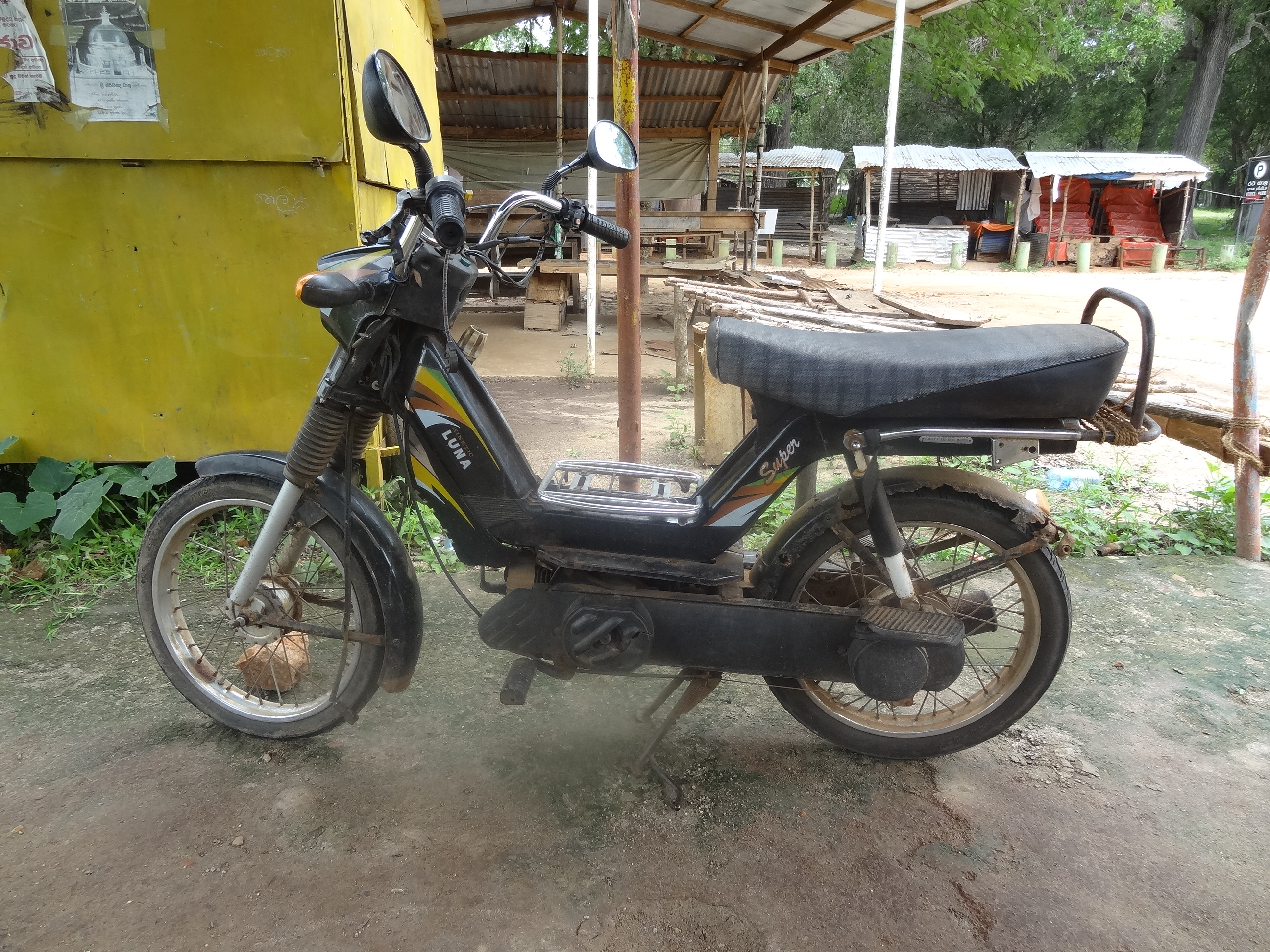
Kinetic Luna Super in Sri Lanka 2013

Kinetic Luna is a 50 cc moped that was introduced by Kinetic Engineering in India in 1972 and based on the italian Piaggio Ciao. The Kinetic Luna continues to be produced and marketed in India. It is marketed in the US as Kinetic TFR. A 35 cc version, the Luna Wings, was also produced. The original Luna of 1972 was a licensed copy of Piaggio Ciao moped. It has since been updated by Kinetic until the end of production in early 2000s.

=== Models ===
Luna kinetic

- Luna TFR (out of production)
- Luna TFR Plus
- Luna Double plus
- Luna Wings
- Luna Magnum
- Luna Super

== Kinetic E-Luna ==
Kinetic E-Luna
- Manufacturer: Kinetic Engineering Limited
- Production: 2024–present
- Predecessor: Kinetic Luna
- Class: Electric Moped
- Top speed: 60 km/h
- Power: 1,2 kW
- Suspension: Telescopic Fork front suspension and dual shock rear suspension
- Dimensions: L: 1985mm W: 735mm H: 1036mm
- Seat height: 760mm
- Weight: 96kg (dry)
- Range: ~100km

The Kinetic E-Luna is an Electric bike build by Kinetic Green and based on the Kinetic Luna. It was launched on February 7, 2024.

Kinetic announced that it would start bookings for the E-Luna on 26 January with a reservation fee of ₹500.

=== Development ===
Kinetic had started a pilot project around September 2023 in some locations of Maharashtra with an aim to sell the vehicle to a couple of thousand people and gather customer feedback using prototype models, which were met with success.

The company intends to target the ₹25,000-30,000 monthly income group which uses public transportation, such as shared automobiles or local buses. The company is aiming for 5,000 electric Lunas per month. The company hopes to gross close to ₹30 crore annually

=== Design ===
The e-Luna was introduced with three battery packs. The first batch will have a 2 kWh battery pack which will give a range of 80 km. The company also hopes to introduce a 1.5 kWh battery pack for Tier 2 and Tier 3 markets for a 40–45 km range, and a 3 kWh battery pack, which will give a range of 100–125 km, . the Kinetic E-Luna comes with Telescopic Fork front suspensions and dual shock rear suspension. It would have a top speed of around 60 kph, a weight of 96 kg (212 lb), a seat height of 760 mm (30 in), and a ground clearance of 170 mm. The batteries will be made inhouse with three different variants – chargeable, removable and swappable.

The model will come with four drive modes - ECO, City, Speed and Sport. It will be more rugged, with an improved halogen headlight and white color-turned indicators on the side. It will have a fully digital console and an app for connectivity control.

In December 2024, Kinetic unveiled plans to extend the range of the moped using a 4.3kWh battery pack with a range of 250 kilometres. It was planned to be available by January 2025.

== See also ==
- H. K. Firodia Awards
- Ather Rizta
- TVS I-QUBE
