= TVS iQube Electric =

- Manufacturer: TVS Motor Company
- Production: 2020-present
- Class: Electric scooter
- Engine: 4.4 kW BLDC electric motor
- Top speed: 78 km/h
- Torque: 140Nm
- Suspension: front: Telescopic suspension rear: Hydraulic twin tube shock absorber
- Brakes: front: Disc - 220 mm rear: Drum - 130 mm
- Wheelbase: 1301 mm
- Dimensions: L: 1805 mm W: 1140 mm
- Fuel capacity: 2.3–5.3 kWh Lithium-ion battery (variant-dependent)

TVS iQube Electric is an electric scooter manufactured by TVS Motor Company. It was launched in January, 2020 with a limited number of dealerships in Bangalore and is now available in 20 cities across India.

The TVS iQube is powered by a 4.4 kWh electric hub-mounted motor that makes 140 Nm of torque and it delivers a pick-up of 0 to 40 km/h in 4.2 seconds. The scooter has a max speed of 78 km/h and a range of 100km/charge.

The TVS iQube is equipped with a Combined Braking System (CBS). CBS ensures that both the front and rear brakes apply simultaneously when the rider hits the brakes.

== Activities ==
2021 - September - On World EV Day, TVS iQube was launched in 22 new cities.

2021 - October - TVS Motor partnered with Tata Power to expand of EV charging network across the country.

2022 - January - TVS Motor Company partnered with Swiggy to deploy TVS iQube electric scooters across India.

2022 - April - TVS Motor announced a partnership with Jio-BP to set up charging infrastructure across India.

2025 - July - TVS Motor Launched New Variant iQube 3.1 kWh with 123 km Range.

== Variants ==
TVS iQube variants (as of September 2026)
Variant	Battery	Claimed range (IDC)	Price (ex-showroom)
iQube 2.3 kWh	2.3 kWh	114 km	₹0.94434 lakh (US$980)
iQube 3.1 kWh	3.1 kWh	123 km	₹1.00 lakh (US$1,000)
iQube 3.5 kWh	3.5 kWh	145 km	₹1.08993 lakh (US$1,100)
iQube MillionR Edition	3.5 kWh	145 km	₹1.08993 lakh (US$1,100)
iQube S	4.7 kWh	175 km	₹1.17642 lakh (US$1,200)
iQube ST	5.3 kWh	212 km	₹1.58834 lakh (US$1,600)

== See also ==
- Gogoro
- Ather Rizta
- Hero MotoCorp
- Okinawa Autotech
- Ola Electric
- Battery electric vehicle
- Plug-in electric vehicle
- Plug-in electric vehicles in India
