= Honda Aviator =

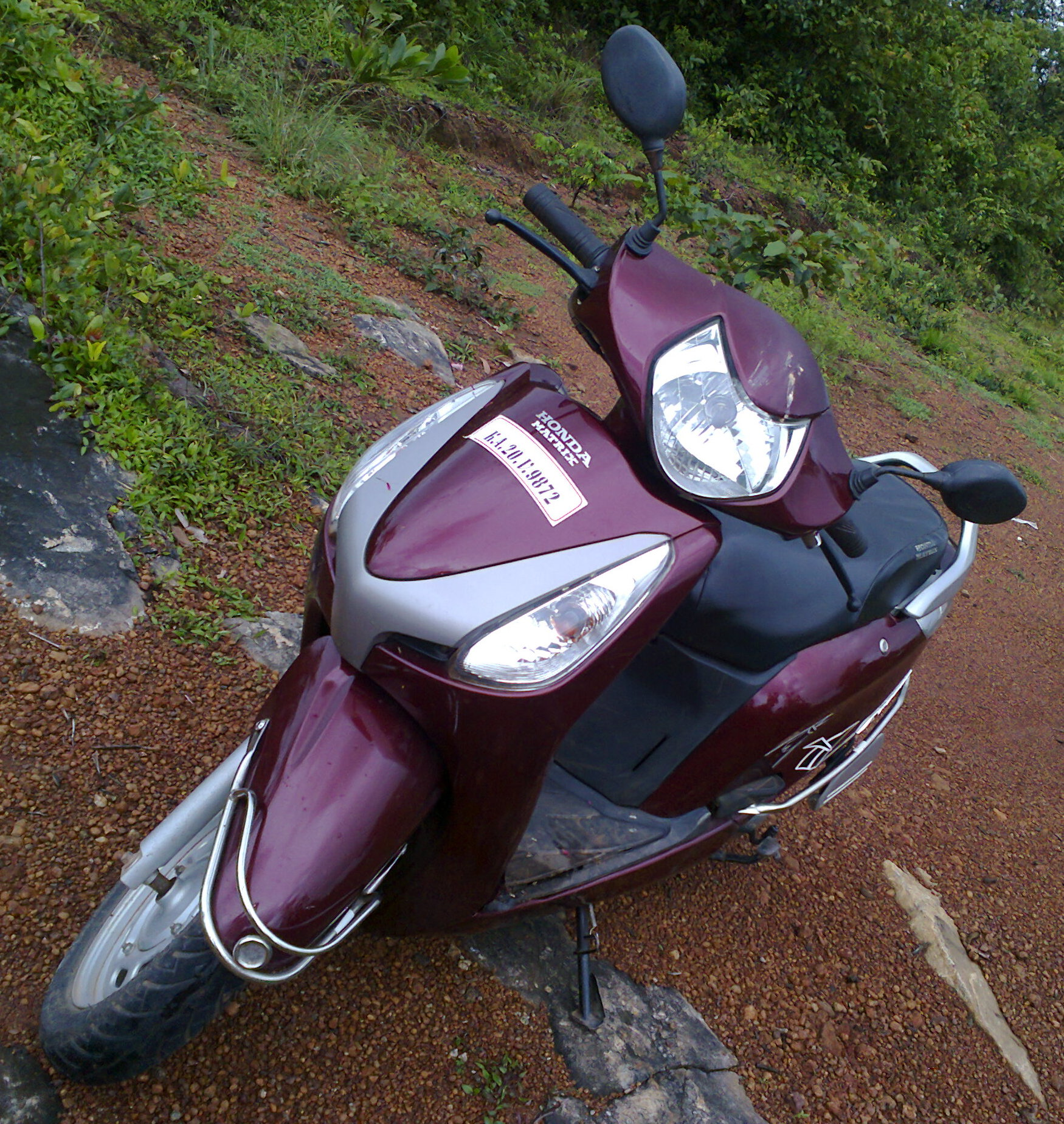
- First-generation Honda Aviator
- Manufacturer: Honda Motorcycle and Scooter India
- Production: 2008–2020
- Class: Motor scooter
- Engine: 109 cc (6.7 cu in), four-stroke, air-cooled, OHC, single-cylinder
- Power: 8 bhp
- Torque: 8.77 Nm
- Ignition type: Electric start (kick-start available on some variants)
- Transmission: V-Matic (CVT)
- Suspension: Front: telescopic Rear: swingarm with spring-loaded hydraulic damper
- Brakes: 130 mm drum (rear); front drum or 190 mm disc (variant dependent)
- Wheelbase: 1,256 mm (49.4 in)
- Dimensions: L: 1,802 mm (70.9 in); W: 703 mm (27.7 in); H: 1,162 mm (45.7 in)
- Seat height: 790 mm (31 in)
- Weight: 103 kg (227 lb) (dry)
- Fuel capacity: 4 L (0.88 imp gal; 1.1 US gal)
- Oil capacity: 0.8 L (0.18 imp gal; 0.21 US gal)
- Fuel consumption: 60 km/L (claimed)
- Related: Honda Activa, Honda Dio

The Honda Aviator was a motor scooter produced by Honda Motorcycle and Scooter India (HMSI) from 2008 to 2020. HMSI positioned the Aviator as a more premium offering in the 110 cc scooter segment, with variant-dependent equipment such as a front disc brake and a larger front wheel on select trims.

== Overview ==
The Aviator used a four-stroke, air-cooled, single-cylinder engine paired with Honda's V-Matic (CVT) automatic transmission. HMSI marketed the model with the slogan "Live Your Style".

== Launch and positioning ==
When launched, reports highlighted variant-dependent features such as a 190 mm front disc brake and a 12-inch front alloy wheel (Deluxe variant), which HMSI claimed improved stability and braking performance.

== Variants ==
BikeWale described the Aviator as being sold in multiple trims, including versions with steel wheels and drum brakes, alloy wheels, and a higher variant featuring a front disc brake with alloy wheels; BikeWale also noted combined braking as standard on later listings of the model.

== Updates ==
In 2009, HMSI publicised updates to the Aviator including a combined braking system ("combi-brake") and BS-III readiness ahead of wider emissions implementation.

In July 2018, HMSI launched an updated Aviator featuring an LED headlamp and position lamp, along with a revised instrument console and other feature additions such as a 4-in-1 lock with seat opener switch (as reported by multiple outlets).

== Reception ==
Autocar India noted that the Aviator was intended to sit above entry-level offerings in Honda's scooter portfolio, but it remained overshadowed by higher-volume models in the market; Autocar reported in 2020 that Honda would replace the Aviator with a new product as part of its portfolio changes during the BS6 transition.

== Awards and recognition ==
At the NDTV Profit Car and Bike Awards 2009, the Honda Aviator won Scooter of the Year.

== Discontinuation ==
During the industry's transition to BS6 emission norms in 2020, the Aviator was removed from HMSI's official website along with other models that had not yet received BS6 updates, according to multiple publications. Team-BHP reported that the Aviator was no longer listed on the official website at the time, and linked this to the BS6 transition, with media reports indicating discontinuation of the model.

== Timeline ==
- March 2008 – HMSI launched the Aviator in India in Standard and Deluxe variants, positioned as a premium 110 cc automatic scooter.
- October 2009 – HMSI unveiled the “New Aviator” with feature/variant updates (including combined braking/combi-brake in period reporting) and BS-III readiness (as communicated in HMSI’s announcement).
- July 2018 – HMSI launched the 2018 Aviator update, adding an LED headlamp/position lamp and convenience features such as a 4-in-1 lock with seat opener switch (reported across outlets and HMSI communication).
- April 2020 – During the BS6 transition, the Aviator was removed from HMSI’s India website in industry reporting; Autocar India later reported Honda would discontinue the Aviator and replace it with a new premium 110 cc product.

== See also ==
- Honda Activa
- Honda Dio
- TVS Jupiter
- Suzuki Access 125
