= Pullingo =

Tamil slang word

Pullingo (Note: Also spelled pullinko, pullaingo or pullingow. Tamil: புல்லைங்கோ(பிள்ளைகள்)) (meaning squad of male friends) is a slang variant of the Tamil word "பிள்ளைகள்" (children, offspring). The term was popularised by the 2019 Gaana song "Gumbalaga Suthuvom" by Gaana Stephen, which received 50 million views in 7 months.. It became an internet phenomenon in the same year and is since used as a casteist pejorative.

It negatively portrays marginalised male teenagers from Tamil Nadu, India as reckless youth who colour their hair, sport unusual hairstyles, wear skinny jeans, ride Honda Dio scooters, engage in reckless driving, street racing, and use specific slang varieties. The Tamil YouTube channel, Eruma Saani, received backlash for using the term in one of their skits, prompting them to take down the video.Critics, including Gaana Stephen himself, have complained about the negative effects of the term on the marginalised community in Tamil Nadu.

"Pullingo" has often been compared to the Hindi caste slur "Chapri".
