= Honda Livo =

- Manufacturer: Honda
- Production: 2015–present (India)(Bangladesh : 2018-)
- Predecessor: Honda CB Twister
- Class: Standard
- Engine: 109.51 cc (6.683 cu in), air-cooled four stroke, single-cylinder
- Power: 6.47 kW (8.68 hp) @ 7500 rpm (claimed)
- Torque: 9.30 N⋅m (6.86 lbf⋅ft) at 5500 rpm (claimed)
- Transmission: Four-speed manual chain drive
- Suspension: Front: Telescopic fork Rear: Spring Loaded Hydraulic
- Brakes: Drum (front and rear); Disc front (optional)
- Tires: Front 80/100-18"; Rear 80/100-18", tubeless type
- Wheelbase: 1,285 mm (50.6 in)
- Dimensions: L: 2,020 mm (80 in); W: 746 mm (29.4 in); H: 1,099 mm (43.3 in)
- Weight: 111 kg (245 lb) (claimed) (wet)
- Fuel capacity: 8.5 L (1.9 imp gal; 2.2 US gal)

The Honda Livo is a 110cc motorcycle by Honda Motorcycle and Scooter India (a Honda company) in India and other countries. It is regarded as the next version of the Honda Twister with improvements in look and seat style. Honda also incorporated Honda Intelligent Ignition Control System (HIICS) for the first time for better performance. The Livo is the only motorcycle to offer Honda HIICS technology in this segment.

== Features ==
The bike comes with Honda-Eco Technology (HET) which claims to reduce friction within the moving parts of the engine, further increasing fuel efficiency. Honda claims 74kmpL mileage as a result of improvements to the 110cc engine & chassis that Honda introduced with Honda CB Twister.

While the original version (released July 2015) came with analog speedometers & fuel gauge, Honda revised the designs with a digital speedometer as well as added in a digital trip-meter on newer models released since 2017. Another change Honda made throughout the 110-125cc segment is the original 6-spoke alloy wheels were replaced with new 5-spoke designs. Honda reflected this change throughout the 110-125cc segment in all models released since 2018.

== Release ==
The Honda Livo was officially announced in July 2015. Since December 2018, Bangladesh Honda Private Limited (BHL) started the manufacturing of Honda Livo 110 in Bangladesh. . The bike is primarily manufactured in India at Honda's Narsapura plant in the state of Karnataka.
