= Honda CBF125 =

Motorcycle

Honda CBF125 / CB125F
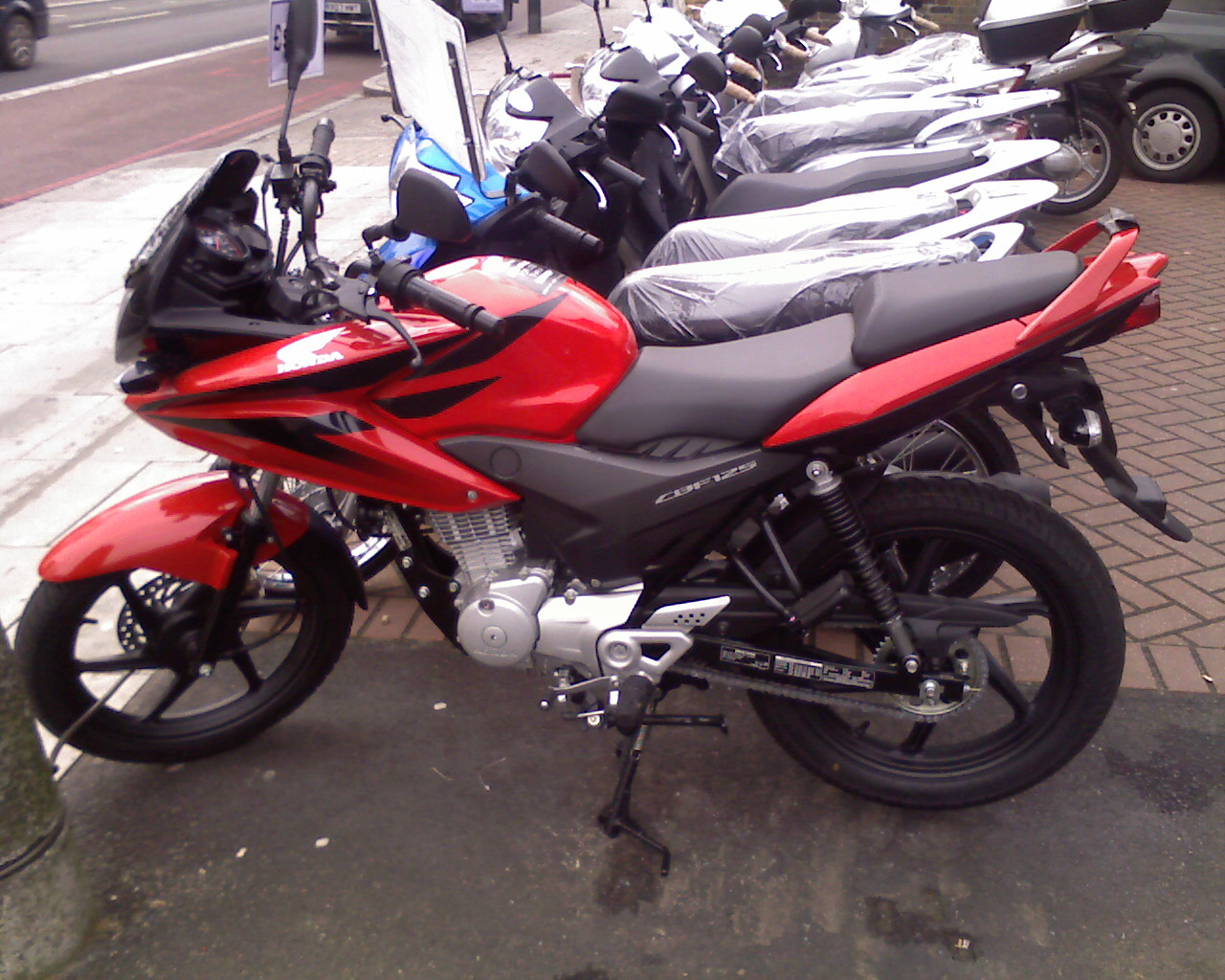
- Honda CBF125
- Manufacturer: Honda Motorcycle and Scooter India
- Also called: Stunner, CBF125M9, JC40
- Parent company: Honda
- Production: 2008–2015 (CBF125); 2015–present (CB125F)
- Assembly: India; China (CB125F); Pakistan (CB125F)
- Predecessor: CG125
- Class: Standard
- Engine: 124.7 cc (7.61 cu in), air-cooled, 4-stroke, 2-valve, SOHC, single
- Ignition type: Computer-controlled fully transistorised with electronic advance
- Transmission: 5-speed manual
- Frame type: Diamond; steel
- Suspension: Front: telescopic fork
- Brakes: Front: 240mm single disc with twin-piston caliper Rear: 130mm drum
- Tires: 80/100 17 (front); 100/90 17 (rear)
- Wheelbase: 1.27 m (4 ft 2 in); 1.295 m (4 ft 3.0 in) (CB125F)
- Dimensions: L: 1.955 m (6 ft 5.0 in); 2.035 m (6 ft 8.1 in) (CB125F); W: 0.76 m (2 ft 6 in); 0.765 m (2 ft 6.1 in) (CB125F); H: 1.11 m (3 ft 8 in); 1.08 m (3 ft 7 in) (CB125F)
- Seat height: 0.792 m (2 ft 7.2 in); 0.775 m (2 ft 6.5 in) (CB125F)
- Fuel capacity: 13 L (2.9 imp gal; 3.4 US gal)

The Honda CBF125 and CB125F are lightweight, small-capacity motorcycles produced for road riders from 2008. The differences between CBF125 and CB125F are that the CB uses a fork mounted fairing whereas the CBF uses a frame mounted fairing.

== Honda CBF 125 ==
The Honda CBF125 is a motorcycle manufactured by Honda's Indian subsidiary HMSI from 2008. The motorcycle is known as Stunner in the Indian market, with two variants, the carburetor version simply called Stunner and the fuel-injected version called Stunner PGM-FI. In European, Chinese and Singaporean markets, only the fuel-injected version is available.

The bike went on sale in early December 2008 in the UK. The CBF125 replaced the CG125, a model which had been in production for more than thirty years.

== Honda CB125F ==
The Honda CB125F was announced in November 2014, and fully unveiled on 13 April 2015. The CB125F replaces the Honda CBF125, a model which had been in production since 2008 and which was Europe's best selling motorcycle. The official launch price was lower than the price of the previous CBF125. The new model will be manufactured in China, whereas the previous model was manufactured in India. It was launched in Pakistan in 2019 replacing the Honda Deluxe.

In 2021 Honda introduces the all new CB125F which was a badge-engineered Honda SP125, it was redesigned around a super-efficient "eSP" engine and a lighter, better-handling chassis. Overall losing 11kg in weight taking the 2021 model down to just 117 kg. New equipment included a digital dash and LED headlight. In addition, the single-cylinder air-cooled, 2-valve eSP (enhanced Smart Power) PGM-FI fuel-injected engine was re-designed with a slightly offset cylinder, reducing friction and increasing fuel efficiency to 65km/L, giving a potential 800km range on a full tank.

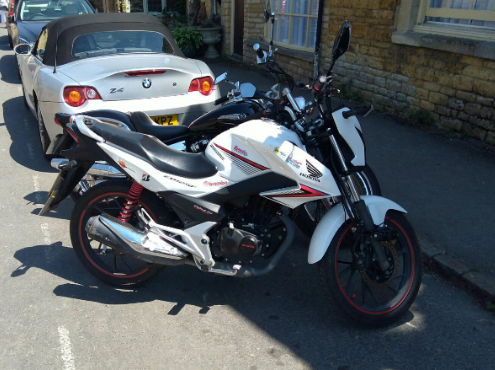
2015 CBF

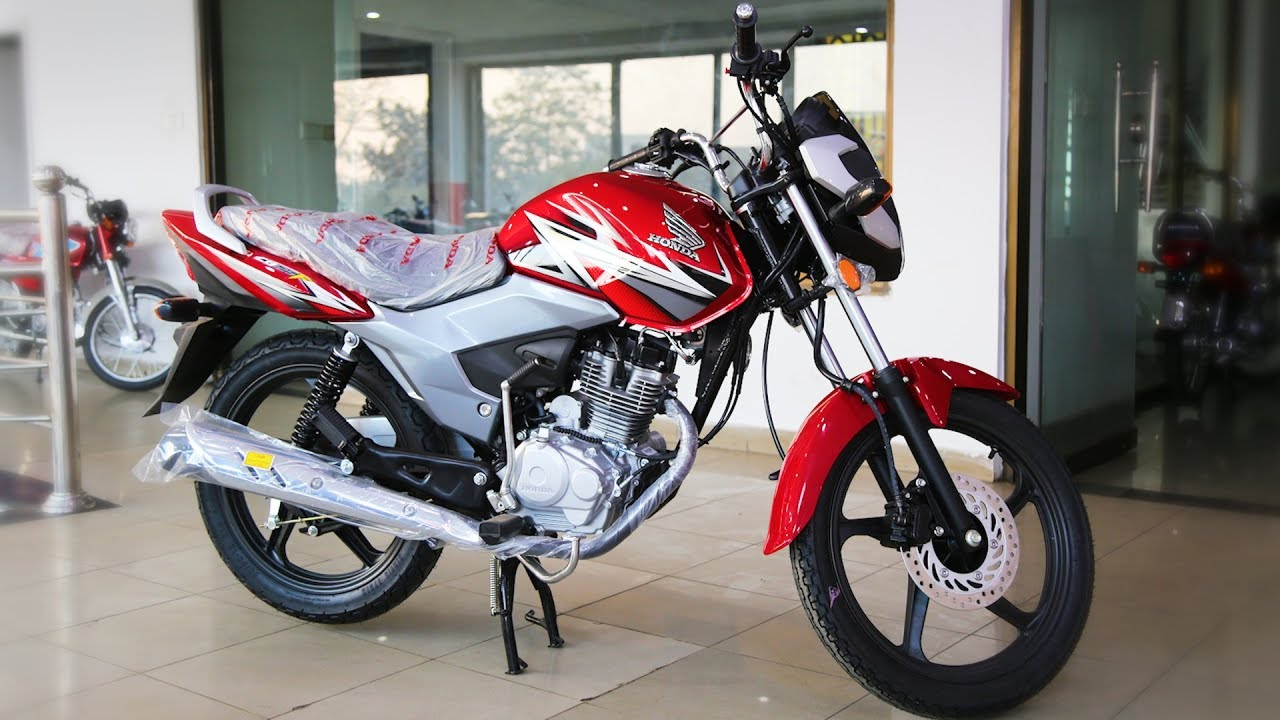
CB125F in Pakistan
