= Honda CB Twister =

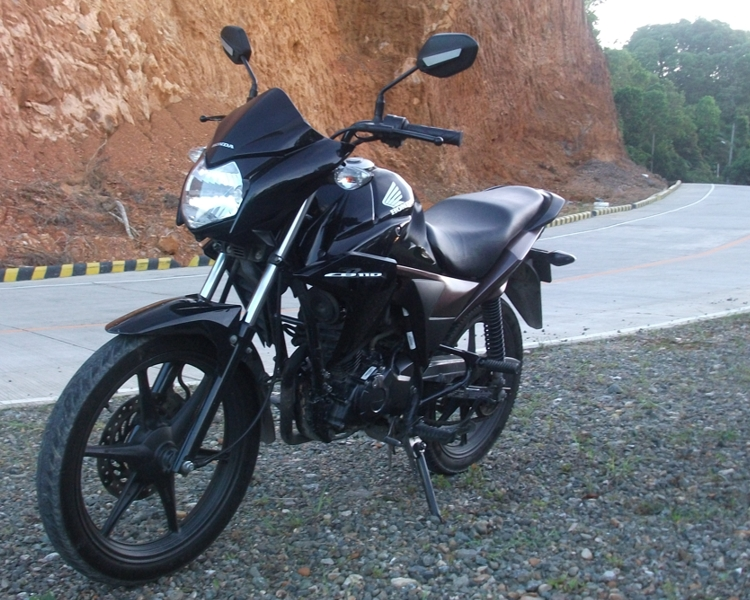
- Manufacturer: Honda Motorcycle and Scooter India
- Also called: Honda CB110 (Colombia and Philippines)
- Parent company: Honda
- Production: 2009–2015 (India) 2009-Present (Colombia)
- Class: Standard
- Engine: 109.1 cc (6.66 cu in) air-cooled 4-stroke 2-valve SOHC single-cylinder
- Bore / stroke: 50.0 mm × 55.6 mm (1.97 in × 2.19 in)
- Compression ratio: 9.0:1
- Power: 9.12 hp (6.8 kW) @ 8,000 rpm
- Torque: 9.0 N⋅m (6.6 lb⋅ft) @ 6,000 rpm
- Ignition type: CDI
- Transmission: Four-speed, constant mesh manual, chain drive
- Brakes: Front: Single 240 mm (9.4 in) hydraulic disc Rear: drum
- Wheelbase: 1,262 mm (49.7 in)
- Dimensions: L: 1,972 mm (77.6 in); W: 742 mm (29.2 in); H: 1,075 mm (42.3 in)
- Weight: 108 kg (238 lb) (dry)
- Fuel capacity: 8 L (1.8 imp gal; 2.1 US gal)
- Oil capacity: 1 L (0.22 imp gal; 0.26 US gal)
- Fuel consumption: 45 km/L (130 mpg_{‑imp}; 110 mpg_{‑US})

The Honda CB Twister is a 110 cc standard motorcycle produced by Honda Motorcycle and Scooter India in India since 2009. This model has been discontinued in India with its successor named Honda Livo. It is sold as the CB110 in Colombia and the Philippines.
