= Honda Motorcycle and Scooter India =

Wholly owned Indian subsidiary of Honda

Honda Motorcycle and Scooter India Private Limited
- Type: Subsidiary
- Industry: Automotive
- Founded: 20 August 1999; 27 years ago
- Headquarters: Gurugram, Haryana, India
- Products: Motorcycles, scooters
- Production output: ▲4,890,000 units (2024)
- Revenue: ▲₹39,237.6 crore (US$4.1 billion) (2025)
- Net income: ▲₹3,726.8 crore (US$390 million) (2025)
- Parent: Honda Motor Company, Limited
- Website: www.honda2wheelersindia.com

Honda Motorcycle and Scooter India, Pvt. Ltd., abbreviated as HMSI, is the wholly owned Indian subsidiary of Honda, Japan. Founded in 1999, it was the fourth Honda automotive venture in India, after Kinetic Honda Motor Ltd (1984–1998), Hero Honda (1984–2011) and Honda Siel Cars India (1995–2012). HMSI was established in 1999 at Manesar, Gurugram, Haryana.

== Manufacturing Plants ==
Total capacity = 7.05 million units per annum

- Plant 1: Manesar, Gurugram (Haryana) - 1.6 million units
- Plant 2: Tapukara, Alwar (Rajasthan) - 1.2 million units
- Plant 3: Narsapura, Kolar (Karnataka) - 2.4 million units
- Plant 4: Vitthalapur, Ahmedabad (Gujarat) - 1.85 million units

== Vehicles ==
=== Motorcycles ===
- Honda Unicorn
- Honda SP 125
- Honda Shine 125
- CB125 Hornet
- Honda Livo
- Honda Shine 100
- Honda SP 160
- Honda Hornet 2.0
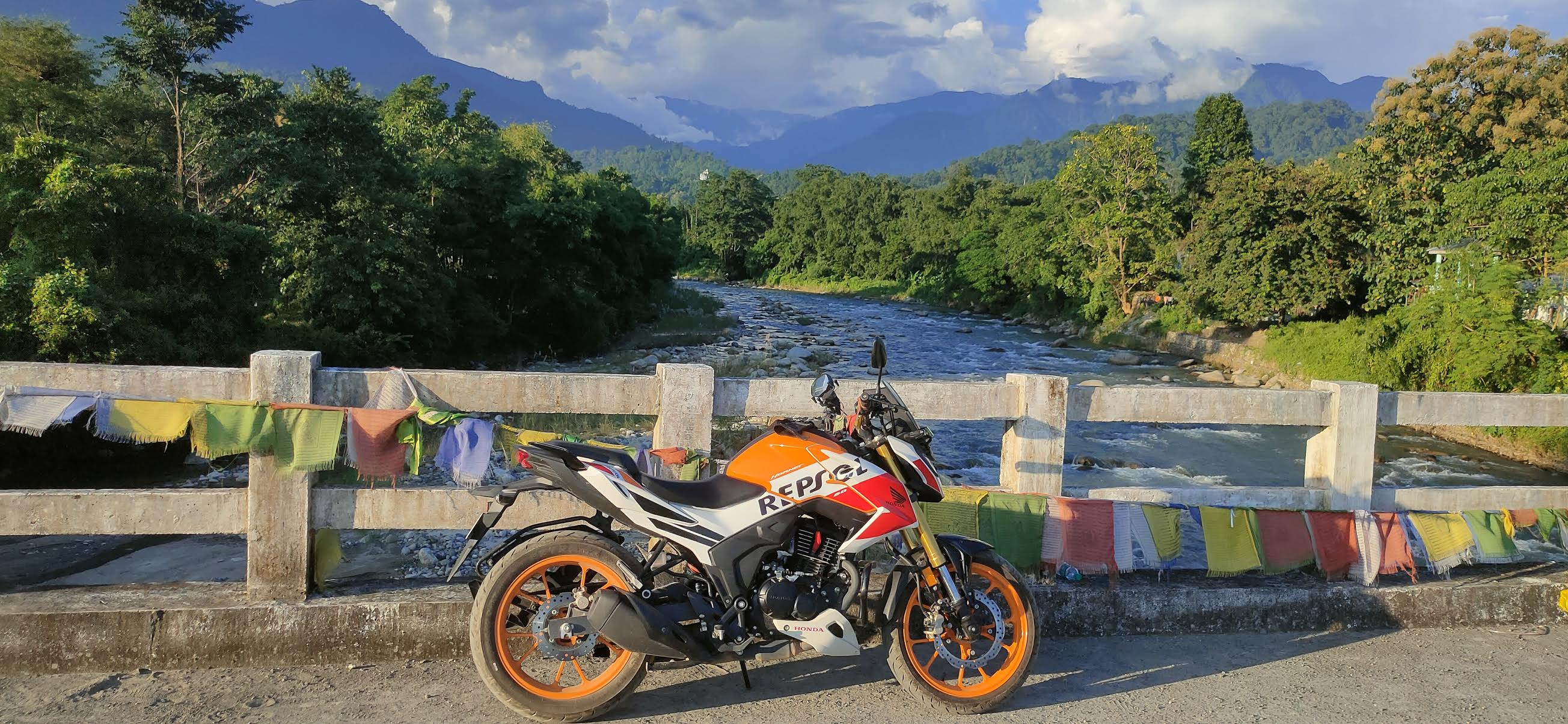
  Honda Hornet 2.0
- XL750 Transalp
- CB350RS
- H'ness CB350
- CB350
- CB300F
- NX200
- Rebel 500
- Rebel 300

=== Scooters ===
- Dio
- Activa-6G
- Activa 125
- Dio 125
- Honda X-ADV 750
- ADV 160

=== Sport bikes, Touring bikes, Adventure bikes ===
- GoldWing
- CB1000R
- CBR650R
- NX500
- CB750 Hornet
- CB1000 Hornet SP
- CB650R
- CBR1000RR
- CB500X
- Africa Twin

== Discontinued ==
=== Scooters ===
- Honda Eterno
- Honda Aviator
- Honda Cliq
- Honda Navi
- Honda Activa-i
- Honda Activa (1st Generation)
- Honda Activa (2nd Generation)
- Honda Activa 3g
- Honda Activa 4g
- Honda Activa 5g
- Honda Grazia

=== Electric Scooters ===
- Honda QC1
- Honda Activa-e
- Honda QC3

=== Motorcycles/Sports Bikes ===
- Honda CB Trigger 150
- Honda CB Unicorn Dazzler 150
- Honda CB Twister 110
- Honda CBF Stunner 125
- Honda Hornet 160r
- Honda CBR 150R
- Honda CBR 250R
- Honda CBR 650F
- Honda Dream Yuga
- Honda Stunner
- Honda Dream Neo
- Honda CB Unicorn 160
- Honda CB Shine SP
- Honda X-Blade
- Honda CD110 Dream Deluxe
- Honda CB300R

== ISO 14001 ==
HMSI got ISO 14001 certification in December 2002. HMSI plans to use the PDCA cycle for its environmental management system.
