= Honda Dio =

Honda motor scooter

The Honda Dio is a scooter manufactured by Honda. It was introduced in 1988 and was originally produced in Japan as a series of two-stroke models. In 2001, Honda introduced a four-stroke version, with production of the 50 cc (3.1 cu in) model transferred to Sundiro Honda Motorcycle Co., Ltd. in China. A four-stroke version has also been manufactured by Honda Motorcycle and Scooter India at its Narsapura, Karnataka, plant for the Indian market since 2001.

The Dio model range includes the AF-series 50 cc (3.1 cu in) (SK50), the JF-series 110 cc (6.7 cu in) (NSC110) manufactured in China, and the SCV100 and SCV110 models produced in India.

== Japan model ==
Honda Dio AF18 Series
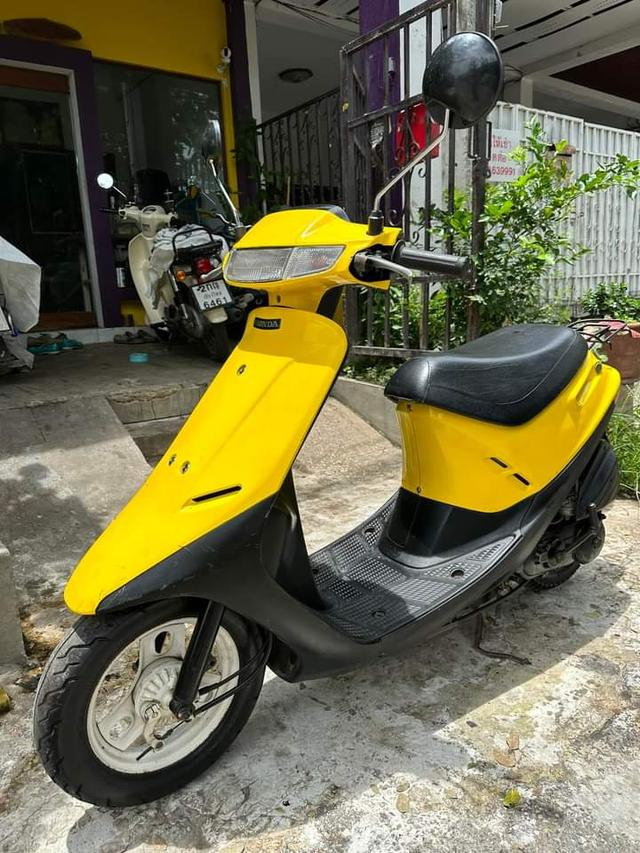
- 1st generation Dio
- Manufacturer: Honda
- Production: 1988–1992
- Assembly: Japan
- Class: Scooter
- Engine: 50 cc (3.1 cu in) (Two-stroke) (AF)
- Bore / stroke: 39mm x 41.4mm
- Compression ratio: 7.1:1
- Top speed: 60KPH (Speed Limited)
- Ignition type: Electric start
- Transmission: CVT Continuously Variable Transmission
- Brakes: Drum F/R (Disk front on AF25)
- Wheelbase: 1.140mm
- Seat height: 0.700m
- Weight: 63 Kg (dry); 68 Kg (wet)
- Fuel capacity: 4.5L
- Oil capacity: 1.2L

Introduced in 1988, the Honda Dio AF18 was the first model in the Dio series. It was powered by an air-cooled, 49 cc (3.0 cu in), two-stroke AF18E single-cylinder engine equipped with electric start. Early models featured a 12 mm crankshaft and produced 6.4 PS, while later revisions increased maximum output to 6.8 PS. The AF18 established the basic mechanical layout and styling that would characterize subsequent Dio models.

Several special editions were produced during the AF18's production run, including the SE, Aztek Edition, Marine Edition, and SP. The SP variant adopted the sportier appearance of the later Dio SR while retaining the standard AF18 mechanical specification.

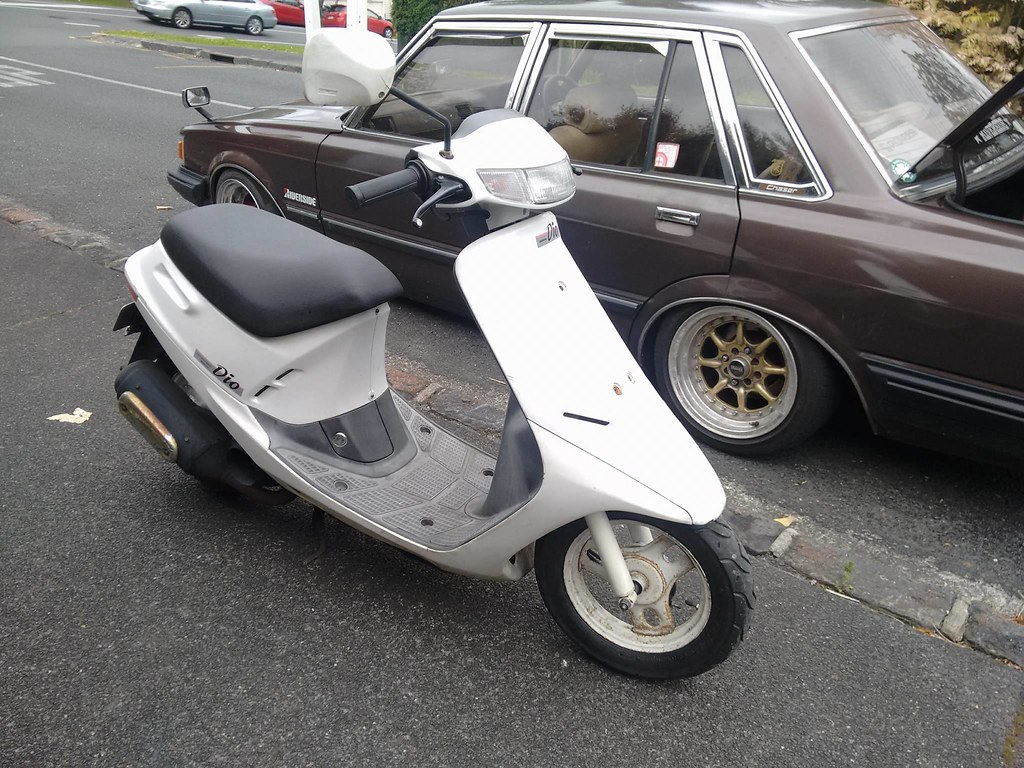
AF18 showing the dual side scoops

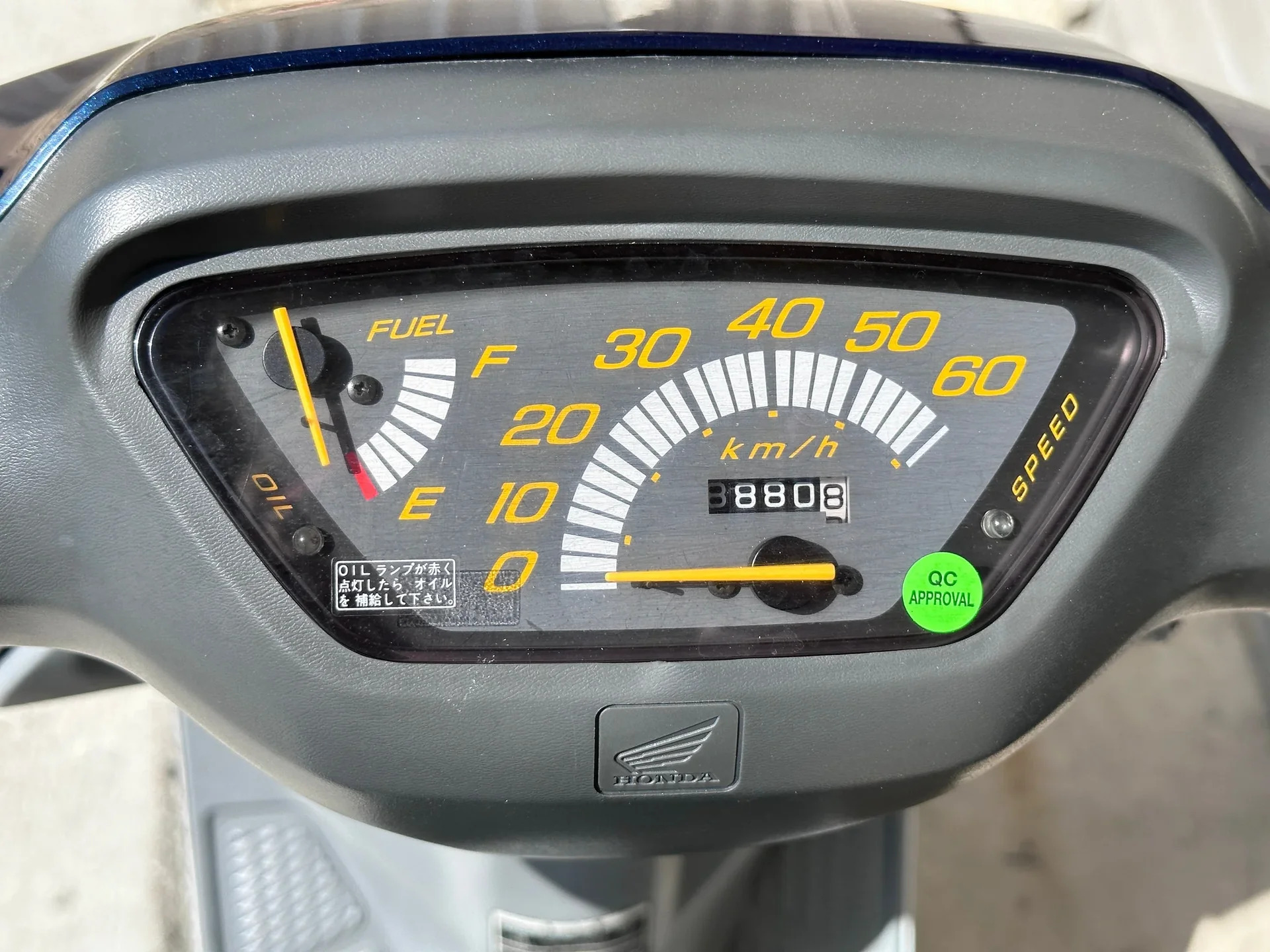
Instrument panel

In 1990, Honda introduced the Dio SR (AF25), a higher-specification variant of the AF18. Although assigned a new model designation, the AF25 retained the first-generation Dio chassis while incorporating revised suspension, a front disc brake, an upgraded intake and airbox, and sport-oriented styling. During the same model year, Honda also revised the standard AF18, with both models adopting the updated intake and airbox design that remained in production until the first-generation platform was discontinued in 1992.

Honda Super Dio AF27 Series
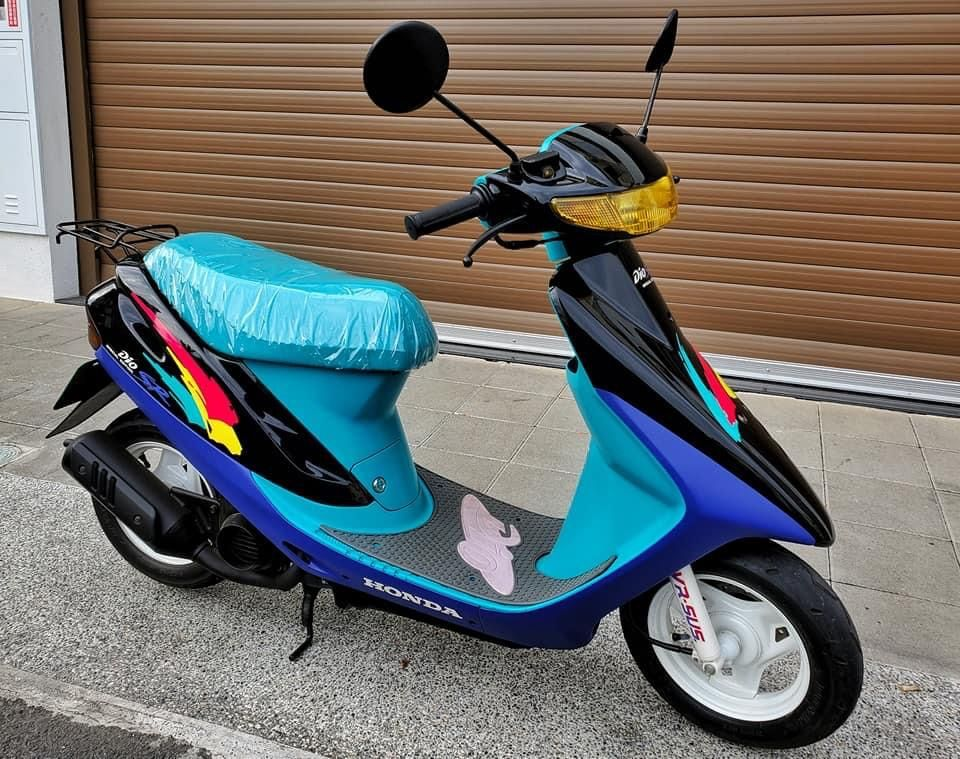
- 2nd generation Dio
- Manufacturer: Honda
- Production: 1991–2001
- Assembly: Japan
- Class: Scooter
- Engine: 50 cc (3.1 cu in) (Two-stroke) (AF)
- Bore / stroke: 39mm x 41.4mm
- Compression ratio: 7.1:1
- Top speed: 60KPH (Speed Limited)
- Ignition type: Electric start
- Transmission: CVT Continuously Variable Transmission
- Brakes: Drum F/R (Disk front on AF28)
- Wheelbase: 1.140
- Seat height: 0.700m
- Weight: 63 Kg (dry); 68 Kg (wet)
- Fuel capacity: 5.0L
- Oil capacity: 1.2L

The Honda Super Dio (AF27) was introduced in 1991 as the second generation of the Dio series. It featured an all-new chassis design with revised, more aerodynamic bodywork compared to the first-generation model. Early AF27 models continued to use the AF18E engine with a 12 mm crankshaft and an output of approximately 6.8 PS. A speed-limiting CDI unit was also introduced to comply with Japanese regulations restricting maximum moped speed.

In the same year, Honda released the Super Dio SR (AF28). While based on the AF27 chassis, the SR variant featured revised styling, updated suspension components, and a front disc brake. It also included distinctive graphics and revised colour schemes compared to the standard model.

In 1992, the AF18E engine was revised with a larger 14 mm crankshaft interface replacing the earlier 12 mm design. This change improved durability at the variator interface, and all subsequent AF18E engines adopted the revised configuration.

The Dio ZX (AF28), introduced in 1992, was a performance-oriented variant of the Super Dio. It featured a revised cylinder with 1mm higher port timing on all ports, a modified crankshaft, different transmission ratios, a larger CVT pulley set, an upgraded drive belt, and a revised exhaust system. The model also used a reconfigured CDI unit and a #78 main jet. Output was increased to approximately 7 PS, making it the most powerful variant of the AF28 lineup.

The Dio ZX was equipped with a front disc brake and distinctive body graphics. It became popular among scooter enthusiasts in Japan and other Asian markets. Additional AF28 variants included the Dio XR BAJA and special edition ZX models.

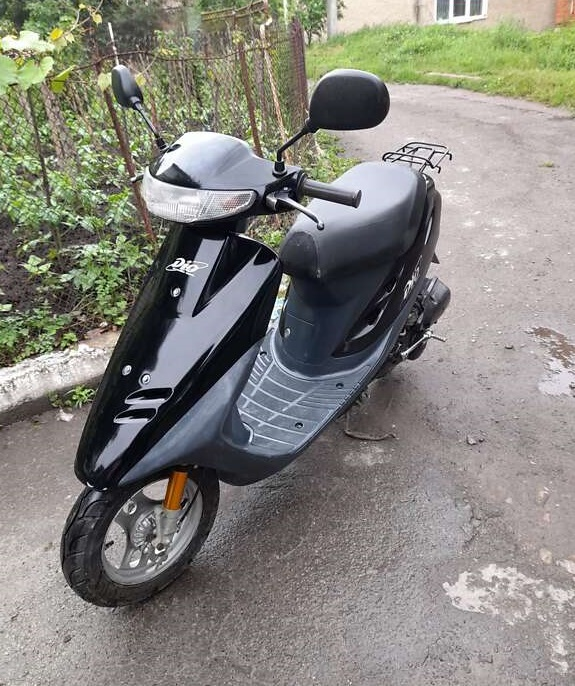
AF27 (scoop at the left)

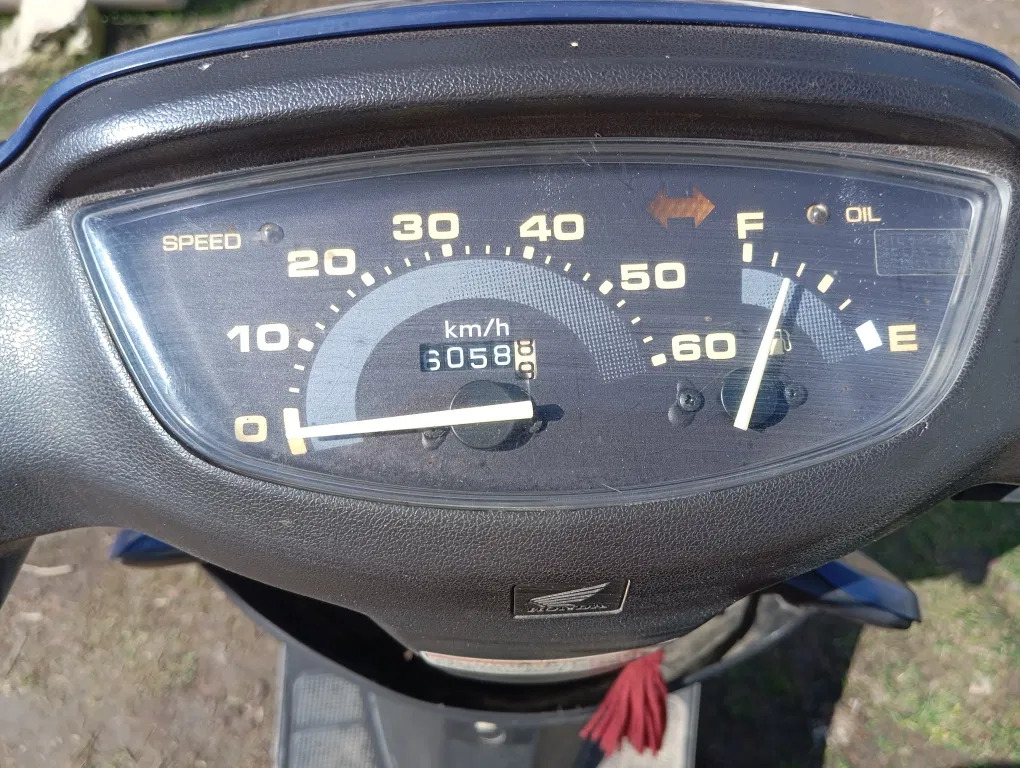
AF27 Display Panel

Later in the AF27 production cycle, Honda introduced the Dio Fit in 1997. Although the AF34/AF35 generation had already been introduced by this time, the Dio Fit continued production of the AF27 platform as a lower-cost model option.

Honda Dio AF34 Series
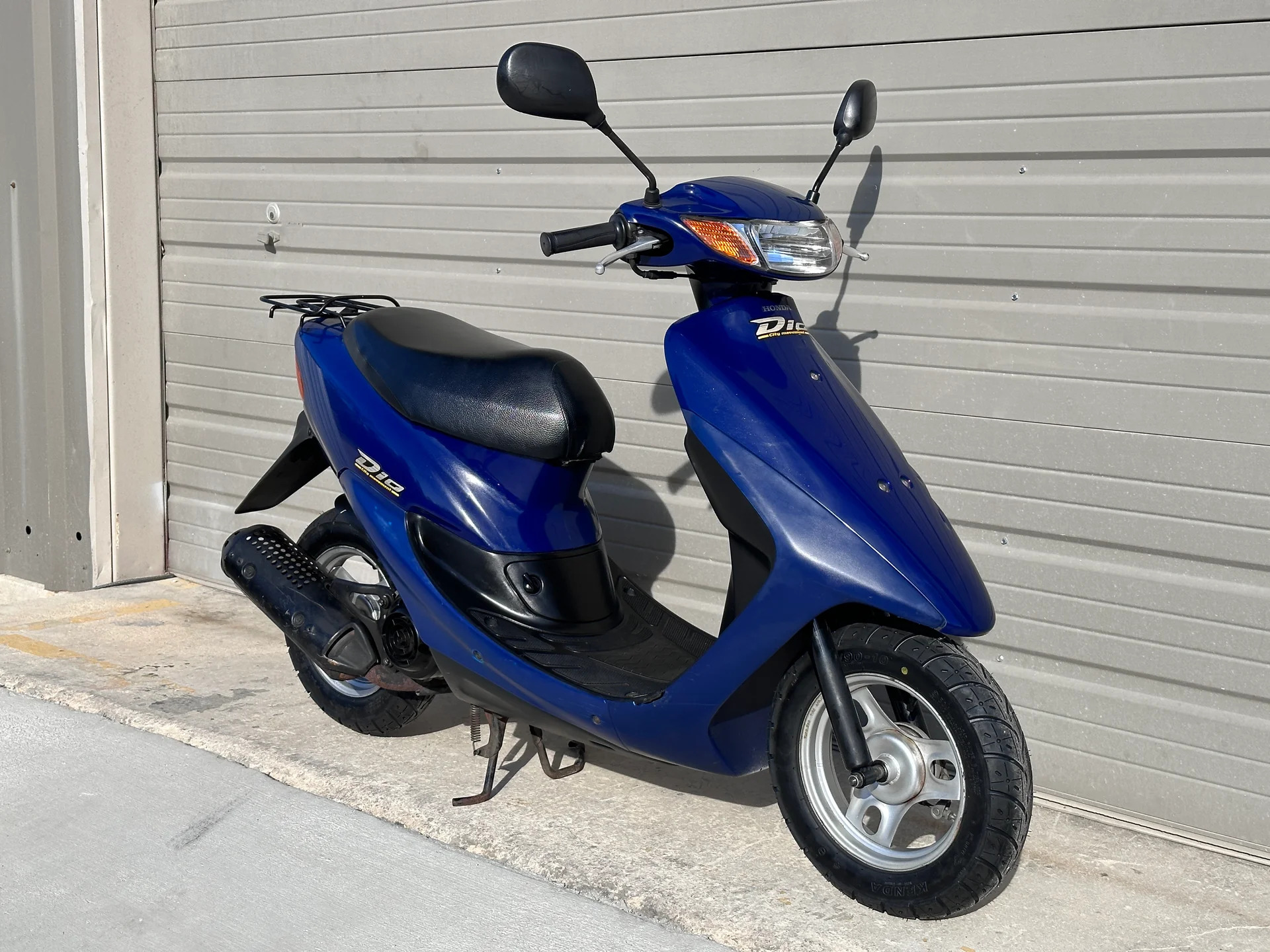
- 3rd generation Dio
- Manufacturer: Honda
- Production: 1995–2004
- Assembly: Japan
- Class: Scooter
- Engine: 50 cc (3.1 cu in) (Two-stroke) (AF)
- Bore / stroke: 40mm x 39.3mm
- Compression ratio: 7.1:1
- Top speed: 60KPH (Speed Limited)
- Ignition type: Electric start
- Transmission: CVT Continuously Variable Transmission
- Brakes: Drum F/R (Disk front on AF35)
- Wheelbase: 1.145mm
- Seat height: 0.700m
- Weight: 68 Kg (dry); 73 Kg (wet)
- Fuel capacity: 5.3L
- Oil capacity: 1.3L

The Honda Dio AF34 and AF35 were introduced in 1995 as the third generation of the Dio series. This generation marked a significant redesign, featuring an all-new tubular underbone frame and more aerodynamic bodywork compared to previous models. The AF34 served as the standard variant, while the AF35 Dio ZX functioned as the higher-performance version.

The AF34/AF35 series introduced a revised horizontal 49 cc AF-series engine. Although the engine shared conceptual similarities with earlier units, it incorporated a redesigned crankshaft, cylinder, and intake system. The continuously variable transmission (CVT) system was carried over from the previous generation with minor revisions.

The AF35 Dio ZX was positioned as the performance model within the range. It featured a front disc brake, sport-oriented suspension tuning, and distinctive graphics. Early versions of the AF35 ZX produced approximately 7.2 PS, making it the most powerful production two-stroke Dio model. Later versions were detuned to approximately 6.4 PS to comply with Japanese regulations.

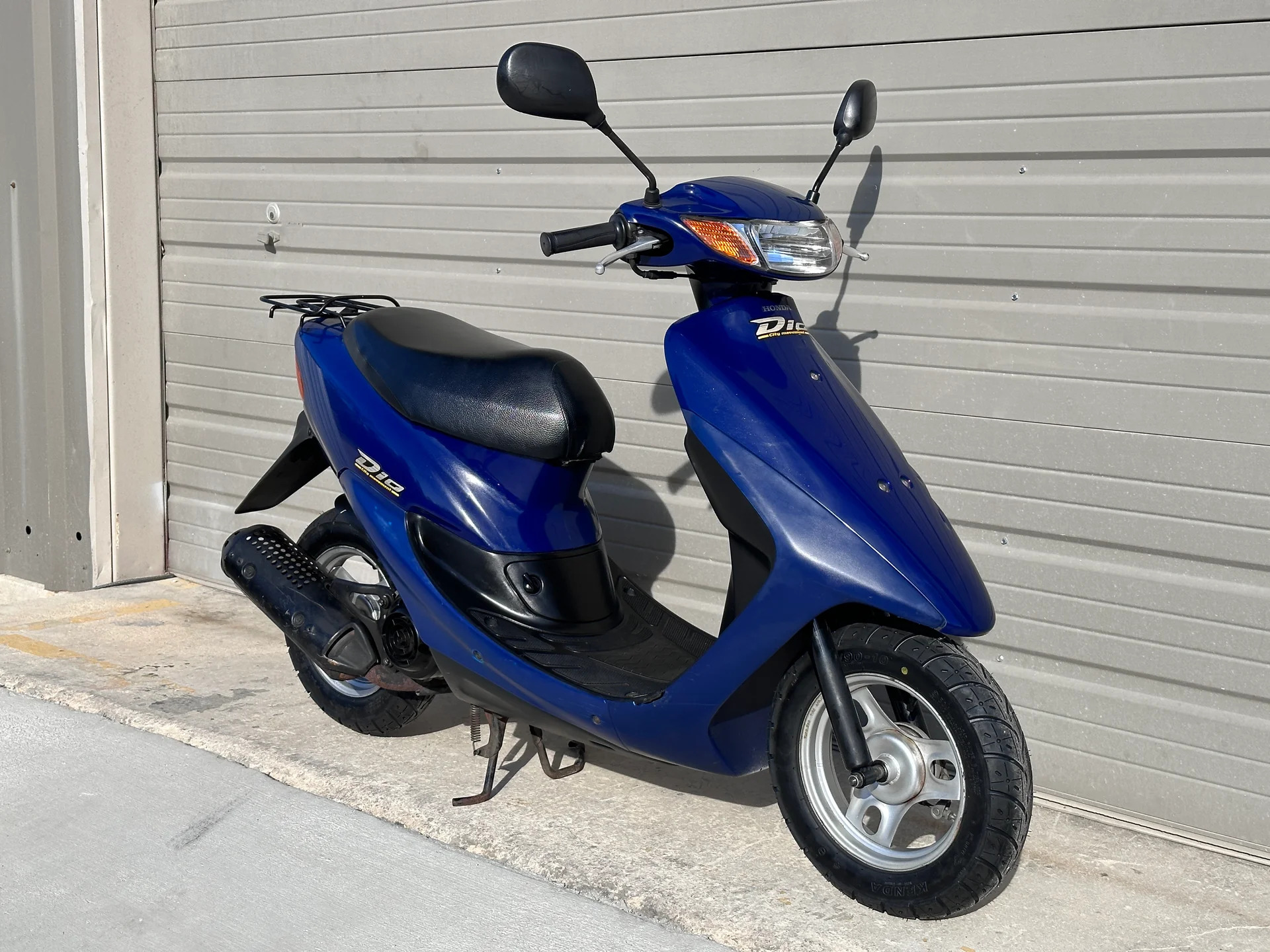
AF34 new design, different from AF27

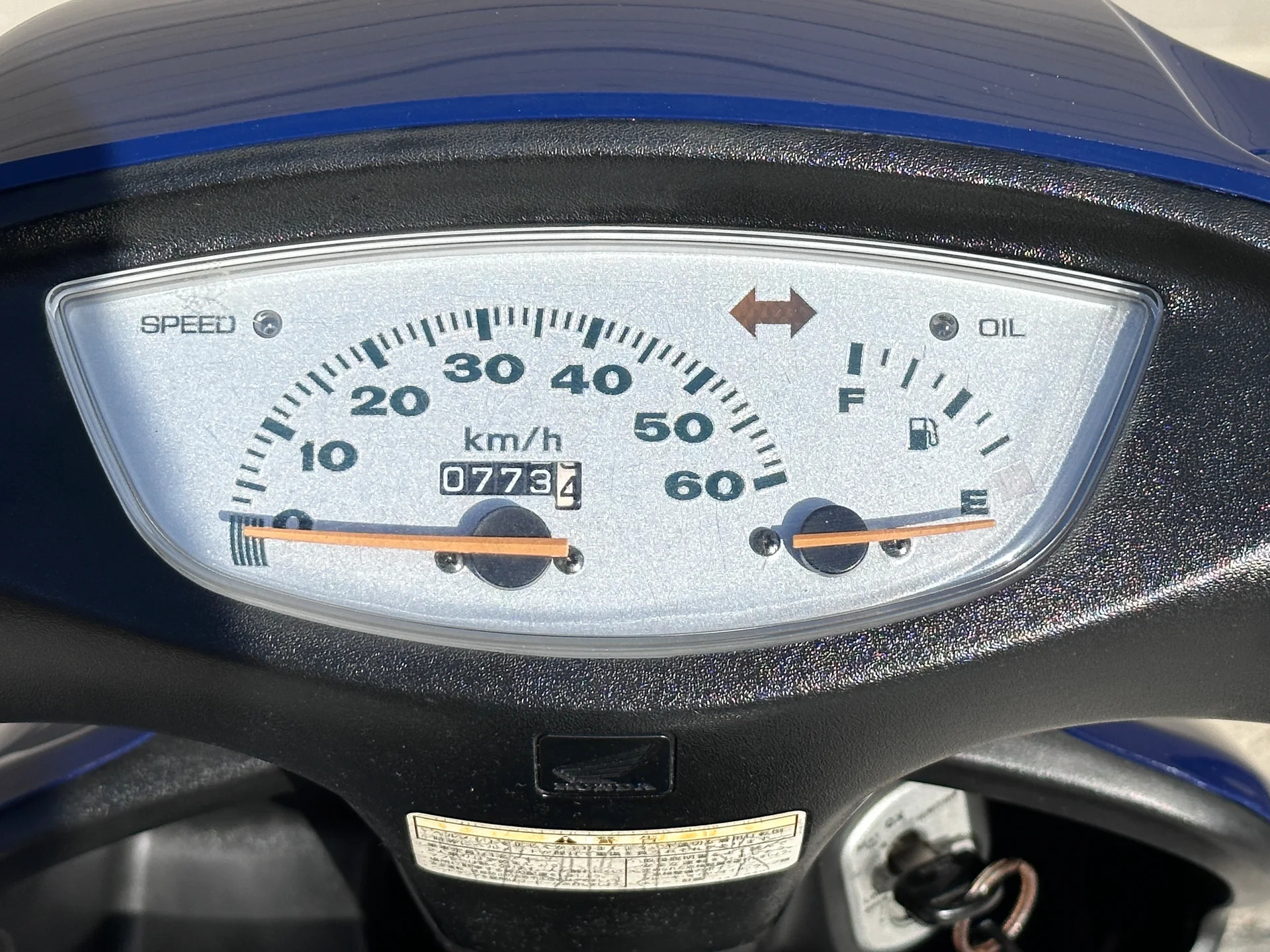
AF34 Display Panel

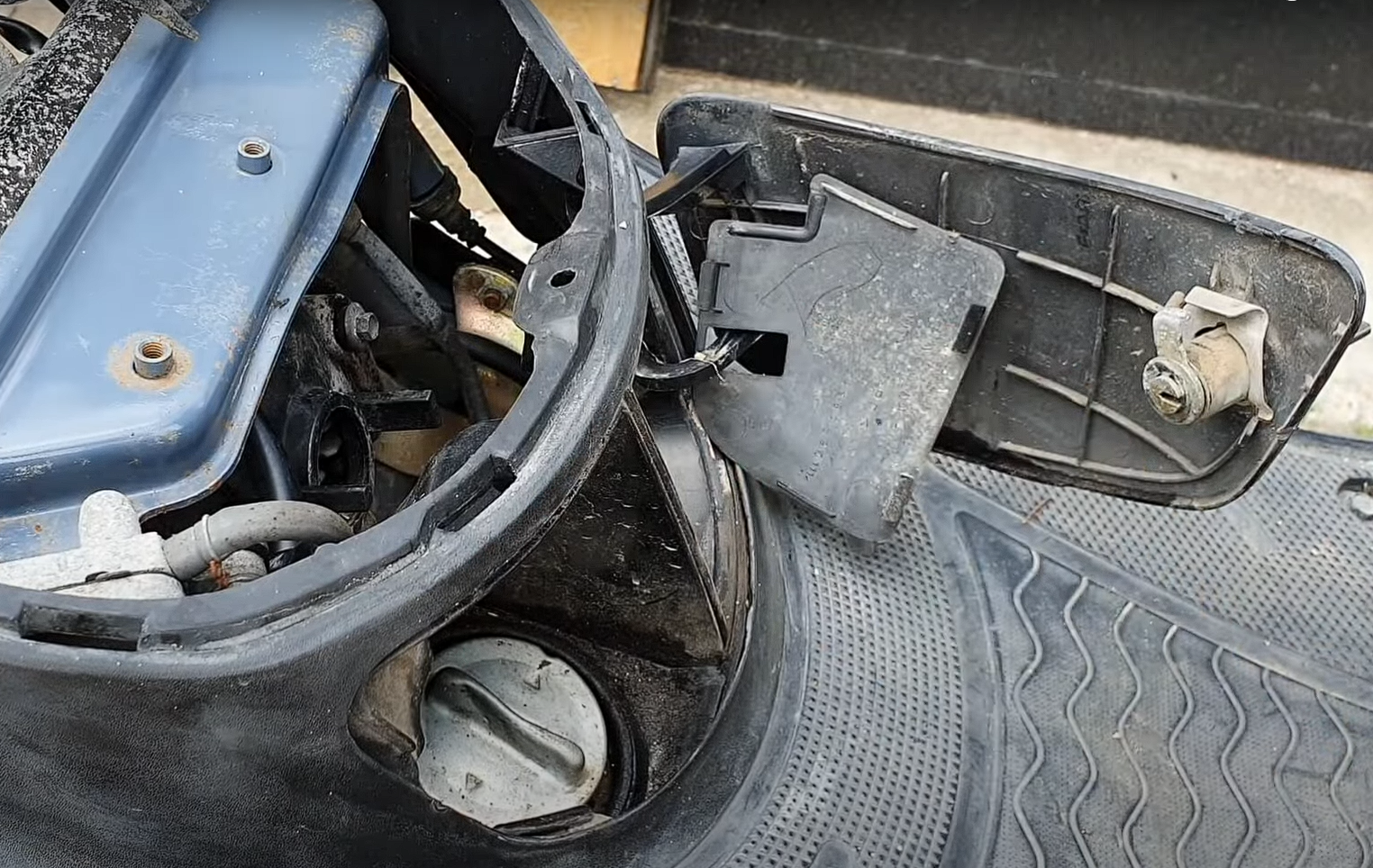
Fuel at the left, Spark Plug at the right

Honda Dio AF56 Series
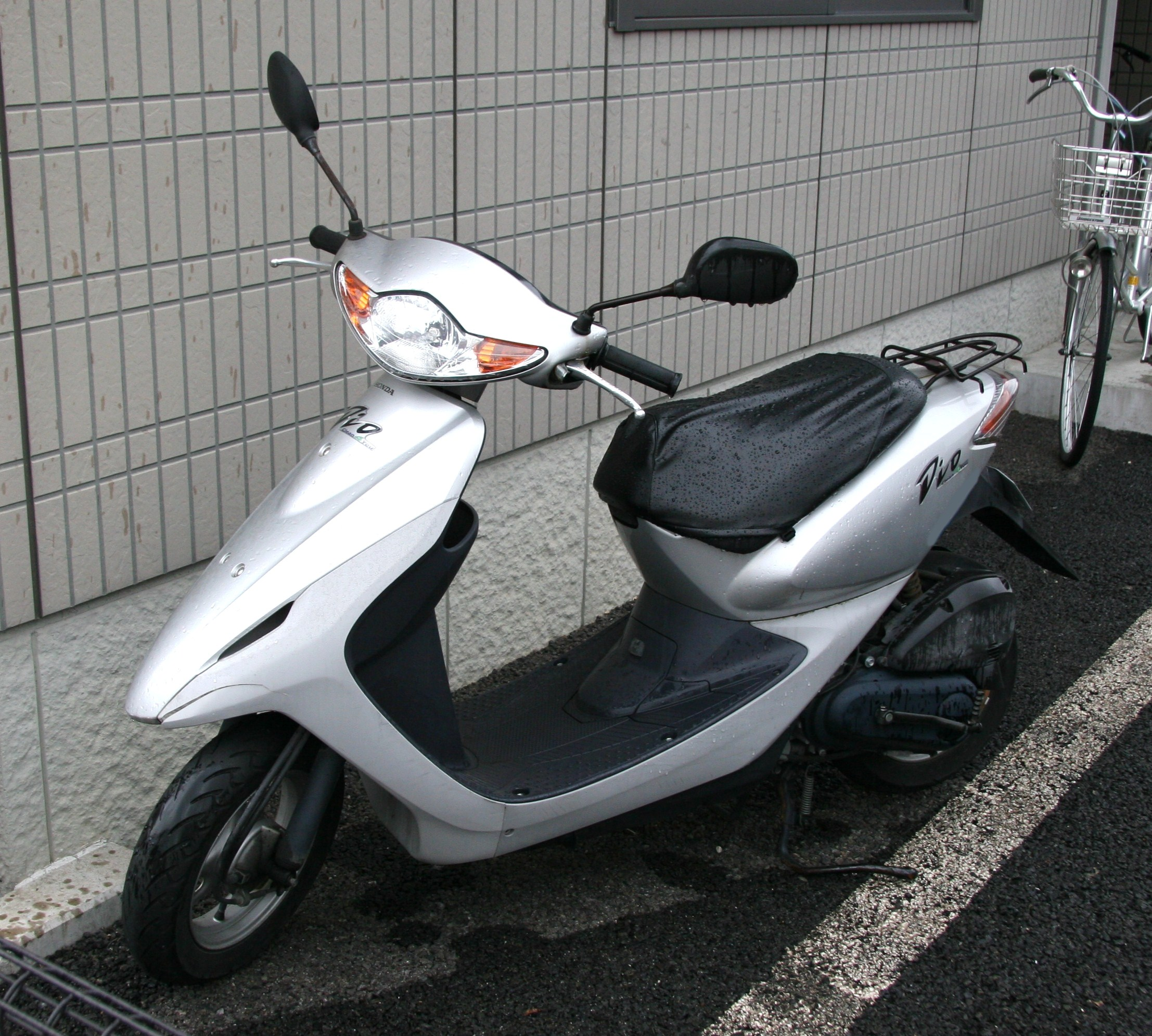
- 4th generation Dio
- Manufacturer: Honda
- Production: 2001-2003
- Assembly: China
- Class: Scooter
- Engine: 50 cc (3.1 cu in) (Four-stroke)
- Ignition type: Electric start
- Transmission: CVT Continuously Variable Transmission

The Honda Smart Dio (AF56 and AF57) was introduced in 2001 as the fourth generation of the Dio series. This model marked a major transition from the earlier two-stroke engines to a four-stroke 49 cc power unit developed to meet stricter emissions regulations.

The Smart Dio was powered by an air-cooled, four-stroke engine and retained a continuously variable transmission (CVT). Compared to the previous two-stroke models, the four-stroke configuration prioritised reduced emissions, improved fuel efficiency, and lower maintenance requirements, although with reduced peak power output.

Some variants of the Smart Dio were equipped with Honda’s PGM-FI (Programmed Fuel Injection) system, alongside electric starting as standard equipment. The AF57 variant formed part of this updated range and continued the transition toward cleaner and more environmentally compliant scooter designs.

The Smart Dio series represented a clear departure from the performance-oriented characteristics of earlier Dio models, focusing instead on practicality and regulatory compliance. Despite the reduction in performance, it maintained the compact dimensions and ease of use associated with the Dio line.

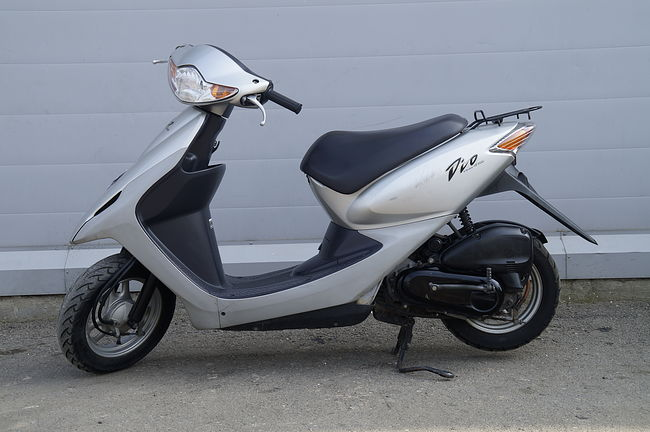
AF57 Side

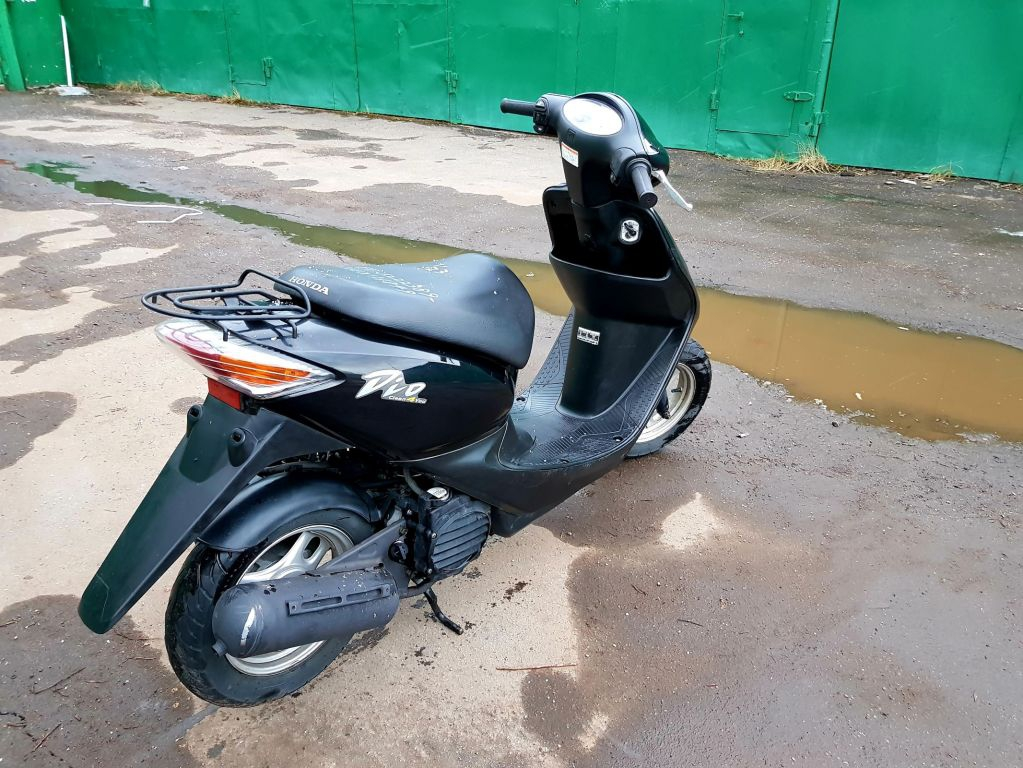
AF57 Rear

Honda Dio AF62 Series
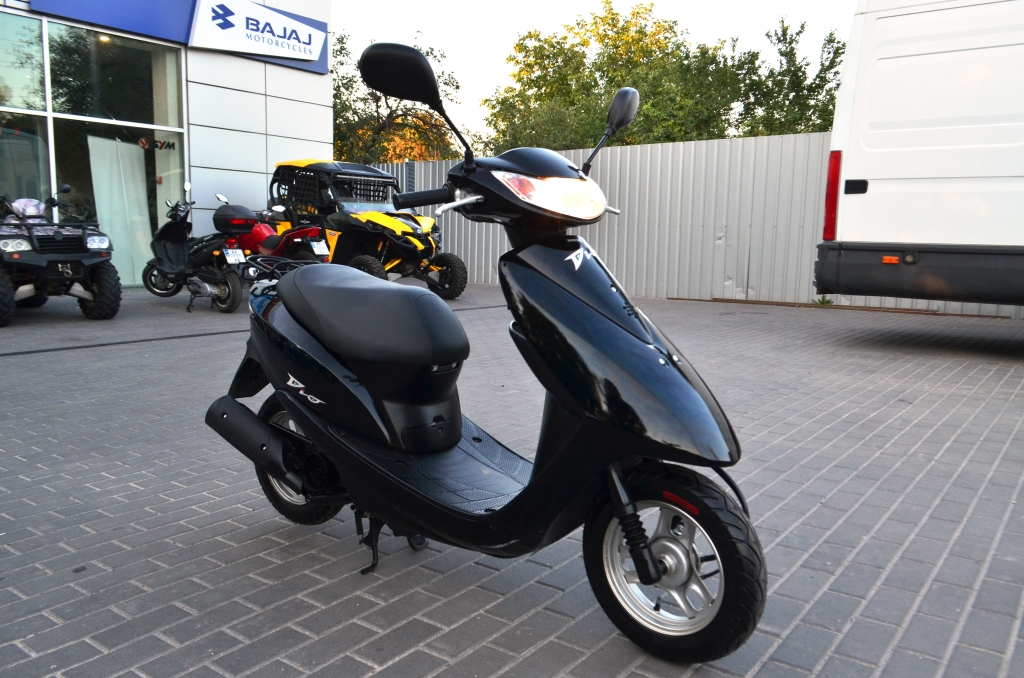
- 5th generation Dio
- Manufacturer: Honda
- Production: 2003-2010
- Assembly: China
- Class: Scooter
- Engine: 50 cc (3.1 cu in) (Four-stroke)
- Ignition type: Electric start
- Transmission: CVT Continuously Variable Transmission

The Honda Dio AF62 was introduced in 2003 as the next stage in the Dio lineup following the Smart Dio series. It continued the use of a 49 cc air-cooled four-stroke engine, building on the shift toward improved fuel efficiency and reduced emissions.

Compared to earlier models, the AF62 adopted a more conservative and commuter-oriented design. It featured simplified styling, an electric starter, and a continuously variable transmission (CVT). Drum brakes were used at both the front and rear. The model prioritised reliability, ease of use, and low operating costs over performance.

One notable variant was the Dio Cesta, which was mechanically based on the AF62 but designed for utility use. It featured a large front basket intended for carrying goods, making it suitable for urban delivery and shopping applications.

The AF62 represented a continuation of Honda’s focus on four-stroke 50 cc scooters, targeting everyday commuting needs in urban environments.

Aesthetically, the AF62 introduced a more modern and subdued look, replacing the aggressive and sporty designs of the Dio ZX era. The scooter was lightweight, simple, and practical, appealing primarily to commuters, students, and older riders in Japan's increasingly urbanized environment. It used drum brakes front and rear, featured an electric start, and was equipped with Honda's efficient CVT transmission.

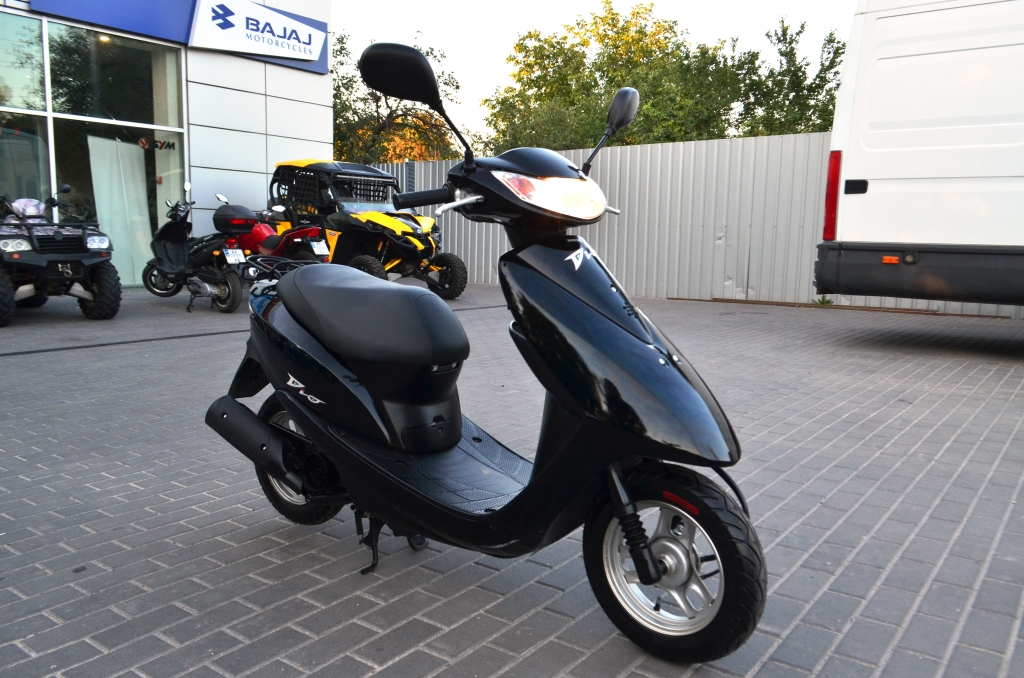
AF62 different from AF57

The Honda Dio AF63, also known as the Smart Dio Z4, was introduced as the final evolution of the AF-series Dio lineup. It was developed as an upgraded variant of the AF62 platform and incorporated several technical advancements over earlier models.

The AF63 was powered by a 49 cc, four-stroke engine equipped with Honda’s PGM-FI (Programmed Fuel Injection) system. Unlike earlier air-cooled models, the engine also featured liquid cooling, improving thermal stability and overall efficiency. These updates were intended to enhance fuel economy, throttle response, and cold-start performance while meeting increasingly strict emissions regulations.

In terms of design, the Smart Dio Z4 retained the general styling direction of the AF62 but added model-specific features such as revised instrumentation, alloy wheels, and optional front disc brake equipment depending on market specification.

The AF63 represented the most technologically advanced version of the AF-series Dio range. It marked the end of the long-running AF-series production line before the introduction of later Dio generations.

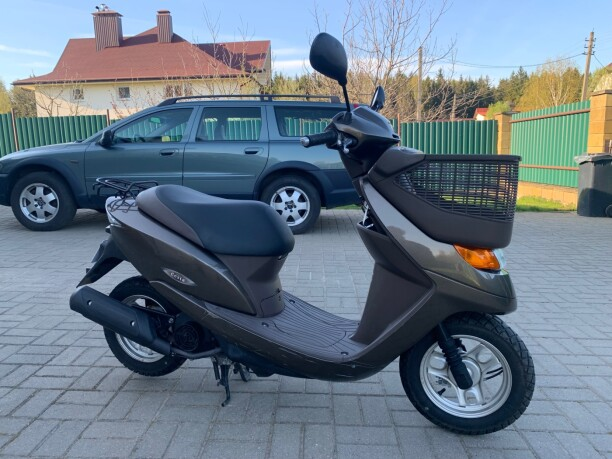
AF62 Cesta Side with front basket

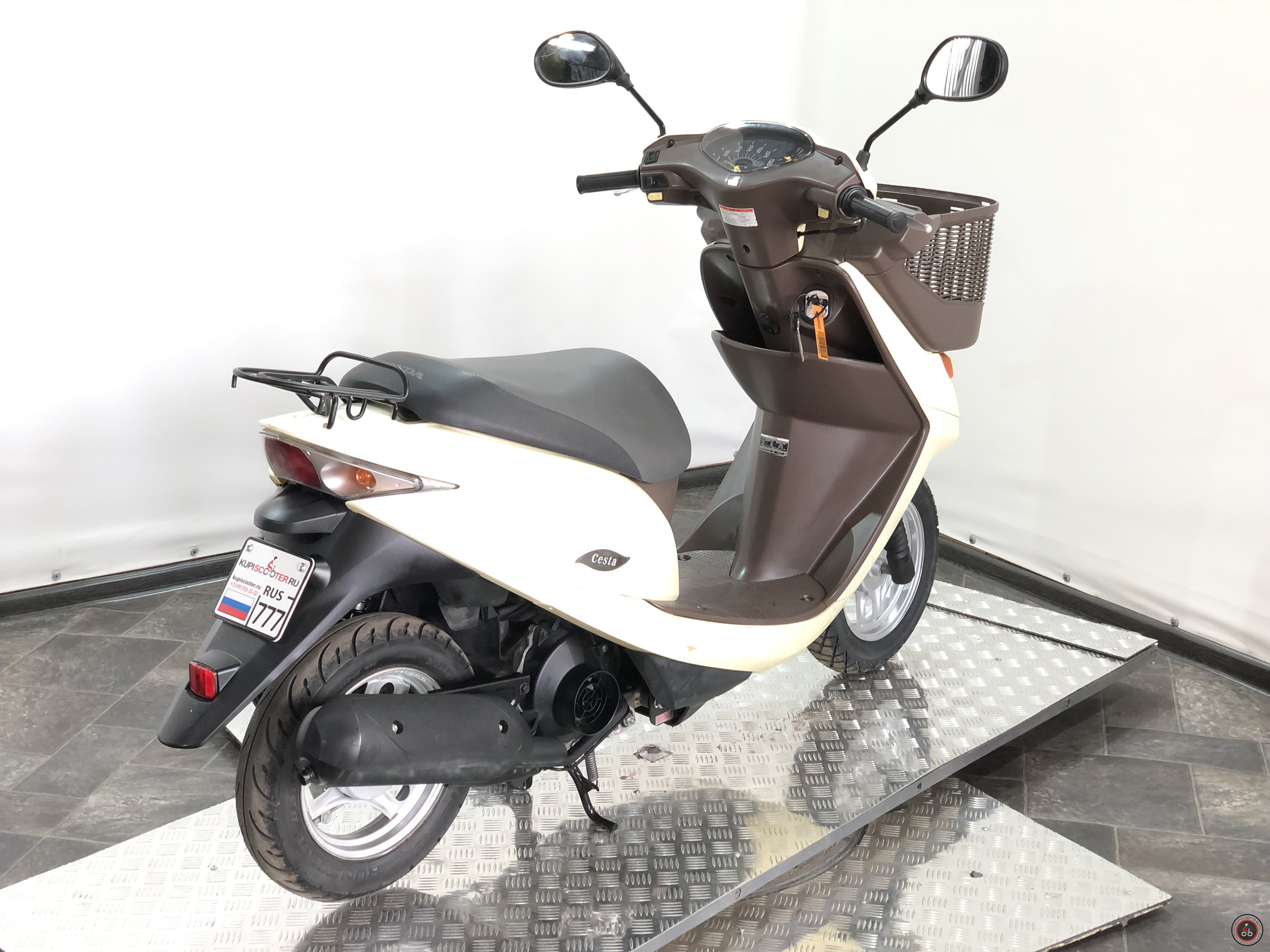
AF62 Cesta Rear
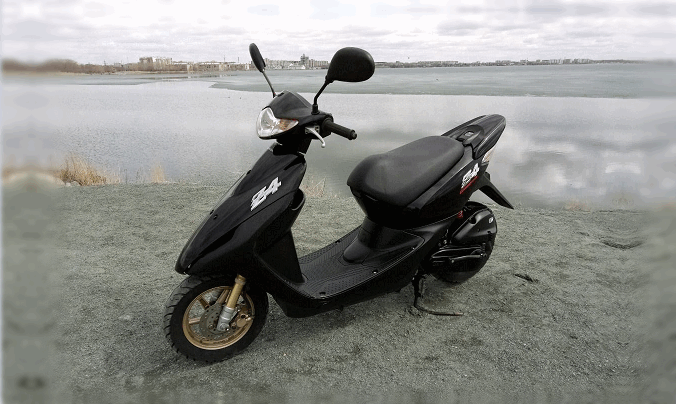
Same chassis as AF56/AF57 but with Z4 badge

== Canada model ==
The Canadian version of the Honda Dio was based on the AF27 Super Dio platform and was sold from 1992 to 2001. It was largely similar to the Japanese domestic market models, with several market-specific modifications to comply with local regulations and equipment requirements.

Differences included a sealed-beam headlight assembly, revised handlebar plastics, and modified rear lighting, including a different tail light and rear turn signal units. Canadian models were also equipped with unrestricted CDI units.

Most Canadian-market Dio scooters were base AF27 models, with a limited number of special edition colour variants. Some units were fitted with SR decals; however, these did not include the mechanical upgrades found on the Japanese Dio SR, such as a front disc brake.

The AF28 series, including the Dio SR and Dio ZX variants, was not officially sold in the Canadian market.

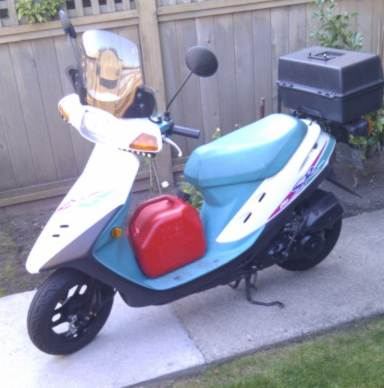
A 1996 Dio for Canadian market.

=== Engine Specification ===
==== AF18/AF28 ====
Engine Type 49cc, air-cooled, 2-stroke, single-cylinder / Bore × Stroke 39.0 mm × 41.4 mm / Compression Ratio 7.0:1 to 7.2:1 / Fueling Carburetor (Keihin) / Ignition CDI / Transmission CVT (V-Matic) / Cooling Forced air cooling / Top Speed 60–70 km/h (stock) / Power Output 6–7 hp (varies slightly by variant)

==== AF56/AF63 ====
Engine Type 49cc, 4-stroke, air-cooled, OHC, single-cylinder / Bore × Stroke 39.0 mm × 41.4 mm / Compression Ratio 10.1:1 to 10.5:1 (depends on model/year) / Fueling Carburetor (AF56, AF57) and PGM-FI (AF63, AF68) / Ignition CDI or ECU-controlled (FI models) / Max Power 4.1–4.5 PS at 8,000 rpm / Max Torque 3.9 Nm at 6,500 rpm / Transmission CVT (V-Matic) / Cooling System Forced air cooling / Fuel Consumption 80–90 km/L (claimed, under test conditions)

Emissions Standard Meets JP05 or post-2003 Japanese regulations

== NSC110 ==
In 2011, Honda introducing a 110 cc (NSC110) version of the long-awaited Dio in Japan. It is also manufactured in China. It is also available in Australia and New Zealand.

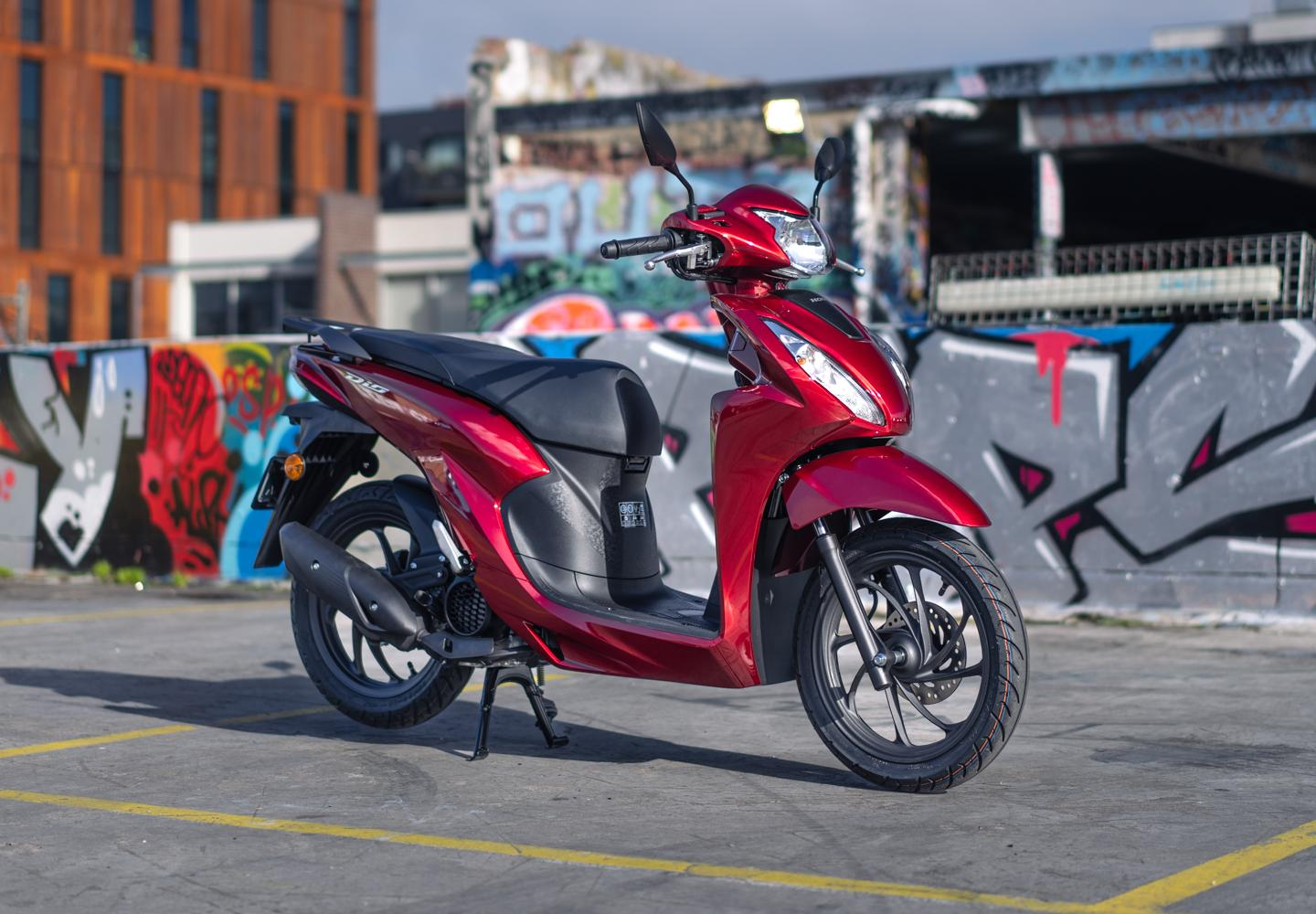
Exterior

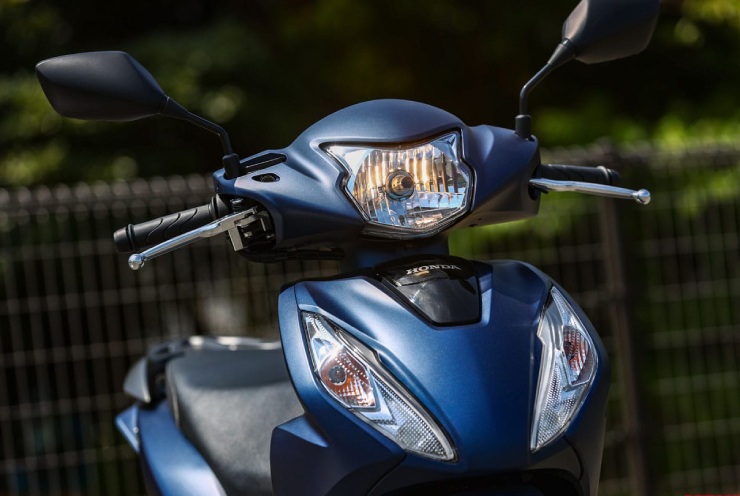
Equipped with Halogen Headlight

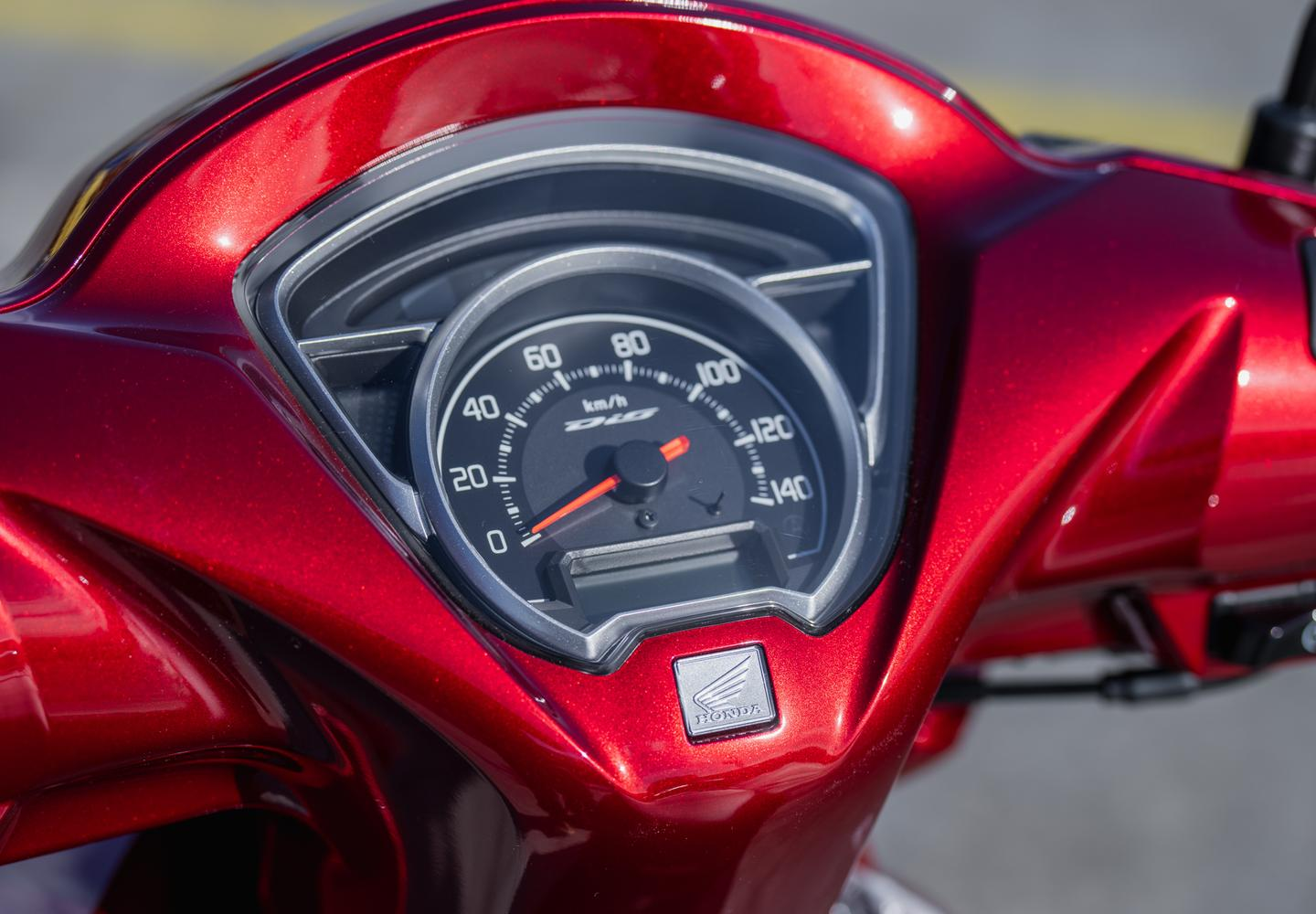
Display Panel

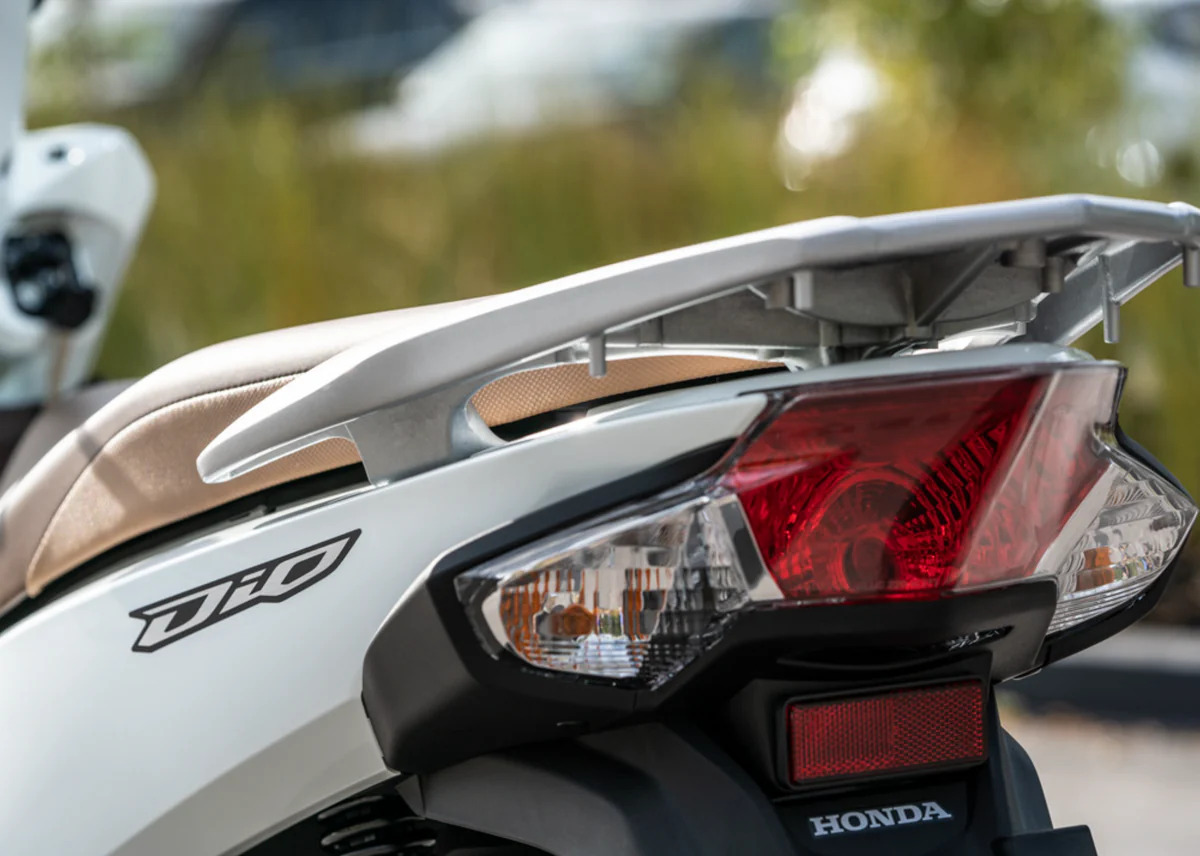
Rear

== Indian model ==
Honda Dio (India)
- Dio BS6 model
- Manufacturer: HMSI
- Also called: Honda Lead
- Parent company: Honda Motor Co., Ltd.
- Production: 2001–present
- Assembly: Narsapura, Karnataka, India
- Successor: Honda Dio STD/Deluxe (DLX)
- Class: Scooter
- Engine: 102 cc (6.2 cu in), OHC, four-stroke, air-cooled, single 110 cc (6.7 cu in), SOHC, four-stroke, air-cooled, single
- Bore / stroke: 50 mm × 55.6 mm (1.97 in × 2.19 in)
- Compression ratio: 9.5:1
- Top speed: 85 km/h (53 mph)
- Ignition type: Electric start
- Transmission: CVT
- Frame type: Underbone
- Suspension: Spring-loaded hydraulic type
- Brakes: Drum (130 mm (5.1 in)) with combined braking system (CBS)
- Tyres: Tubeless
- Rake, trail: 27˚30', 92 mm
- Wheelbase: 1,238 mm (48.7 in)
- Dimensions: L: 1,781 mm (70.1 in); W: 710 mm (28 in); H: 1,133 mm (44.6 in)
- Seat height: 765 mm (30.1 in)
- Weight: 105 kg (231 lb) (dry)
- Fuel capacity: 5.3 litres (1.2 imp gal; 1.4 US gal)
- Oil capacity: 0.7 litres (0.15 imp gal; 0.18 US gal)
- Fuel consumption: 60 km/L (170 mpg_{‑imp}; 140 mpg_{‑US})

The Honda Dio is an Indian scooter manufactured by Honda Motorcycle and Scooter India. It is being built at the plant in Narsapura, Karnataka. It was introduced in 2001 and has crossed 30 lakh sales milestone in 2019. Aside from the domestic market, the Dio is exported to Nepal, Bangladesh, Sri Lanka, Latin America and Malaysia. A rebadged version is sold as the Honda Lead in the European market.

Original model was launched in 2001, model name SCV100, was equipped with a 102 cc (6.2 cu in) air-cooled, four-stroke, 8V (8 valve), OHC engine with both electric self-start and kick start. This version has a 6-litre (1.3 imp gal; 1.6 US gal) fuel tank, of which one litre is reserve.

In 2012, HMSI launched a new Dio, SCV110, at Auto Expo in India. It has a new 110 cc (6.7 cu in) engine, which also runs Honda's Activa and Aviator. It also has a new look and new headlight.

The 2013 Dio had claimed improvements in fuel efficiency and combined brakes.

In 2017, Honda launched the revamped version of the Dio, complying with Bharat Standard – IV (BS-IV) Emission regulations, featuring a redesigned speedometer design, along with the inclusion of an LED headlight. Later in 2018, Honda launched the Dio Deluxe, featuring digital speedometer and power seats, while retaining the look of the 2017 model.

In 2020, Honda launched an all-new revamped version of the Dio, complying with Bharat Standard – VI (BS-VI) Emission regulations and with the addition of programmed fuel-injection system. Telescopic shock absorbers were introduced in this model. The top-of-the-line Dio Deluxe (introduced in 2018) has been retained with redesigned full digital speedometer and power seats. A Repsol Edition based on the Dio Deluxe was introduced in November 2020.

In 2023, Honda introduced a new 125cc version of the Dio based on the Grazia 125 (not to be confused with a Chinese Dio 125) in contrast to the regular Dio. It is powered by the same 125cc engine from the Activa 125 and other Indian scooters from Honda.

=== Trims ===
==== STD ====
The Standard (STD) is a base model of the Dio. It features an analogue instrument panel with a speedometer. It features a halogen headlights, making a much look appearance. An LED (light-emitting diode) option is now standard in 2017 for the BS-IV Dio.

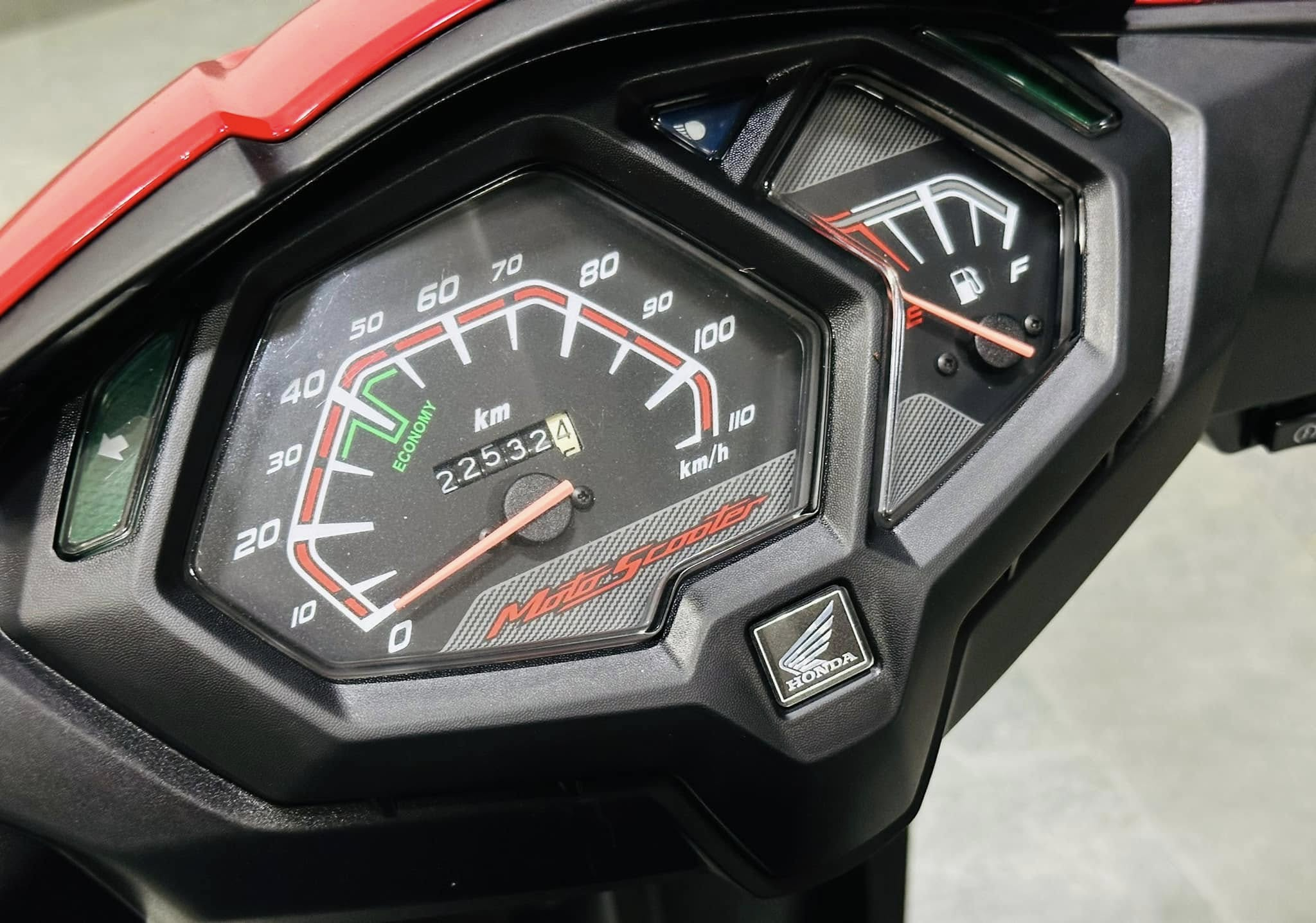
Analog panel

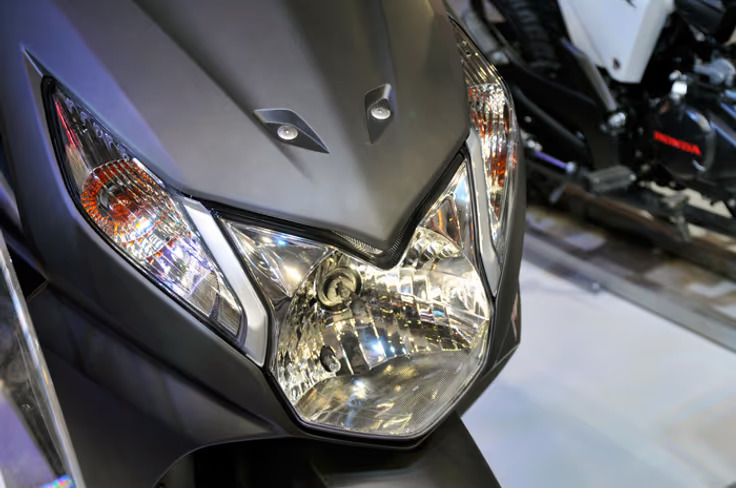
Halogen light before LED became standard in 2017

==== DLX ====
The Deluxe (DX or DLX) is a premium, top-of-the-line model of the Dio. It features a first-segment fully digital instrument panel, as well as projector headlights, and an optional power seats.

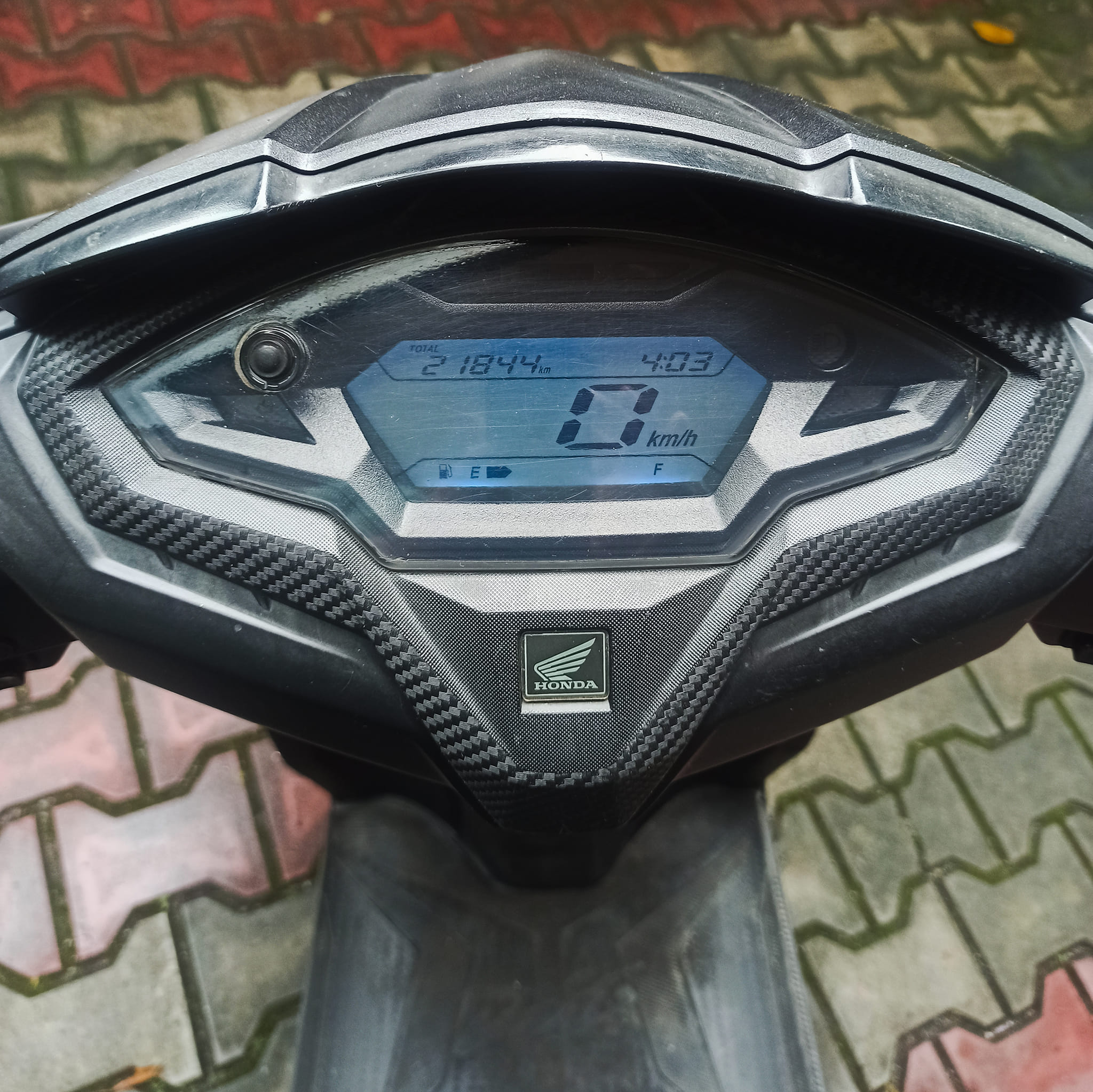
Digital panel

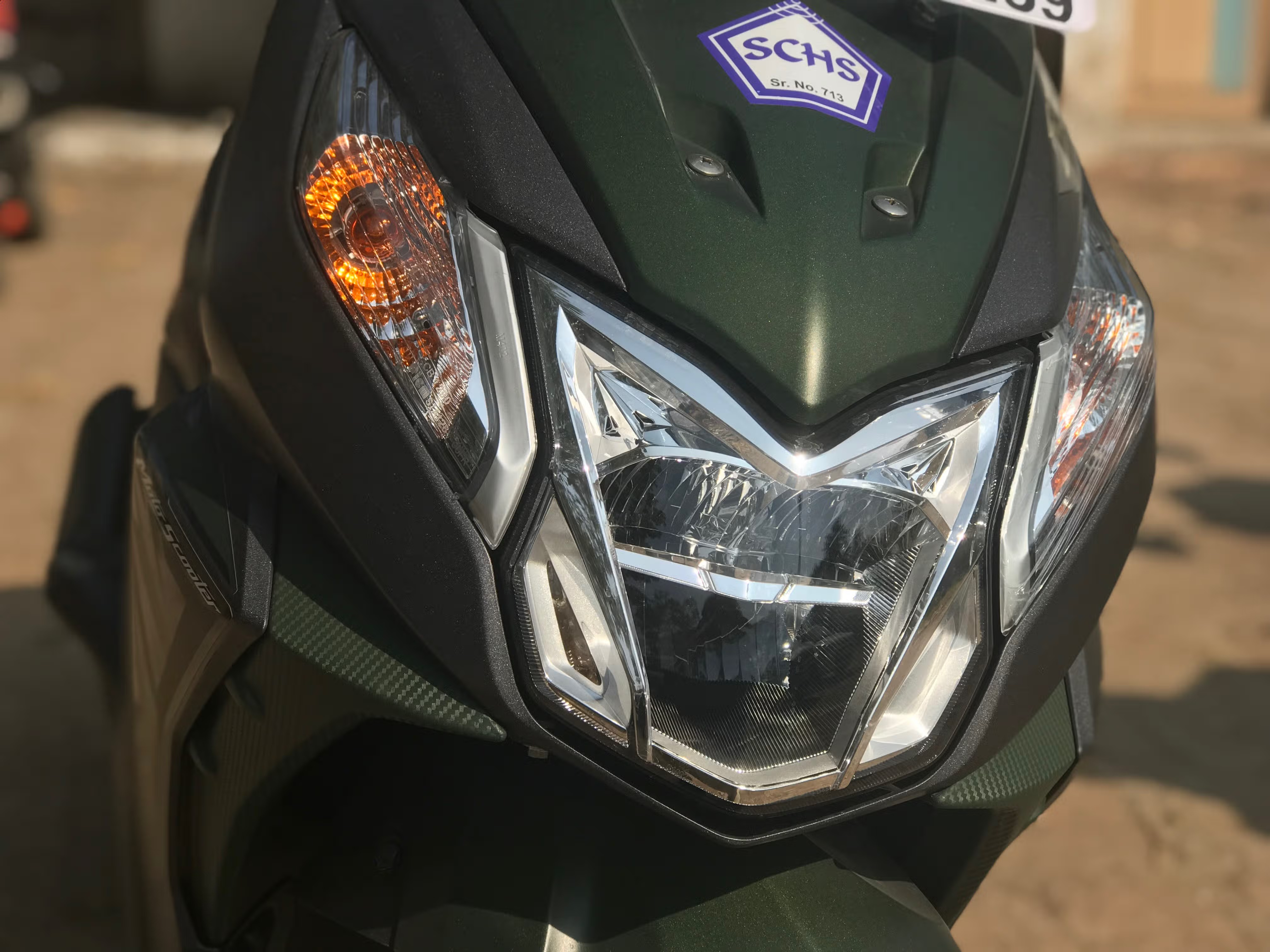
LED headlight

==== Repsol Edition ====
The Repsol Edition is a special edition model released exclusively to the Indian market and is based on the Dio Deluxe trim level. It also is a nod to Repsol Honda's 800 victories of MotoGP, most notably reigning six-time champion Marc Márquez. Changes included in a tri-color paint scheme (a combination of red, white, and orange), the Repsol logo is displayed in, and for the first time, an alloy rims which replaced the steel rims found in both existing models.

Dio exhaust note
Honda Dio exhaust note

== Awards ==
- Scooter of the year 2003 (BBC)

== Gallery ==
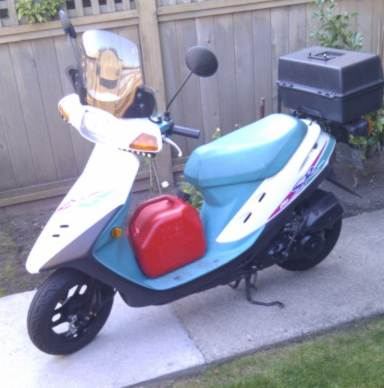
A 1996 Dio for Canadian market.

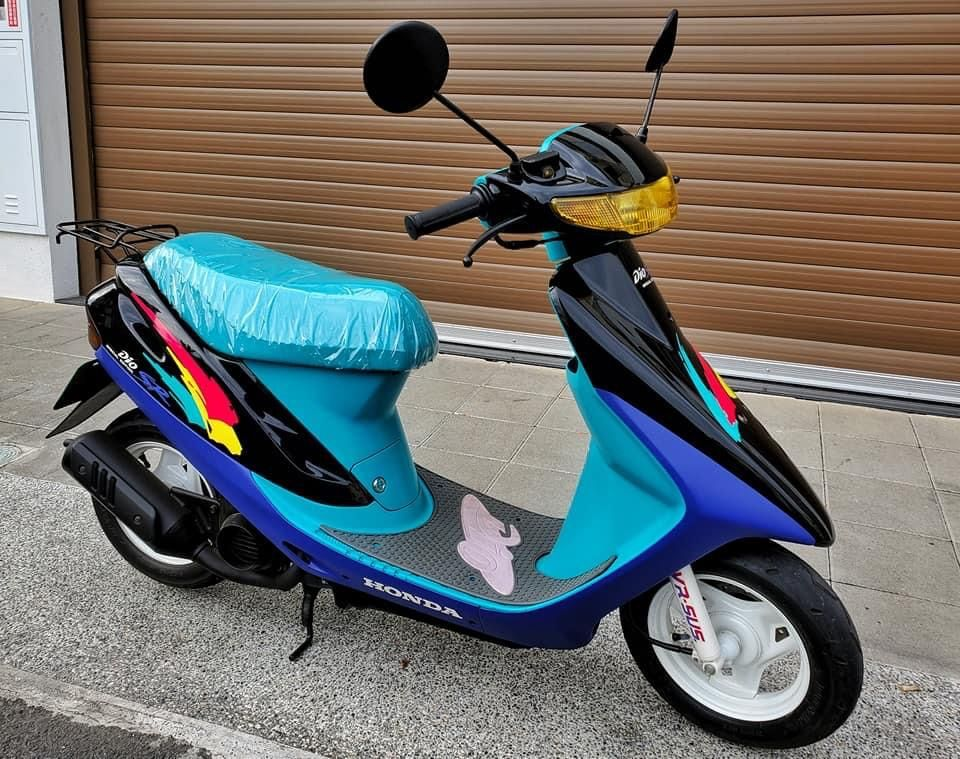
Dio SR AF28

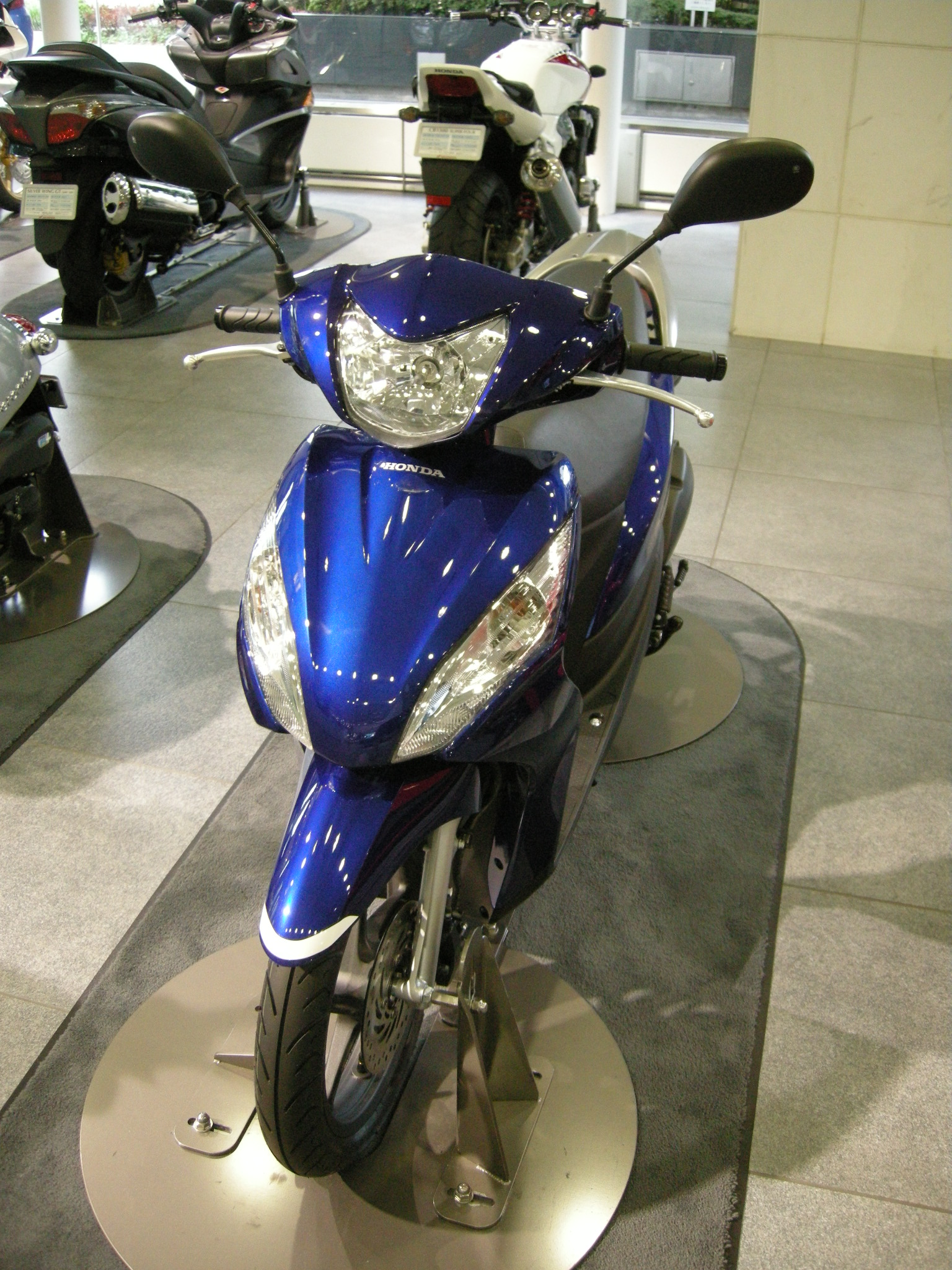
Dio 110 (NSC110)

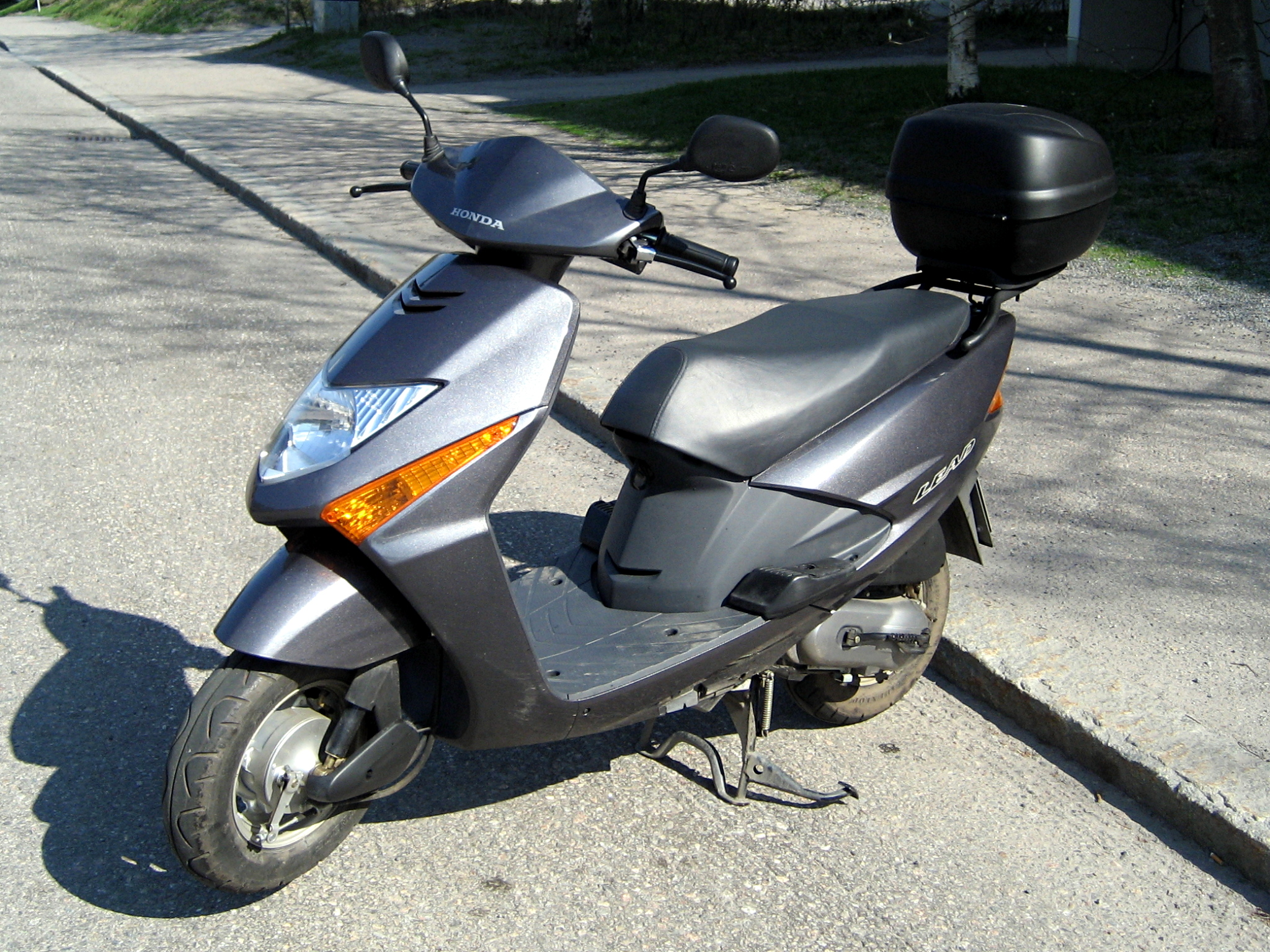
Dio was rebadged as Lead for the European market.

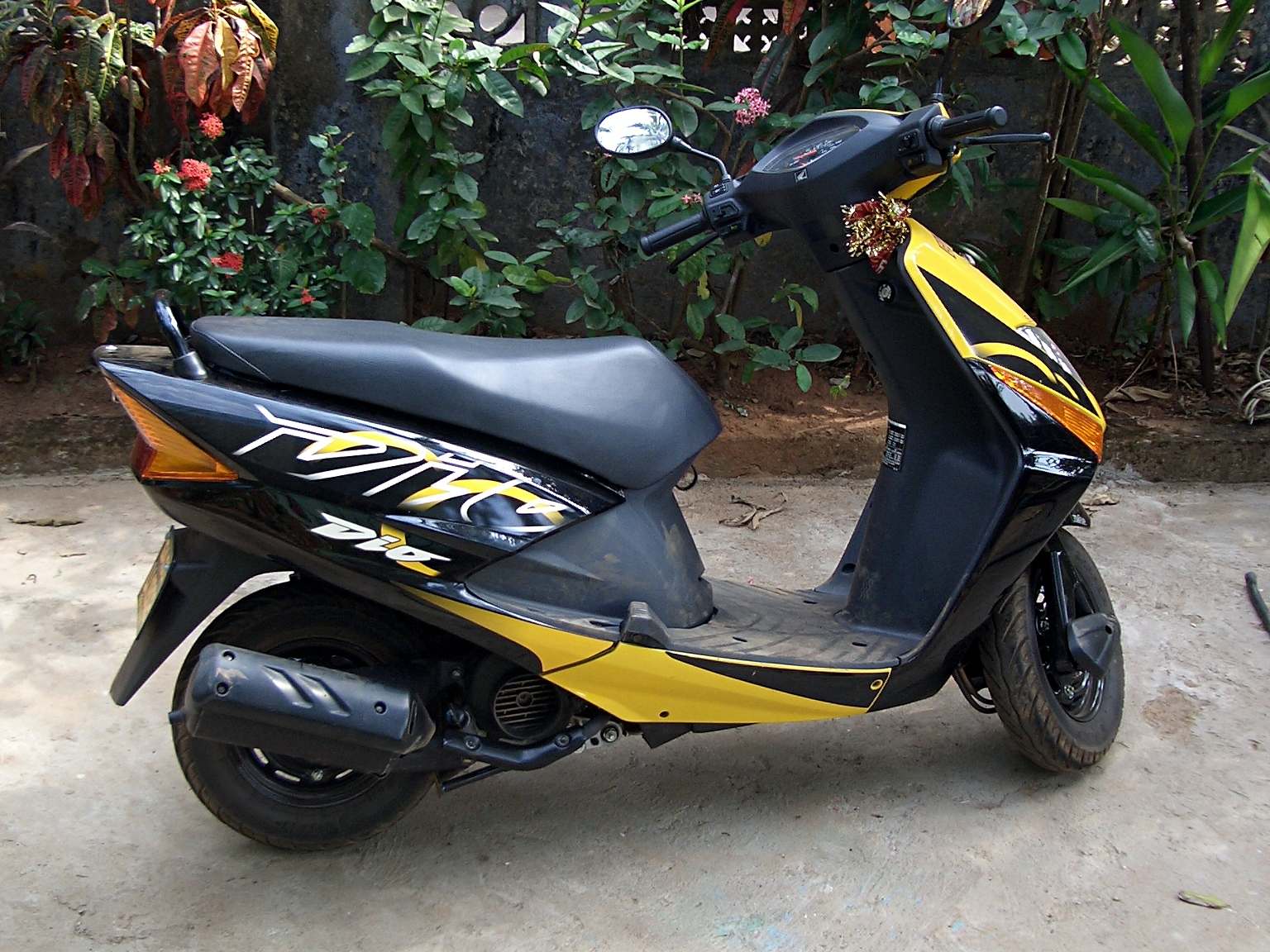
2007 version of Dio in Indian market.

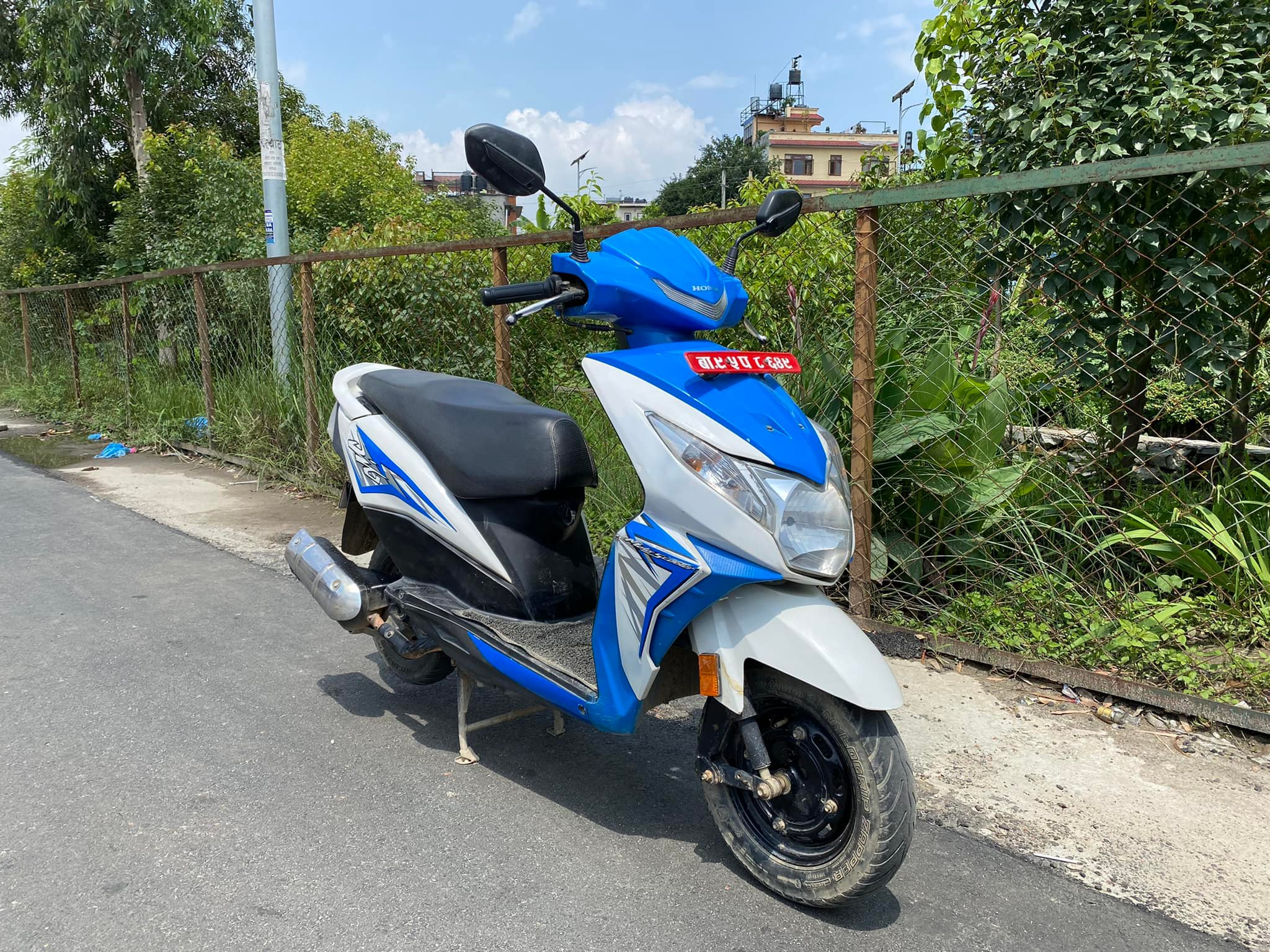
2017 Dio BS-IV in Indian market.

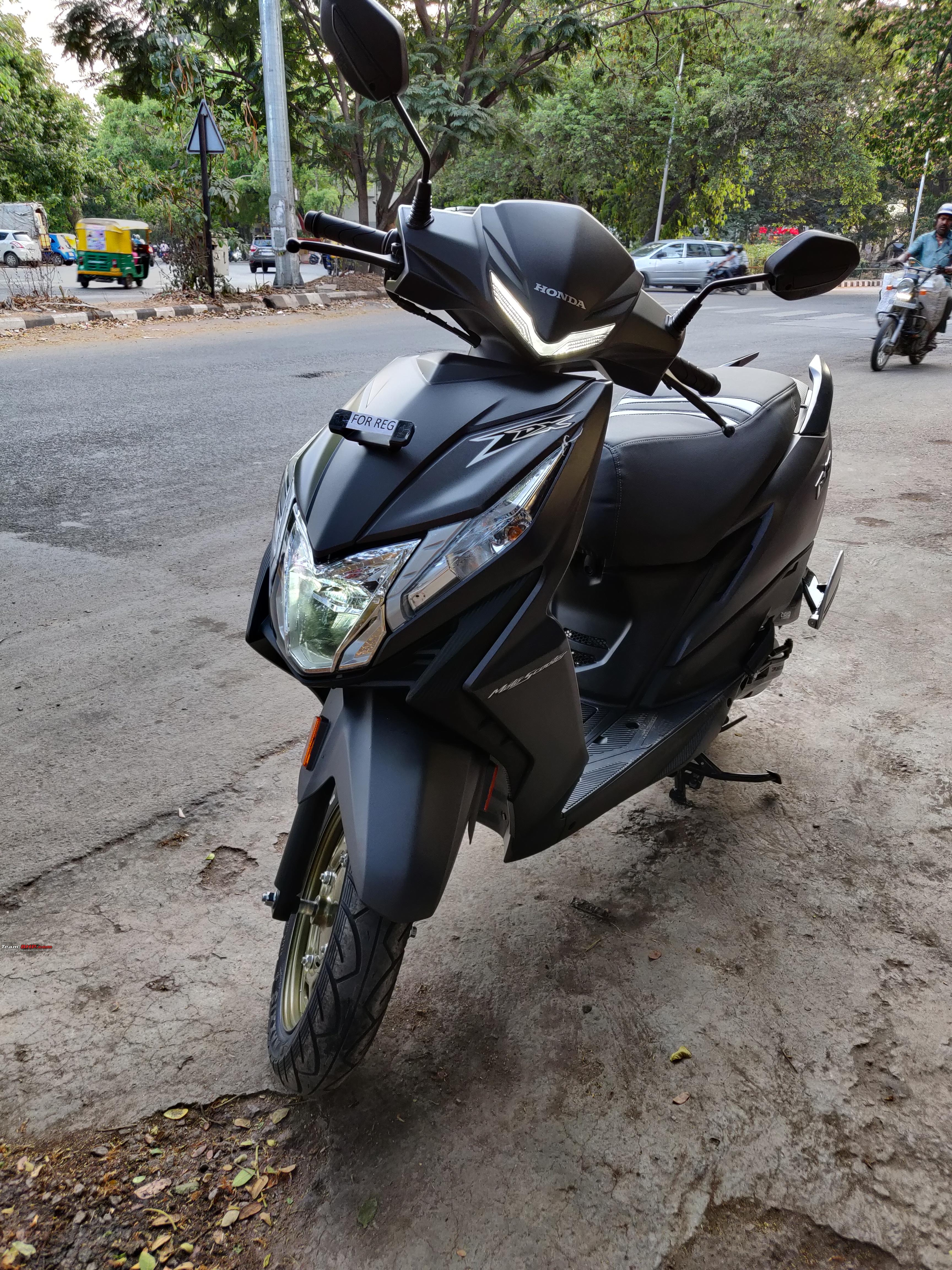
2020 Dio BS-VI in Indian market.

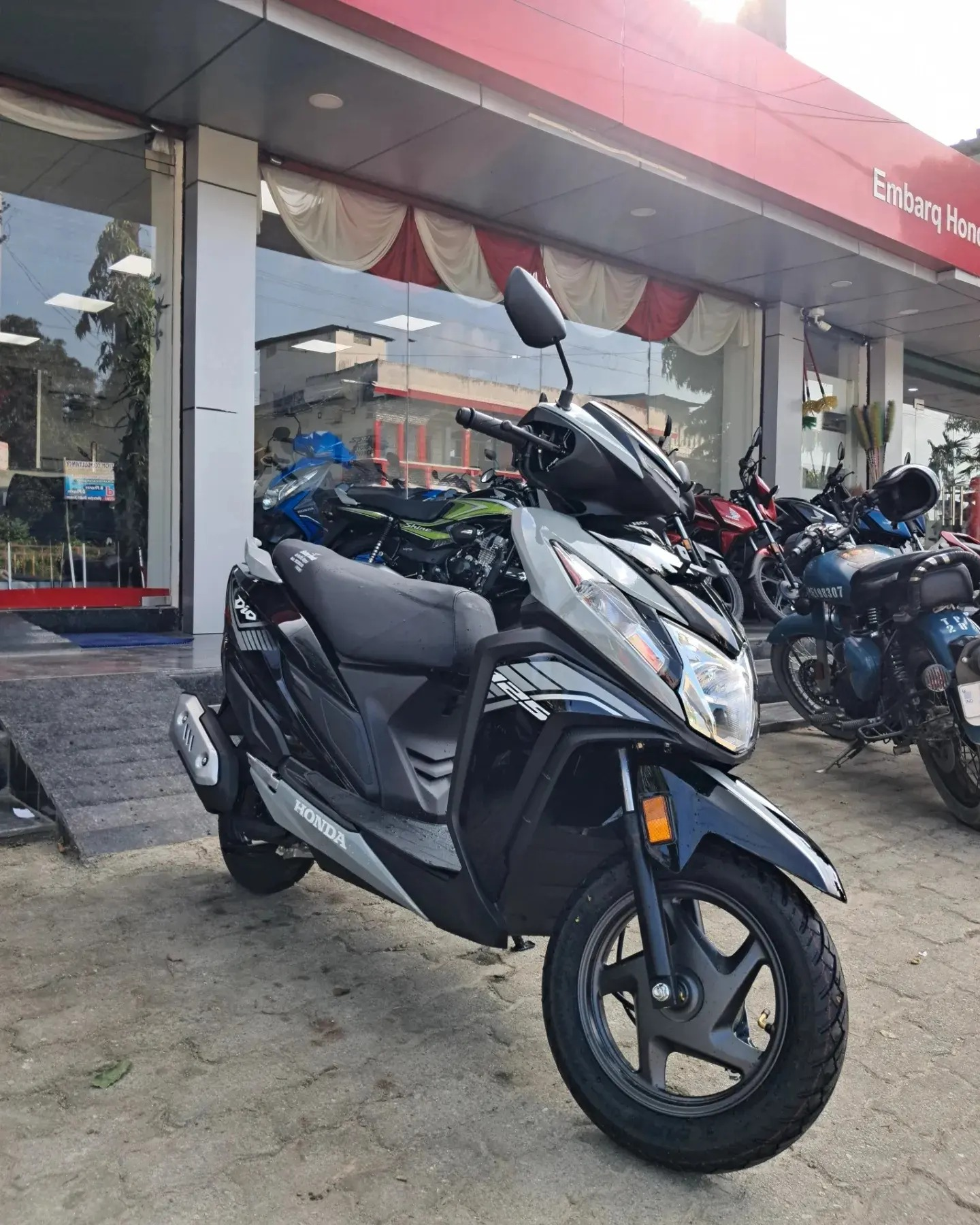
2023 Dio BS-VI with 125cc in Indian market.
