= Public transport planning =

Public transport planning or transit planning is the spatial planning professional discipline responsible for developing public transport systems. It is a hybrid discipline involving aspects of transport engineering and traditional urban planning. Indeed, many transit planners find themselves involved in discourse with urban-land-use issues such as transit-oriented development.

Transit planners are responsible for developing routes and networks of routes for urban transit systems. These may follow one or more models depending on the character of the communities they serve. For example, in urban areas, a system may attract enough ridership to support high frequencies of service. At these high frequencies, services can operate at demand service levels where the specific frequency of service in each corridor can be independent and where transfers can reasonably occur at random. In less densely developed areas service may operate somewhat infrequently. To optimize the quality of trips for customers, some systems compensate by operating a timed-transfer system. In this model, routes are designed to bring buses (or trains or ferries) together at a central location at predetermined times. Customers then transfer between the vehicles which leave a few minutes later. In systems committed to this system, routes are designed to take travel time into account.

In addition to serving customers' transportation needs, transit planners often consider transportation projects' other impacts. Economic impacts, directly on providers and consumers, on local economies, and on the aggregate level in large economic spheres, often feature prominently in deciding between different projects. In recent decades, concerns about environmental quality have produced a growing interest in developing sustainable transportation and transit planning has evolved to reflect these new concerns. Similarly, impacts on social equity have been paid increasing attention by transit planners in recent years.

Karel Martens has suggested a new paradigm for transportation planning through Transport Justice, a philosophical-ethical approach. In this approach he critiques conventional performance oriented metrics in transport planning and proposes a justice based model grounded in the sufficiency principle, aimed at securing a minimum accessibility threshold for all individuals.
