= Electric vehicle =

Vehicle propelled fully or mostly by electricity

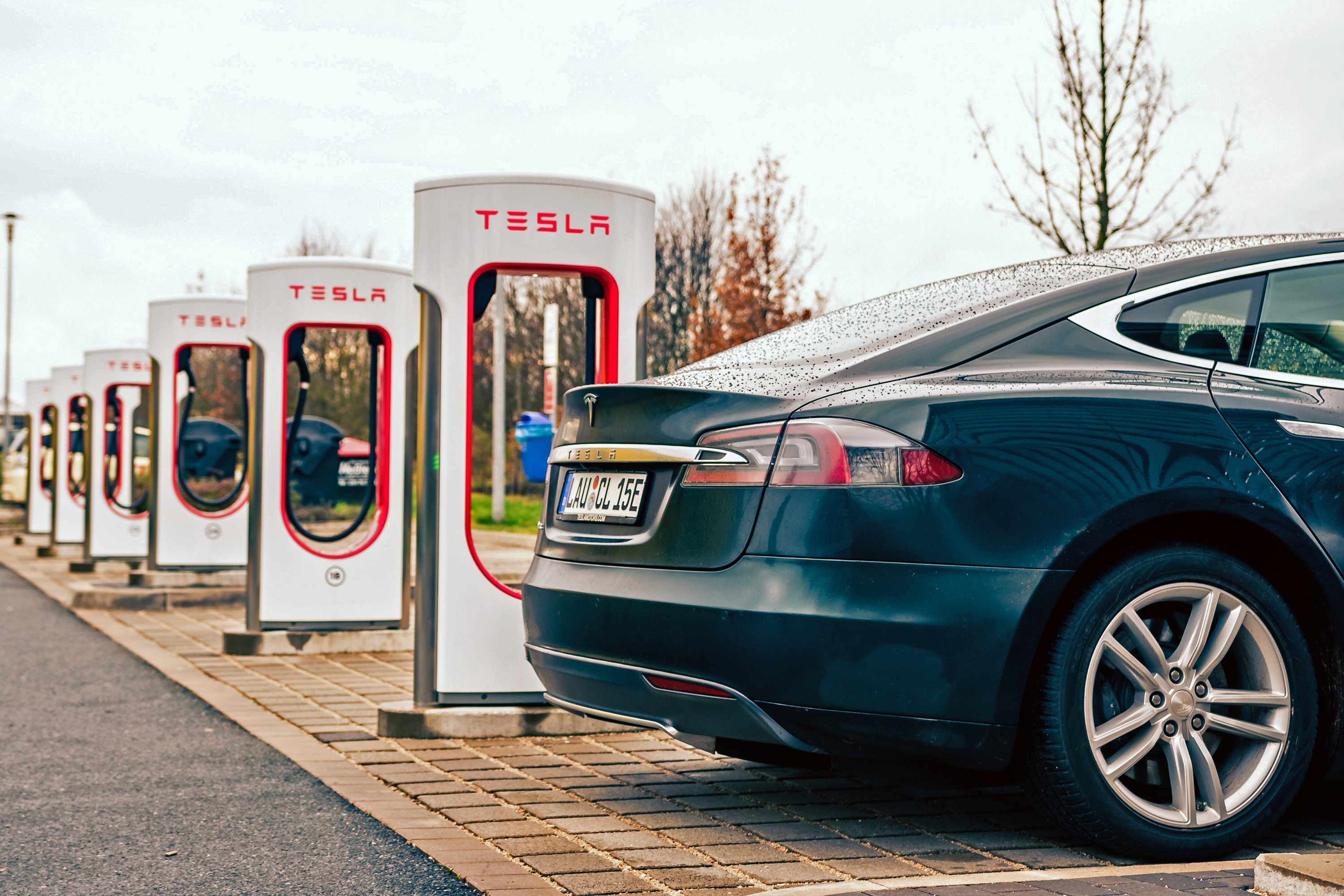
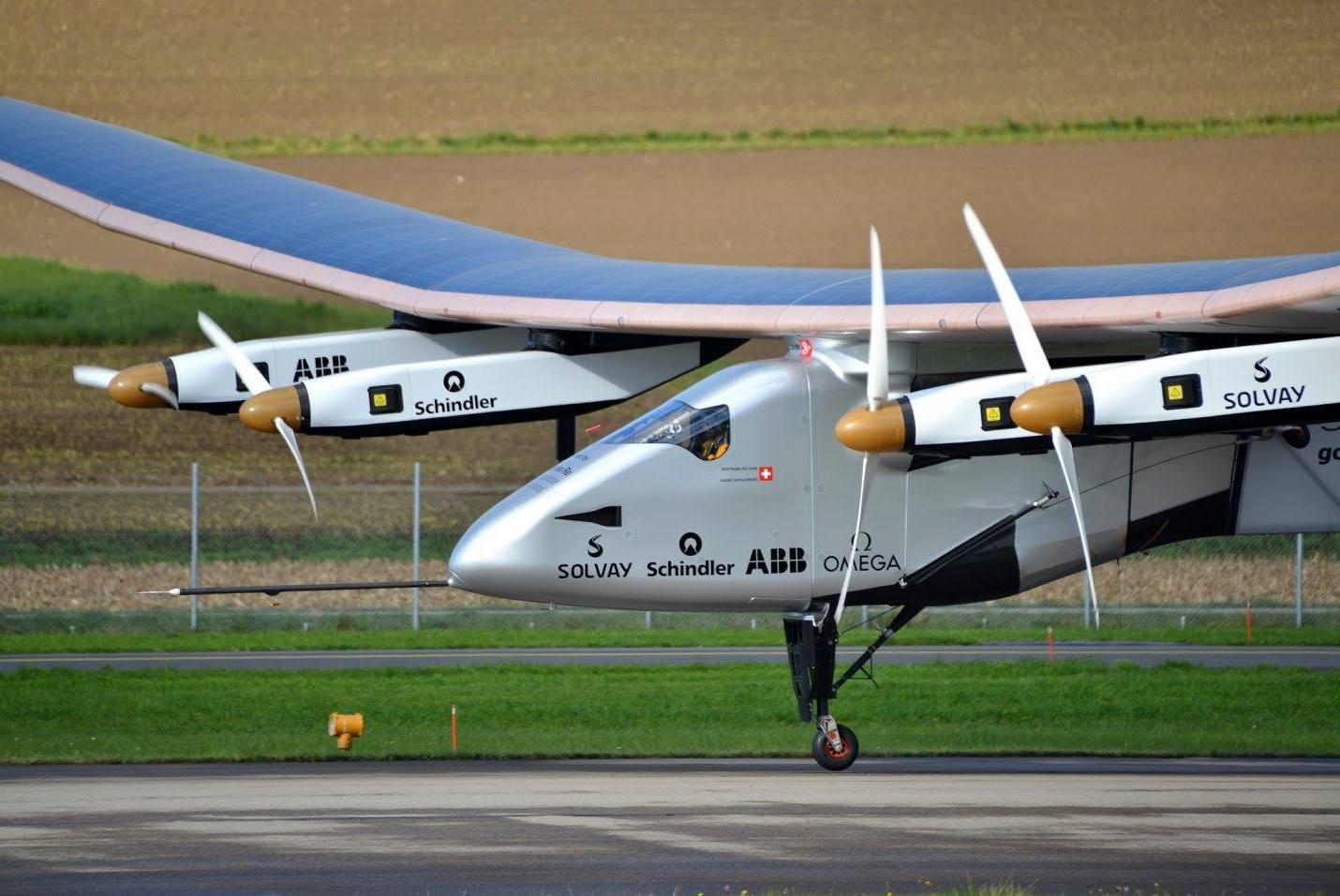
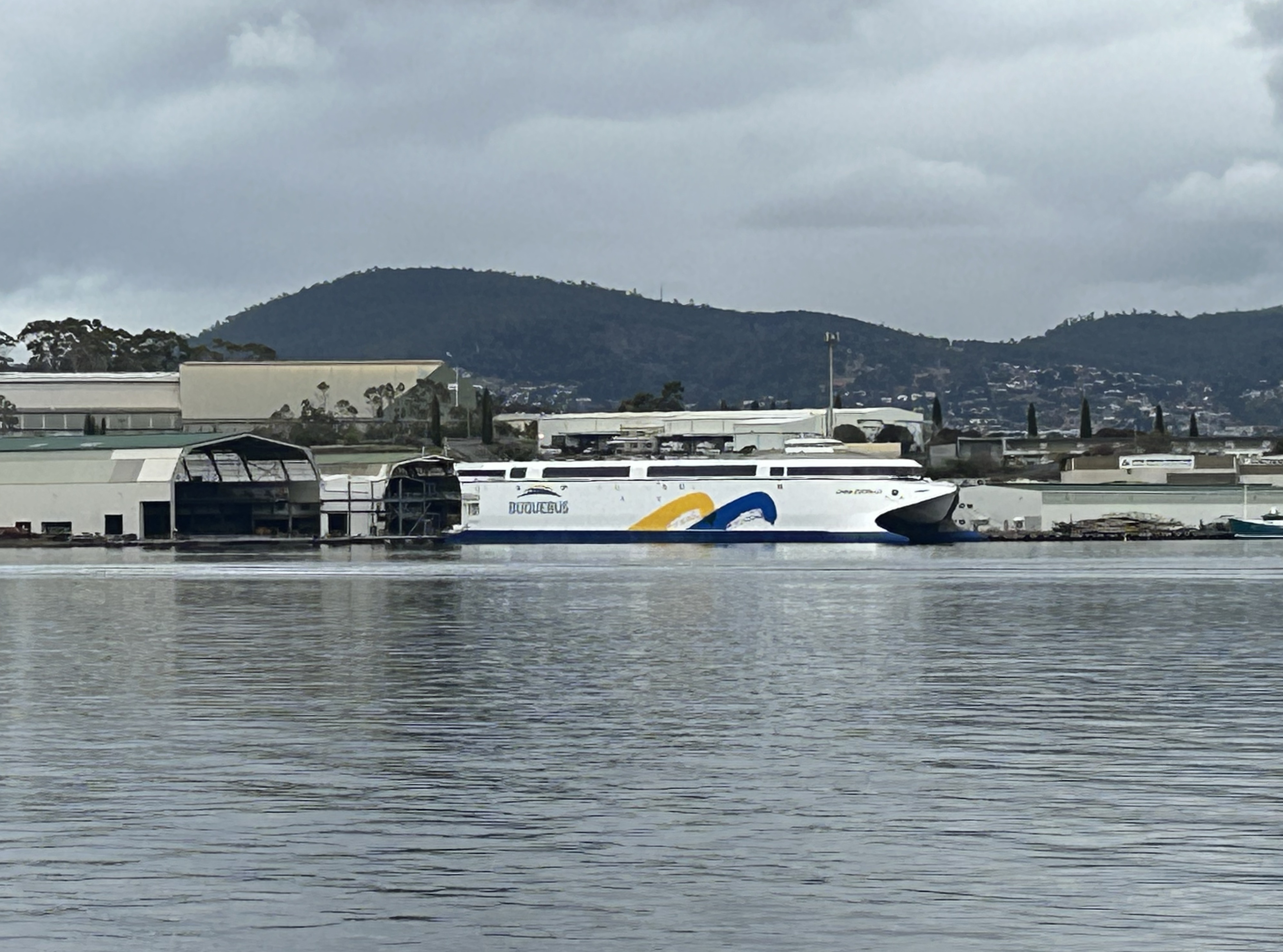
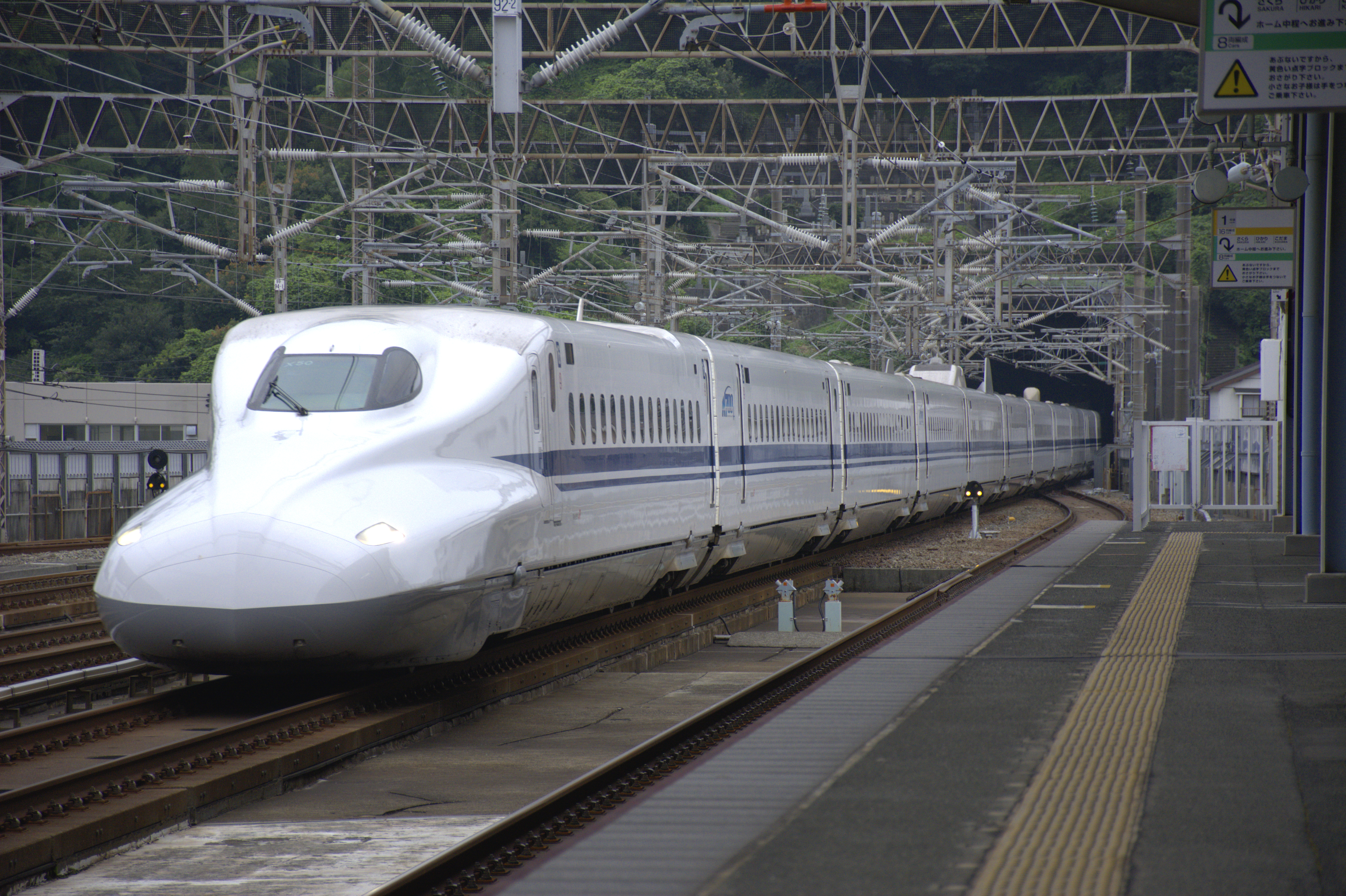
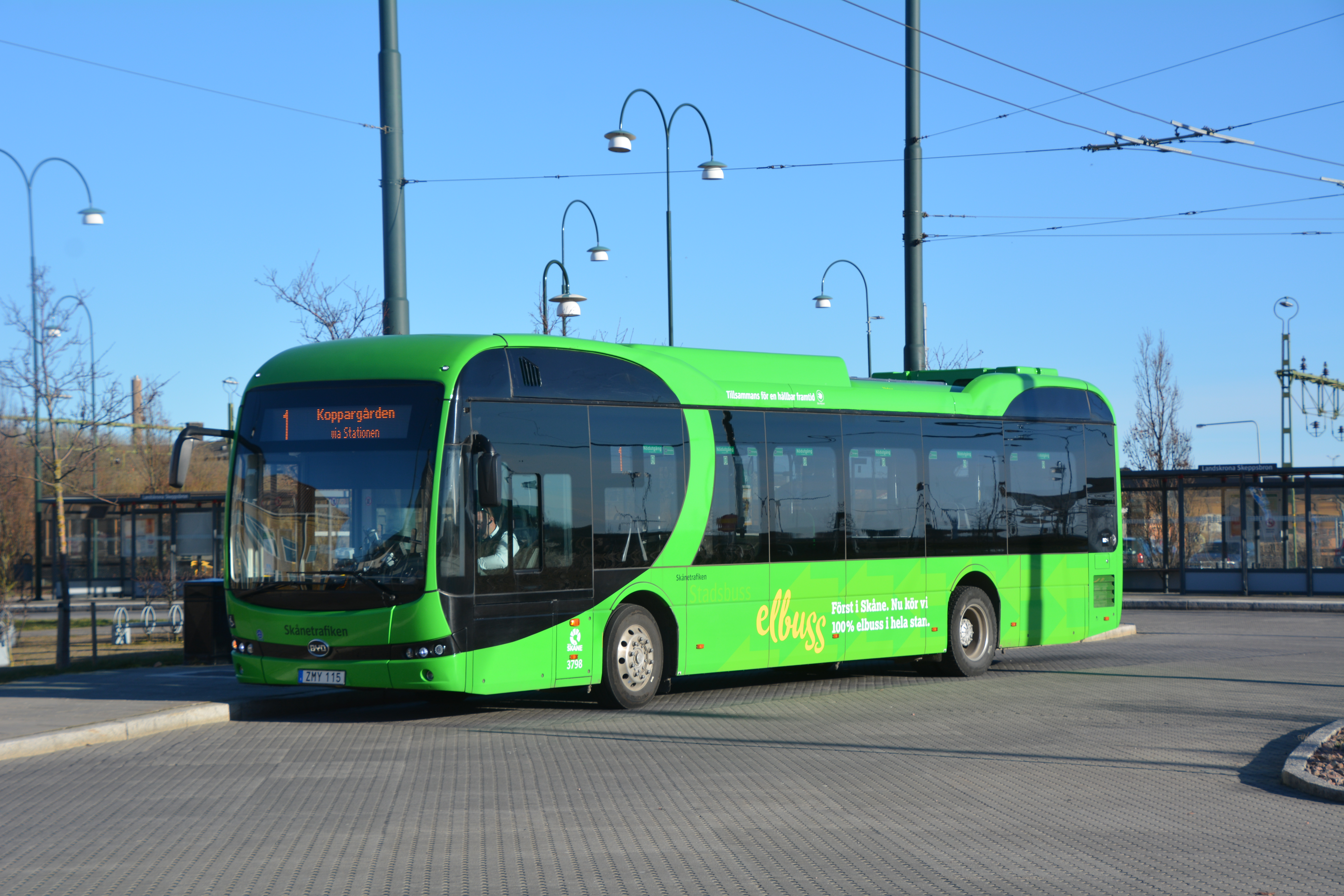
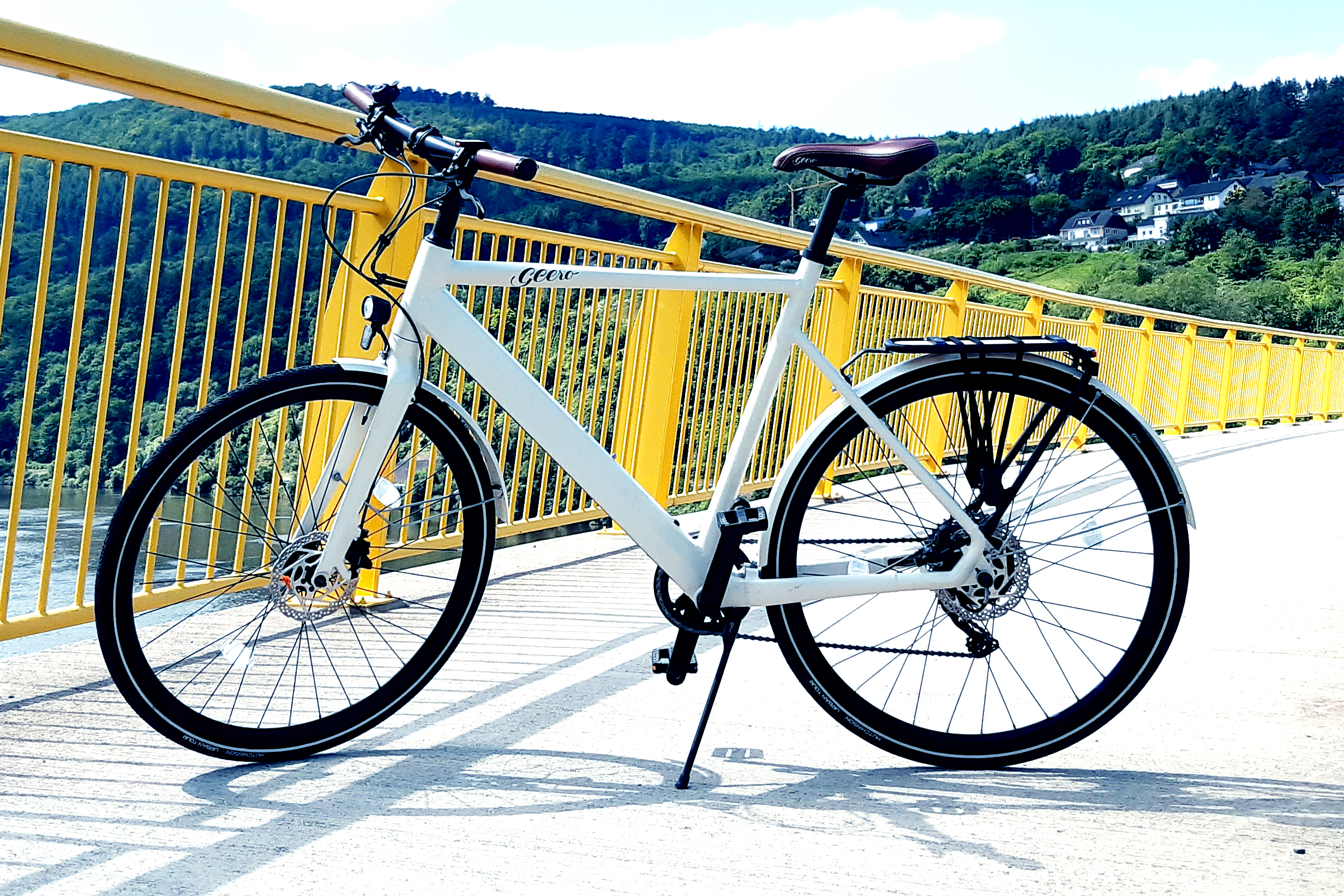
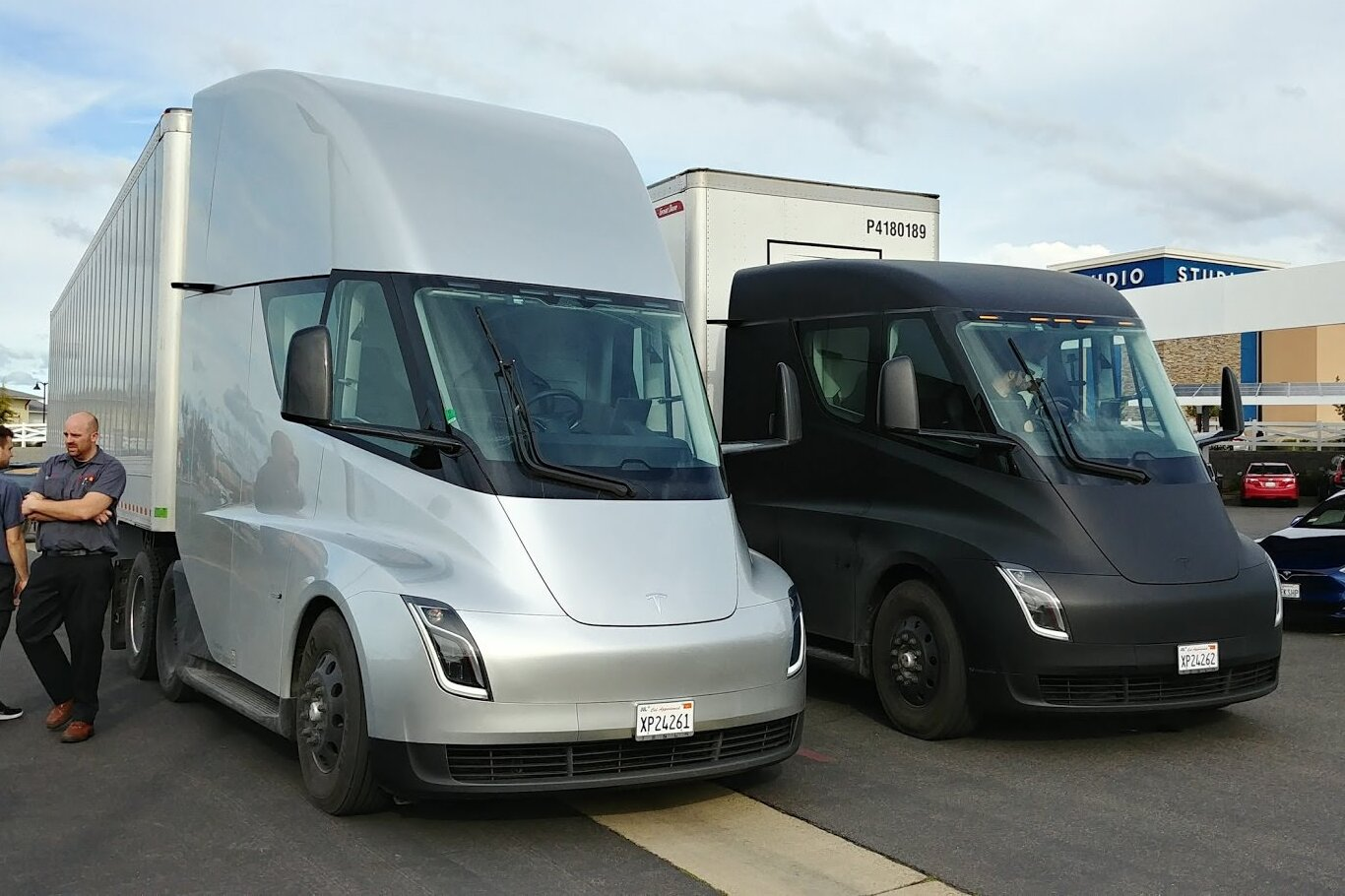
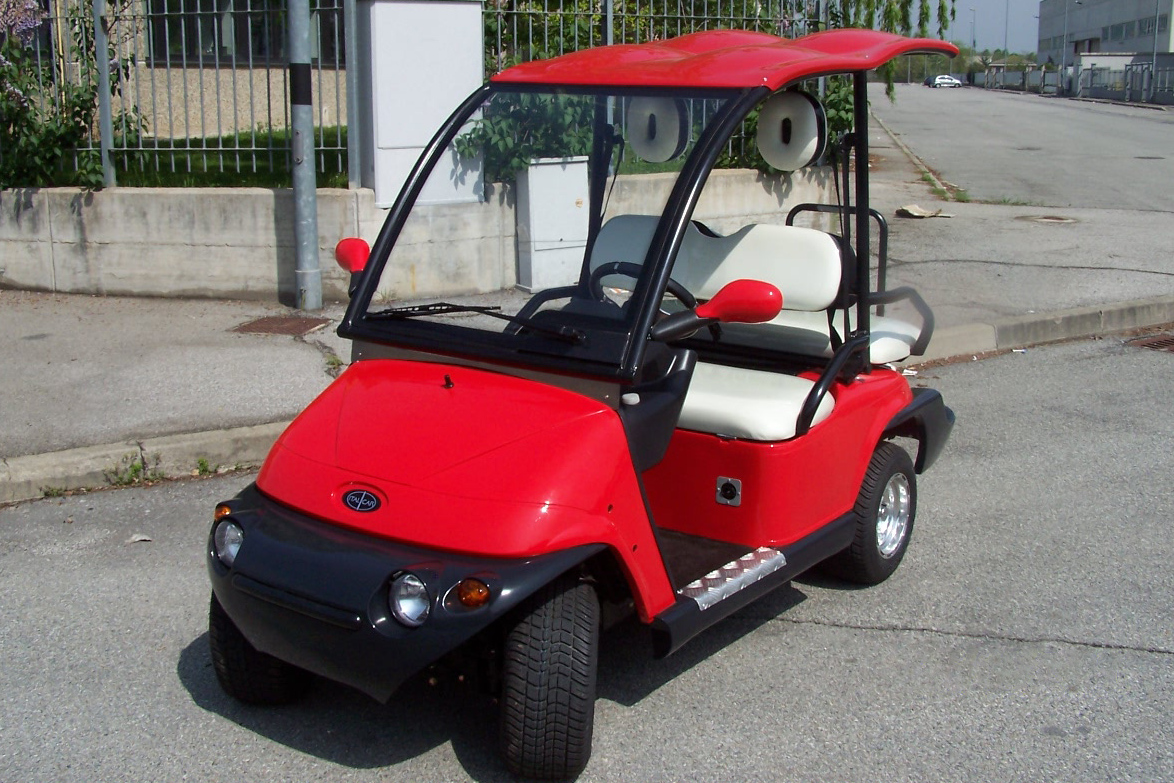
Electric vehicles around the world (left to right, from top):
- Electric car: a Tesla Model S charging from a Tesla Supercharger.
- Electric aircraft: the Solar Impulse 2, which circumnavigated the globe
- Electric boat, the China Zorrilla, the largest battery electric vehicle ever built.
- Electric high speed train: N700 Series Shinkansen of JR Central on the San'yo Shinkansen, Japan
- Battery electric bus: a BYD bus in Landskrona, Sweden
- E-bike, a Geero: with the removable battery integrated into the down tube.
- Electric truck: Class 8, a Tesla Semi in Rocklin, California
- Electric cart: an Italcar Attiva C2S.4

An electric vehicle (EV) is a vehicle propelled mostly by electric power. EVs encompass electric cars and other electric road vehicles (buses, trucks and personal transporters) as well as other types of land vehicles, such as electric rail vehicles (trains, trams and monorails). It also includes electric watercraft (boats and submersibles), aircraft (fixed-wing and multirotors), and spacecraft.

EVs originated in the late 19th century. Electricity was among the preferred methods for powering early motor vehicles because it was quieter, provided comfort, and ease of operation. However, its limited range hindered mass adoption throughout the 20th century. Internal combustion engines were the dominant propulsion mechanisms for cars and trucks for about 100 years, although electricity-powered locomotion became commonplace in other vehicle types, such as overhead line-powered mass transit vehicles, as well as special purpose vehicles such as mobility scooters.

Since the late 20th century, technological advances in lithium batteries—which offer superior energy density and current output versus lead-acid batteries—have revived public interest as zero-emission vehicle options. Manufacturers mostly switched to hybrids that use internal combustion engines like conventional vehicles, but add electric motors as a supplement, powered by electricity produced internally by motor-generators and recovered from regenerative braking. Plug-in hybrid electric vehicles, which can be recharged from an electric grid and use electric motors as the primary propulsion rather than as a supplement to combustion engines, did not see any mass production until the late 2000s, and battery electric cars did not become practical options for the consumer market until the 2010s. Although spacecraft have been propelled by electricity since the 1960s, non-rocket spacelaunch from Earth remains science fiction.

Technological progress in electric vehicle batteries, electric traction motors and automotive electronics has made electric cars more feasible and, in some cases, more cost-efficient than conventional ICE vehicles during the 21st century, with market penetration in some countries like China reaching nearly half of all new vehicles sold as of September 2025. As a means of reducing tailpipe emissions of greenhouse gases and other air pollutants, and to reduce the dependency on fossil fuels, government incentives are also available in many areas to promote the adoption of electric vehicles. As of 2026, the electric vehicle industry in China produces more than the rest of the world combined.

== History ==
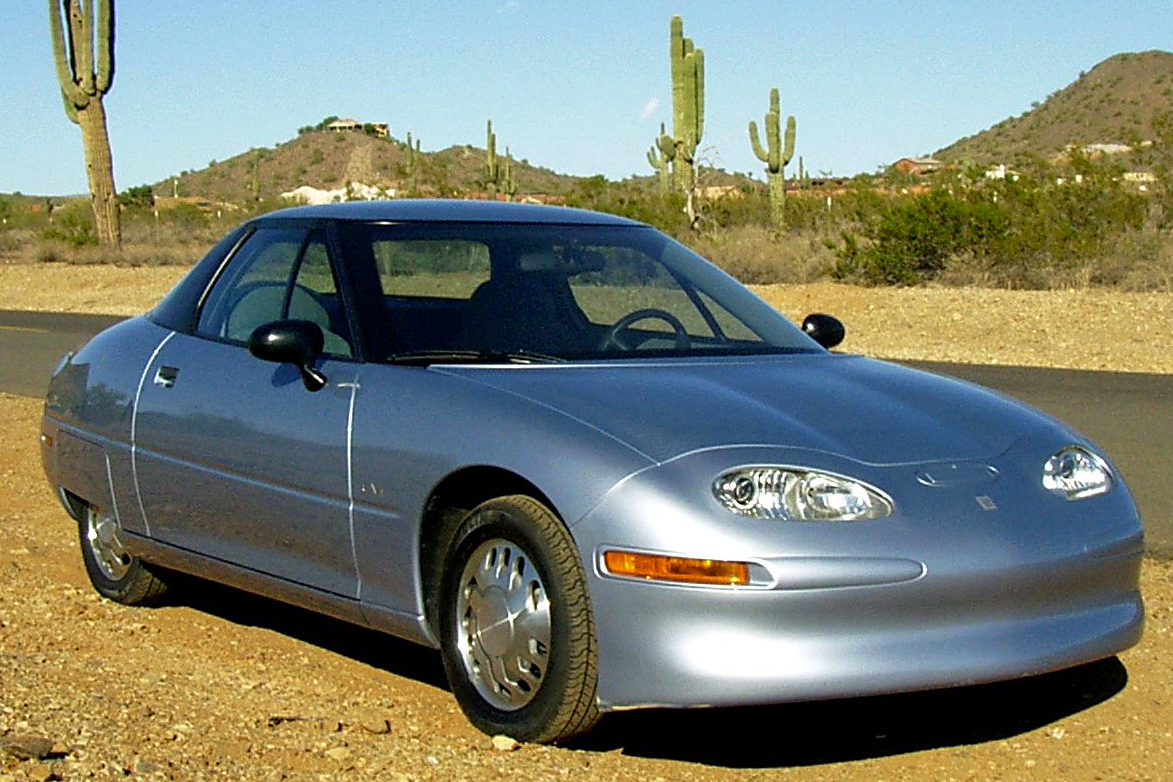
General Motors EV1 electric car (1996–1998), a subject of the film Who Killed the Electric Car?

=== 1990-2010s ===
In January 1990 General Motors president introduced its EV concept two-seater, the "Impact", at the Los Angeles Auto Show. That September, the California Air Resources Board mandated major-automaker sales of EVs, in phases starting in 1998. From 1996 to 1998 GM produced 1,117 EV1s, 800 of which were made available through three-year leases.

Chrysler, Ford, GM, Honda, and Toyota also produced limited numbers of EVs for California drivers during this period. In 2003, upon the expiration of GM's EV1 leases, GM discontinued them. The discontinuation has variously been attributed to: the auto industry's successful federal court challenge to California's zero-emissions vehicle mandate, a federal regulation requiring GM to produce and maintain spare parts for the few thousand EV1s and the success of the oil and auto industries' media campaign to reduce public acceptance of EVs.

A movie made on the subject in 2005–2006 was titled Who Killed the Electric Car? and released theatrically by Sony Pictures Classics in 2006. The film explores the roles of automobile manufacturers, oil industry, the U.S. government, batteries, hydrogen vehicles, and the general public, and each of their roles in limiting the deployment and adoption of this technology.

Ford released a number of their Ford Ecostar delivery vans into the market. Honda, Nissan and Toyota also repossessed and crushed most of their EVs, which, like the GM EV1s, had been available only by closed-end lease. After public protests, Toyota sold 200 of its RAV4 EVs; they later sold at over their original forty-thousand-dollar price. Later, BMW of Canada sold off a number of Mini EVs when their Canadian testing ended.

The production of the Citroën Berlingo Electrique stopped in September 2005. Zenn started production in 2006 but ended by 2009.

The global stock of both plug-in hybrid electric vehicles (PHEVs) and battery electric vehicles (BEVs) has grown steadily since the 2010s.

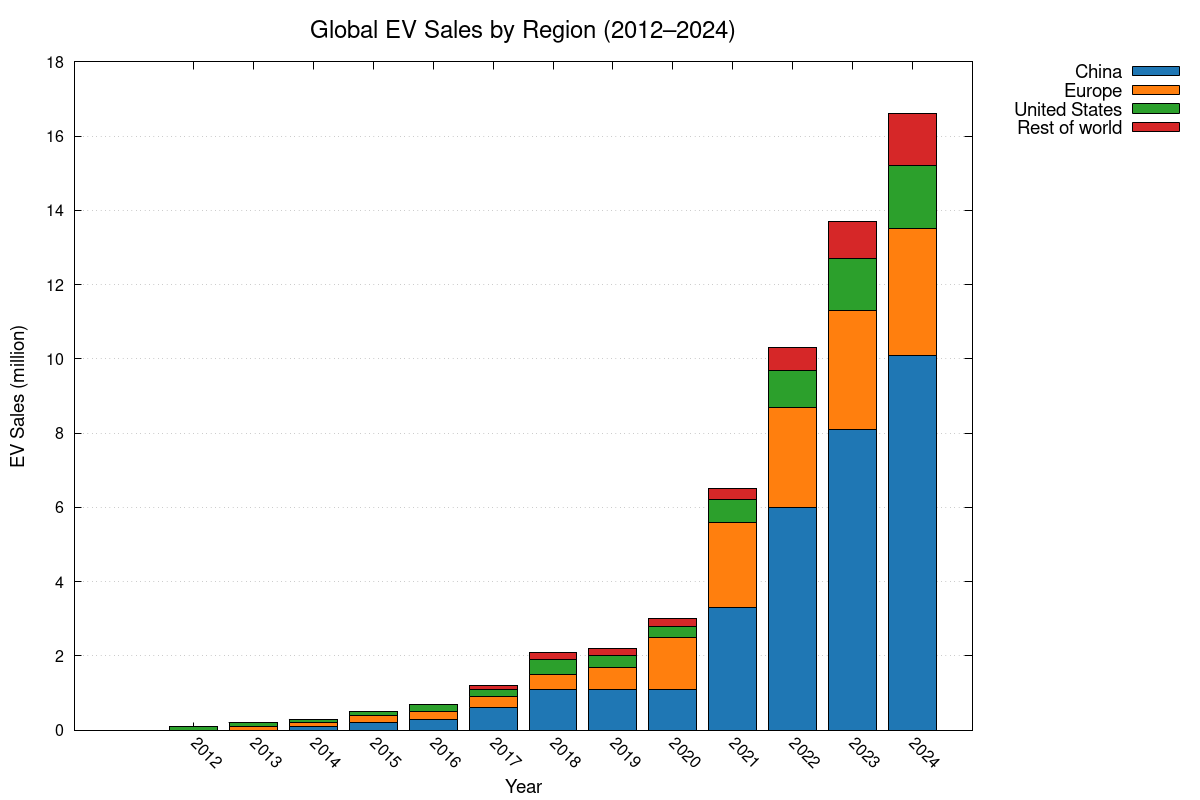
Sales of passenger electric vehicles (EVs) worldwide since 2012

Percentage-of-total-sales figures for electric, plug-in hybrid, and hybrid vehicles approximately quadrupled from 2020 to 2026.

During the late 20th and early 21st century, the environmental impact of the petroleum-based transportation infrastructure, along with the fear of peak oil, led to renewed interest in electric transportation infrastructure. By the 21st century an energy transition to electrify as many things as possible, not just vehicles, rather than burning stuff became to be seen as very important for human health and the environment. EVs differ from fossil fuel-powered vehicles in that the electricity they consume can be generated from a wide range of sources, including fossil fuels, nuclear power, and renewables such as solar power and wind power, or any combination of those. Recent advancements in battery technology and charging infrastructure have addressed many of the earlier barriers to EV adoption, making electric vehicles a more viable option for a wider range of consumers. The carbon footprint and other emissions of electric vehicles vary depending on the fuel and technology used for electricity generation. The electricity may be stored in the vehicle using a battery, flywheel, or supercapacitors. Vehicles using internal combustion engines usually only derive their energy from a single or a few sources, usually non-renewable fossil fuels. A key advantage of electric vehicles is regenerative braking, which recovers kinetic energy, typically lost during friction braking as heat, as electricity restored to the on-board battery.

=== 2020s ===
Technological progress in electric vehicle batteries, electric traction motors and automotive electronics (particularly electronic control units) has made electric cars more feasible and, in some cases, more cost-efficient than conventional ICE vehicles by the 2020s.

Although over 20% of new cars sold in 2024 were electric, only 2% of trucks were. As a means of reducing tailpipe emissions of greenhouse gases and other air pollutants, and to reduce the dependency on fossil fuels, government incentives are available in many areas to promote the adoption of electric vehicles.

By 2024 China was the world's leading EV producer, accounting for more than 70% of global production and 67% of global sales of electric vehicles. Nearly half of all new vehicles sold in China as of September 2025 were EVs. As of 2026, the electric vehicle industry in China produces more than the rest of the world combined.

== Electricity sources ==
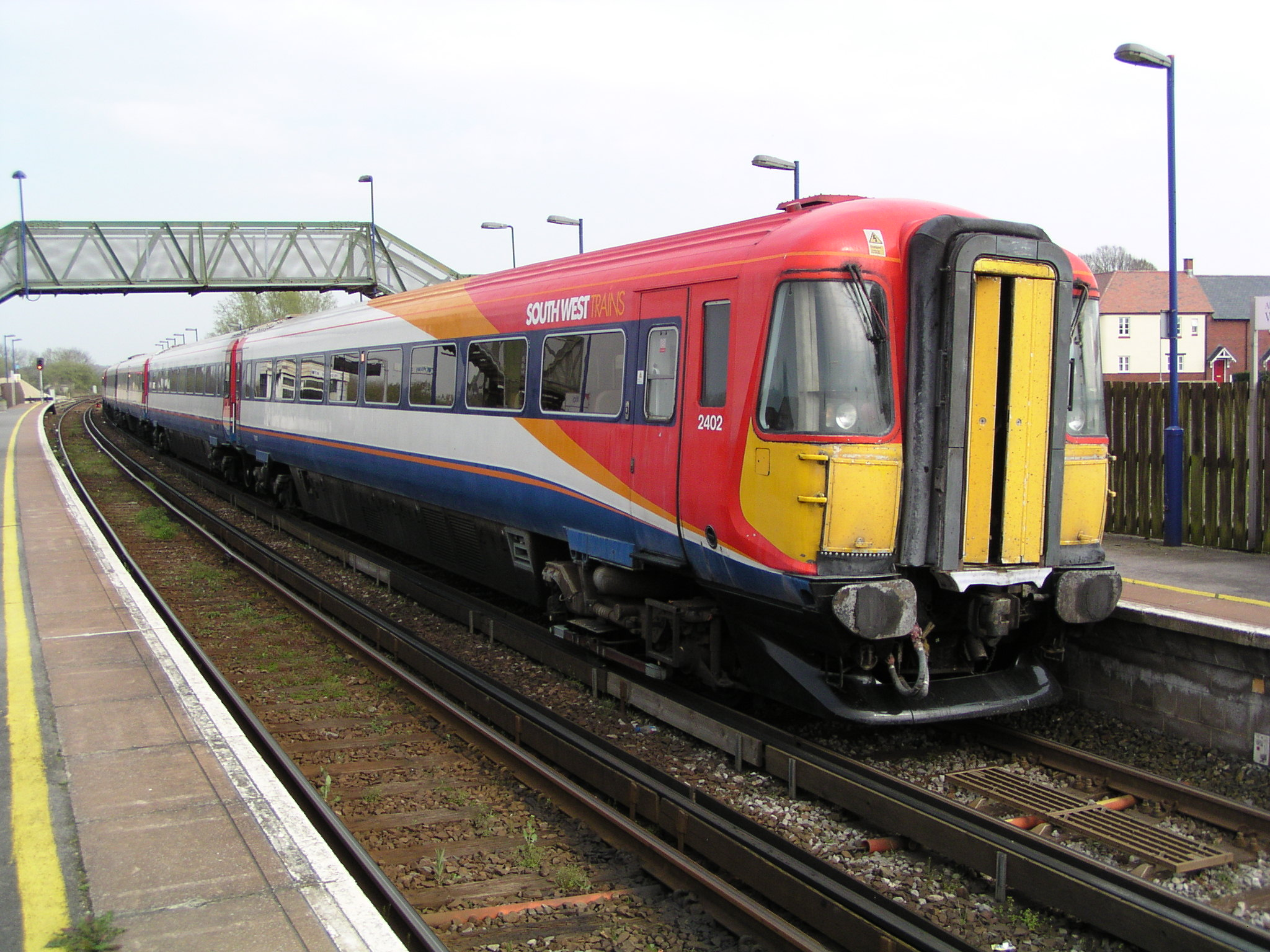
A passenger train, taking power through a third rail with return through the traction rails

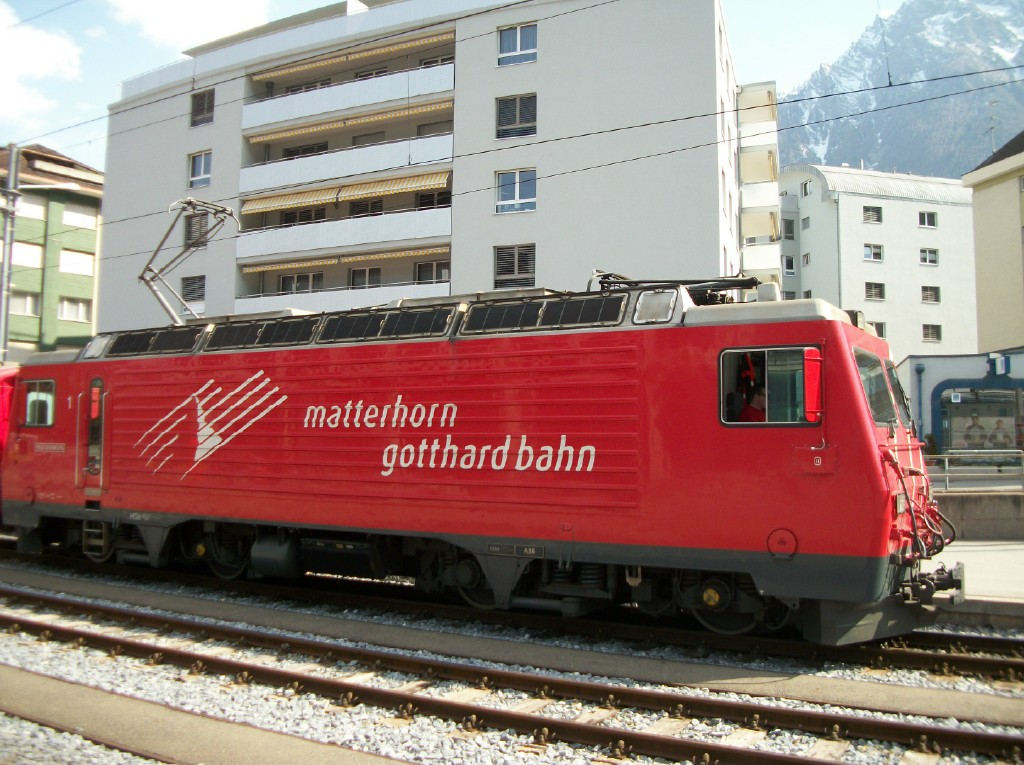
An electric locomotive at Brig, Switzerland

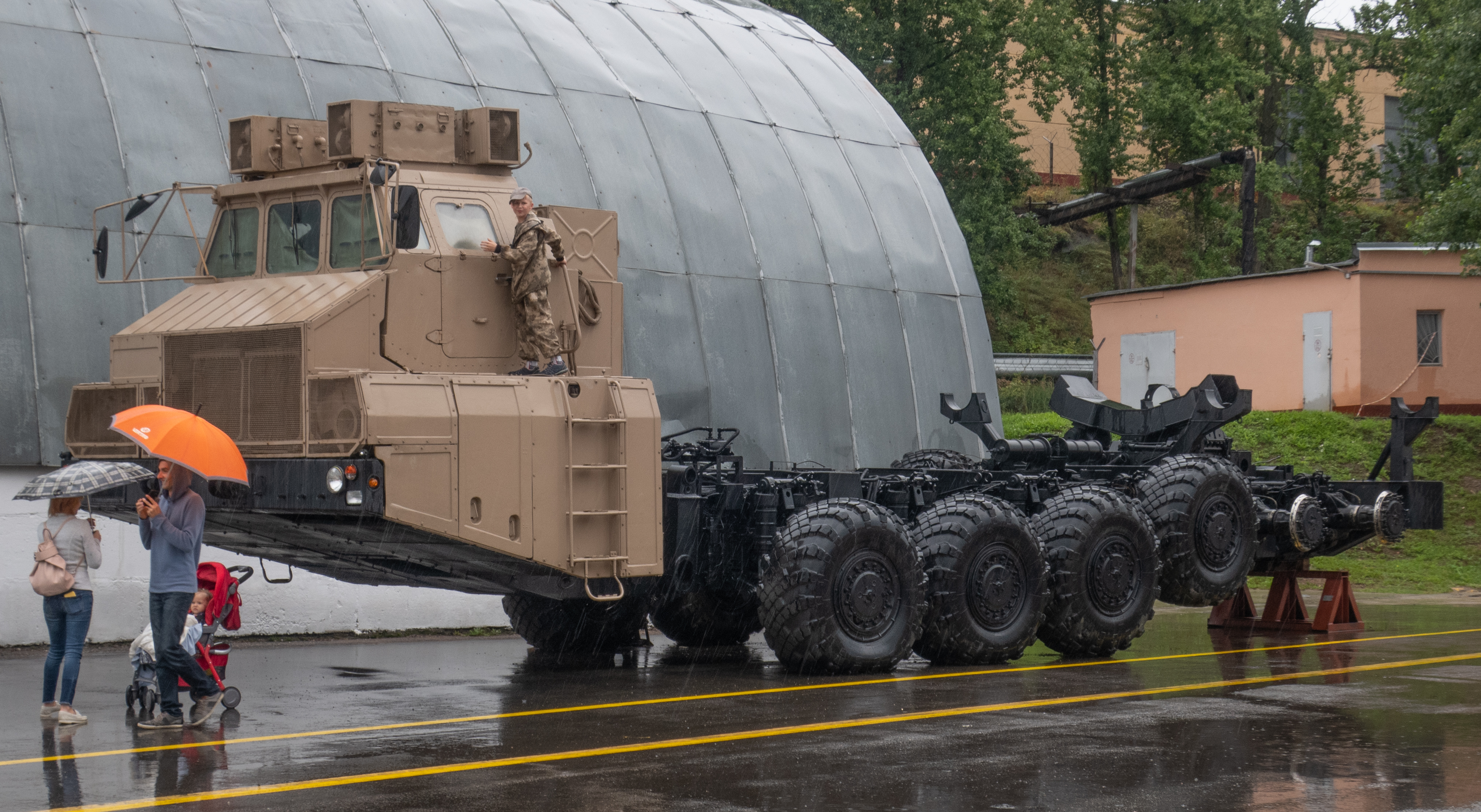
The MAZ-7907 uses an on-board generator to power in-wheel electric motors.

Fuel use in vehicle designs
Vehicle type	Fuel used
Combustion-only vehicle (ICE)	Exclusively uses petroleum or other fuel.
Micro hybrid electric vehicle (μHEV)	Exclusively uses petroleum or other fuel, but can shut off engine to consume less.
Mild hybrid electric vehicle (MHEV, BAHV)	Exclusively uses petroleum or other fuel, but has electric battery to consume less.
Plug-in hybrid vehicle (PHEV)	Uses mixture of petroleum or other fuel and electricity from power grid.
All-electric vehicle (BEV, AEV)	Exclusively uses electricity from power grid.
Fuel cell vehicle (FCV, FCEV)	Exclusively uses hydrogen or other fuel to generate electricity.

EVs are much more efficient than internal combustion engines and have few direct emissions. At the same time, they do rely on electrical energy that is generally provided by a combination of non-fossil fuel plants and fossil fuel plants.

There are many ways to generate electricity, of varying costs, efficiency and ecological desirability. EVs can be made less polluting overall by modifying the source of electricity. In some areas, individuals can ask utilities to provide their electricity from renewable energy. Therefore, it gives the greatest degree of energy resilience.

=== Connection to generator plants ===
- Direct connection to electric grids as is common among electric trains, trams, trolleybuses, and trolleytrucks (see also: overhead lines, third rail and conduit current collection)
- Online electric vehicle collects power from electric power strips buried under the road surface through electromagnetic induction

=== Onboard generators and hybrid EVs ===
- Generated on-board using a diesel engine: diesel–electric locomotive and diesel–electric multiple unit (DEMU)
- Generated on-board using a fuel cell: fuel cell vehicle
- Generated on-board using nuclear power: nuclear submarines and aircraft carriers
- Renewable sources such as solar power: solar vehicle

It is also possible to have hybrid EVs that derive electricity from multiple sources, such as:

- On-board rechargeable electricity storage system (RESS) and a direct continuous connection to land-based generation plants for purposes of on-highway recharging with unrestricted highway range
- On-board rechargeable electricity storage system and a fueled propulsion power source (internal combustion engine): plug-in hybrid

For especially large EVs, such as submarines, the chemical energy of the diesel–electric can be replaced by a nuclear reactor. The nuclear reactor usually provides heat, which drives a steam turbine, which drives a generator, which is then fed to the propulsion. See Nuclear marine propulsion.

A few experimental vehicles, such as some cars and a handful of aircraft use solar panels for electricity.

=== Onboard storage ===
These systems are powered from an external generator plant (nearly always when stationary), and then disconnected before motion occurs, and the electricity is stored in the vehicle until needed.

- Full Electric Vehicles (FEV). Power storage methods include:
  - Chemical energy stored on the vehicle in on-board batteries: Battery electric vehicle (BEV) typically with a lithium-ion battery
  - Kinetic energy storage: flywheels
  - Static energy stored on the vehicle in on-board electric double-layer capacitors

Batteries, electric double-layer capacitors and flywheel energy storage are forms of rechargeable on-board electricity storage systems. By avoiding an intermediate mechanical step, the energy conversion efficiency can be improved compared to hybrids by avoiding unnecessary energy conversions. Furthermore, electro-chemical batteries conversions are reversible, allowing electrical energy to be stored in chemical form.

== Components ==
An electric vehicle (EV) is a vehicle propelled mostly by electric power. The type of battery, the type of traction motor and the motor controller design vary according to the size, power, and proposed application, which can be as small as a motorized shopping cart or wheelchair, through pedelecs, electric motorcycles and scooters, neighborhood electric vehicles, industrial fork-lift trucks, and including many hybrid vehicles.

=== Battery ===
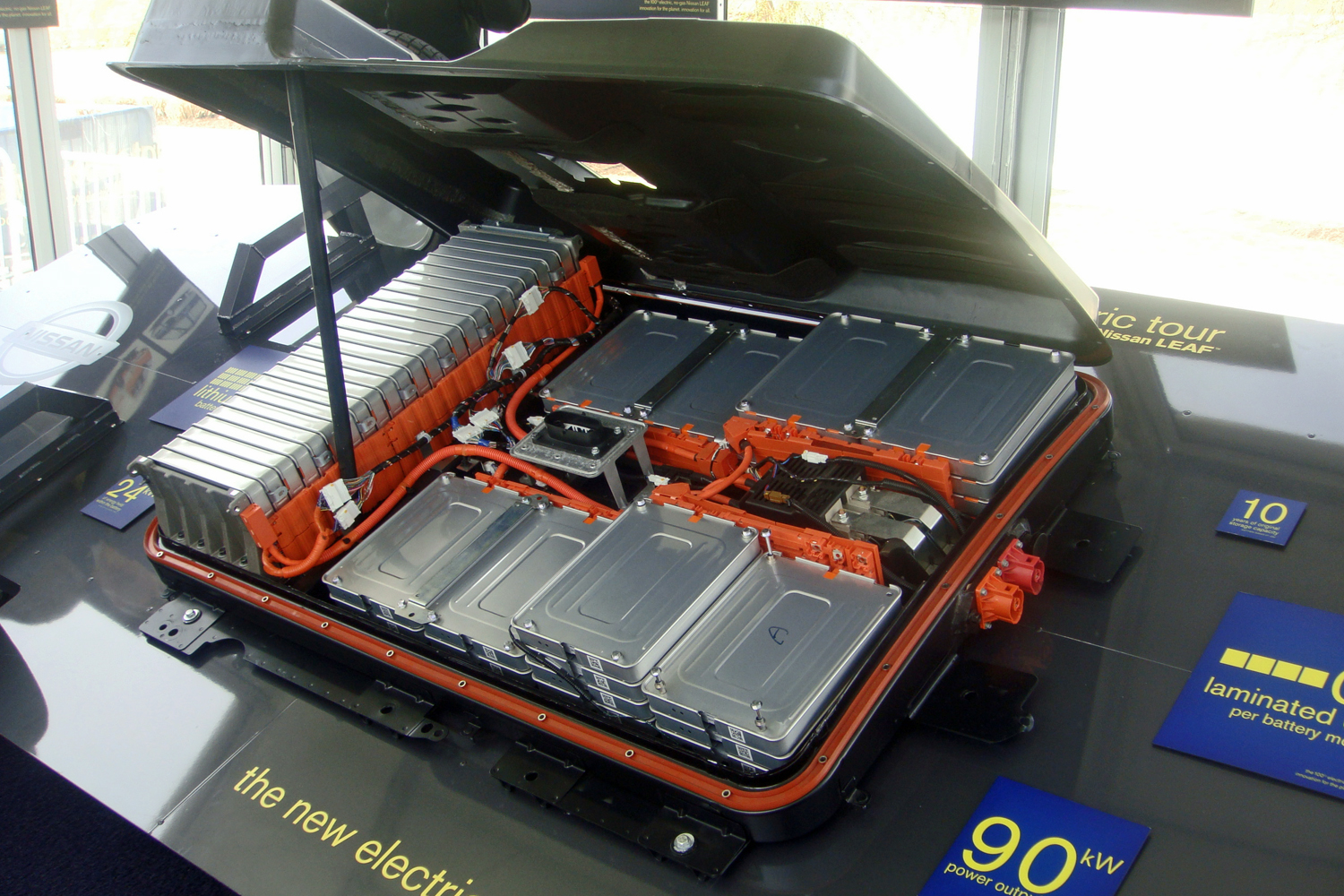
A lithium-ion battery pack of the 2011 Nissan Leaf

An electric-vehicle battery (EVB) in addition to the traction battery specialty systems used for industrial (or recreational) vehicles, is a battery used to power the propulsion system of a battery electric vehicle (BEVs). These batteries are usually a secondary (rechargeable) battery, and are typically lithium-ion batteries.

Traction batteries, specifically designed with a high ampere-hour capacity, are used in forklifts, electric golf carts, riding floor scrubbers, electric motorcycles, electric cars, trucks, vans, and other electric vehicles.

Most battery-electric vehicles also include a separate low-voltage auxiliary battery, commonly a 12-volt system, which powers accessories and control electronics. This auxiliary battery is typically recharged from the high-voltage traction battery through a DC/DC converter.

Failures in the auxiliary-battery charging system can immobilize a vehicle even when the traction battery remains charged. In 2024, Hyundai and Kia recalls cited failures of the Integrated Charging Control Unit (ICCU) that could stop charging the 12-volt battery and lead to a loss of drive power.

==== Lithium-ion battery ====
Battery prices fell, given economies of scale and new cell chemistries improving energy density. However, general inflationary pressures, and rising costs of raw materials and components, inhibited price declines in the early 2020s.

Since their first commercial release in 1991, lithium-ion batteries have become an important technology for achieving low-carbon transportation systems. Most electric vehicles use lithium-ion batteries (Li-Ions or LIBs). Lithium-ion batteries have a higher energy density, longer life span, and higher power density than most other practical batteries. Complicating factors include safety, durability, thermal breakdown, environmental impact, and cost. Li-ion batteries should be used within safe temperature and voltage ranges to operate safely and efficiently.

Increasing the battery's lifespan decreases effective costs and environmental impact. One technique is to operate a subset of the battery cells at a time and switching these subsets.

In the past, nickel–metal hydride batteries were used in some electric cars, such as those made by General Motors. These battery types are considered outdated due to their tendencies to self-discharge in the heat. Furthermore, a patent for this type of battery was held by Chevron, which created a problem for their widespread development. These factors, coupled with their high cost, has led to lithium-ion batteries leading as the predominant battery for EVs.

The prices of lithium-ion batteries have declined dramatically over the past decade, contributing to a reduction in price for electric vehicles, but an increase in the price of critical minerals such as lithium from 2021 to the end of 2022 has put pressure on historical battery price decreases.

=== Electric motor ===
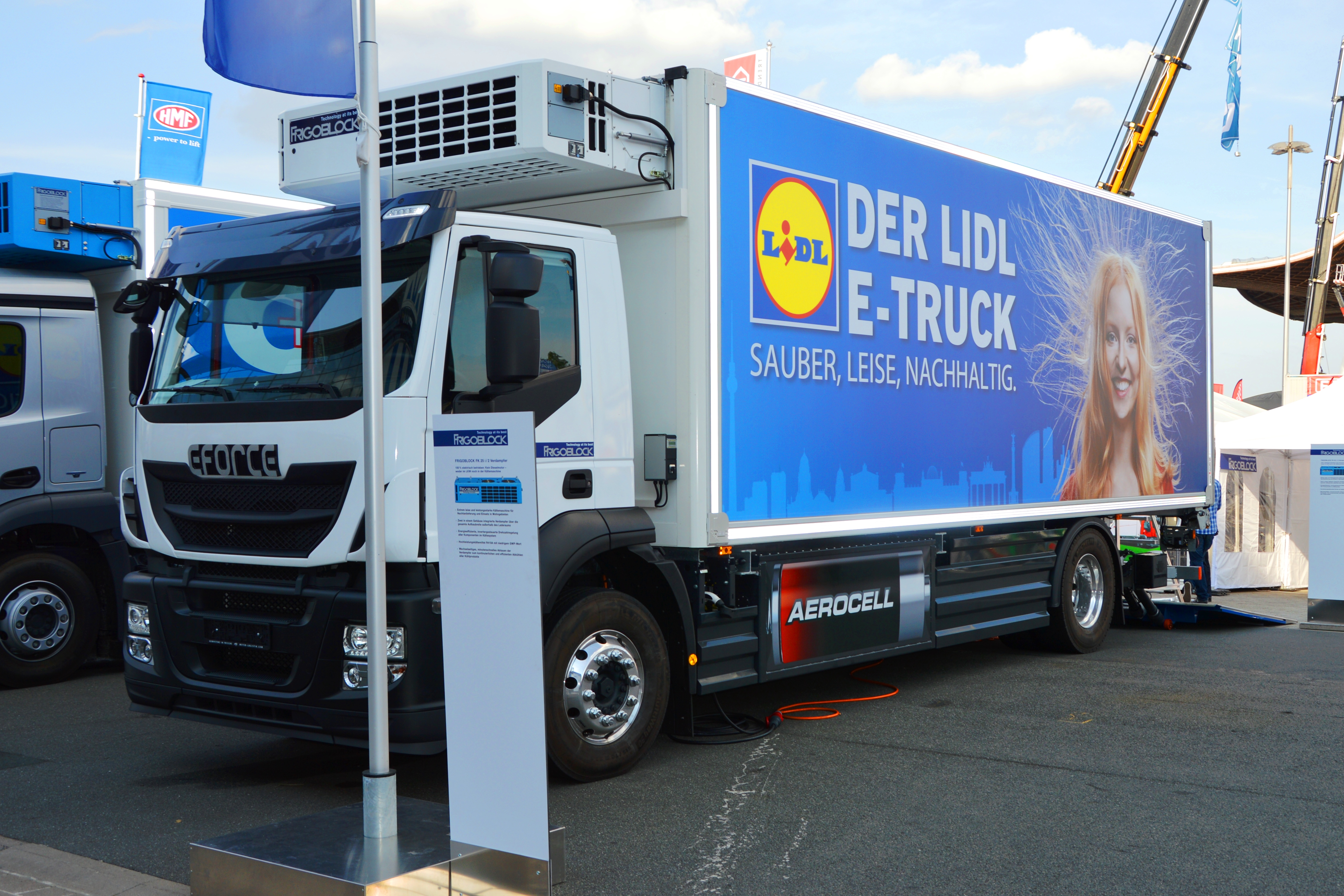
Electric truck e-Force One

The power of a vehicle's electric motor, as in other machines, is measured in kilowatts (kW). Electric motors can deliver their maximum torque over a wide RPM range. This means that the performance of a vehicle with a 100 kW electric motor exceeds that of a vehicle with a 100 kW internal combustion engine, which can only deliver its maximum torque within a limited range of engine speed.

Efficiency of charging varies considerably depending on the type of charger, and energy is lost during the process of converting the electrical energy to mechanical energy.

Usually, direct current (DC) electricity is fed into a DC/AC inverter where it is converted to alternating current (AC) electricity and this AC electricity is connected to a 3-phase AC motor.

For electric trains, forklift trucks, and some electric cars, DC motors are often used. In some cases, universal motors are used, and then AC or DC may be employed. In recent production vehicles, various motor types have been implemented; for instance, induction motors within Tesla vehicles and permanent magnet machines in the Nissan Leaf and Chevrolet Bolt.

=== Energy and motors ===
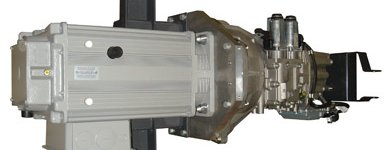
An electric powertrain used by Power Vehicle Innovation for trucks or buses

Tesla Model S drive motor

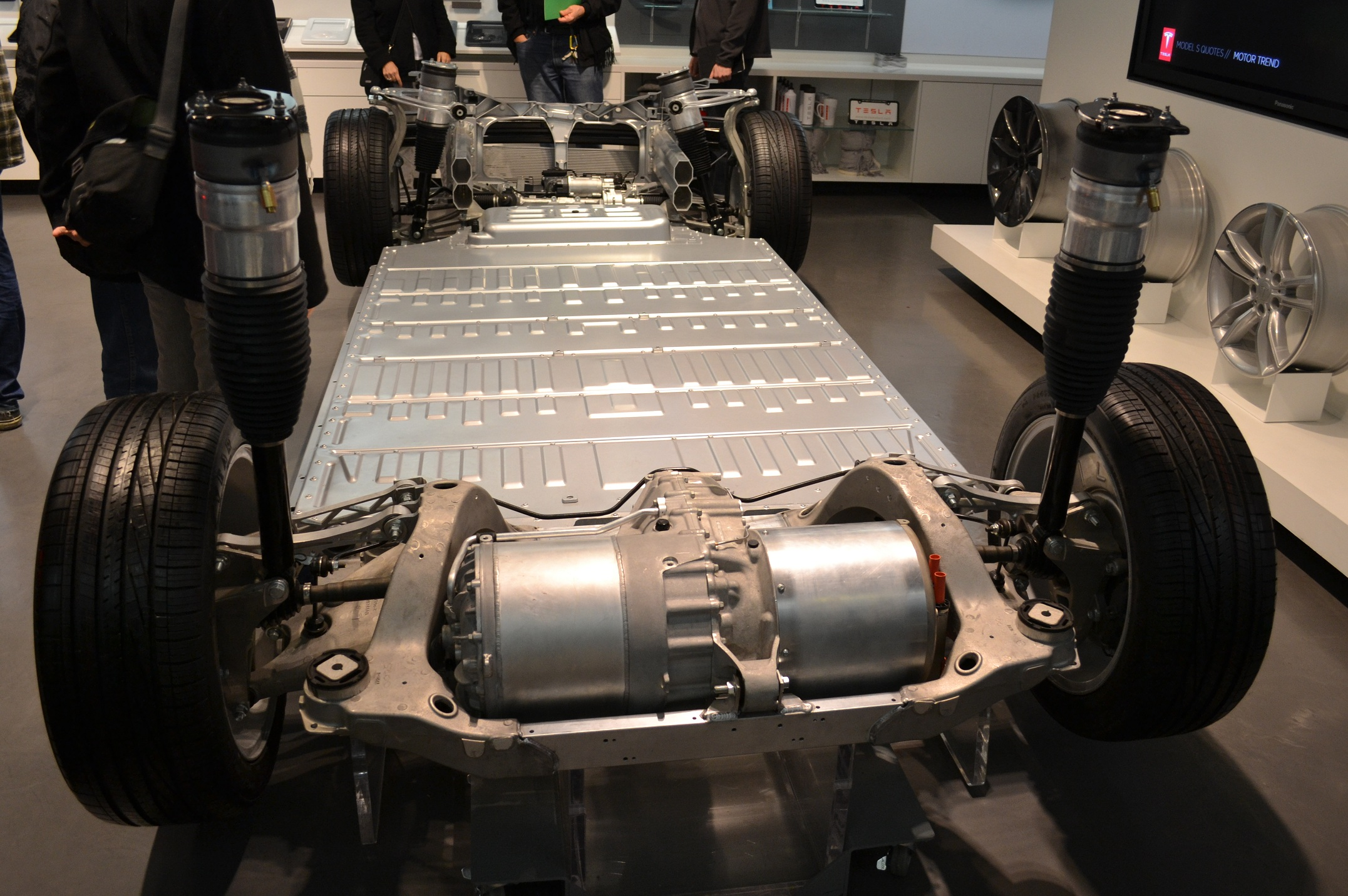
Mounted on chassis

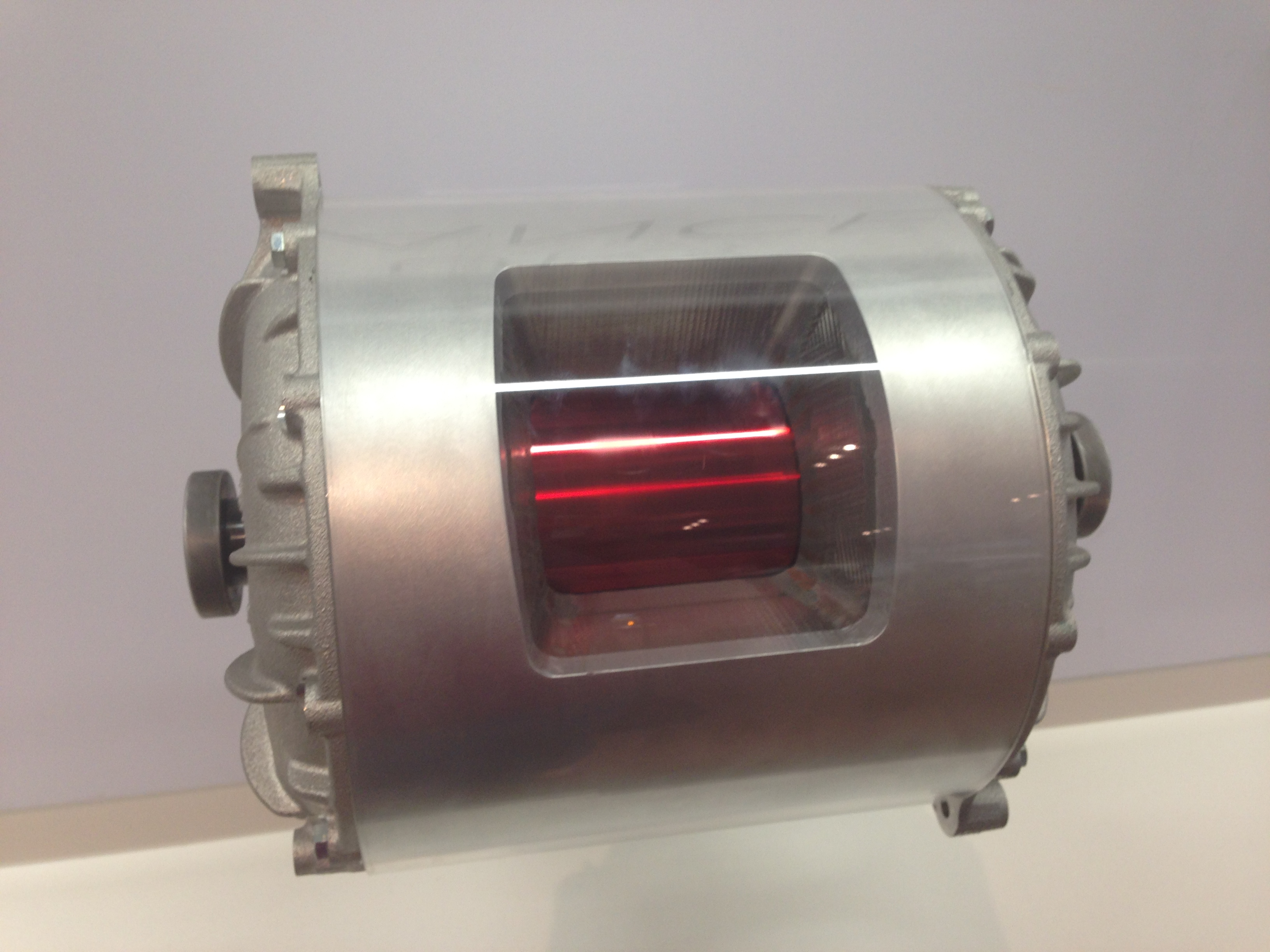
Cutaway view

Electric motors are mechanically very simple and often achieve 90% energy conversion efficiency over the full range of speeds and power output and can be precisely controlled.

Motion is provided by a rotary electric motor. However, it is possible to "unroll" the motor to drive directly against a special matched track. These linear motors are used in maglev trains which float above the rails supported by magnetic levitation. This allows for almost no rolling resistance of the vehicle and no mechanical wear and tear of the train or track. In addition to the high-performance control systems needed, switching and curving of the tracks becomes difficult with linear motors, which to date has restricted their operations to high-speed point to point services.

Electric traction allows the use of regenerative braking, in which the motors are used as brakes and become generators that transform the motion of, usually, a train into electrical power that is then fed back into the lines. This system is particularly advantageous in mountainous operations, as descending vehicles can produce a large portion of the power required for those ascending, and in start-and-stop city use. This regenerative system is only viable if the system is large enough to use the power generated by descending vehicles.

They can be finely controlled and provide high torque from stationary-to-moving, unlike internal combustion engines, and do not need multiple gears to match power curves. This removes the need for gearboxes and torque converters.

EVs provide quiet and smooth operation and consequently have less noise and vibration than internal combustion engines. While this is a desirable attribute, it has also evoked concern that the absence of the usual sounds of an approaching vehicle poses a danger to blind, elderly and very young pedestrians. To mitigate this situation, many countries mandate warning sounds when EVs are moving slowly, up to a speed when normal motion and rotation (road, suspension, electric motor, etc.) noises become audible.

Electric motors do not require oxygen, unlike internal combustion engines; this is useful for submarines and for space rovers.

== Types ==
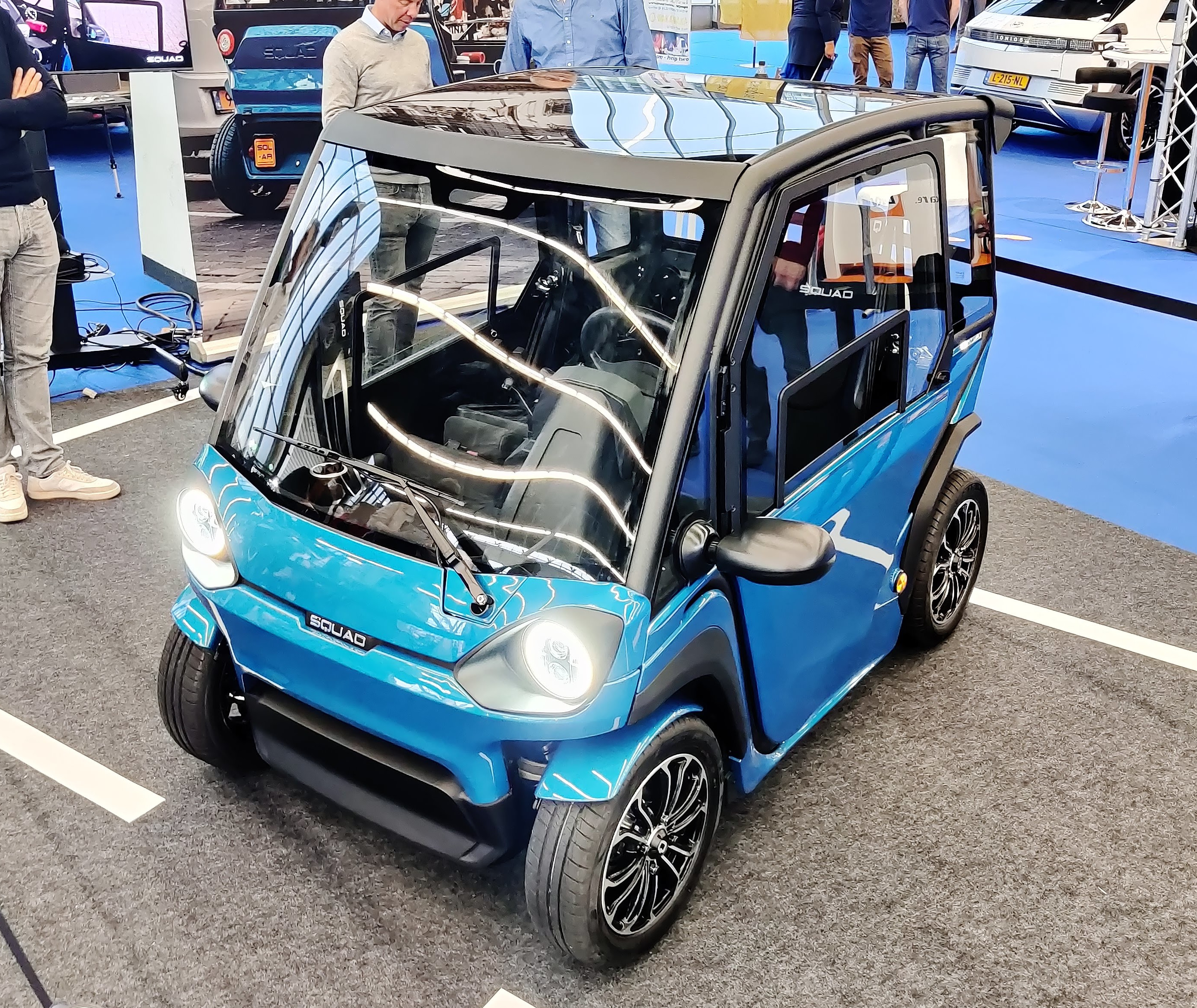
Neighborhood Electric Vehicle, Squad Solar NEV, with solar panel roof

It is generally possible to equip any kind of vehicle with an electric power-train.

=== Ground vehicles ===
==== Pure-electric vehicles ====
A pure-electric vehicle or all-electric vehicle is powered exclusively through electric motors. The electricity may come from a battery (battery electric vehicle), solar panel (solar vehicle) or fuel cell (fuel cell vehicle).

==== Hybrids ====
A hybrid electric vehicle (HEV) is a type of hybrid vehicle that couples a conventional internal combustion engine (ICE) with one or more electric engines into a combined propulsion system. The presence of the electric powertrain, which has inherently better energy conversion efficiency, is intended to achieve either better fuel economy or better acceleration performance than a conventional vehicle. There is a variety of HEV types and the degree to which each functions as an electric vehicle (EV) also varies. The most common form of HEV is hybrid electric passenger cars, although hybrid electric trucks (pickups, tow trucks and tractors), buses, motorboats, and aircraft also exist.

Modern HEVs use energy recovery technologies such as motor–generator units and regenerative braking to recycle the vehicle's kinetic energy to electric energy via an alternator, which is stored in a battery pack or a supercapacitor. Some varieties of HEV use an internal combustion engine to directly drive an electrical generator, which either recharges the vehicle's batteries or directly powers the electric traction motors; this combination is known as a range extender. Many HEVs reduce idle emissions by temporarily shutting down the combustion engine at idle (such as when waiting at the traffic light) and restarting it when needed; this is known as a start-stop system. A hybrid-electric system produces less tailpipe emissions than a comparably sized petrol engine vehicle since the hybrid's petrol engine usually has smaller displacement and thus lower fuel consumption than that of a conventional petrol-powered vehicle. If the engine is not used to drive the car directly, it can be geared to run at maximum efficiency, further improving fuel economy.

There are different ways that a hybrid electric vehicle can combine the power from an electric motor and the internal combustion engine. The most common type is a parallel hybrid that connects the engine and the electric motor to the wheels through mechanical coupling. In this scenario, the electric motor and the engine can drive the wheels directly. Series hybrids only use the electric motor to drive the wheels and can often be referred to as extended-range electric vehicles (EREVs) or range-extended electric vehicles (REEVs). There are also series–parallel hybrids where the vehicle can be powered by the engine working alone, the electric motor on its own, or by both working together; this is designed so that the engine can run at its optimum range as often as possible.

==== Plug-ins ====
A plug-in electric vehicle (PEV) is any motor vehicle that can be recharged from any external source of electricity, such as wall sockets, and the electricity stored in the Rechargeable battery packs drives or contributes to drive the wheels. PEV is a subcategory of electric vehicles that includes battery electric vehicles (BEVs), plug-in hybrid vehicles, (PHEVs), and electric vehicle conversions of hybrid electric vehicles and conventional internal combustion engine vehicles.

==== Range-extended ====
A range-extended electric vehicle (REEV) is a vehicle powered by an electric motor and a plug-in battery. An auxiliary combustion engine is used only to supplement battery charging and not as the primary source of power.

==== On- and off-road ====
On-road electric vehicles include electric cars, electric trolleybuses, electric buses, battery electric buses, electric trucks, electric bicycles, electric motorcycles and scooters, personal transporters, neighborhood electric vehicles, golf carts, milk floats, and forklifts. Off-road vehicles include electrified all-terrain vehicles and electric tractors.

==== Trucks ====
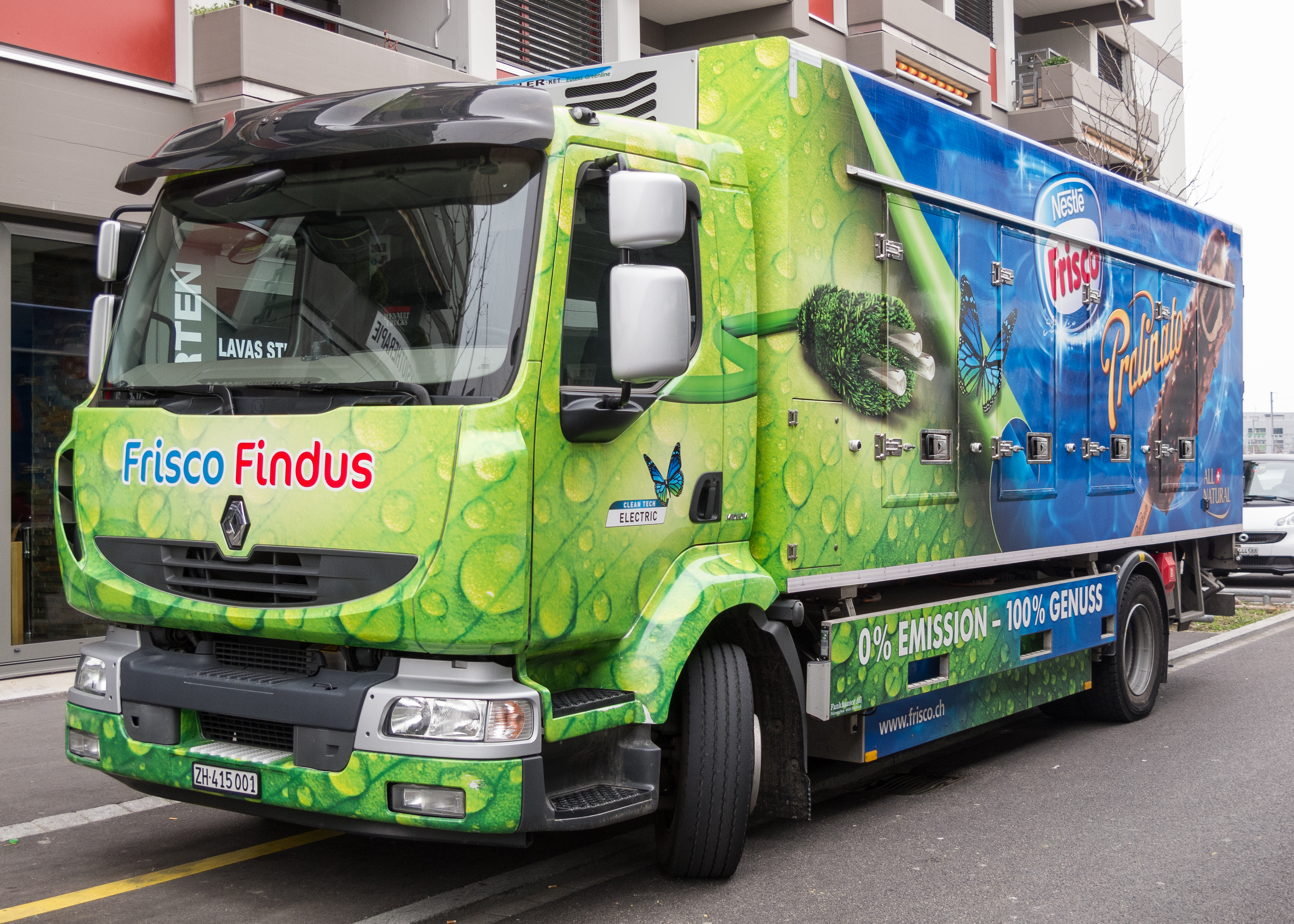
Electric Renault Midlum used by Nestlé in 2015

An electric truck is a battery electric vehicle (BEV) designed to transport cargo, carry specialized payloads, or perform other utilitarian work.

Electric trucks have serviced niche applications like milk floats, pushback tugs and forklifts for over a hundred years, typically using lead–acid batteries, but the rapid development of lighter and more energy-dense battery chemistries in the twenty-first century has broadened the range of applicability of electric propulsion to trucks in many more roles.

Electric trucks reduce noise and pollution, relative to internal-combustion trucks. Due to the high efficiency and low component-counts of electric power trains, no fuel burning while idle, and silent and efficient acceleration, the costs of owning and operating electric trucks are dramatically lower than their predecessors.

Long-distance freight has been the trucking segment least amenable to electrification, since the increased weight of batteries, relative to fuel, detracts from payload capacity, and the alternative, more frequent recharging, detracts from delivery time. By contrast, short-haul urban delivery has been electrified rapidly, since the clean and quiet nature of electric trucks fit well with urban planning and municipal regulation, and the capacities of reasonably sized batteries are well-suited to daily stop-and-go traffic within a metropolitan area.

==== Railborne ====
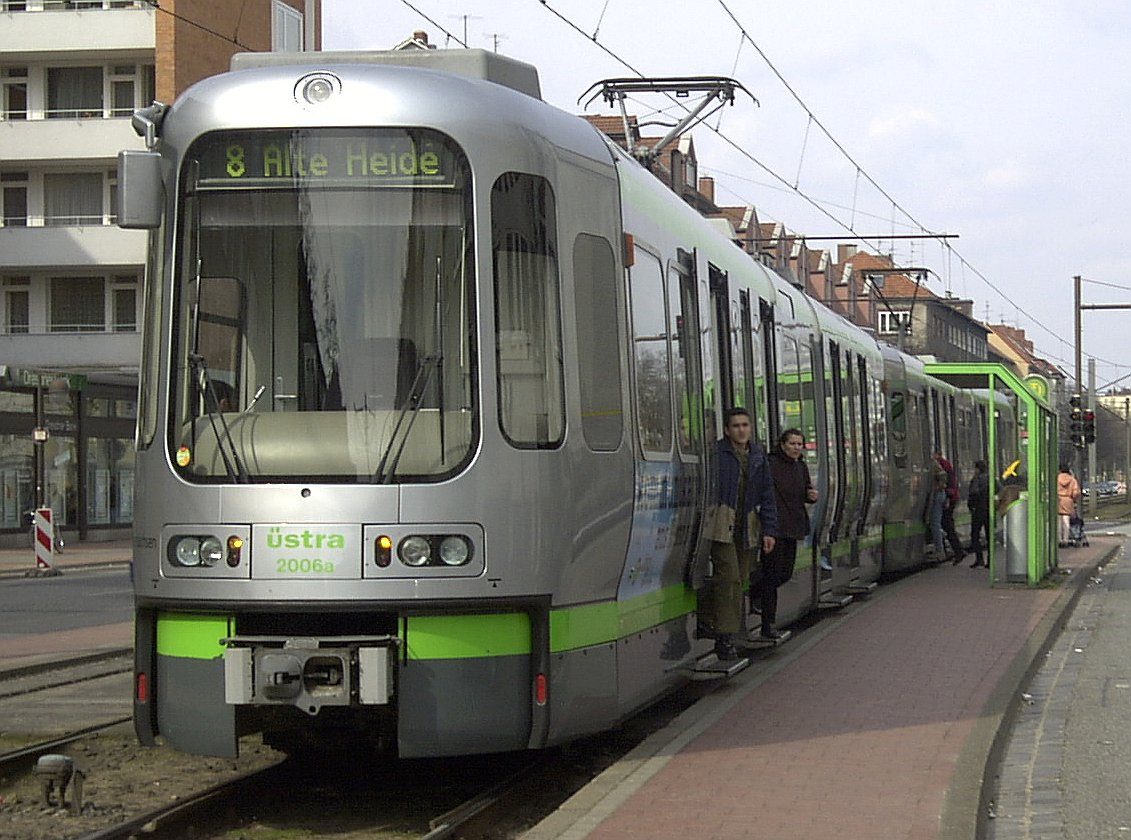
A tram (or streetcar) in Hanover drawing current from a single overhead wire through a pantograph.

The fixed nature of a rail line makes it relatively easy to power EVs through permanent overhead lines or electrified third rails, eliminating the need for heavy onboard batteries. Electric locomotives, electric multiple units, electric trams (also called streetcars or trolleys), electric light rail systems, and electric rapid transit are all in common use today, especially in Europe and Asia.

Since electric trains do not need to carry a heavy internal combustion engine or large batteries, they can have very good power-to-weight ratios. This allows high speed trains such as France's double-deck TGVs to operate at speeds of 320 km/h (200 mph) or higher, and electric locomotives to have a much higher power output than diesel locomotives. In addition, they have higher short-term surge power for fast acceleration, and using regenerative brakes can put braking power back into the electrical grid rather than wasting it.

Maglev trains are also nearly always EVs.

There are also battery electric passenger trains operating on non-electrified rail lines.

===== Hydrogen trains =====
Particularly in Europe, fuel-cell electric trains are gaining in popularity to replace diesel–electric locomotive units. In Germany, several Länder have ordered Alstom Coradia iLINT trainsets, in service since 2018, with France also planning to order trainsets. The United Kingdom, the Netherlands, Denmark, Norway, Italy, Canada and Mexico are equally interested. In France, the SNCF plans to replace all its remaining diesel-electric trains with hydrogen trains by 2035. In the United Kingdom, Alstom announced in 2018 their plan to retrofit British Rail Class 321 trainsets with fuel cells.

=== Watercraft ===
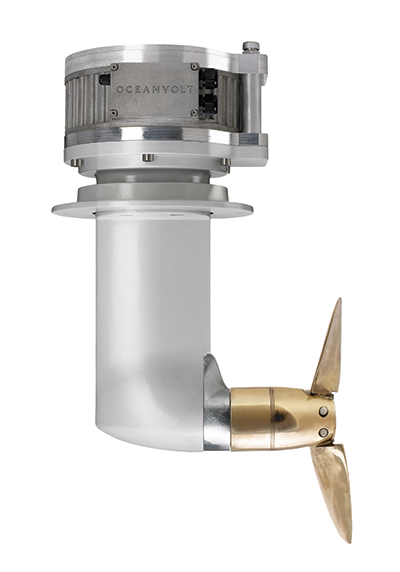
Oceanvolt SD8.6 electric saildrive motor

Electric boats were popular around the turn of the 20th century. Interest in quiet and potentially renewable marine transportation has steadily increased since the late 20th century, as solar cells have given motorboats the infinite range of sailboats. Electric motors can and have also been used in sailboats instead of traditional diesel engines. Electric ferries operate routinely. Submarines use batteries (charged by diesel or gasoline engines at the surface), nuclear power, fuel cells or Stirling engines to run electric motor-driven propellers. Fully electric tugboats are being used in Auckland, New Zealand (June 2022), Vancouver, British Columbia (October 2023), and San Diego, California.

=== Aircraft ===
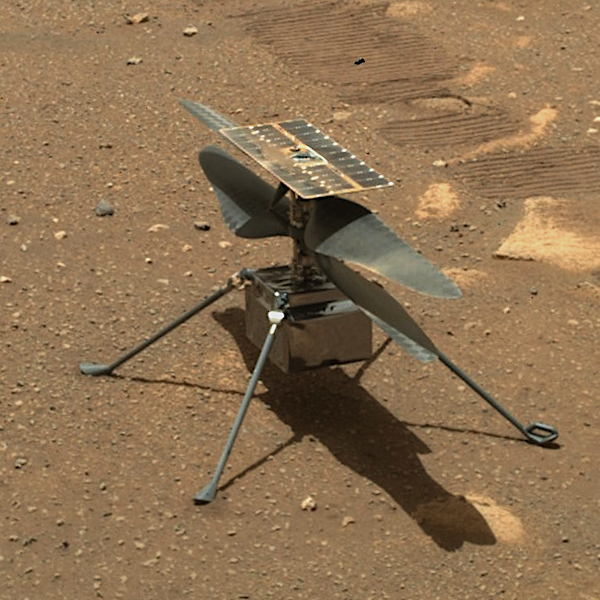
Mars helicopter Ingenuity

Since the beginnings of aviation, electric power for aircraft has received a great deal of experimentation. Currently, flying electric aircraft include piloted and unpiloted aerial vehicles.

=== Spacecraft ===
Electric power has a long history of use in spacecraft. The power sources used for spacecraft are batteries, solar panels and nuclear power. Current methods of propelling a spacecraft with electricity include the arcjet rocket, the electrostatic ion thruster, the Hall-effect thruster, and Field Emission Electric Propulsion.

==== Rovers ====
Electric vehicles are the only option for rovers as there is simply no oxygen gas to drive combustion engines in outer space and Exoplanetary atmospheres. Crewed and uncrewed electric vehicles have been used to explore the Moon and other planets in the Solar System. On the last three missions of the Apollo program in 1971 and 1972, astronauts drove silver-oxide battery-powered Lunar Roving Vehicles distances up to 35.7 kilometers (22.2 mi) on the lunar surface. Solar-powered, remotely controlled uncrewed rovers have also explored the Moon and Mars.

== Charging/fueling ==
=== Stations ===
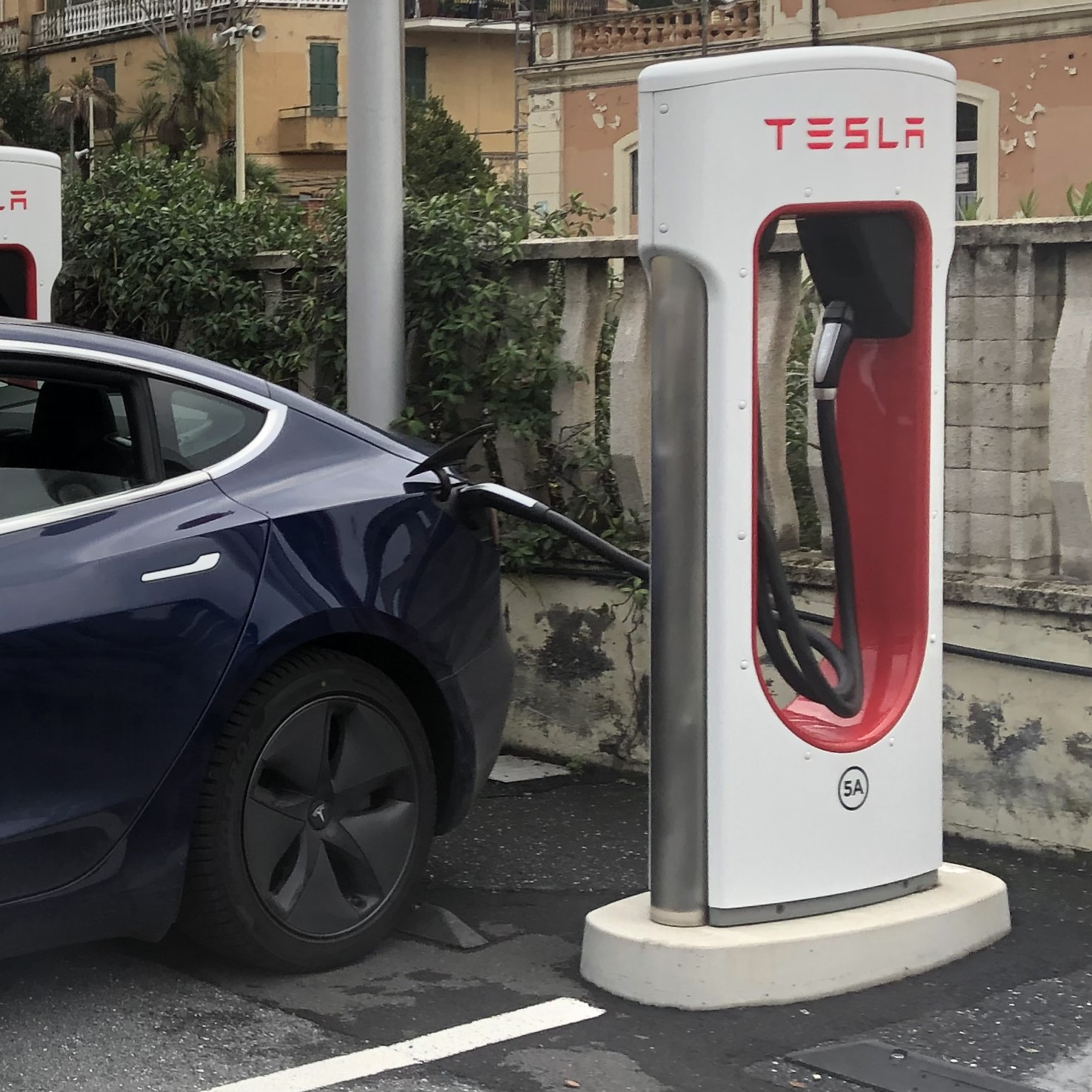
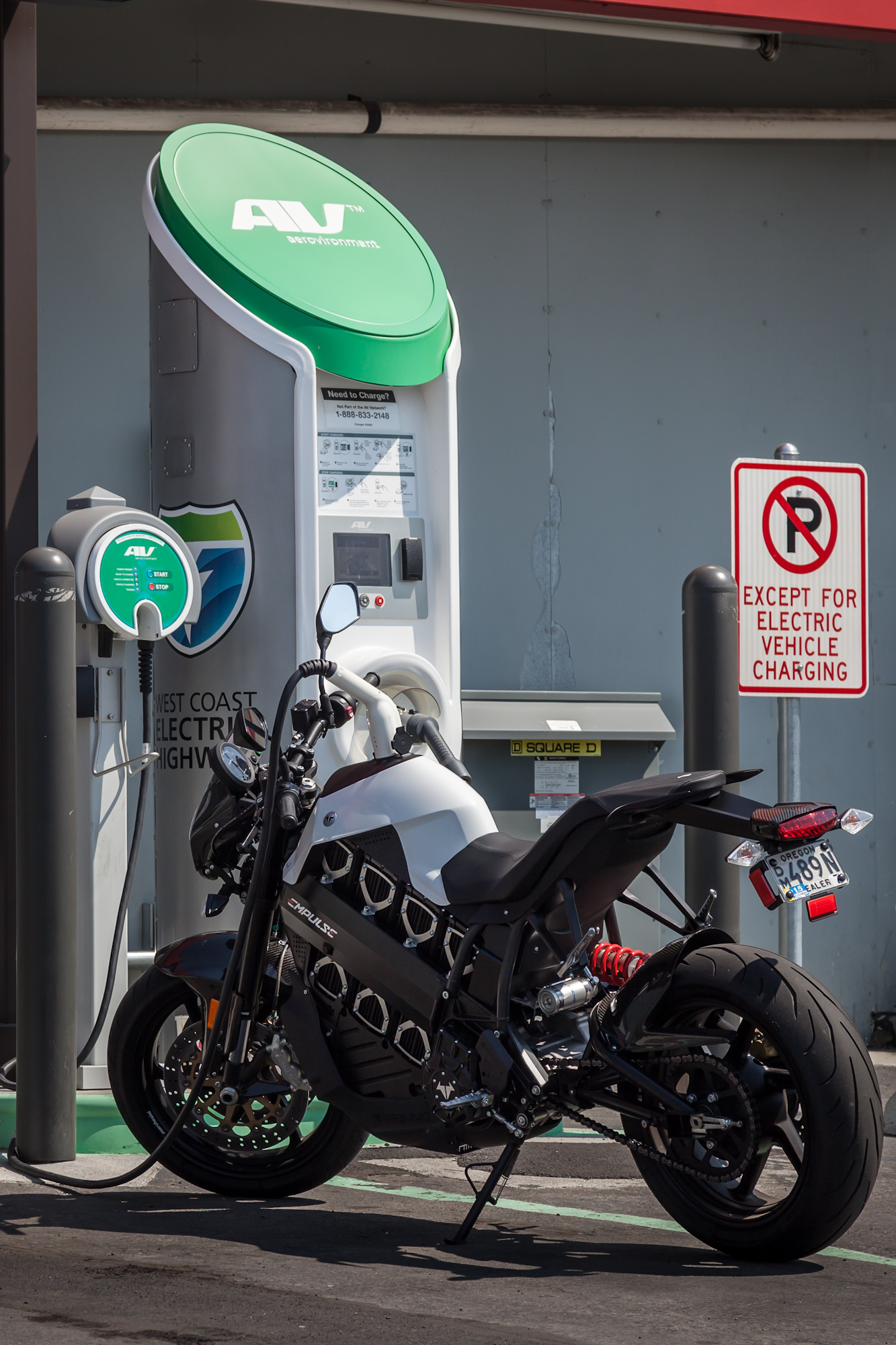
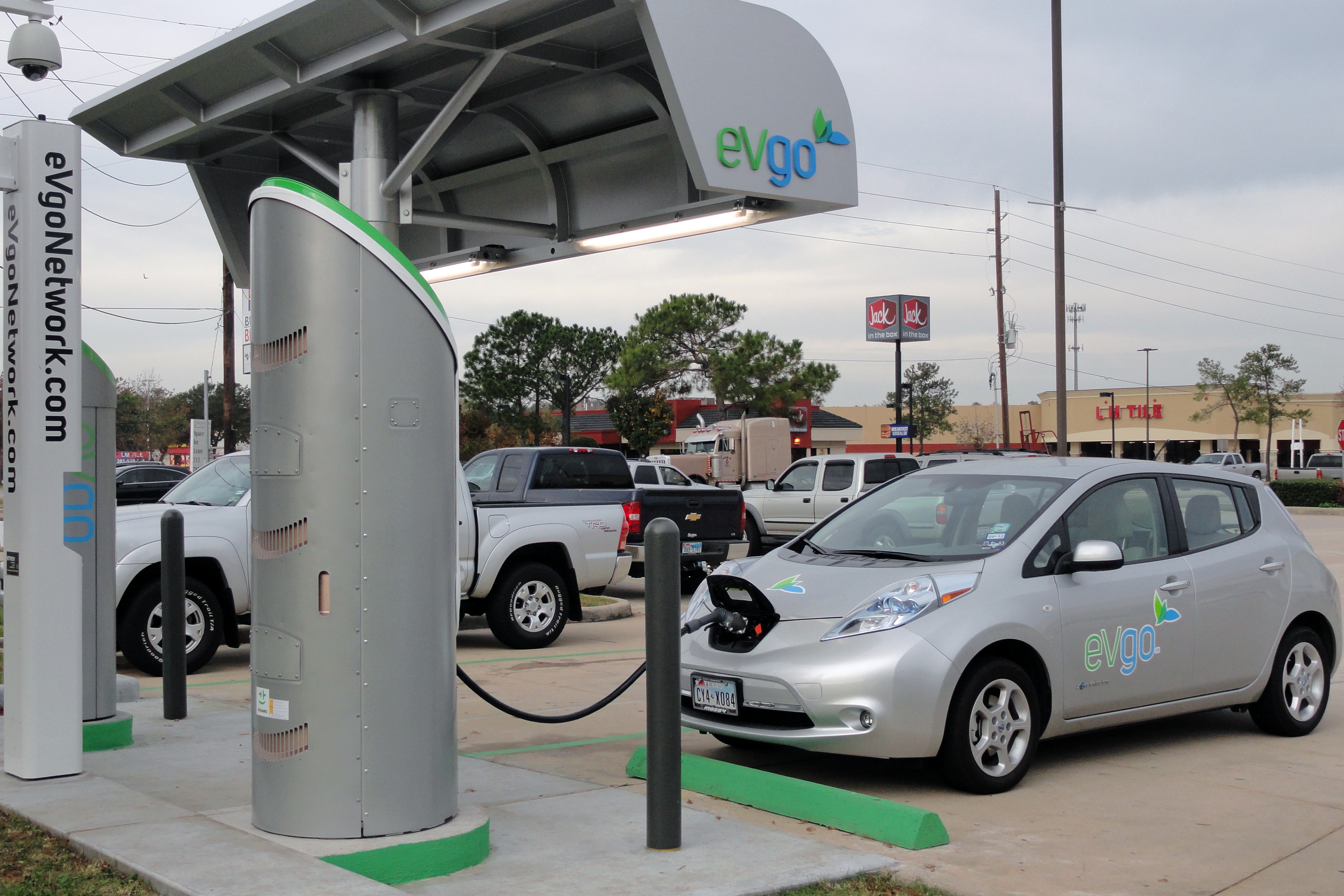
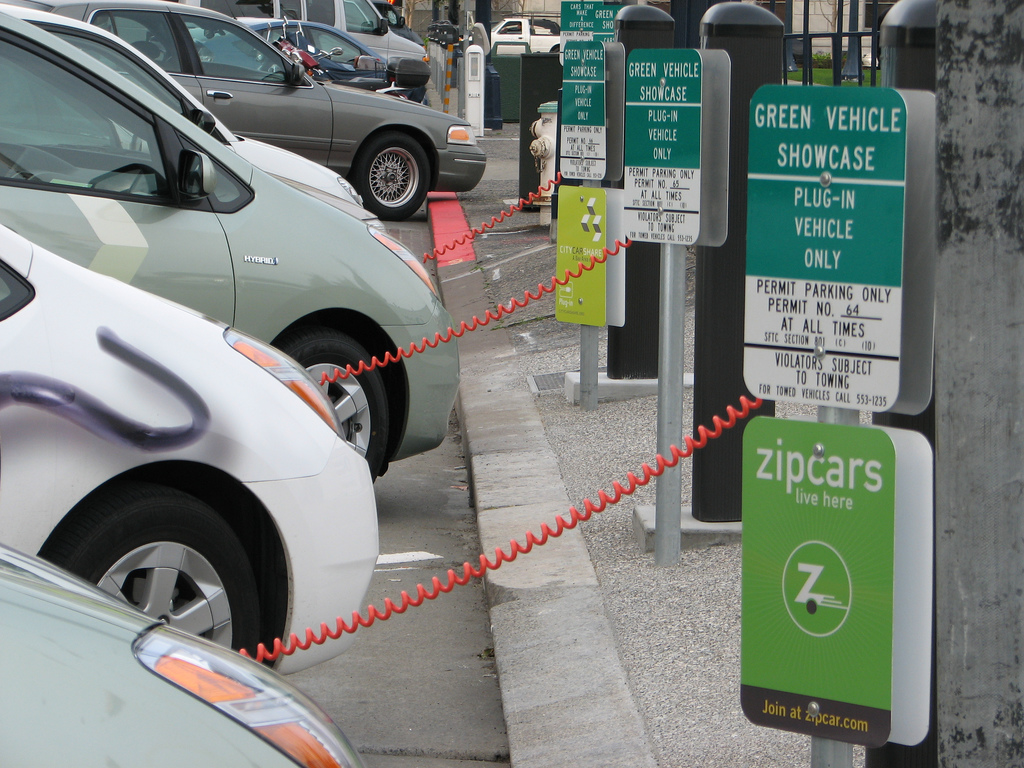
Charging stations for electric vehicles:
- Top-left: Tesla Model 3 being charged at a Tesla Supercharger in Imperia, Italy.
- Top-right: Brammo Empulse electric motorcycle at an AeroVironment charging station and Pay as you go electric vehicle charging point.
- Bottom-left: Nissan Leaf recharging from a NRG Energy eVgo station in Houston, Texas.
- Bottom-right: converted Toyota Priuses recharging at public charging stations in San Francisco, California (2009).

A charging station, also known as a charge point, chargepoint, or electric vehicle supply equipment (EVSE), is a power supply device that supplies electrical power for recharging the onboard battery packs of plug-in electric vehicles (including battery electric vehicles, personal electric vehicles, electric trucks, electric buses, neighborhood electric vehicles, and plug-in hybrid electric vehicles). Charging stations can theoretically be installed anywhere accessible by the electrical grid, including dedicated public charging facilities, multistorey car parks, private garages and carports, and even roadside parallel parking spots.

There are two main types of EV charging stations: alternating current (AC) chargers and direct current (DC) chargers. Electric vehicle batteries can only be charged by direct current electricity, while most mains electricity from the power grid is delivered as alternating current. For this reason, most electric vehicles have a built-in AC-to-DC converter commonly known as the "onboard charger" (OBC). At an AC charging station, AC power from the grid is supplied to this onboard charger, which converts it into DC power to recharge the battery. DC chargers provide higher-power charging (which requires much larger AC-to-DC converters) by integrating the converter into the charging station, thereby avoiding size, weight, and cost constraints in vehicles. The station then directly supplies DC power to the vehicle, bypassing the onboard converter. Most modern electric vehicles can accept both AC and DC power.

Technical standards set the connectors, power levels and safety rules, and they differ by region. The main ones are SAE J1772 and IEC 62196 (Type 1 and Type 2), the Combined Charging System (CCS), CHAdeMO, China's GB/T, and Tesla's North American Charging Standard (NACS). A Megawatt Charging System has been developed for heavy trucks. Because standards compete, many DC stations offer more than one connector.

Public charging networks have grown fastest in China, which has the world's largest charging network. By July 2024 it had about 10.6 million charging stations, of which 3.2 million were public and 7.4 million private. In January 2023, S&P Global Mobility estimated that the United States had about 126,500 Level 2 and 20,400 DC fast-charging stations, plus about 16,800 Tesla Superchargers and destination chargers.

=== Battery swapping ===
Instead of recharging EVs from electric sockets, batteries could be mechanically replaced at special stations in a few minutes (battery swapping).

Batteries with greater energy density such as metal–air fuel cells cannot always be recharged in a purely electric way, so some form of mechanical recharge may be used instead. A zinc–air battery, technically a fuel cell, is difficult to recharge electrically so may be "refueled" by periodically replacing the anode or electrolyte instead.

=== Bidirectional charging ===
General Motors (GM) is adding a capability called V2H, or bidirectional charging, to allow its new electric vehicles to send power from their batteries to the owner's home. GM will start with 2024 models, including the Silverado and Blazer EVs, and promises to continue the feature through to model year 2026. This could be helpful to the owner during unexpected power grid outages because an electric vehicle is a giant battery on wheels.

== Considerations ==
=== Environmental impact ===
Since 1991, the cost of lithium-ion batteries has declined by 99%. On average, the price declined about 19% for each doubling of installed capacity.

EVs release no tailpipe air pollutants, and reduce respiratory illnesses such as asthma. By reducing types of air pollution, such as nitrogen dioxide, EVs could also prevent hundreds of thousands of early deaths every year, especially from trucks and traffic in cities. Additionally, EVs have significantly less noise pollution in urban areas, improving the quality of life overall.

The carbon emissions from producing and operating an EV are, in the majority of cases less, than those of producing and operating a conventional vehicle. When pursuing a cost-responsive electric charging strategy (instead of an emission-responsive charging strategy), considerably higher emissions might arise as embedded carbon emissions from electricity are dynamic. EVs in urban areas almost always pollute less than internal combustion vehicles.

However, EVs are charged with electricity that may be generated by means that have health and environmental impacts. This is particularly relevant in places that rely on coal-powered electricity grids. It also has negative environmental impacts due to the manufacturing and recycling of batteries. The full environmental impact of electric vehicles includes the life cycle impacts of carbon and sulfur emissions, as well as toxic metals entering the environment.

Despite that, ICE vehicles use far more raw materials over their lifetime than EVs. One source estimates that over a fifth of the lithium and about 65% of the cobalt needed for electric cars will be from recycled sources by 2035. On the other hand, when counting the large quantities of fossil fuel non-electric cars consume over their lifetime, electric cars can be considered to dramatically reduce raw-material needs.

One limitation of the environmental potential of EVs is that simply switching the existing privately owned car fleet from ICEs to EVs will not free up road space for active travel or public transport. Electric micromobility vehicles, such as e-bikes, may contribute to the decarbonisation of transport systems, especially outside of urban areas which are already well-served by public transport.

==== Mining, extraction and production ====
Information regarding the sustainability of the production process of batteries has become a politically charged topic. Business processes of raw material extraction in practice raise issues of transparency and accountability of the management of extractive resources. In the complex supply chain of lithium technology, there are diverse stakeholders representing corporate interests, public interest groups and political elites that are concerned with outcomes from the technology production and use. One possibility to achieve balanced extractive processes would be the establishment of commonly agreed-upon standards on the governance of technology worldwide.

The compliance of these standards can be assessed by the Assessment of Sustainability in Supply Chains Frameworks (ASSC). Hereby, the qualitative assessment consists of examining governance and social and environmental commitment. Indicators for the quantitative assessment are management systems and standards, compliance and social and environmental indicators.

Rare-earth metals (neodymium, dysprosium) and other mined metals (copper, nickel, iron) are used by EV motors, while lithium, cobalt, manganese are used by the batteries. In 2023 the US State Department said that the supply of lithium would need to increase 42-fold by 2050 globally to support a transition to clean energy. Most of the lithium-ion battery production occurs in China, where the bulk of energy used is supplied by coal-burning power plants.

The extraction and processing of these metals contributes to habitat destruction and environmental degradation. For instance, the process of mining minerals such as lithium and cobalt, essential components of current battery chemistries, carries significant localized environmental hazards. Lithium mining, frequently conducted using water-intensive brine extraction, contributes to global carbon emissions, estimated at over 1.3 million tonnes of carbon annually, with every tonne of mined lithium equating to 15 tonnes of CO_{2} released into the atmosphere. In regions rich in cobalt, such as the Democratic Republic of Congo, environmental costs are substantial, including deforestation, habitat destruction and water pollution. Scientists have noted high radioactivity levels in some mining regions, and industrial processes, including the pulverization of rock, release dust that causes respiratory health issues for nearby populations. Open-pit nickel mining has led to environmental degradation and pollution in developing countries such as the Philippines and Indonesia. In 2024, nickel mining and processing was one of the main causes of deforestation in Indonesia.

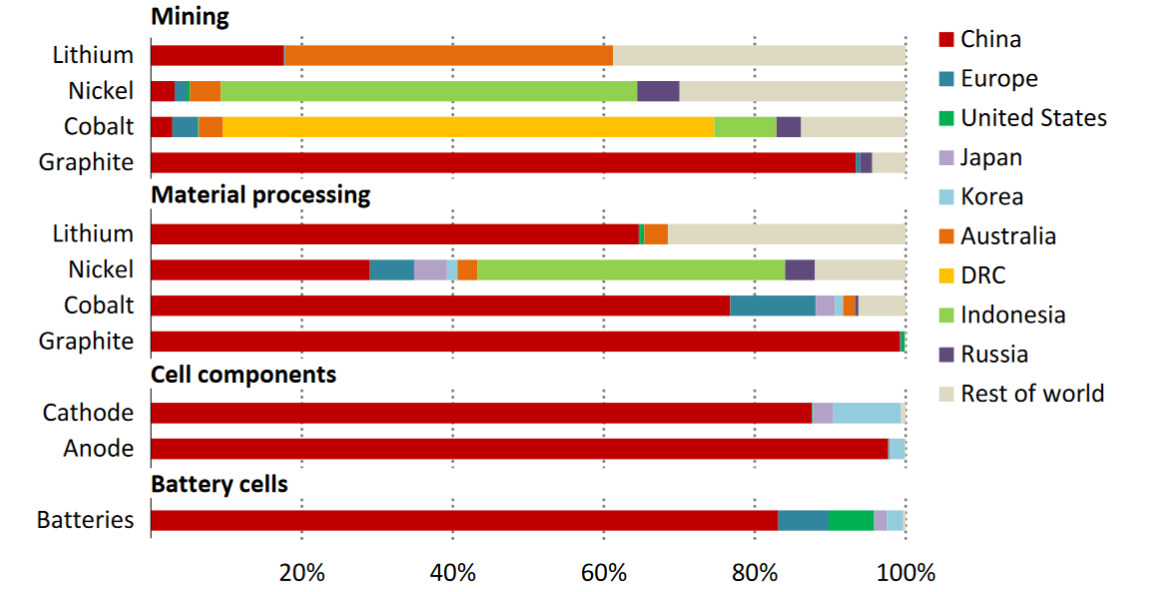
Geographical distribution of the global battery supply chain

In 2022, the International Energy Agency released a report that claims the manufacturing of an EV emitted on average about 50% more CO_{2} than an equivalent internal combustion engine vehicle, but this difference is more than offset by the much higher emissions from the oil used in driving an internal combustion engine Vehicle over its lifetime compared to those from generating the electricity used for driving the EV.

==== Life-cycle assessment ====
Despite the initial manufacturing footprint, a life-cycle assessment (LCA) approach consistently confirms that electric vehicles yield superior overall lifetime greenhouse gas (GHG) performance compared to equivalent ICE vehicles. The extent of the environmental benefit is intrinsically linked to the carbon intensity of the electricity grid used to power the vehicle. In regions like China, battery electric vehicles currently achieve approximately 40% lower emissions compared to ICE vehicles over their full lifespan. However, in countries with high-intensity grids, such as India, the immediate advantage is more modest, resulting in only about 20% lower emissions (saving less than 10 tonnes of CO_{2} equivalent). This context is temporary, as significant efforts are underway globally to decarbonize electricity generation; for instance, the emissions intensity of India's grid is projected to fall by 60% by 2035, rapidly increasing the environmental benefit of electrification.

An alternative method of sourcing essential battery materials being deliberated by the International Seabed Authority is deep sea mining, however carmakers are not using this as of 2023. Regulatory mechanisms, such as the EU Battery Regulation (Regulation (EU) 2023/1542), were introduced to reduce the environmental impact. It covers the entire battery life cycle, from design and production to use and end-of-life management, and from 18 February 2027 requires each electric vehicle battery placed on the market or put into service to have an electronic record called a "battery passport". There are also national policies like those in France, which cap subsidies based on vehicle production carbon intensity.

=== Energy efficiency ===
EV 'tank-to-wheels' efficiency is about a factor of three higher than internal combustion engine vehicles. Energy is not consumed while the vehicle is stationary, unlike internal combustion engines which consume fuel while idling. In 2022, EVs enabled a net reduction of about 80 Mt of GHG emissions, on a well-to-wheels basis, and the net GHG benefit of EVs will increase over time as the electricity sector is decarbonised.

Well-to-wheel efficiency of an EV has less to do with the vehicle itself and more to do with the method of electricity production. A particular EV would instantly become twice as efficient if electricity production were switched from fossil fuels to renewable energy, such as wind power, tidal power, solar power, and nuclear power. Thus, when "well-to-wheels" is cited, the discussion is no longer about the vehicle, but rather about the entire energy supply infrastructure – in the case of fossil fuels this should also include energy spent on exploration, mining, refining, and distribution.

The lifecycle analysis of EVs shows that even when powered by the most carbon-intensive electricity in Europe, they emit less greenhouse gases than a conventional diesel vehicle.

=== Range ===
Electric vehicles may have shorter range compared to vehicles with internal combustion engines, which is why the electrification of long-distance transport, such as long-distance shipping, remains challenging. As of 2025 practical electric aircraft are small and limited to a few hundred kilometres.

=== Cost of ownership ===
Electric vehicles with low worldwide market share, such as ships, typically carry a higher initial purchase price than comparable ICE vehicles. This elevated upfront cost constitutes a significant barrier to entry. While long-term financial analyses may favor EVs, the immediate capital outlay often dictates purchasing decisions, slowing the pace of the overall market transition.

The higher initial price is often offset by superior total cost of ownership (TCO) over the vehicle's lifespan. Operational expenses for EVs are markedly lower.

=== Battery longevity and replacement ===
Advances in lithium-ion batteries, driven at first by the personal-use electronics industry, allow full-sized, highway-capable EVs to travel nearly as far on a single charge as conventional cars go on a single tank of gasoline. Lithium batteries have been made safe, can be recharged in minutes instead of hours (see recharging time), and now last longer than the typical vehicle (see lifespan). The production cost of these lighter, higher-capacity lithium-ion batteries is gradually decreasing as the technology matures and production volumes increase. Research is also underway to improve battery reuse and recycling, which would further reduce the environmental impact of batteries. Many companies and researchers are also working on newer battery technologies, including solid state batteries and alternate technologies.

The risk of requiring an out-of-warranty battery replacement represents the greatest source of long-term financial uncertainty for many prospective EV retail owners. Despite consumer anxieties, actual battery replacement events are statistically rare, and modern EV batteries are demonstrating significantly greater durability than initially anticipated. Studies have confirmed that EV batteries can outlast the vehicle's lifetime with minimal degradation.

The financial risk associated with future replacement is collapsing due to advancements in battery manufacturing and economics. Industry reports project that global market oversupply will persist through 2028, accelerating price reductions.

=== Performance in extreme climates ===
Electric vehicle range and battery performance are negatively affected by extreme cold, as ambient temperatures necessitate diverting energy for cabin heating and maintaining optimal battery temperature. A comprehensive winter performance study by the Canadian Automobile Association (CAA) revealed that cold weather significantly impacts driving range, with vehicles experiencing reductions between 14% and 39% compared to their official estimates when operated at −15^{∘}C. This quantifiable range loss presents a significant practical challenge for owners in cold climates. However, as the industry matures, increasing standardization and optimization of these thermal systems are expected to mitigate cold weather range anxiety.

==== Heating ====
A heat pump system, capable of cooling the cabin during summer and heating it during winter, is an efficient way of heating and cooling EVs. For vehicles which are connected to the grid, battery EVs can be preheated, or cooled, with little or no need for battery energy, especially for short trips. Most new electric cars come with heat pumps as standard.

=== Safety ===
Electric vehicle safety regulations have evolved significantly since the initial UN ECE Regulation 100. Current regulations focus on thermal runaway protection, with various international standards mandating advance warning systems and thermal propagation containment measures.

Recent technological developments address thermal runaway concerns more proactively. Advanced fire protection materials for EV batteries have become a critical research area, with developments in ceramics, mica, aerogels, coatings, and phase change materials designed to prevent or delay thermal runaway propagation.

Current regulations vary by region, with China being an early adopter of thermal runaway-specific requirements mandating prevention of fire or smoke exiting battery packs for five minutes after an event occurs. However, industry experts suggest longer escape times may be necessary for future regulations, with original equipment manufacturers targeting extended protection periods to pre-empt future regulatory requirements.

Research published in the British Medical Journal indicates that electric cars hit pedestrians at twice the rate of petrol or diesel vehicles due to being quieter.

=== Repair shops ===
The infrastructure for vehicle repairs after accidents is a concern for insurers and mechanics due to safety requirements. Although no fatalities have been reported in electric vehicle repair till year 2024, repairing the high voltage battery includes electrical injury, arc flash and fire hazard. Batteries and other components must be carefully evaluated rather than being totally written off by insurers.

=== Socio-economic ===
A 2003 study in the United Kingdom found that "[p]ollution is most concentrated in areas where young children and their parents are more likely to live and least concentrated in areas to which the elderly tend to migrate," and that "those communities that are most polluted and which also emit the least pollution tend to be amongst the poorest in Britain." A 2019 UK study found that "households in the poorest areas emit the least NOx and PM, whilst the least poor areas emitted the highest, per km, vehicle emissions per household through having higher vehicle ownership, owning more diesel vehicles and driving further."

The transport planner for The Netherlands, Karel Martens, in a 2009 article warned that electric vehicles only solve the problem of emissions by cars while not solving or improving their impact on the amount of space used by cars or parking issues. Martens who is of the field of Transport Justice, also said that electric vehicles do not improve accessibility to people who do not own cars.

== Government incentivization ==
The adoption of electric vehicles is a significant state and federal priority, and major goals have been established in America. For example, "the Biden Administration has set a target that 50% of new vehicle sales be electric by 2030." Along with that, California wants all newly sold vehicles to be emission free by 2035. Globally, different governments, municipalities, and companies are creating different ways to encourage the integration of EVs. Many countries will ban sales of fossil fuel road vehicles between 2025 and 2040. The IEA suggests that taxing inefficient internal combustion engine vehicles could encourage adoption of EVs, with taxes raised being used to fund subsidies for EVs.

Many governments offer incentives to promote the use of electric vehicles, with the goals of reducing air pollution and oil consumption.Some incentives intend to increase purchases of electric vehicles by offsetting the purchase price with a grant. For example, the US Inflation Reduction Act (IRA) provides a credit of up to $7,500 for the purchase of new clean vehicles that meet strict battery and mineral requirements. This gives the push car manufactures need to transition into the future of electric vehicles quickly. Other incentives include lower tax rates or exemption from certain taxes, and investment in charging infrastructure.

As of 2026, most European countries offer financial incentives to encourage commercial EV adoption. Partnerships between EV manufacturers and utility companies have also provided incentives and sales on EV purchases to promote cleaner energy usage and transportation. Companies selling EVs have partnered with local electric utilities to provide large incentives on some electric vehicles. In Canada, the government provides direct funding to emission free public transportation like school buses through the Zero emission Transit Fund. Along with financial incentives, governments are putting in an effort to adopt emission free transportation via gas emission mandates. Globally, governments are setting maximum allowable carbon dioxide emissions and minimum fuel efficiency levels. For instance, the European Union's "Fit for 55" policy enforces a 55% reduction (relative to 2021) in carbon dioxide emissions for newly sold passenger vehicles by 2030. The policy also enforces zero emission requirements for public transit buses. The UK's Zero Emission Vehicle (ZEV) Mandate requires car manufacturers to sell an increasing amount of EVs each year. The end goal is to have 100% of newly made vehicles be emission free by 2035.

== Infrastructure management ==
With the increase in number of electric vehicles, it is necessary to create an appropriate number of charging stations to supply the increasing demand. While the deployment of public charging infrastructure is accelerating globally, the adoption rate of EVs risks outpacing network expansion, leading to potential future congestion. Experts concur that large-scale EV adoption will inevitably stress local distribution networks if charging is conducted randomly during peak hours of electricity demand. This unmanaged demand risks grid instability and necessitates proactive management from utilities.

In the United States, charging ports saw quarterly increases between 4.6% and 6.3% in early 2024. However, projections indicate a measurable risk of insufficient density. In the US, the ratio of electric light-duty vehicles per public charging point is projected to climb dramatically from approximately 18:1 in 2023 to over 80:1 by 2035. This sharply increasing ratio confirms that current deployment, while active, may be structurally insufficient to prevent charging queues unless aggressive government targets, such as the US objective of 500,000 public charging ports by 2030, are met and exceeded.

Policy mandates are driving targeted deployment to alleviate infrastructure pressure. Countries like India have set requirements for installing chargers every 25 km along major highways. Logistical hurdles regarding charge times are being addressed by rapid advancements in charging technology. Commercially available DC fast charging stations currently deliver 250–350 kW, and regulatory frameworks, such as the EU's Alternative Fuels Infrastructure Regulation (AFIR), are preparing for the eventual commercialization of 1 MW charging stations. The transition to 1 MW charging, however, requires significant investment in both installation and grid upgrades.

=== Stabilization of the grid ===
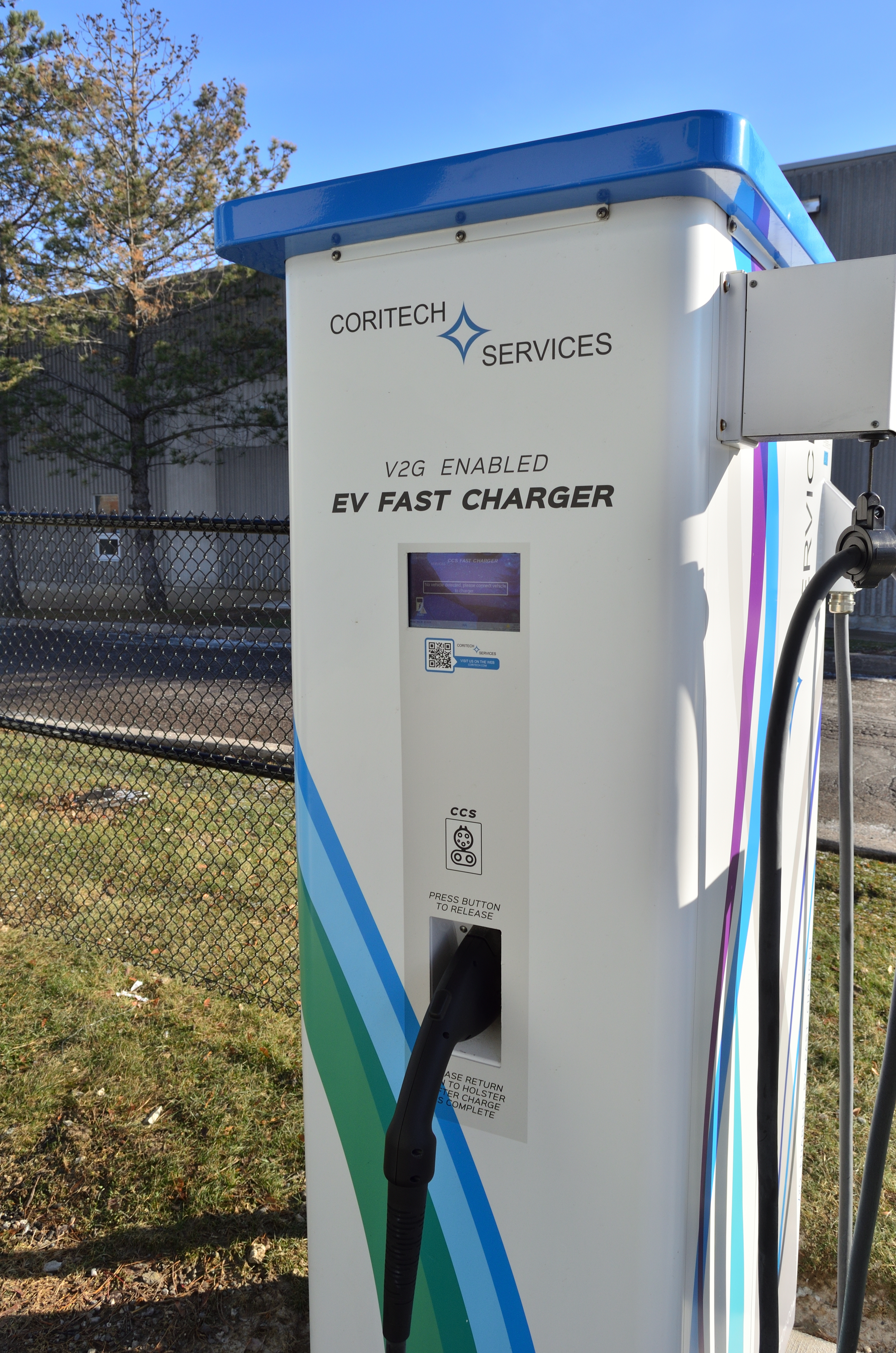
Vehicle-to-grid (V2G) charger where energy can flow back into the grid if needed

Since EVs can be plugged into the electric grid when not in use, battery-powered vehicles could reduce the need for dispatchable generation by feeding electricity into the grid from their batteries during periods of high demand and low supply (such as just after sunset) while doing most of their charging at night or midday, when there is unused generating capacity. This vehicle-to-grid (V2G) connection has the potential to reduce the need for new power plants, as long as vehicle owners do not mind reducing the life of their batteries, by being drained by the power company during peak demand. Electric vehicle parking lots can provide demand response.

Current electricity infrastructure may need to cope with increasing shares of variable-output power sources such as wind and solar. This variability could be addressed by adjusting the speed at which EV batteries are charged, or possibly even discharged.

Some concepts see battery exchanges and battery charging stations, much like gas/petrol stations today. These will require enormous storage and charging potentials, which could be manipulated to vary the rate of charging, and to output power during shortage periods, much as diesel generators are used for short periods to stabilize some national grids.

== In-development technologies ==
Conventional electric double-layer capacitors (supercapacitors) continue to be developed to achieve higher energy densities while maintaining their characteristic fast charging capabilities and extended lifespans. Recent research has focused on solid-state supercapacitor configurations that eliminate liquid electrolytes, providing enhanced safety and design flexibility. Advanced developments include all-graphene oxide flexible solid-state supercapacitors with enhanced electrochemical performance, achieving areal capacitances of 14.5 mF cm⁻² among the highest values for any graphene-based supercapacitor.

Recent breakthroughs include dual storage mechanism nanoscale solid-state lithium-ion supercapacitors using atomic layer deposition-synthesized lithium phosphorus oxynitride (LiPON) as solid-state electrolyte, demonstrating capacitance densities of 500 nF·mm⁻² with excellent cycling stability over ten thousand cycles. High-performance solid-state supercapacitors have been developed using silicon electrodes with graphene interconnected networks, showing remarkable performance characteristics comparable to high-power carbon-based supercapacitors.

Advanced hybrid designs include all-solid-state planar micro-supercapacitors based on 2D vanadium nitride nanosheets and cobalt hydroxide nanoflowers, achieving energy densities of 12.4 mWh cm⁻³ and power densities of 1,750 mW cm⁻³. Flexible solid-state supercapacitors operating across wide temperature ranges from -70 °C to 220 °C have been demonstrated using polycation-polybenzimidazole blend electrolytes doped with phosphoric acid.

=== Battery advancements ===
Solid-state batteries represent one of the most promising next-generation battery technologies, offering potential advantages over conventional lithium-ion batteries including higher energy density, faster charging, improved safety, and longer lifespan. According to a comprehensive review in Chemical Engineering Journal, all-solid-state lithium batteries using solid electrolytes are regarded as the next generation of energy storage devices, with recent breakthroughs significantly accelerating their path toward commercial viability.

The Fraunhofer ISI Solid-State Battery Roadmap 2035+, developed with contributions from more than 100 European experts, provides a comprehensive assessment of solid-state battery development potential over the next decade, benchmarking against established lithium-ion batteries. According to market analysis published in Scientific Talks, solid-state batteries are projected to reach mass production with costs of 140–175 USD per kWh by 2028–2030, depending on technological and manufacturing challenges.

Recent commercial developments include Mercedes-Benz and Factorial Energy conducting road tests of semi-solid-state batteries in the EQS sedan, promising a 25% increase in range with energy densities of 391 watt-hours per kilogram. This represents the world's first integration of lithium-metal solid-state batteries into a production vehicle. However, according to IEEE Spectrum analysis, solid-state batteries face significant "production hell" challenges, with experts noting pointed skepticism toward current technical announcements and the engineering obstacles that lie ahead.

Toyota continues to lead development efforts, targeting solid-state battery production by 2027–2028 with goals of 1,000 km range and 10-minute fast charging capabilities. The company claims recent technological advancements have overcome previous battery life trade-offs and switched focus to mass production readiness. Research published in ACS Energy Letters emphasizes that while all-solid-state batteries show promise for electric vehicles, significant challenges remain in Li-metal implementation, interfacial stability, and large-scale manufacturing.

Sodium-ion batteries continue to show promise with potential energy densities of 400 Wh/kg and minimal expansion/contraction during charge cycles, while relying on more abundant and cost-effective materials than lithium-ion technology. Recent research published in Energy & Fuels highlights sodium-ion and all-solid-state sodium batteries as promising choices for future energy storage systems due to abundant sodium resources and lower costs compared to lithium-based systems.

==== Battery management and intermediate storage ====
Another improvement is to decouple the electric motor from the battery through electronic control, using supercapacitors to buffer large but short power demands and regenerative braking energy. The development of new cell types combined with intelligent cell management improved both weak points mentioned above. The cell management involves not only monitoring the health of the cells but also a redundant cell configuration (one more cell than needed). With sophisticated switched wiring, it is possible to condition one cell while the rest are on duty.

=== Electric roads ===
Three types of electric road systems. An electric truck (black) traveling along a road (gray) receives power: (A) with three inductive pickups (red) from a strip of resonant inductive coils (blue) under the road surface; (B) with a current collector (red) sliding over a ground-level power supply rail segment (blue) flush with the road surface; (C) with an overhead current collector (red) sliding against a powered overhead line (blue)

An electric road system (ERS) is a road which supplies electric power to vehicles travelling on it. Common implementations are overhead power lines above the road, ground-level power supply through conductive rails, and dynamic wireless power transfer (DWPT) through resonant inductive coils or inductive rails embedded in the road. Overhead power lines are limited to commercial vehicles while ground-level rails and inductive power transfer can be used by any vehicle, which allows for public charging through a power metering and billing systems. Of the three methods, ground-level conductive rails are estimated to be the most cost-effective.

==== National electric road projects ====
Government studies and trials have been conducted in several countries seeking a national electric road system (ERS) network.

Korea was the first to implement an induction-based public electric road with a commercial bus line in 2013 after testing an experimental shuttle service in 2009, but it was shut down due to aging infrastructure amidst controversy over the continued public funding of the technology.

United Kingdom municipal projects in 2015 and 2021 found wireless electric roads financially unfeasible.

The Swedish Transport Administration electric road program started assessing electric road systems (ERS) in 2013. After receiving ERS construction offers in excess of the project's budget in 2023, Sweden pursued cost-reduction measures for either wireless ERS or rail ERS. The project's final report, published in 2024, recommended against funding a national ERS in Sweden as it would not be cost-effective, unless the technology was adopted by its trading partners such as by France and Germany. Following the report, the project was paused.

Germany found in 2023 that the wireless electric road system (wERS) by Electreon collects 64.3% of the transmitted energy, poses many difficulties during installation, and blocks access to other infrastructure in the road. Germany trialed overhead lines in three projects in the 2010s and 2020s and reported they are too expensive, difficult to maintain, and pose a safety risk.

France found similar drawbacks for overhead lines as Germany did. France began several electric road pilot projects in 2023 for inductive and rail systems. Ground-level power supply systems are considered the most likely candidates.

== See also ==
- Electric rickshaw – Electric passenger vehicle
- Electriquette – Electric vehicle
- Neighborhood Electric Vehicle (NEV) – US category of microcar
- Polluter pays principle – Principle in environmental law
- Alternative fuel vehicle – Vehicle not powered by petrol or diesel
- Vehicle classification by propulsion system
- Personal electric vehicle (PEV) – Ridable small motorised road vehicles
