= Karel Martens (transport planner) =

Dutch transport and urban planner

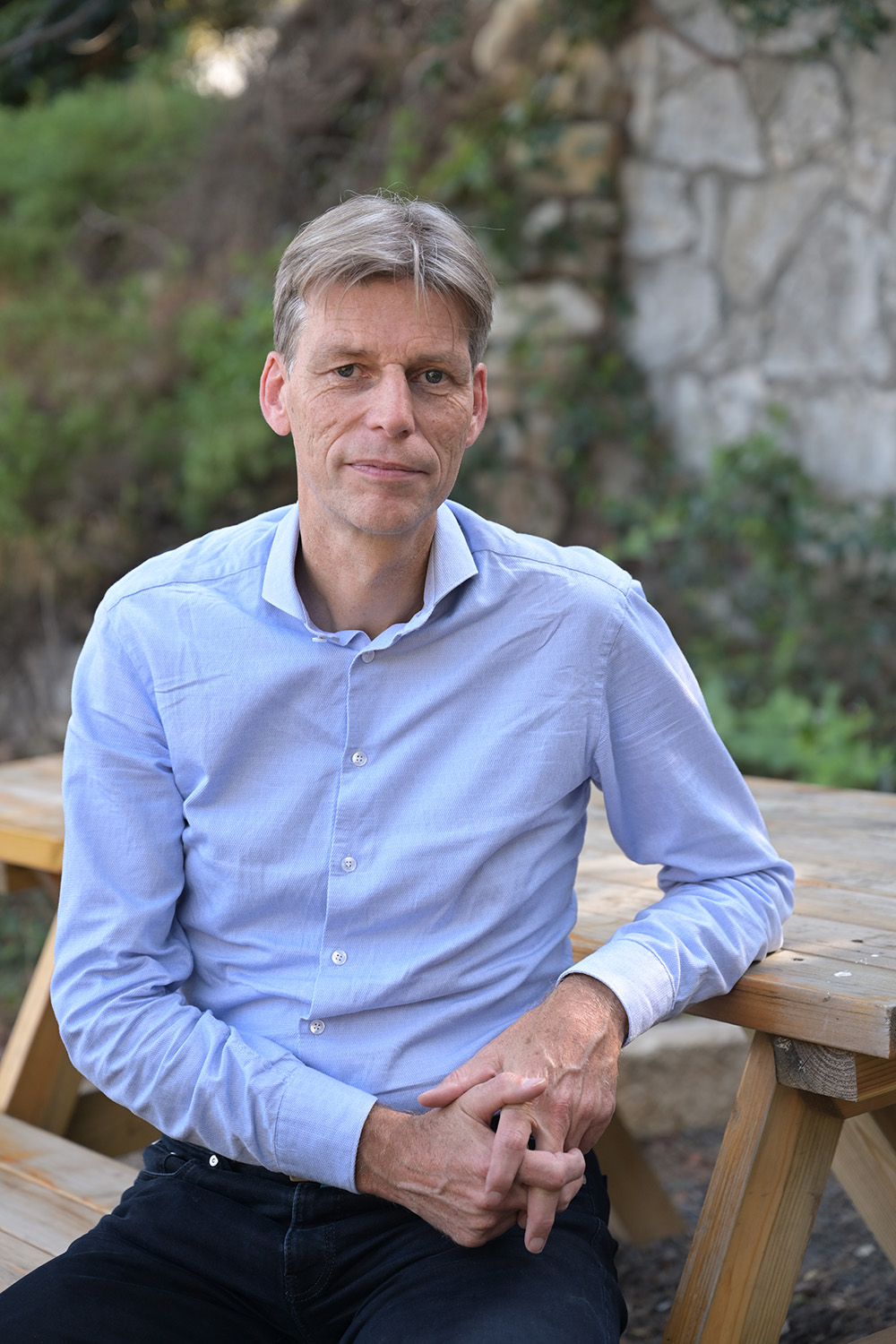
- Born: 1967 (age 58–59); Netherlands
- Citizenship: Dutch
- Education: Radboud University Nijmegen (BSc, MSc, PhD)
- Occupation: Spatial planning Transport planning
- Organization: Technion – Israel Institute of Technology
- Known for: Transport justice theory
- Notable work: Transport Justice: Designing fair transportation systems Measuring Transport Equity
- Title: Dean of the faculty of Architecture and Town Planning of the Technion.; Full Professor.; Dr.
- Movement: Justice and equity in Transportation
- Honours: Transport planner of the year, Netherlands, 2014
- Website: Official website

Karel Martens (born 1967) is a Dutch urban and transport planner who is a professor of transport planning and is currently the dean of the Faculty of Architecture and Town Planning at the Technion – Israel Institute of Technology in Haifa, Israel. He holds the David J. Azrieli Chair in Architecture and Town Planning and directs the Fair Transport Lab. Martens is considered a pioneer of the field of transport justice in which planners integrate ethical principles into the planning and assessment of transportation systems. Martens is the most cited scholar in the field of transport justice.

== Biography and career ==
=== Education and professional career ===
Martens studied at Radboud University Nijmegen, where he earned a bachelor's degree in spatial planning, cum laude, in 1986, and completed his master's degree in urban and regional planning with distinction, and a Ph.D. in policy sciences in 2000. He was a Lady Davis Post-Doctoral Research Fellow in the Faculty of Architecture and Town Planning in the Technion. Martens worked and was then head of Transport Today & Tomorrow, based in Israel.

=== Academic career ===
Since 2000, Martens has been based at the Technion – Israel Institute of Technology as a faculty member in the Faculty of Architecture and Town Planning.From 2002 to 2006 Martens was a research fellow in the Environmental Simulation Laboratory in Tel Aviv University. From 2012 to 2019 he was an associate professor in Radboud university. From 2015 to 2021 he was associate professor in the Technion. In 2022 he was made a full professor in the Technion. Since 2022 he holds the David J. Azrieli Chair in Architecture and Town Planning and directs the Fair Transport Lab. In 2024 he was appointed Dean of the faculty of architecture and town planning in the Technion, he is tasked with overseeing both undergraduate and graduate programs, fostering interdisciplinary research across architecture, engineering, and social sciences. As part of his academic work, Martens has developed graduate courses on transport justice, equity appraisal methods, and mobility rights. His academic work has been described by fellow urban and transport planners as revolutionary, "ground-breaking", a "revolution", and a "landmark".

== Fair Transport Lab ==
Martens founded and heads the Fair Transport Lab at the Technion, a research group dedicated to investigating the distributive impacts of transportation systems on various social groups. The Lab undertakes both philosophical inquiries into mobility rights and empirical analyses of public transit equity, seeking to translate justice-based frameworks into actionable planning tools. It collaborates with policymakers and practitioners worldwide to address issues such as fare policy, access to employment, and the measurement of mobility risk.

== Transport Justice ==
A major work of Martens's scholarship is his monograph, Transport Justice: Designing fair transportation systems published by Routledge, in 2016, which critiques performance-oriented planning metrics and proposes a justice-based approach grounded in the sufficiency principle guaranteeing a minimum level of accessibility for all. Martens based his theories on earlier works from Rawls, Dworkin, and Walzer. Martens articulates distributive, procedural, and relational dimensions of transport justice, challenging planners to embed equity at every stage of policy and project appraisal.

Martens argues in his book that people who already enjoy sufficient accessibility should themselves pay for the costs of further improvements in their accessibility. A road widening based on road tax and fuel excise duty paid by all motorists is not fair from that perspective. Those who still want to tackle traffic jams could do so by introducing "high occupancy toll lanes" that are fully financed by the users themselves (including construction, maintenance and management). Such "high occupancy toll lanes" consist of lanes where the toll amount depends on the traffic density at the time, so that those who are prepared to pay (considerably) more can move faster and thus 'enjoy' a higher level of accessibility.

Martens is the most cited scholar in the field of transport justice.

=== On electric cars ===
In 2009, Martens warned that the advent of electric and self-driving cars could lead to renewed investment in roads, in part because environmental concerns will no longer be a brake on such investment. However, Martens argued that such policies overlook the fact that electric vehicles only solve the emissions problem, while other issues such as the space occupied by cars, parking pressure, and road safety remain in full force. Even more importantly from Martens' perspective, electric cars do not contribute in any way to improving the accessibility of people who do not have access to a car. The self-driving car does have the potential to improve road safety, but makes little contribution to solving the other issues.

== Selected publications ==
- Martens, K. Transport Justice: Designing fair transportation systems. Routledge, 2017.
- Lucas, K. & Martens, K., Measuring Transport Equity. Elsevier, 2019.
- Martens, K., "Justice in transport as justice in access: applying Walzer’s ‘Spheres of justice’ to the transport sector", Transportation, 39(6): 1035–1053, 2012.
- Martens, K., "The role of the bicycle in limiting transport poverty in the Netherlands", Transportation Research Record, 2387(1): 20–25, 2013.
- Martens, K. & Di Ciommo, F., "Travel time savings, accessibility gains and equity effects in cost–benefit analysis", Transport Reviews, 37(2): 152–169, 2017.

== Honors and awards ==
- Transport Professional of the Year (Netherlands, 2014)
- Leona Chanin Career Development Chair (Technion, 2015)
