= Transport Justice: Designing fair transportation systems =

Book on transport justice

- Author: Karel Martens
- Language: English
- Genre: Non-Fiction, Transportation planning
- Publisher: Routledge
- Publication date: 2016
- Publication place: United Kingdom
- Media type: Print (hardcover and paperback)
- Pages: 256
- ISBN: 9781317599586

Transport Justice: Designing Fair Transportation Systems is a 2016 book by Dutch transport planner Karel Martens, published by Routledge. It introduces a justice-based framework for transportation planning, emphasizing equitable accessibility over traditional performance metrics. The book argues that the field had previously been focused on the performance of the system rather than the people who actually use transportation, reflecting a new paradigm in transportation planning.

== Overview ==
In Transport Justice, Karel Martens introduces a new approach to transportation planning centered around principles of justice. Martens critiques traditional planning practices, highlighting how the primary emphasis on improving transportation system performance has frequently neglected the actual needs of many users who use the transportation system. As a result, some groups have benefited significantly from these improvements, while others have faced worsening conditions, leading to significant disparities in mobility and accessibility.

Martens draws from philosophical ideas of social justice of Dworkin and Rawls to propose that governments have an essential responsibility to ensure equitable transportation access for nearly all individuals. His approach advocates placing people, rather than system efficiency, at the heart of transportation planning, aiming explicitly to reduce social inequalities. Transport Justice addresses both transportation planners and students, and seeks to provide a framework that prioritizes justice and equity in designing fairer transportation systems.

The book is structured into three parts:

- Part I: Introduction Discusses fairness in traditional transportation planning.
- Part II: Philosophical Explorations Explores the social meaning of transportation and the concept of accessibility as a primary good.
- Part III: A New Approach to Transportation Planning Presents a justice-based framework for transportation planning, including a case study on Amsterdam's transportation system.

== Author ==
Karel Martens is a Dutch urban and transport planner, currently serving as the Dean of the Faculty of Architecture and Town Planning at the Technion Israel Institute of Technology. He holds the David J. Azrieli Chair in Architecture and Town Planning and directs the Fair Transport Lab. Martens is recognized for pioneering the field of transport justice due to his integration of ethical principles into transportation planning.

== Reception ==
Karel Martens' Transport Justice: Designing Fair Transportation Systems has been recognized among Book Authority's "100 Best Transportation Books of All Time." Experts and reviewers praised the work for its philosophical depth and practical insights. The Journal of the American Planning Association described the book as long overdue, valuable for academics seeking philosophical discussions on transport justice, practitioners needing practical guidelines, and policymakers looking to address inequities within existing transport planning processes.

Martin Wachs, Distinguished Professor Emeritus at UCLA, commended Martens for effectively applying the philosophical ideas of Rawls and Dworkin to urban transport planning. Urban studies research scholar in Harvard Susan S. Fainstein called the book an "exceptionally important and original" contribution, bridging theoretical concepts of equity with practical transportation policy. Deb Niemeier, an American civil and environmental engineer from UCLA, said Martens has created an innovative analytical framework centered on accessibility and justice. Belgian politician Kris Peeters said, "The choice of subject is therefore in itself already a revolution in our thinking about mobility". Fannie Bélanger-Lemay noted the book’s comprehensive appeal and suggested it could stimulate renewed debates among transportation specialists, academics, students, and activists.

Paola Pucci of Politecnico di Milano noted that the book offers a comprehensive framework for integrating justice into transportation planning.
