= Rezence (wireless charging standard) =

Wireless electrical power transfer standard

- Official Rezence logo, representing the wireless charging standard and the Alliance for Wireless Power (A4WP)
- First published: 2012; 14 years ago
- Organization: WiPower
- License: Open standard
- Copyright: Logo and trademark
- Website: rezence.com rezence.com/vn88 rezence.com/me88/

Official Rezence brandmark, the A4WP uses this mark of interoperability to show that various devices are compatible with Rezence systems.

Rezence (pronounced reh-zense) was an interface standard developed by the WiPower (A4WP) for wireless electrical power transfer based on the principles of magnetic resonance. The Rezence system consisted of a single power transmitter unit (PTU) and one or more power receiver units (PRUs). The interface standard supported power transfer up to 50 watts, at distances up to 5 centimeters. The power transmission frequency is 6.78 MHz, and up to eight devices could be powered from a single PTU depending on transmitter and receiver geometry and power levels. A Bluetooth Low Energy link was defined in the A4WP system intended for control of power levels, identification of valid loads and protection of non-compliant devices.

The A4WP was formed in early 2012 with the intent to create a wireless power transfer standard to compete with the existing Qi standard. Board member companies included Broadcom, Gill Electronics, Integrated Device Technology (IDT), Intel, Qualcomm, Samsung Electronics, Samsung Electro-Mechanics, and WiTricity.

In January 2015 A4WP and the Power Matters Alliance announced that the two organizations intended to merge into the AirFuel Alliance.

== See also ==
- Cordless
- WiPower
- Contactless energy transfer
- Inductive coupling
- Near field communication
- Bluetooth Smart
- Open Dots, a conductive charging standard promoted by Open Dots Alliance
