= Swedish Transport Administration electric road program =

The Swedish Transport Administration electric road program (Swedish: Trafikverkets Program för Elvägar) or Swedish Transport Administration Electrification Program (Swedish: Trafikverkets Program för Elektrifiering) is a program involving the assessment, planning, and implementation of an electric road national infrastructure for Sweden by Trafikverket, the Swedish Transport Administration.

The fact-finding program began in 2012 and assessments of various electric road technologies in Sweden began in 2013. The final report was published in December 2024. It recommended against a national electric road network in Sweden as it would not be cost-effective, and the project was paused.

== Technology ==
TRL (formerly Transport Research Laboratory) lists three power delivery types for dynamic charging, or charging while the vehicle is in motion: overhead power lines, ground level power through in-road or on-road rail, and wireless inductive charging. Overhead power was most technologically mature solution which provided the highest levels of power at the time of the 2018 report, but the technology is unsuitable for non-commercial vehicles. Ground-level power is suitable for all vehicles, with rail being a mature solution with high transfer of power and easily accessible and inspected elements. Inductive charging delivers the least power and requires more roadside equipment than the alternatives. By the late 2010s, infrastructure costs of ground-level rail became lower than overhead lines.

=== Standardization ===
Alstom, Elonroad, and other companies have, in 2020, begun drafting a standard for ground-level power supply electric roads. The European Commission published in 2021 a request for regulation and standardization of electric road systems. Shortly afterward, a working group of the French Ministry of Ecology recommended adopting a European electric road standard formulated with Sweden, Germany, Italy, the Netherlands, Spain, Poland, and others, while leaning toward rail ERS, though the specific rail technology has yet to be standardized.

The Swedish government charged Trafikverket with taking concrete measures on the Sweden-Germany-France cooperation regarding electric roads, and publish annual reports in October 2022, 2023, and 2024, and a final report in October 2025. A report by Research Institutes of Sweden (RISE) recommends that Stockholm County choose the stationary and dynamic charging standards selected by Trafikverket. RISE recommends intra-city dynamic charging infrastructure capable of at least 20 kW so vehicles can gain range while driving on the electric road, for driving on peripheral roads and inter-city infrastructure capable of 300 kW or more for best cost-effectiveness. The Swedish National Road and Transport Research Institute (VTI) similarly recommends a system capable of delivering 300 kW per truck. The French Ministry of Ecology working group recommends 400 kW for 44-ton trucks driving at 90 kilometers per hour along a 2% grade, or at minimum 250 kW so the truck can charge along flat or gently-sloping roads.

The final report of the second Swedish-German research collaboration on electric road systems, CollERS 2, advised Trafikverket to select a single ERS technology, suitable for heavy trucks, with several suppliers who use an existing standard, coordinated with German and French ERS decisions, not necessarily led by the European Union but with their coordination, utilizing an ERS-technology-neutral payment system. In 2024 the CollERS project was renewed and extended to include France.

==== Publication ====
A standard for electrical equipment on-board a vehicle powered by a rail electric road system (ERS), CENELEC Technical Standard 50717, has been published in late 2022. A standard encompassing full interoperability and a "unified and interoperable solution" for ground-level power supply electric road systems, detailing complete specifications for "communication and power supply through conductive rails embedded in the road" is specified in CENELEC technical standard 50740 in accordance with European Union directive 2023/1804. The standard was published in 2025.

== Assessment ==
Assessments of various electric road technologies began in 2013. Initially the Swedish Transport Administration had expected to finish the program's assessment phase by 2022, then begin formulation of the national electric road network the same year, and finish its planning by 2033. The schedule was accelerated in October 2020, when the Swedish government charged a commission with investigating the standardization, construction, operation, maintenance and financing of electric roads in Sweden. A report generated by TRL in association with the Swedish Transport Administration listed available electric road systems, of which KAIST OLEV, Siemens eHighway, Elways, Elonroad, Bombardier PRIMOVE, and Electreon were estimated to be the most commercial-ready, with OLEV and eHighway already possessing a complete system in 2018. After further investigation the readiness level assessments of OLEV and Electreon were lowered. An interim report summarizing the assessment phase was published in February 2021, and a preliminary report on the standardization, construction, operation, maintenance and financing of electric roads was submitted September 2021.

=== Assessed technologies ===
Power estimates for electric road technologies tested by Trafikverket (2021)
Type (and developer)	Power per receiver (and estimate pending further development)	References
Overhead power lines (Siemens)	650 kW (1000 kW)	
Ground-level power supply through in-road rail (Elways and NCC consortium)	200 kW (800 kW)	
Ground-level power supply through on-road rail (Elonroad and ABB consortium)	150 kW (500 kW)	
Wireless power transfer through in-road inductive coils (Electreon)	25 kW (40 kW)	

The first permanent electric road in Sweden was as of 2023 planned to be built on a section of the E20 route between Hallsberg and Örebro. The E20 project was funded at 500-600 million SEK, or about 24-29 million SEK per two lane-kilometers. The procurement process was cancelled as the submitted offers by Electreon and Elonroad exceeded the project's budget. The procurement process was expected to begin again by the end of 2025, but the project's final report submitted in December 2024 recommended against a national electric road network in Sweden as it would not be cost-effective, and the project was paused.

==== Siemens ====
Overhead power lines were first tested through the program, using Siemens eHighway technology. The system was inaugurated in June 2016 in Sandviken municipality near Gävle in central Sweden. A 2-kilometre stretch of the E16 motorway was fitted with trolley wires 5.4 metres above its surface, which supply power at 750 volts DC. Trolleytrucks can connect the power pickups, mounted on mechanical arms or trolley poles, while driving under the wires. The trolley poles allow for a degree of lateral movement, but if the lorry is steered into the outside lane, the trolley poles are lowered automatically and the lorry switches to battery or diesel power. The system as tested is capable of delivering 500 kW of power and has an estimated maintenance period of 20 years.

==== Elways-Evias ====
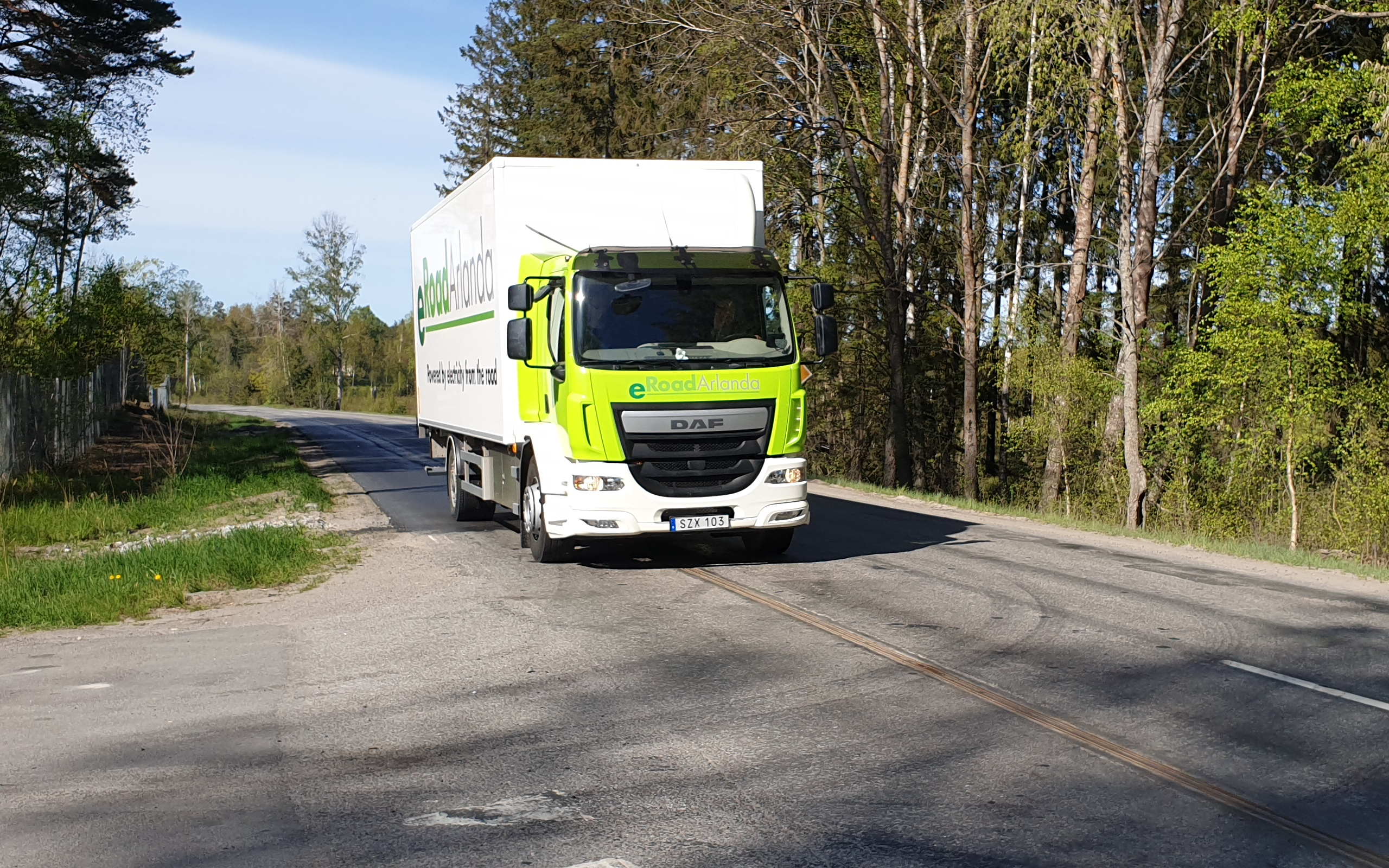
Electric truck driving on a public road with Elways ground-level power supply, near Arlanda airport, 2019.

Ground-level conductive rails were tested from 2017 to 2019, using technology by the company Elways. A 2-kilometre stretch of the 893 road between Arlanda airport cargo terminal and the Rosersberg logistics area was fitted with embedded conductor rails as part of the eRoadArlanda project. Short sections of the rails are energized as a compatible vehicle approaches and they are disconnected once the vehicle has passed. The system measures the energy consumed, so that the vehicle owner can be billed. Buses and trucks were tested on the road, and the system is suited for electric cars, and is safe to touch even when the road is flooded with salt water. "There is no electricity on the surface. There are two tracks, just like an outlet in the wall. Five or six centimetres down is where the electricity is." The system as tested is capable of delivering 200 kW of power and has an estimated maintenance period of 20 years. Evias, which commercializes the technology by Elways, reports that in a pilot with Budpartner initiated in 2021 the infrastructure successfully delivered 960 kW of power, and hopes to deliver megawatts of power for logistics loading docks and electric aircraft in the future.

==== Electreon ====
Trafikverket assessed a wireless electric road system (WERS) with inductive coils using technology by Electreon, an Israeli startup. Testing was scheduled to begin in 2020. The system is made of short sections containing copper coils that energize when a vehicle is driving over them and switch off when it's passed, and it supports power metering and a billing for the energy consumed. The system is estimated to have a maintenance period of 5 years for roadside equipment and about 10 years for in-road equipment.

Electreon first tested receivers nominally capable of up to 25 kW, installing three 25 kW receivers on an electric bus, and subsequently five 20 kW receivers on an electric truck that achieved an average transfer rate of 14 kW per receiver. The pilot was scheduled to conclude in March 2022, however Electreon has requested an extension for another year so it can test receivers nominally capable of 30 kW. Testing has been extended in late 2022 by another two years to assess seasonal damage and maintenance.

==== Elonroad ====
Trafikverket began testing ground-level conductive rails power delivery in 2020 using technology by Elonroad, a Swedish startup located in Lund. The project, EVolutionRoad, was scheduled to begin planning in 2019 and conclude its testing and demonstrations in 2022. The first stretch of road was inaugurated in June 2020 and is the first electric road system placed in an urban environment. The system uses a conductive pickup under the vehicle that connects to a rail on top of the road surface via sliding contacts. The rail is active one meter at a time when covered by the vehicle, making it safe in a city environment. The system measures the energy consumed, so that the vehicle owner can be billed. The system as tested is capable of delivering up to 300 kW with 97% efficiency while driving and it is estimated to have a maintenance period of 10 years. Testing has been extended in late 2022 by another two years to assess seasonal damage and maintenance. At the request of Trafikverket, Elonroad has switched focus in 2023 from rail glued to the surface of the road, or on-road rail, to rail embedded in the road at surface level, or in-road rail, which is better suited for higher vehicle speeds. Testing was concluded in May 2024. Elonroad credits the pilot with paving the way for their participation in the pilot project for electric roads in France.

=== Cost ===
==== Infrastructure ====
Trafikverket estimated the capital costs in million Swedish krona per two lane-kilometers or one road-kilometer in 2021: 12.4 for overhead wires, 9.4-10.5 for in-road rail, 11.5-15.3 for on-road rail, and 19.5-20.8 for inductive coils.

A 2022 paper estimates the capital costs per two lane-kilometers at 1.1M USD for overhead wires, 0.7M USD for in-road rail, and 2.2M USD for inductive coils. This estimate does not account for total installation costs, maintenance costs, and other costs.

The 2024 report by Trafikverket found that the cost estimates quoted earlier in the project relied too much on the manufacturers' estimates. Trafikverket estimates that the costs are at least double what was previously reported. Elonroad estimated in 2024 that two lane-kilometers of in-road ERS rail cost 3.5 to 5 million Euro. Assuming 50% infrastructure coverage along the ERS, it would cost 1.75 to 2.5 million Euro per kilometer road.

==== Maintenance ====
Travikverket estimated in 2020 that other-than-damage maintenance costs are highest for either of the two rail systems, second highest for overhead lines, and lowest for induction. Total annual maintenance costs were estimated in 2021 by the technology providers to be, in terms of percentage per year of the initial capital costs, 0.5% for rail, up to 1% for induction, and 1%-2% for overhead lines. A 2022 paper estimated yearly repair and maintenance cost per kilometer at 16,000 USD for overhead lines, 11,000 USD for in-road rail, and 33,000 USD for inductive coils.

==== Annualized societal cost ====
===== 2019 report =====
A 2019 report by the Swedish Electromobility Centre estimates the annualized societal costs of the entire Swedish automotive fleet under each of the three power delivery systems. Each of the systems was found to result in net savings, with the rail system being the most beneficial. A 2022 research paper by RISE estimates that installing approximately 4,000 km of electric roads that supply at least 150 kW per truck on average is the most economically beneficial option for electric vehicle charging.

Overhead power lines, despite being the most mature technology and, at the time of the 2019 report, having the least expensive infrastructure, are the most expensive overall because they only allow tall commercial vehicles such as trucks and buses to charge while driving, while non-commercial vehicles cannot use the wires to charge while driving, so they will have to use static charging that requires larger batteries with higher capacities than batteries required with the use of dynamic charging. Though overhead lines had the least expensive infrastructure costs when the initial report was written, soon afterward infrastructure costs of ground-level rail became lower than overhead lines.

Ground-level power supplies allow dynamic charging for all vehicles, which greatly reduces the required battery capacity and size since the battery is charged while it is being used. The reduced battery size and capacity reduces cost by about five billion euros annualized for the entire Swedish automotive fleet. The rail and inductive systems are estimated to have equal annualized costs for all components in aggregate other than infrastructure; the conductive rail infrastructure is estimated to cost about 1 billion euros annualized, while wireless inductive infrastructure is estimated to cost about 2.8 billion euros annualized.

The Swedish Transport Administration's regulations for state electric roads proposed in 2021 include estimates for different charging system costs for the customer driving different types of electric vehicles. Long-haul and regional haul trucks were found to incur the least costs with fast charging stations, though the conditions for such a fast-charging network are not currently met and it's not clear if they can ever be met, while passenger vehicles were found to incur the least costs with electric road charging.

===== 2024 report =====
The project's final report submitted in December 2024 recommended against a national electric road network in Sweden as it would not be cost-effective. The annualized societal costs from 2040 to 2070 were found to be higher than the benefits, with a robust degree of certainty. Subsequently, Trafikverket decided to pause the project.

== Planning ==
The switch from the assessment phase to the planning phase was estimated to occur in 2022, but the Swedish government accelerated the program's schedule, and began the planning phase with the creation of the electrification commission in October 2020. The commission investigated the electrification of heavy transport vehicles, fast charging, and the standardization, construction, operation, maintenance and financing of electric roads in Sweden. A report on the chosen electric road infrastructure was expected by September 2021, but the choice was delayed until late 2022 or early 2023, then delayed again to mid or late 2023, and eventually scheduled for December 2024. Regulations for electric roads, independent of the chosen technology, were proposed on September 1, 2021. The final report on the expansion of the Swedish electric road network was published in December 2024. It recommended against a national electric road network in Sweden as it would not be cost-effective unless it was part of a larger network with France and Germany. Following the report, the project was paused.

== Construction and operation ==
=== Legal aspects ===
The Swedish Transport Administration anticipates that a national electric road network would require interfaces between several players: the electricity supplier, the power grid company, the vehicle manufacturer, the road owner, the electric road technology operator, the metering and billing provider, and the user of the electric road. The ownership model can vary: the power grid company may own the secondary roadside electrical substations that power the electric road infrastructure or they may be owned by other players, and the power reading and payment system may be owned by a player separate from the infrastructure operator. ABB formed a consortium that will handle the different aspects of the business model, such as energy metering and billing, for its ground-level power supply technology.

==== Proposed framework ====
The Swedish Transport Agency has been tasked with proposing a technical, financial, and legal framework for the electric road toll system by November 1, 2022. The agency proposes expanding the legal framework of the Stockholm congestion tax for electric road permits, and rolling out the technical framework in stages. For the first permanent electric road the Agency will offer fixed-fee permits for use of the electric road system. As the system gains more users, it will transition to usage-based billing. The infrastructure, along with equipment installed on registered vehicles, will verify the permit and the standing of the permit holder's debts and payments, then allow or disallow drawing power from the electric road system and bill the permit holder appropriately.

=== First permanent electric road ===
The Swedish Transport Administration announced on July 1, 2021, that a section of the E20 route was chosen to be the first permanent electric road in Sweden. The road was expected to begin operation by 2027. Before the project was paused in 2024, an expansion of further 3000 kilometers of electric roads was expected by 2045.

The first permanent electric road in Sweden was as of 2023 planned to be built on a section of the E20 route between Hallsberg and Örebro. An analysis by the logistics firm Novoleap concluded that the electric road on the E20 section between Hallsberg and Örebro will result, for logistics companies, in reduced capital costs for electric fleets, reduced operating costs, and reduced CO_{2} emissions. Novoleap notes that the total cost of the electric road may be positive or negative depending on its capital costs for infrastructure, its annual maintenance costs, and its delivered power per vehicle; 200 kW of power per truck is adequate, but higher levels of power such as 400 kW and 800 kW are more beneficial and might be required in the long term. The VTI similarly recommends a system capable of delivering 300 kW per truck. The Swedish Transport Agency has proposed in late 2022 the billing framework for the first permanent electric road, which will initially rely on a permit for a fixed fee. As the system gains more users, it will transition to usage-based billing.

Trafikverket has made an initial selection of procurement providers by April 2022. the choice of technology was expected to be announced by early 2023 with work beginning in March 2023, but the choice was delayed to mid to late 2023. Trafikverket was expected to announce its chosen technology for electric roads by late 2023, but due to procurement offers exceeding the project's budget, in 2023 Trafikverket began investigating cost-reducing measures in order to realize the project within its budget.

The E20 project was funded at 500-600 million SEK, or about 24-29 million SEK per two lane-kilometers. The procurement process was expected to begin again at the end of 2025, but the project's final report submitted in December 2024 recommended against a national electric road network in Sweden as it would not be cost-effective, and the project was paused.

== See also ==
- Transport in France § Electric roads
