= SAE J2954 =

Wireless power transfer standard for electric vehicles

SAE J2954 is a standard for wireless power transfer (WPT) for electric vehicles led by SAE International. It defines three classes of charging speed, WPT 1, 2 and 3, at a maximum of 3.7 kW, 7.7 kW and 11 kW, respectively. This makes it comparable to medium-speed wired charging standards like the common SAE J1772 system. (Note: For example, a Tesla Model 3 Standard Range using J1772 charges at a maximum of 32 A, or 7.7 kW, equivalent to WPT 2.) A much more powerful WPT9 is being defined in J2954/2 for 500 kW charging for heavy-duty vehicles which have the room necessary to mount the larger induction plate.

The system works along similar principles as inductive charging, but uses the resonant inductive coupling concept with a demonstrated efficiency of around 85%. This makes it similar to wired chargers, where the higher theoretical efficiency is offset somewhat by necessary isolation systems that prevent high-current back-feeding, systems that the air-gapped J2954 does not require. Best-in-class medium-speed chargers are around 94%.

Development of the underlying resonance transfer concept was developed by Marin Soljačić at the Massachusetts Institute of Technology (MIT) and then spun-off as WiTricity in 2007. WiTricity has led the SAE standardization efforts, which began in 2012 and have undergone two Recommended Practice releases as of 2019. The final standard was published in 2020. WiTricity predicts that J2954 chargers will be available as add-on features beginning around 2022.

== History ==
Marin Soljačić had been experimenting with resonant inductive coupling systems for some time when he first used the term WiTricity in a 2006 demonstration where the system was used to send power to a 60W light bulb at roughly 45% efficiency. Continual improvement since that time has improved this to about 90%. The company was spun off from MIT in 2007, initially aiming at the consumer electronics market and car chargers.

Many technology companies invested in the consumer electronics side of the technology, including Intel, Qualcomm, Samsung Electronics and others. This work eventually resulted in the formation of the Rezence standard. The competing Qi standard, based on closer-contact pads, (Note: Qi generally requires the device to be placed directly on the face of the charger surface within a limited area on its face perhaps a few centimeters in area. Rezence allows the device to be within a volume of about 5 cm.) won market acceptance, and only one device, the January 2017 Dell Latitude 7285, was released using the system. Rezence was officially abandoned by Intel in June 2016, and by everyone else in 2017 when WiTricity announced a round of layoffs and refocussed the company on the electric vehicle (EV) market.

Since 2010, when Delphi Automotive announced they were investing in the technology, the system had also been developed for the EV market. In 2011, Toyota announced a major investment in the company. In 2014, Toyota publicized the technology and that year the first 3.3 kW chargers were demonstrated.

In 2011, Qualcomm purchased HaloIPT, a spin-off from the University of Auckland that was also working on resonant charging technology. This system was aimed not only at parked charging, but also using charging systems embedded in road surfaces to charge multiple cars as they drove, a system they referred to as "dynamic electric vehicle charging", or DEVH.

This competitive challenge resulted in the 2012 formation of the SAE efforts, based on WiTricity's technology. The standard adopted the "levels" terminology already used for referring to charging speeds, introducing the WPT 1 through 3 concept. All of the WPT levels correspond to what would be considered Level 2 charging in conventional systems. In addition to the physical and electrical parts of the system, J2954 also standardizes a Bluetooth-based communications standard between the vehicle and charger, methods using triangulation sensors on the car to indicate the proper positioning of the car over the charger pad, the creation of a standardized test stand for vendors to test their vehicle implementations against, and standardized signage to indicate charge points. The standard has since undergone three revisions, 2016's J2954_201605, 2017's J2954_201711, and the most recent 2019 release, J2954_201904.

In 2019, Qualcomm abandoned their Halo efforts, and sold all of the associated intellectual property to WiTricity.

In 2019 special versions of the BMW 530e, available for lease, included a WPT1 charger that used the preliminary J2954 system. The system claimed 85% efficiency over an air gap of 8 cm between the charger plate and vehicle pickup. As of 2020 only a small number of systems were installed.

In August 2024, the SAE published the final standard for J2954. This included an alignment system called Differential Inductive Positioning System (DIPS), which would allow the cars themselves, including autonomous vehicles, to align the wireless components while parking, rather than requiring a human in the loop.

== Description ==
The canonical J2954 system consists of two parts, a charger station and its associated induction pad known as the Ground Assembly (GA), and the vehicle-mounted section known as the Vehicle Assembly (VA).

The GA connects to the grid, changing the grid power from alternating current (AC) to direct current (DC) using a conventional rectifier. The DC output of the rectifier then drives a power inverter that outputs AC at the desired 85 kHz frequency. This AC power is then fed into the induction coil. The GA also contains a BlueTooth-based communications system that it uses to communicate with the charger on the car to determine maximum rate of charge, charge state, and other information.

The VA is essentially a mirror of the GA, with the exception that it converts the AC from the coil to DC and then uses that to charge the batteries directly. This means that a different receiver is needed for each vehicle, as battery-pack voltages and charging systems vary widely.

One of the major efforts within the J2954 standard that did not originate within WiTricity is the Vehicle Proximity Detection system. After considering a wide variety of options, the "minimum common alignment method" adopted the idea of leaving the otherwise-idle GA induction coil powered at a very low level. The VA's coil receives an even lower amount of power from this signal even at distances on the order of several meters. Multiple sensors in the VA use this signal to triangulate the pad and display targeting information to the driver on an in-car display.

The existing test harness for the GA uses a circular topology for the charging pad, where the induction coil is arranged as a single large spiral. An alternate topology is the "double-D", in which the coil is arranged as two rounded-rectangles placed side by side in the inductor pad. Using the existing circular coil, the pads can be as far as 250 millimetres (9.8 in) apart vertically, and within 100 millimetres (3.9 in) side-to-side.

== See also ==
- Electric road
- Inductive charging § Electric vehicles
