= Electreon =

Israeli company specialising in wireless chargers for EVs

Electreon infrastructure being installed for a pilot project in 2020 in Tel Aviv along a bus route, so the bus can charge while driving with inductive charging using coils embedded in the road. The bus was charged at a stationary wireless charging spot at the end of its route.

Electreon Wireless Ltd or Electreon (Hebrew: אלקטריאון) is an Israeli company developing inductive charging for electric vehicles through stationary chargers and electric roads. The company has participated in several wireless electric road feasibility studies, such as ones in Israel, Sweden, the United States, and France. Electreon announced in 2026 its first commercial product, a wireless charger for electric vehicles installed as a mat over parking spaces. Twenty units have been manufactured as of October 2026, and Electreon plans to launch the product in mid-2027.

== Company history ==
Electreon was founded in 2013 by Oren Ezer and Hanan Rumbak, both engineers who formerly worked for Elbit Systems. The company became publicly listed on the Tel Aviv Stock Exchange through a reverse merger in 2017. After demonstrating their technology by powering a car with inductive charging for 25 m (82 ft), Electreon received a $12.6 million grant from the Swedish Government in 2019 through the Swedish Transport Administration electric road program. Electreon hired the lobbying services of Corey Johnson in order to receive government grants for its electric road technology in the United States, particularly in the state of New York.

Electreon acquired InductEV in December 2025 by allocating $10.5M in shares to InductEV shareholders after InductEV entered insolvency assignment in August 2025.

== Governance and people ==
The former president of Israel, Reuven Rivlin, was appointed as president of the company in August 2021. His role at the company was "to advance collaborations with governments and global companies and to present its activity to decision makers around the world." However, Electron's market cap shrank by 66 percent in the four years following his appointment, and it was not yet profitable when Rivlin resigned the position four years later, in December 2025. Several other public figures were serving on the company board at the time, including former chief of Israel Police Yohanan Danino (chair), former minister of science and technology Yizhar Shai (director and chief innovation officer); and the former head of he Money Laundering Prohibition Authority, Yehuda Shaffer (director).

As of September 2026, co-founder Oren Ezer is CEO, while Barak Duani is CFO.

== Research and development ==
=== Wireless charging standards ===
Electreon collaborated in the early 2020s on standardization with the Michigan Department of Transportation (MDOT) and WiPowerOne, an offshoot of the KAIST OLEV project. ENRX, which is composed of several companies including IPT, announced in November 2024 that it plans to collaborate with InductEV to standardize dynamic wireless power transfer; InductEV was later acquired by Electreon. An Electreon representative stated in a podcast published in December 2023 that SAE, Electreon, and other organizations were jointly developing a standard for dynamic wireless inductive charging.

=== Effects on road surface ===
Testing of various bonding materials between the inductive coils and the asphalt in 2023 at Nantes showed that Electreon's standard installation techniques of inductive coils under the asphalt were not satisfactory and resulted in critical strains. Performance was satisfactory with the use of specific bonding resins, with non-critical degradation in performance compared to reference pavements with no inductive coils. Despite satisfactory results, even the best-performing methods showed risk of debonding of the casing of the coils from the top layer of the road. ÉTS and Université Laval studied the structural performance of Electreon in-pavement inductive coils in 2025, similarly finding evidence of debonding. The 2023 Nantes trials showed increased risk of thermal damage to the road under regular operating conditions due to the induction coils exceeding temperatures of 100 °C (212 °F). The wireless ERS trial in France along a kilometer on the A10 autoroute used asphalt reinforced with woven fiberglass to meet the road's mechanical requirements and limit premature occurrence of reflective cracks.

=== Feasibility studies ===
Electreon has participated in several electric road feasibility studies. The following list of feasibility studies is sorted by the project's end date:

- United Kingdom, 2021: The Coventry University dynamic charging project DynaCoV found wireless electric roads financially infeasible, using itemized costs provided in 2021 by Electreon. The project found wireless charging is three to ten times more costly than conductive charging.
- Germany, 2023: A bus equipped with inductive coils that receive power from a 200-meter strip of transmitters under the road surface was able to collect 64.3% of the power emitted from the transmitters. Installation proved complex and costly, and finding suitable locations for the coils' roadside power cabinets proved difficult. The Electreon infrastructure blocked access to all civil infrastructure beneath it. Internet access outages caused the wERS infrastructure to stop functioning entirely.
- Swedish Transport Administration electric road program, 2019–2024: Electreon first tested receivers nominally capable of up to 25 kW, installing three 25 kW receivers on an electric bus, and subsequently five 20 kW receivers on an electric truck that achieved an average transfer rate of 14 kW per receiver. The pilot was scheduled to conclude in March 2022, however Electreon applied for an extension for another year so it can test receivers nominally capable of 30 kW. Testing had been extended in late 2022 by another two years to assess seasonal damage and maintenance. The project's final report recommended against a national electric road network in Sweden as it would not be cost-effective, and the project was paused.
- Norway, 2025: Busses equipped with Electreon receivers, nominally capable of 120kW, received an average of 62 to 65 kW.
- Michigan, U.S., 2023–2026: Using data from BRTdata.org for the year 2025, the study found that a wireless charging lane would not be cost-effective for most bus rapid transit (BRT) systems around the world, with the exception of the ones in Beijing, Xiamen, and Bogotá. Cost-effectiveness requires a combination of high fleet utilization and high traffic density: utilization is given by the ratio of traveling buses to the total available bus fleet, and density is given by the number of traveling buses per mile of bus lane. The study assumes a wireless power transfer efficiency of 90%, installation of the minimal length of wireless charging infrastructure required to meet fleet charging needs, and a fixed cost of $3M per wireless charging infrastructure mile and an additional cost of $10k per kW-mile. The study notes that these are best-case estimates. For comparison, an earlier study from Purdue University estimated in 2021 that the cost of a single wireless electric lane at 50% coverage at large-scale deployment is about 6.5 million dollars per mile, or 13 million dollars per mile of wireless charging road infrastructure.
- France, 2023-2027: France began testing electric road technologies in 2023. An initial report by the French government found inductive charging is not a mature electric road technology as it delivers the least power, loses 20%-25% of the supplied power when installed on trucks, and its health effects have yet to be documented. Electreon installed four receivers on a truck, each nominally capable of 80 kW, for a total 320 kW. Power transfer peaked at over 300 kW and averaged 200 kW. Electreon has announced in 2026 that it applied for a follow-up project in order to meet the electric road cost requirements of the French government.

== Products ==
=== Bus charging ===
NDTV reported in May 2026 that Electreon has demonstrated wireless charging for the past three years with a large public transport operator in Israel. The company says the infrastructure allows charging during short stops along the bus routes, rather than having to wait for the buses' batteries to be fully charged using ultra-fast chargers. The system was at that time able to support charging rates of around 90 kW.

=== Heavy-duty truck charging ===
Electreon trialed highway-charging of heavy-duty trucks on the A10 autoroute in France in 2025. An electric truck was equipped with several 40-kilogram 130-by-80-centimeter receivers, which achieved a combined average charging rate of 200 kW while driving along the segment of wireless-charging highway.

=== Charging mat ===
Electreon announced plans in September 2026 to release its first commercial product, an 11 kilowatt wireless charger for electric vehicles installed as a mat over parking spaces. This is equivalent to the output of most private home chargers. The company did not announce its price, availability date, launch market, nor customers. The device is set to compete against similar SAE J2954 wireless chargers for electric vehicles. The product, branded Lite DOT, was shown at the International Motor Show in Hannover, Germany. Twenty units have been manufactured as of October 2026, and Electreon plans to launch the product in mid-2027.
