= Chipseal =

Pavement surface treatment

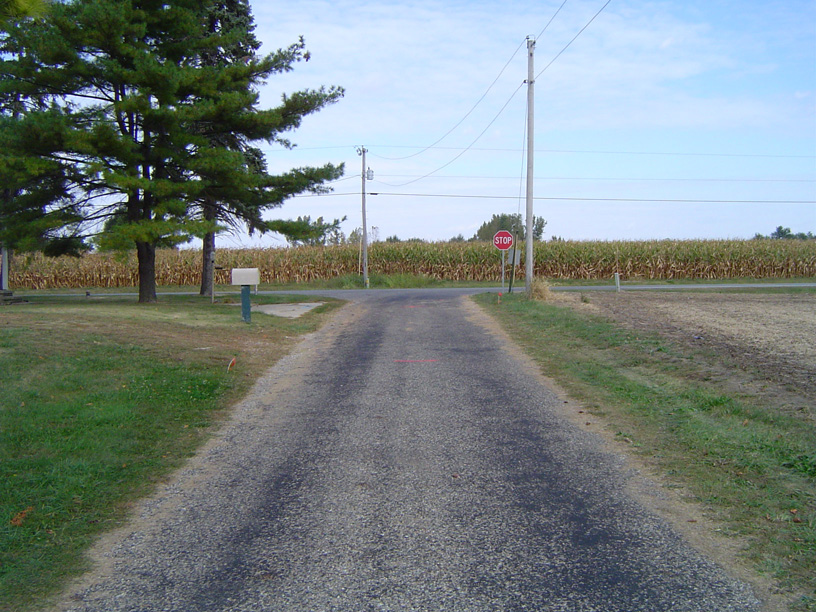
A chipseal road near Kempton, Indiana in the United States

Chipseal (also chip seal or chip and seal or spray seal) is a pavement surface treatment that combines one or more layers of asphalt with one or more layers of fine aggregate. In the United States, chipseals are typically used on rural roads carrying lower traffic volumes, and the process is often referred to as asphaltic surface treatment. This type of surface has a variety of other names including tar-seal or tarseal, tar and chip, sprayed seal, surface dressing, or simply seal.

In Australia as well as New Zealand, chipseal roads are common, including usage on major highways.

== Uses ==
Chipsealing is cheaper than resurfacing an asphalt concrete or a Portland cement concrete pavement, but not as long-lasting.

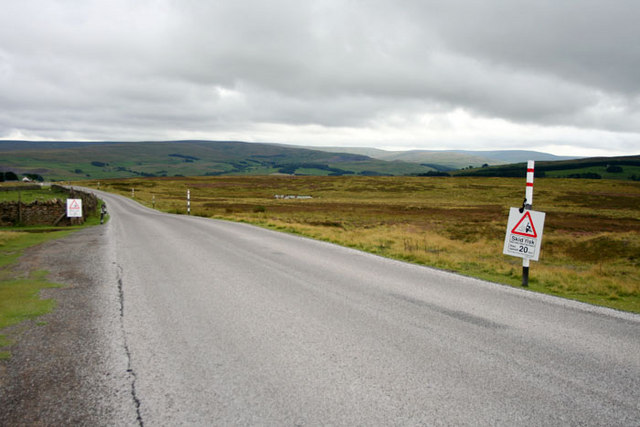
A chipseal road in the United Kingdom

== Installation ==
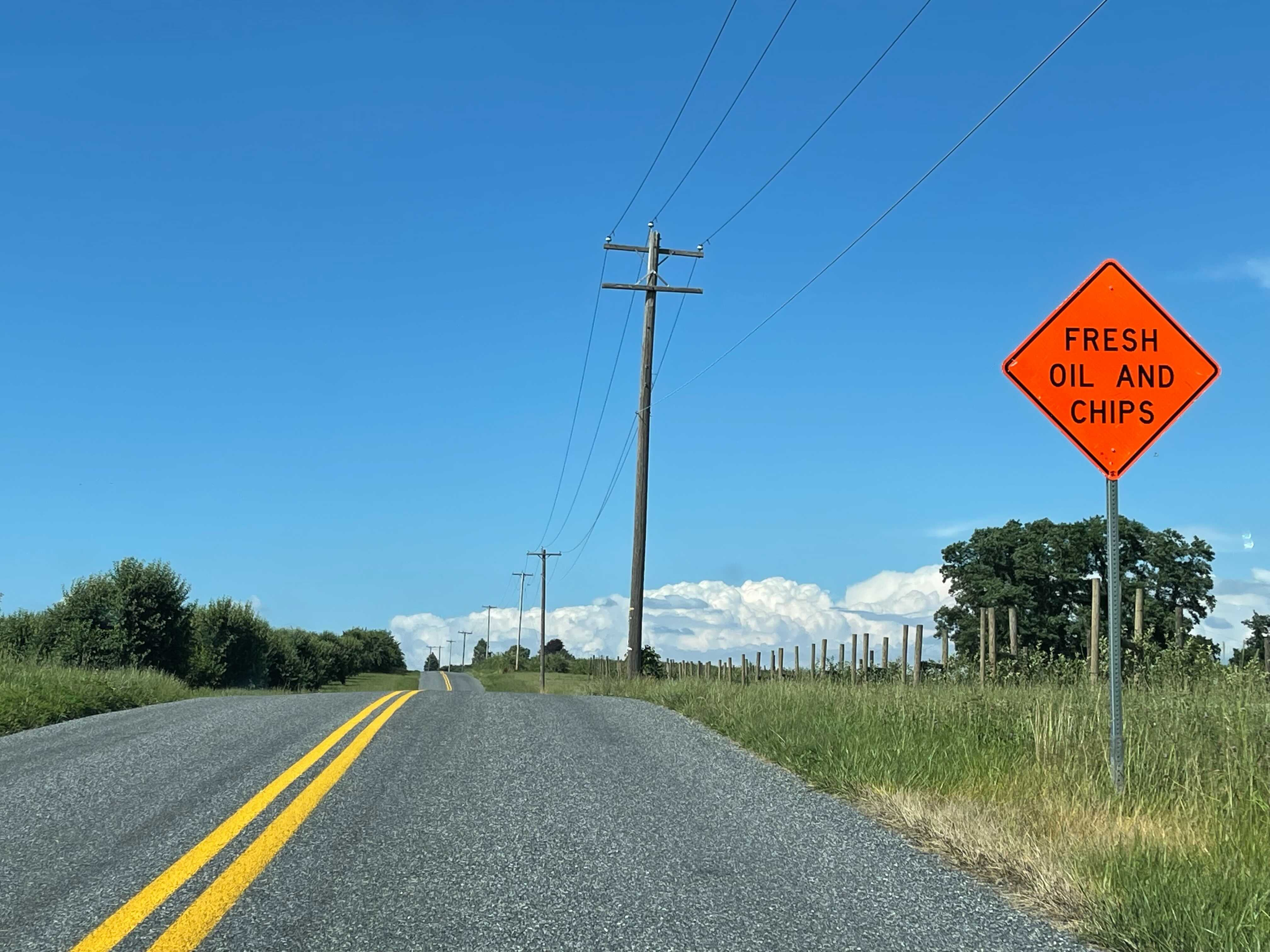
Advisory sign to alert people that not all gravel have been pressed into the surface

Chipseals are constructed by evenly distributing a thin base of hot tar, bitumen or asphalt onto an existing pavement and then embedding finely graded aggregate into it. The aggregate is evenly distributed over the hot seal spray, then rolled into the bitumen using heavy rubber tired rollers creating a paved surface. A chip-seal-surfaced pavement can optionally be sealed with a top layer, which is referred to as a fog seal or enrichment.

The introduction of polymer-modified bitumen and emulsion binder has increased chipseal's ability to prevent crack reflection and improve stone retention by improving the properties of the bitumen binder. Newer techniques use asphalt emulsion (a mixture of liquid asphalt, surfactant, and water) instead of asphalt. This has been shown to help reduce aggregate loss and reduce cost of installation, but can increase stripping (separation of the binder from the aggregate). It reduces emissions of volatile organic compounds (VOCs) due to the lower solvent content. New methods also utilize cross linking styrene acrylic polymers which also provide quality water resistance. Chips precoated with about one percent bitumen have been used successfully to minimize aggregate loss and to give the surface a black look.

It can keep good pavement in good condition by sealing out water, but provides no structural strength and will repair only minor cracks. While the small stones used as surface yield a relatively even surface without the edges of patches, it also results in a very rough surface that leads to louder rolling noise from automobile wheels.

Although chipseal is a cost-effective way to repair roads, it has drawbacks. Loose crushed stone may remain on the surface due to underapplication of bitumen or excess stone. If not removed, this can cause safety and environmental issues such as cracked windshields, chipped paint, crashes (especially for motorcyclists, bicyclists, and small trucks), and clogging of drainage systems. Sweeping the road after the emulsion sets is therefore essential.

=== Chip seal installation over gravel roads ===
Chip seal products can be installed over gravel roads to eliminate the cost of grading, road roughness, dust, mud, and the cost of adding gravel lost from grading. Adding chip seal over gravel is about 25% of the price of resurfacing with asphalt, $170,000 for a 4-mile project done in Minnesota compared to $760,000 had it been redone with asphalt. The surface lasts for 5–7 years. Patch work can be done with a bucket of tar sealer and more chip seal over the top. The chip seal matt surface handles thermal variation well and doesn't crack like asphalt roads. A thin penetrating emulsion primer (PEP) coat is usually applied over the gravel before the chip seal matt is applied.

== Noise and vibrational effects ==
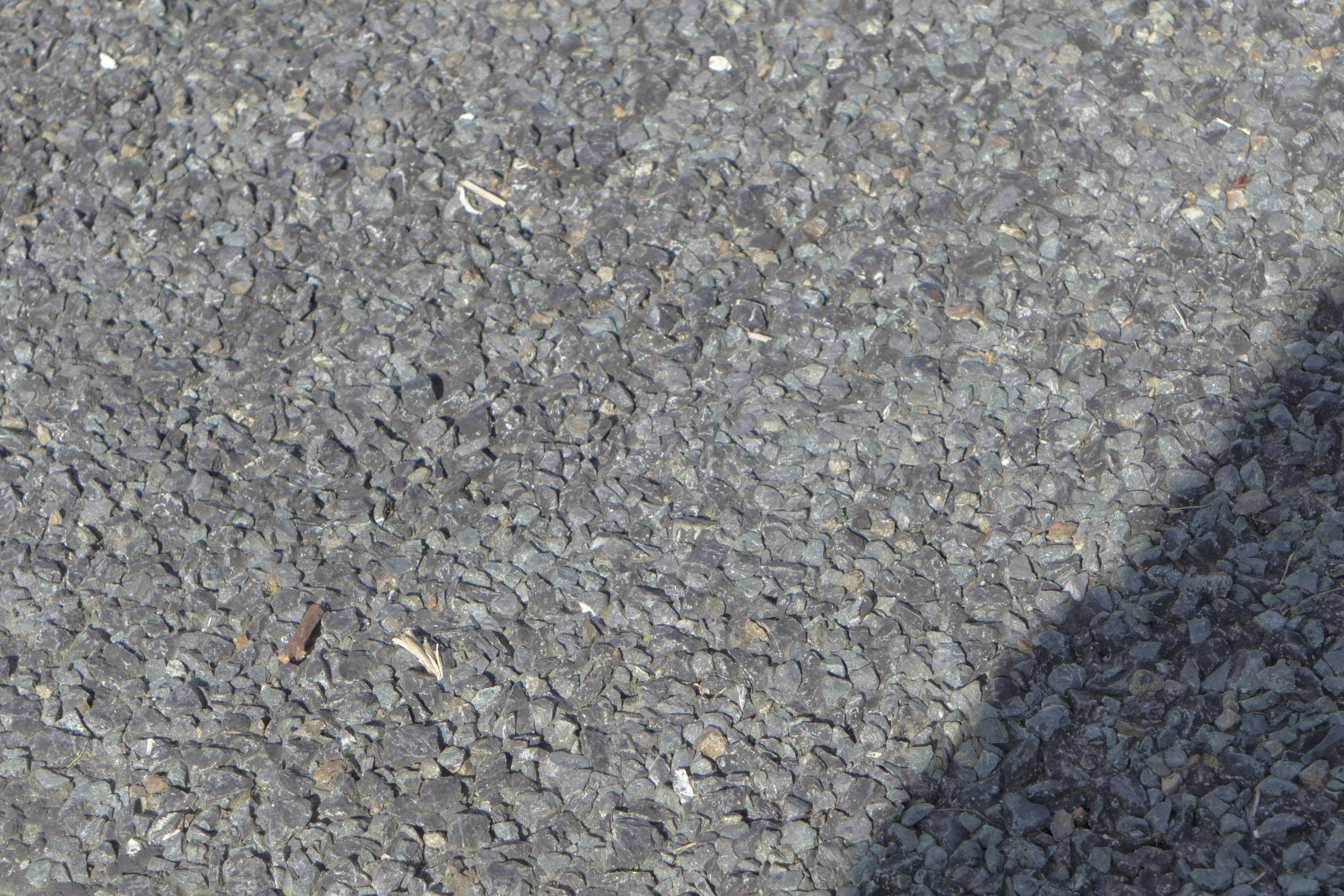
A close-up view of chipseal surface

The rough wearing surface of the chipseal generates more roadway noise at any operating speed than do typical asphalt or concrete surfaces. These sound intensities increase with higher vehicle speeds. There is a considerable range in acoustical intensities produced depending upon the specific tire tread design and its interaction with the roadway surface type.

The rough surface causes noticeable increases in vibration and rolling resistance for bicyclists, and increased tire wear in all types of tires.

Vehicle speed can affect the set up time with chipseal. Shortly after construction (depending on weather conditions) the set speed for chipseal is 10–15 miles per hour (16–24 km/h) for the first 24–48 hours after construction.

== See also ==
- Macadam – Road building method by John Loudon McAdam
- Asphalt – Composite material used for paving
- Bituminous surface – Road covered with durable surface material
