= WiTricity =

Technology company

WiTricity Corporation
- Type: Private
- Industry: Wireless power transfer
- Founded: 2007; 19 years ago
- Founder: Marin Soljačić
- Headquarters: Watertown, Massachusetts, United States
- Key people: Joe Benz (CEO); Morris Kesler (CTO)
- Website: www.witricity.com

WiTricity Corporation is an American wireless charging technology company based in Watertown, Massachusetts. The Massachusetts Institute of Technology (MIT) spin-off was founded by professor Marin Soljačić in 2007. WiTricity technology allows wireless power transfer over distance via magnetic resonance and the company licenses technology and reference designs for wireless electrical vehicle (EV) charging as well as consumer products such as laptops, mobile phones and televisions.

== History ==
The company was established by Massachusetts Institute of Technology (MIT) professor Marin Soljačić in 2007. The MIT spin-off is based in Watertown, Massachusetts. In 2014, WiTricity joined the Alliance for Wireless Power (A4WP), which later merged with the Power Matters Alliance to form the AirFuel Alliance. Alex Gruzen replaced Eric Giler as chief executive officer (CEO) in 2014. Morris Kesler is chief technology officer (CTO). The company is a member of the Wireless Power Consortium.

In 2017, WiTricity began focusing on charging systems for electric vehicles more than consumer technology products. By 2018, WiTricity had partnered with more than a dozen automotive companies, including nine of the world's largest ten, on research and development projects. Audi, Mahle GmbH, and Mitsubishi were among the partnering companies.

In 2018, WiTricity was named a New Energy Pioneer by Bloomberg New Energy Finance. The company acquired the assets and intellectual property rights of Qualcomm Halo and its inductive charging technology in February 2019; the deal included more than 1,000 patents and patent applications, as well as technology designs and licenses, and made Qualcomm a minority owner of WiTricity. In late 2020, MIT and WiTricity filed an infringement lawsuit against the Pennsylvania-based company Momentum Dynamics over seven wireless energy transfer patents. The lawsuit resulted in the invalidation of six of the asserted patents, and WiTricity filed a second infringement suit in March 2023.

=== Funding ===
Prior to Toyota's investment in 2011, WiTricity had raised approximately $15 million. By April 2013, WiTricity had received approximately $45 million in funding. After additional funding rounds in 2015 and 2018, the company had raised $68 million. WiTricity had raised approximately $88 million in venture capital by early 2019. Funders have included Delta Electronics, Foxconn, Haier, Intel, Schlumberger, and Toyota.

In 2020, WiTricity completed a $34 million round led by Stage 1 Ventures with additional participation by Air Waves Wireless Electricity and Mitsubishi subsidiary Mitsubishi Corporation (Americas). The round was extended for an additional $18 million raised in January 2021; Tony Fadell was among the private investors and joined WiTricity's advisory board.

In August 2022, WiTricity completed another round of funding raising $63 million. The round was led by Siemens which invested $25 million and acquired a minority stake in the company earlier in June 2022. Mirae Asset Capital and Japan Energy Fund joined the round along with few other returning investors.

== Technology ==
WiTricity's technology allows wireless power transfer over distance via magnetic resonance. Alternating current (AC) electricity runs through an electromagnetic coil within a charging station to form an oscillating electromagnetic field. Another coil resonating at the same frequency captures the field's energy and a rectifier delivers direct current (DC) current to a battery management system. The technology works through various materials, such as stone, cement, asphalt or wood, and has an energy conversion efficiency end-to-end above 90 percent, equivalent to plugging in. By 2013–2014, electric power output had reached 10 W for mobile devices, 6 kW for passenger vehicles, and 25 kW for fleets and buses. WiTricity's EV has charging rates from 3.6 to 11 kW, and the technology scales up to hundreds of kilowatts for heavy duty vehicles such as buses.

=== Uses ===
WiTricity has reached licensing deals with Anjie Wireless, Delphi (Aptiv), Intel, Mahle, TDK, Toyota, and Zhejiang VIE. Thoratec licensed the technology to produce heart pumps capable of charging automatically. WiTricity has demonstrated wireless charging for consumer products such as laptops, mobile phones, televisions, and solar panel receivers. The company has also shown how the technology can be used to power soldiers' helmets with night-vision goggles wirelessly during Humvee transportation. Dell's 2017 launch of the laptop-tablet Latitude 7285 marked the first commercial consumer product to use the technology.

In 2018, BMW's 530e iPerformance became the first vehicle factory equipped with wireless charging, and Hyundai's Kona also demonstrated use of the technology. In January 2019, Honda and WiTricity demonstrated wireless vehicle-to-grid charging at the Consumer Electronics Show. The technology was also being used for the McLaren Speedtail Hyper-GT by 2020. In May 2020, China published their national standard for EV wireless charging which incorporated WiTricity's technology, and WiTricity played a key role in establishing SAE International's J2954 standard for wireless power transfer.

In 2022, WiTricity received a $50,000 grant from the Michigan Mobility Funding Platform and the State of Michigan to install a wireless charging station at the Detroit Smart Parking Lab, operated by the American Center for Mobility.

The 2022 Hyundai Genesis GV60 uses wireless charging hardware by WiTricity.

In 2022, WiTricity licensed its technology with Wiferion, which develops wireless charging systems for industrial applications such as automated guided vehicles, cobots, and trucks.
