= Power Matters Alliance =

Networking standards organization

- Abbreviation: PMA
- Merged into: AirFuel Alliance
- Formation: March 2012
- Type: Industry Consortium; Technology
- Region served: Worldwide
- Members: Open
- Key people: Ron Resnick (President)

Power Matters Alliance (PMA) was a global, not-for-profit, industry organization whose mission was to advance a suite of standards and protocols for wireless power transfer for mobile electronic devices (specifically a type of inductive charging that competes with the Qi standard). The organization was merged with Alliance for Wireless Power (A4WP) in 2015 to form AirFuel Alliance.

Founded by Procter & Gamble and Powermat Technologies in March 2012, PMA was networking technology companies in order to guarantee consumers interoperable devices which employed wireless power technology. Marked by the electron "P", PMA interface standard described analog power transfer (inductive and resonant), digital transceiver communication, cloud based power management, and environmental sustainability. The PMA board of directors included representatives from AT&T, Duracell, Starbucks, Powermat Technologies, Flextronics, Federal Communications Commission (FCC), and Energy Star. The membership of the PMA was made up of companies across the mobile device ecosystem, including handset providers, service providers, chipset suppliers, manufacturers, test labs and public establishments.

== PMA standard and technology ==
The PMA's stated mission was to formulate and advance a suite of interface standards for smart and energy-efficient transfer of wireless power. The PMA was actively publishing a suite of standards based on inductive coupling technology to provide advanced inductive and resonant power. In addition, the PMA sought to add a digital layer providing policy-setting, monitoring, and extensible APIs. The PMA managed interoperability, certification and logo programs according to these specifications.

On February 11, 2014, the Alliance for Wireless Power (A4WP) and the PMA announced that they signed an agreement calling for the following immediate next steps:

- PMA adopts the A4WP Rezence specification as the PMA magnetic resonance charging specification for both transmitters and receivers in both single and multi-mode configurations
- A4WP adopts the PMA inductive specification as a supported option for multi-mode inductive, magnetic resonance implementations
- A4WP to collaborate with PMA on their open network API for network services management

This agreement was a move toward industry consolidation of wireless charging standards.

=== Acquisition and standards body formed ===
In 2015 the organization was merged with The Alliance for Wireless Power (A4WP) to form the AirFuel Alliance, a global coalition of companies working together to bring next-generation wireless power technologies to market.

=== Key Features ===
- Inductive Coupling
- Digital Transceiver Communication
- Cloud Based Power Management
- PRU Category 1-7. PTU Class 1-6
- PRX Out Max from 3.5W to 50W (Cat. 1 TBD)
- PTX Input Max from 2W to 70W

=== Mark of Interoperability ===
The 'Electron P' mark of interoperability was required to set compatibility standards across markets and industry, and across all links in the delivery chain of the alliance. It was used by industries and companies that adopt and implement the PMA standards. It was displayed at coffee shops, clubs, hair salons, airline terminals, entertainment venues, and on mobile phone accessories.

=== Semi-Annual Conferences and Quarterly PlugFests ===
PMA conducted member conferences.

=== Working Groups ===
Working Group	Description
IPG	The Inductive Power WG is a technical WG that is responsible for the development and maintenance of technical specifications for wireless power technologies based on direct electromagnetic induction.
SWG	The Sustainability WG is an advisory WG whose function is to advise the technical WGs with respect to the requirements that permit the wireless power technologies to fulfill the social, economic, and other requirements of present and future generations (e.g., energy saving, etc.).
RWG	The Regulatory WG is an advisory WG whose function is to advise the technical WGs with respect to the global emissions and coexistence requirements for the PMA technology being developed in support of the development of Wireless Power technologies which are compliant with regional regulatory requirements to the greatest extent possible.
CWG	The Certification WG is a technical WG that is responsible for the establishment of world class certification program with short, medium and long term programs including the development and maintenance of test plans and implementation conformance specifications.
MPG	The Multimode Power Group (MPG) is a technical WG that is responsible for the development and maintenance of technical specifications for multimode operations between the PMA inductive technologies and other PMA endorsed wireless power transfer technologies.
NWG	The Network Working Group (NWG) is a technical committee responsible for the development and maintenance of network communication strategies and protocols for network related functionality of wireless charging spots. The scope of work done in this committee relates to provisioning, operation, administration, management, and user interaction of the network. The work ensures a viable framework to ensure continued growth of the wireless charging ecosystem.
TSC	The TSC is the overall approval and coordinating body for all PMA technical activities conducted in one or more of the technical PMA WGs. The TSC includes appointed leadership, WG Chairs, and Program Office staff.
UPG	UPG is chartered with the leadership and development of standardized specifications for wireless power transfer based on non-magnetic technologies such as RF, ultrasound and laser that deliver power at a distance of up to 10m (30 feet).

== Adoption ==
On June 11, 2014, Starbucks announced plans to provide wireless chargers at its coffeehouses in the United States and to test the wireless chargers in select European and Asian markets.

== See also ==
- Qi, a competing wireless power standard promoted by Wireless Power Consortium
- Rezence, a cooperative wireless power standard promoted by the A4WP
- Open Dots, a competing wireless power standard promoted by Open Dots Alliance
