= Online electric vehicle =

Type of electric vehicle

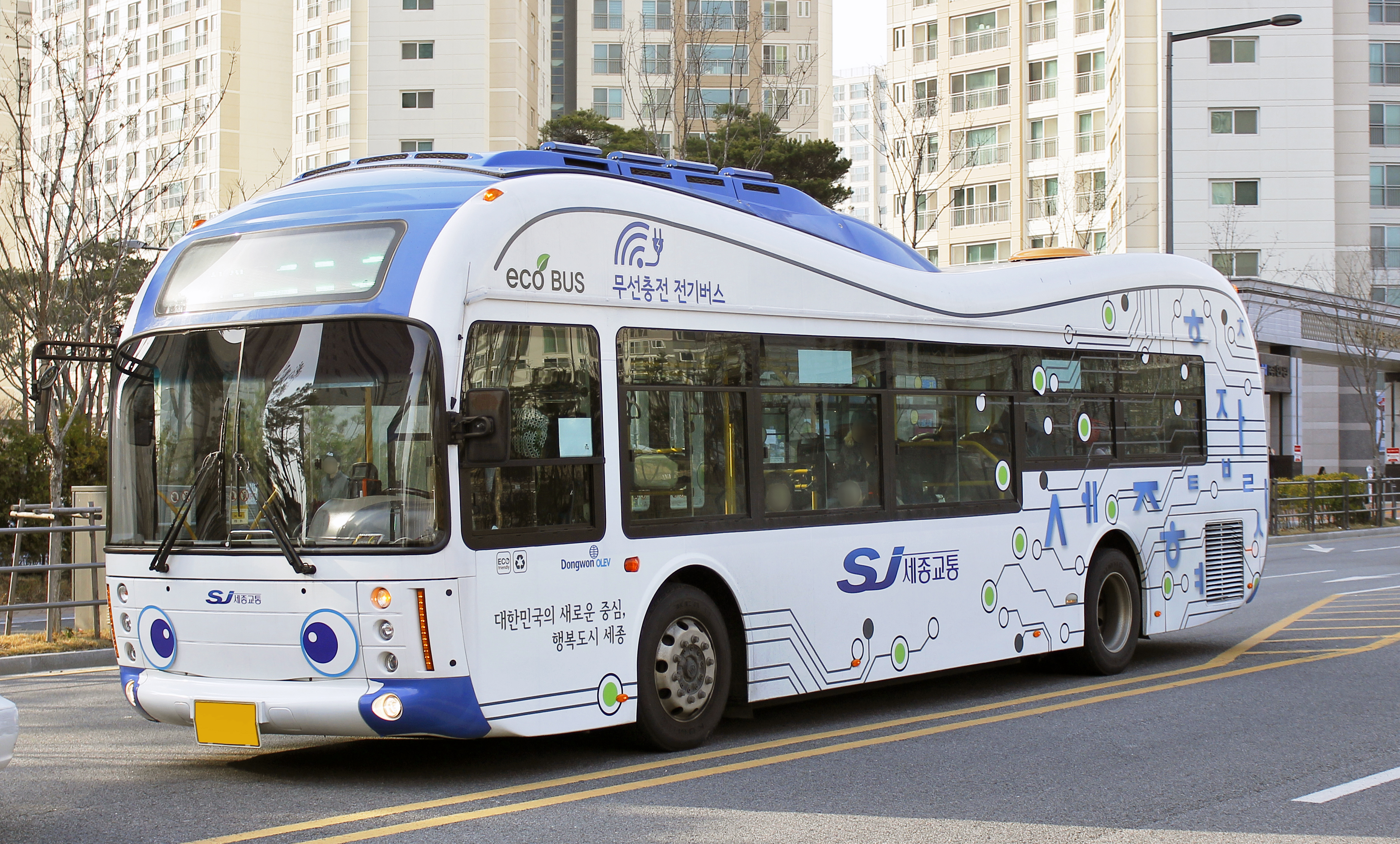
OLEV bus in service

On-Line Electric Vehicle or OLEV is an electric vehicle system developed by KAIST, the Korea Advanced Institute of Science and Technology, which charges electric vehicles wirelessly while moving using inductive charging. Segments composed of coils buried in the road transfer energy to a receiver or pickup that is mounted on the underside of the electric vehicle, which powers the vehicle and charges its battery.

KAIST launched a shuttle service using the technology in 2009. The first public bus line that uses OLEV was launched on March 9, 2010; another bus line was launched in Sejong in 2015; two more bus lines were added in Gumi in 2016; all four wireless charging bus lines were shut down due to aging infrastructure. A new bus line was inaugurated in 2019 in Yuseong District. Commercialization of the technology has not been successful, leading to controversy over the continued public funding of the technology in 2019.

The technology was selected as one of Time's 50 best inventions of 2010. KAIST and Electreon have been working on a standard for dynamic wireless charging in 2021 and 2022.

== Technology ==
The On-Line Electric Vehicle system is split into two main parts: buried segments of inductive power transmitters in the road, and inductive receiver modules on the underside of the vehicle. The use of charging while driving eliminates the need for charging stations, but its installation is costly, and current implementations are limited to 60 mph.

The power transmitters in the road may be buried 30 cm underground and composed of ferrite cores (magnetic cores used in induction) with coils wrapped around them, arranged on both sides of a central column. The primary coils are placed in segments across certain spans of the road so that only about 5% to 15% of the road needs to be dug up and resurfaced for installation. To power the primary coils, cables are attached to the power grid through a power inverter. The inverter accepts 60 Hz 3-phase 380 or 440 voltage from the grid to generate 20 kHz of AC electricity into the cables. The cables create a 20 kHz magnetic field that sends flux through the slim ferrite cores to the pick-ups on the OLEV.

Attached beneath the vehicle are receivers or pick-up modules, known as secondary inductive coils. The flux from the transmitters, or primary coils, transfers energy to the receivers, or secondary coils, and each pick-up gains about 17 kW of power from the induced current. A regulator distributes the power to the engine and the battery, charging the vehicle wirelessly while driving.

OLEV modules
Model	Weight	Primary coil core shape	Secondary coil core shape	Air gap	Power efficiency	Power per receiver (kW)	Power per receiver (hp)	Primary coil current	Additional mechanisms
Generation 1 (Small Cart)	10 kg	E shape	E shape	1 cm	80%	3 kW	4.02Hp	100 Amp	3mm vertical alignment mechanism
Generation 2 (Bus)	80 kg	U shape	Long, flat	17 cm	72%	6 kW	8.04Hp	200 Amp	Return cables for primary coils
Generation 3 (SUV)	110 kg	Slim W shape	Wide W shape	17 cm	71%	17 kW	22.79Hp	200 Amp	None

For the Generation 1 OLEV, if the primary and secondary coils are vertically misaligned by a distance over 3mm, the power efficiency drops greatly. In Generation 2 OLEV, the current in the primary coil was doubled to create a stronger magnetic field that allows for a larger air gap. The ferrite cores in the primary coils were changed to a U shape and the cores in the secondary coil were changed a flat board shape. This design allows the vertical misalignment to be about 20 cm with a 50% power efficiency. However, the U-shaped cores also require return cables, which bumps up the cost of production. The third-generation OLEV uses ultra-slim W-shaped ferrite cores in the primary coil to reduce the amount of ferrite used to 1/5 of gen 2 and to remove the need of return cables. The secondary coil uses a thicker variation of the W-shaped cores as a way to make up for the lesser area for the magnetic flux to flow through compared to gen 2.

== See also ==
- ABB TOSA Flash Mobility, Clean City, Smart Bus
- Autonomous Rail Rapid Transit
- Ground-level power supply
- Gyrobus
- Inductive charging of electric vehicles
- Wireless power transfer
