= Grand Maket Rossiya =

Museum in Saint Petersburg, Russia

Coordinates: 59.8879863°N 30.3303463°E

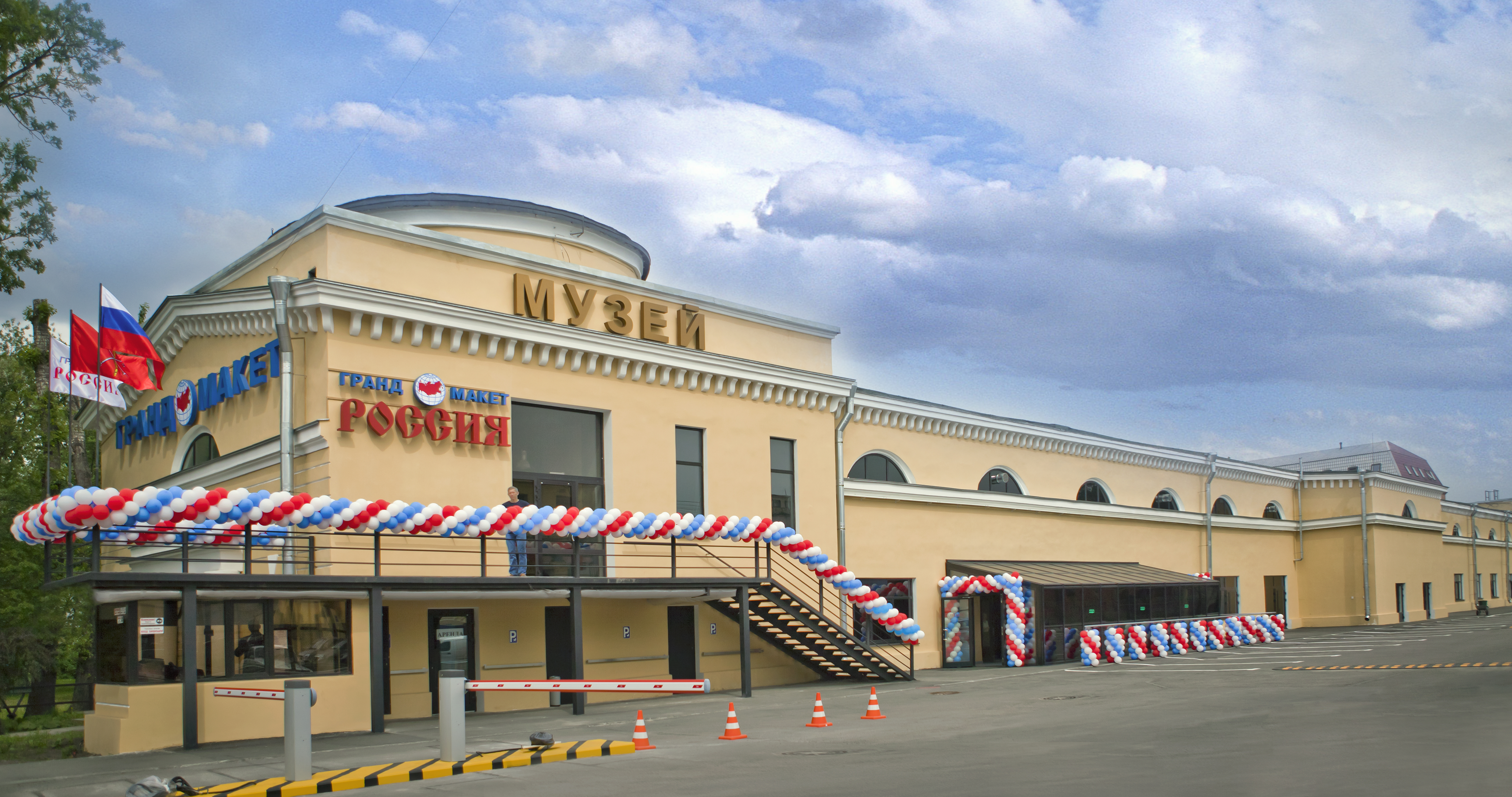
- Established: November 21, 2008; 17 years ago
- Location: Tsvetochnaja str. 16, Saint Petersburg, Russia
- Public transit access: Moskovskiye Vorota metro station
- Website: Official website

Grand Maket Rossiya (Russian: Гранд Макет Россия) is a private museum in Saint Petersburg, Russia. It is a model layout designed on a scale of 1:87 (HO scale) and covers an area of 800 m^{2} (8,600 sq ft). In this area, collective images of regions of the Russian Federation are represented. It is the largest model layout in Russia and the second largest in the world (after the Miniatur Wunderland in Hamburg, Germany). The model is located in a two-story building built in 1953, in the style of Stalin’s empire. The creator of the project is a Saint Petersburg businessman Sergey Morozov.

== Layout ==
The model took five years to build and employed over one hundred people. First, a wooden frame to be used under the model was made. Then the foundations for the roads and railroads were made. Later, the model wooden ribs were installed and a layer of plaster (11 tons were used) was ca

== Museum opening ==
The first visitors were allowed in the museum in April 2011. For the next 14 months, the museum worked in test mode, only taking visitors at the weekend. The official opening took place on 8 June 2012.

== View ==
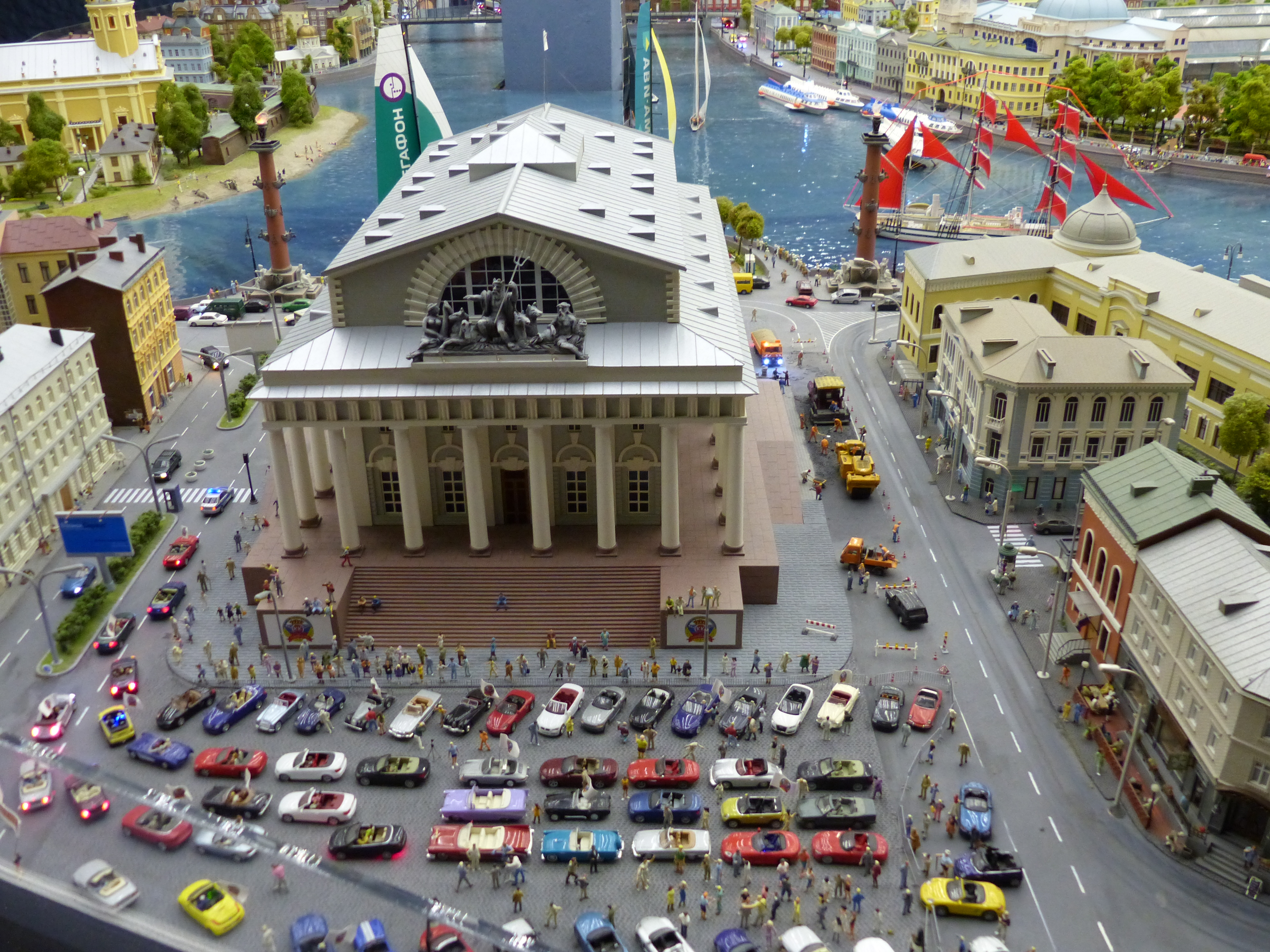
"The mock-up represents the artistic embodiment of the image of Russia"

The model presents an image of everyday life in Russia, realized through models. These everyday situations represent different human activities, such as work, leisure, sports, studying, military service, country life, travel, mass celebrations and even an attempt to escape from prison. Ground transportation is represented by various kinds of cars and trucks, trams, buses, trains, and agricultural, construction and military equipment. Visitors have an opportunity to set things in motion on the model by pushing interactive buttons placed around the layout.

== Technical solutions ==
=== The day/night system ===
Every 13 minutes the lighting of the model is changed as day turns gradually into night. The night lighting lasts for 2 minutes. More than 800 000 LED lights in different colours were used to illuminate the model without creating shadows

=== Movement of road vehicles ===
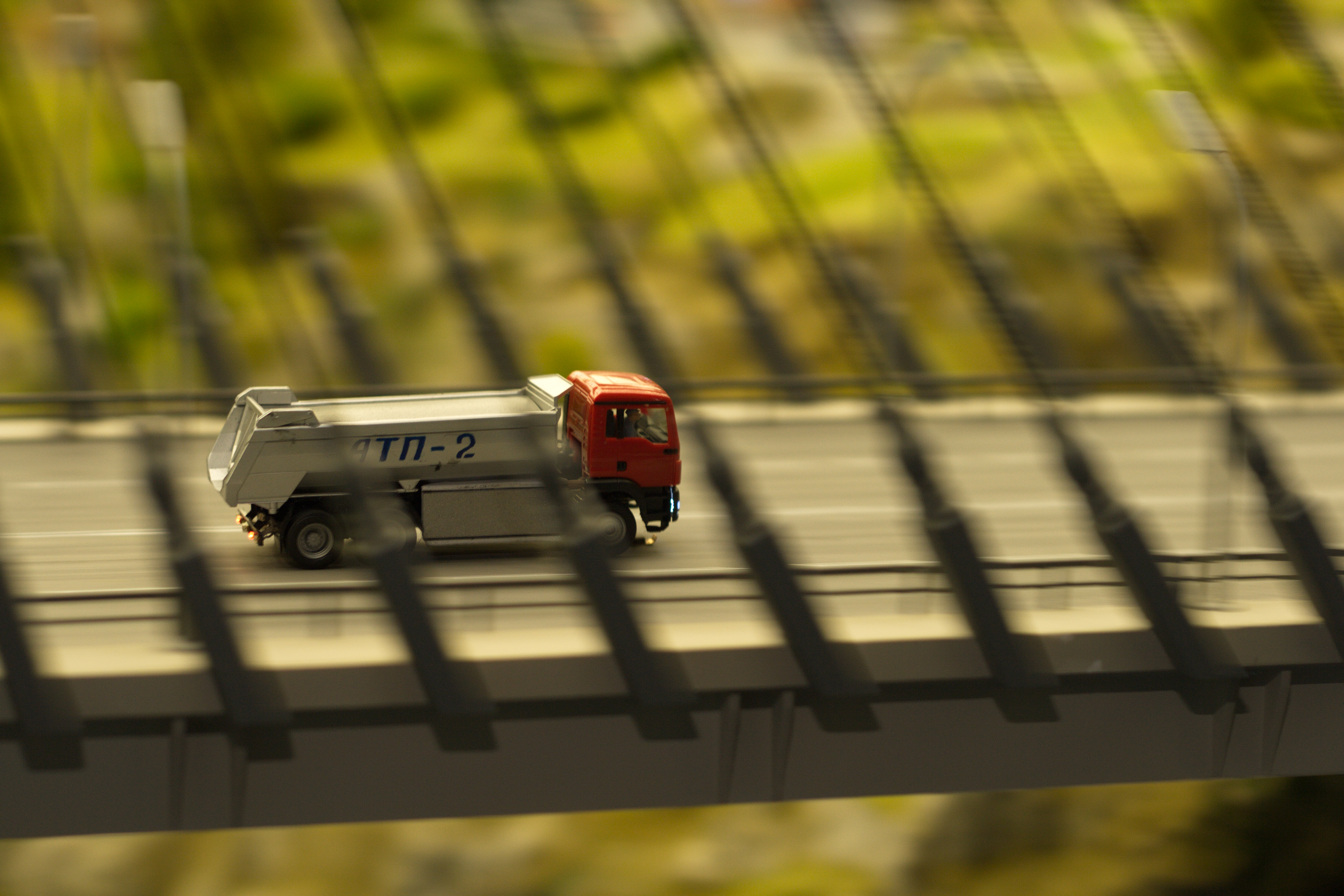
Wirelessly powered model car at Grand Maket Rossiya

The movement of the cars in the model is realistic. The cars and buses stop at traffic lights, bus stops and flashing signals, and they change speeds and bypass each other. The electrical energy for the automobiles is obtained remotely from underneath the model, so the cars themselves don't appear to have a power supply. This was the first use of this method for moving cars in this way.

=== Railway traffic ===
To optimize the traffic on the layout, it was built in many levels using more than 2,500 m (8,200 ft) of rails and 452 switch boxes. The total number of rolling stock is more than 2700, of which 250 are locomotives and 10 are special cleaning trains. The variety of the moving trains is created using two revolver exchangers that store up to 60 trains and dispatch them when needed. On the layout there are also two turntables which can turn the locomotives up to 180 degrees. The largest height difference in the model is 1 m (3 ft 3 in). This is achieved with over 50 m (160 ft) of spiral lifts.

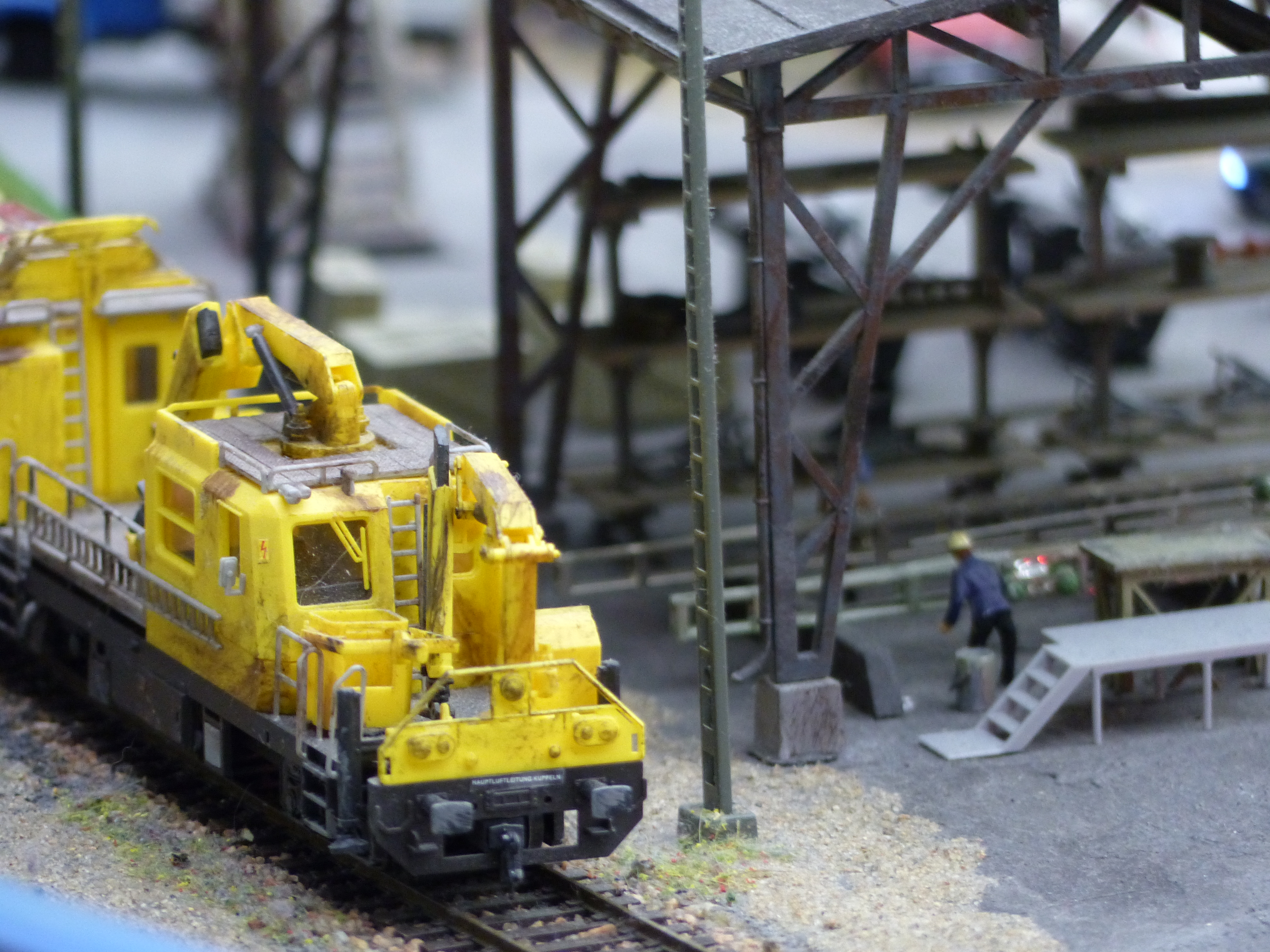
"The total number of rolling stock units is more than 2,700, of which 250 are locomotives"

== Awards ==
- In 2013, Sergey Morozov won the 'sobaka.ru' top 50-most famous people in Saint Petersburg award in the science field.
- In 2014, Grand Maket Russia entered the list of top 10 museums in Russia, listed by the users of tourist site TripAdvisor.
- In that same year, Sergey Morozov won the business award of 'Boss of the Year' for his nomination in 'Breakthrough Boss of the Year'.
- In that same year again, Grand Maket Russia entered the top 10-most photographed places in Saint Petersburg.
