= Lightelligence =

Chinese photon chip company

Shanghai Xizhi Technology Co., Ltd.
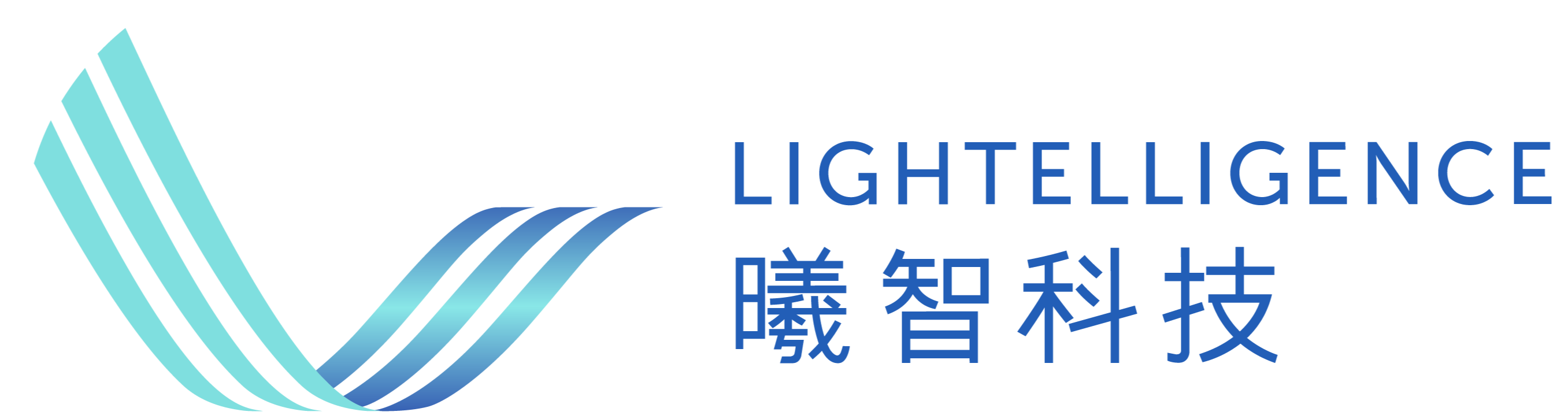
- Trade name: Lightelligence
- Native name: 上海曦智科技股份有限公司
- Company type: Public
- Traded as: SEHK: 1879
- Industry: Semiconductor
- Founded: 2017; 9 years ago
- Founders: Shen Yichen; Huaiyu Meng; Spencer Powers; Marin Soljačić
- Headquarters: Shanghai, China; Boston, Massachusetts, U.S.
- Key people: Shen Yichen (Chairman & CEO)
- Revenue: ▲CN¥106.37 million (2025)
- Net income: ▼CN¥−1.34 billion (2025)
- Total assets: ▼CN¥1.14 billion (2025)
- Total equity: ▼CN¥−4.25 billion (2025)
- Number of employees: 257 (2025)
- Website: www.lightelligence.ai

Shanghai Xizhi Technology Co., Ltd. known commonly as Lightelligence is a technology company that focuses on photonic integrated circuits.

== Background ==
Lightelligence was founded in 2017 in Boston by MIT PhD Shen Yichen along with Marin Soljačić and two other MIT alumni. It was based on a 2017 Nature Photonics paper named "Deep learning with coherent nanophotonic circuits" where Shen was the lead author. The company was spun out of MIT shortly thereafter to commercialize the technology.

Investors of the company include Tencent and Sequoia Capital.

In April 2026, it was reported that Lightelligence was seeking an initial public offering (IPO) on the Hong Kong Stock Exchange. On 28 April, Lightelligence held its IPO to become a listed company.

== Product history ==
In 2019, Lightelligence produced its first optical AI accelerator demo called COMET, which was able to accurately recognize handwritten digits.

In 2021, Lightelligence released PACE (Photonic Arithmetic Computing Engine), an integrated photonic–electronic platform.

In June 2023, Lightelligence released Hummingbird, an optical network on chip processor for domain specific artificial intelligence (AI) workloads. In August, Lightelligence released Photowave, the first optical communications hardware designed for PCI Express and Compute Express Link connectivity.

In February 2026, Lightelligence introduced PACE2.
