= Inductive charging =

Type of wireless power transfer

The primary coil in the charger induces a current in the secondary coil in the device being charged.

Inductive charging, also known as wireless charging or cordless charging, is a type of wireless power transfer. It uses electromagnetic induction to provide electricity to portable devices. Inductive charging is also used in vehicles, power tools, electric toothbrushes, and medical devices. The equipment can be placed over an inductive pad free of any electrical contacts such as a dock or plug.

Inductive charging transfers energy through inductive coupling: alternating current passes through an induction coil, generating a fluctuating magnetic field, which creates an induced alternating electric current in a nearby secondary coil. The alternating current can be rectified to a direct current which charges a battery or provides operating power.

Greater distances between sender and receiver coils, such as those required for wirelessly charging electric vehicles, can be achieved with resonant inductive coupling. The alternating current of the system can use a resonance frequency tuned with capacitors to create a transmitter and receiver LC circuit with a specific resonance frequency. The frequency is chosen depending on the distance desired for optimal efficiency, and as of 2025 the frequency is commonly 85 kHz. Some systems use inductive loops made of Litz wire surrounding ferrite cores. Charging efficiency is sensitive to lateral, longitudinal, and vertical misalignment. Misalignment of more than 3 cm (1.2 in) can severely lower power transfer. Some systems align their coils by having the receiver coils mounted on a movable arm that can be lowered closer to the transmitter coils, for example it can be lowered from the underside of a truck closer to a transmitter coil on the ground.

== Applications ==
Applications of inductive charging can be divided broadly into low power and high power. Low power applications generally target consumer electronic devices such as cell phones, handheld devices, computers, and similar devices which normally require power below 100 watts. The AC utility frequency of 50 or 60 hertz is often used, or in the case of Qi-compliant devices, frequencies in the range of 87 to 205 kHz are typical. Some methods, such as resonant inductive coupling, can maintain charging at a distance of a few inches between the transmitter and receiver coil, though foreign objects pose a fire or burn risk if metals or organisms are between the active coils for high-power systems. High power inductive charging generally refers to power above 1 kilowatt. Such power is required for electric vehicles, and some implementations reach 300 kilowatts or higher. High-power inductive charging systems use resonant inductive coupling for higher efficiency. These systems are usually implemented in the long wave range of frequencies in the tens of kilohertz, commonly 85 kHz as the regulatory allowable noise levels are higher at this range than surrounding ranges. Short wave frequencies can enhance the system's efficiency and size but they're not used because they would create radio interference worldwide. High power at 85 kHz raise the concern of electromagnetic compatibility and radio frequency interference over background noise levels at ranges of up to 300 km (190 mi).

Inductive charging offers protected connections free of need of corrosion protection. Induction circuits offer protection from faults such as short circuits due to insulation failure, especially where connections are made or broken frequently. Without the need to constantly plug and unplug the device, there is significantly less wear and tear on the socket of the device and the attaching cable. For embedded medical devices, the transmission of power via a magnetic field passing through the skin avoids the infection risks associated with wires penetrating the skin. Automatic operation of inductive charging in roads can allows vehicles to operate without charging stops through opportunity charging over inductive coils embedded in the road.

== Power losses and waste heat ==
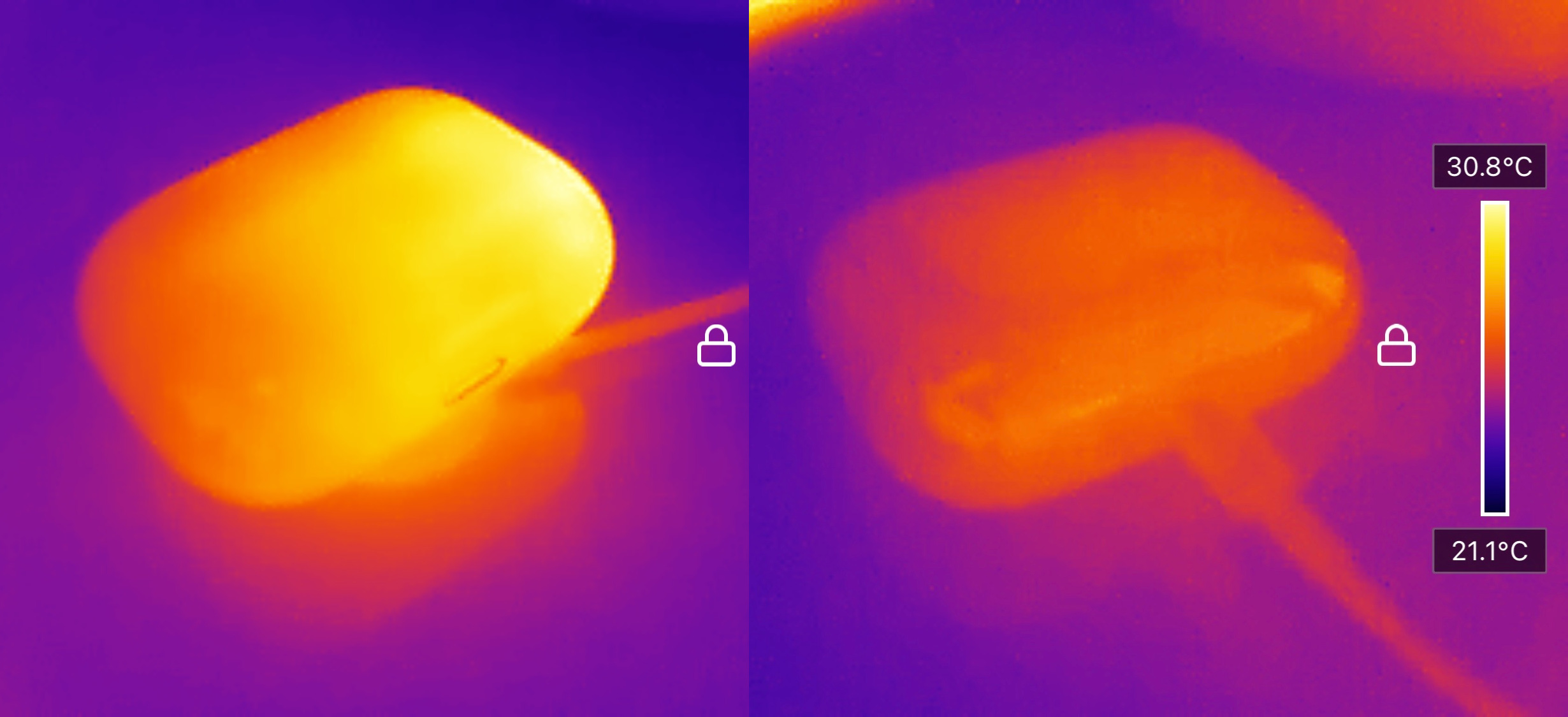
Charging with induction (left image) creates more waste heat than using a cable (right image).

Due to the lower efficiency of inductive charging compared to conductive charging, devices took 15 percent longer to charge when supplied power is the same amount when tested in 2018. An amateur 2020 analysis of energy use conducted with a Pixel 4 found that a wired charge from 0 to 100 percent consumed 14.26 Wh (watt-hours), while a wireless charging stand used 19.8 Wh, an increase of 39%. Using a generic wireless charging pad and mis-aligning the phone produced consumption up to 25.62 Wh, or an 80% increase. The analysis noted that while this is not likely to be noticeable to individuals, it has negative implications for greater adoption of smartphone wireless charging.

Inductive chargers produce more waste heat than wired chargers, which may negatively impact battery longevity. Waste heat is a concern for high-power implementations of inductive charging for transportation. Trials in France in 2023 found risk of thermal damage to the road under regular operating conditions due to the induction coils exceeding temperatures of 100 °C (212 °F).

== Standards ==
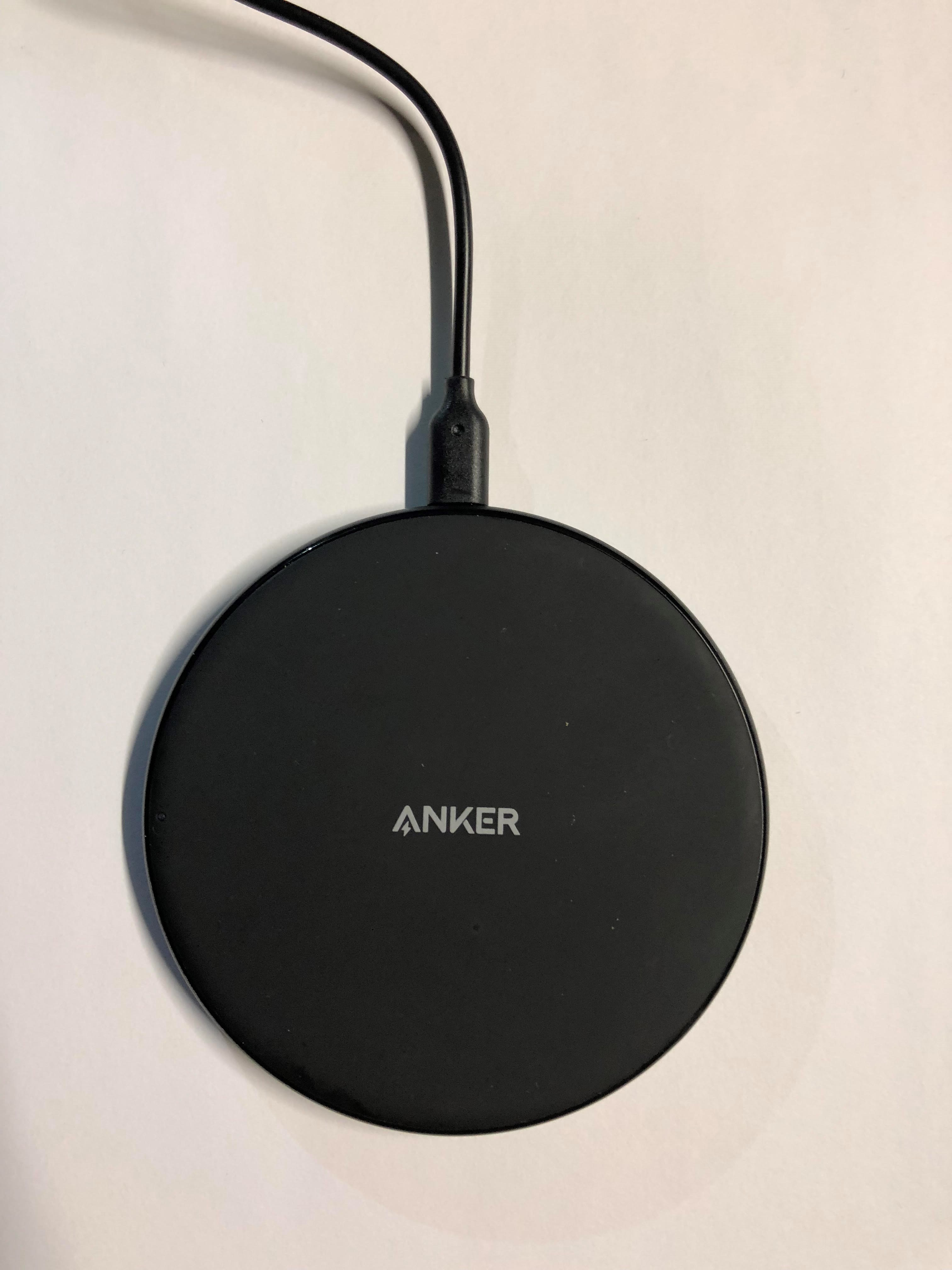
Wireless charging pad used to charge devices with the Qi standard

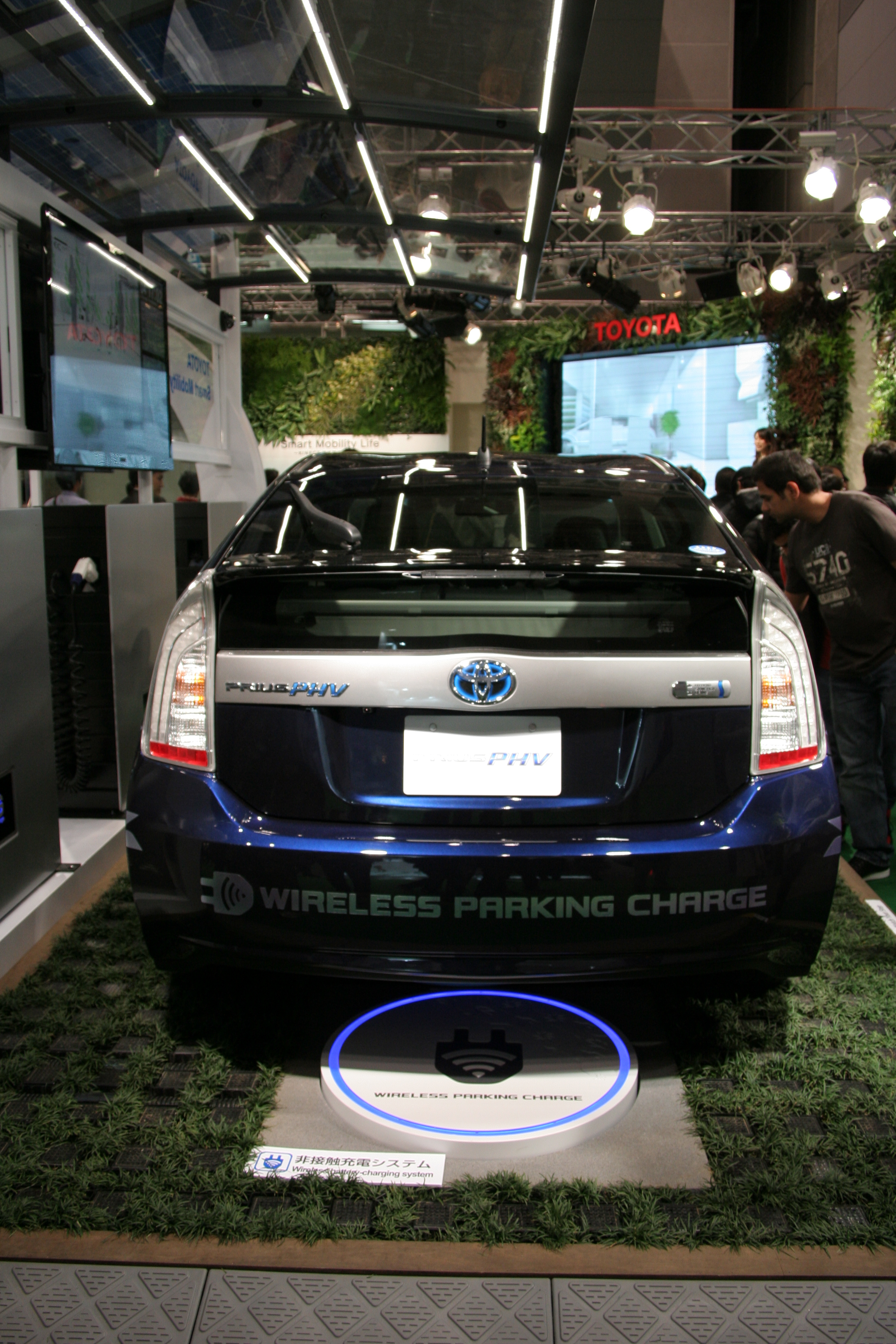
Electric vehicle wireless charging station

=== Electronics ===
The most commercially-successful standard for compatibility between inductive chargers and small electronic devices is the Qi standard, which started development in 2008 and was first published in 2010. Qi quickly expanded in the mid 2010s, and after a period of having three competing standards Qi became ubiquitous by the mid 2020s. Other standards include: Power Matters Alliance (PMA), which was publicly announced in January 2012; and Rezence, which was developed by the Alliance for Wireless Power (A4WP) and merged with PMA in 2015 under the AirFuel name.

=== Electric vehicles ===
A group was launched in May 2010 by the Consumer Electronics Association to set a baseline for interoperability for chargers. General Motors, Toyota, and Ford expressed interest in the technology and the standards effort. Daimler's Head of Future Mobility, Professor Herbert Kohler, expressed caution and said in 2011 that the inductive charging for EVs was at least 15 years away, and the safety aspects of inductive charging for EVs have yet to be looked into in greater detail. Magne Charge, also known as J1773, is an electric vehicle inductive charging system formerly available from General Motors.

The first standard for vehicle wireless charging was the SAE J2954 standard, published in 2020. It allows inductive car charging over a pad, with power delivery up to 11 kW. The standard provides a methodology for activating the charger only when sufficient alignment is detected. Development began in the early 2020s for standards for higher-power wireless charging and charging while driving. Coordination was initiated in 2026 for the development of a standard for vehicle-to-grid wireless charging by SAE Group Europe, Denso Germany, Toyota Motor Europe, ABB, Fraunhofer, University of Leeds, and others.

==== Charging-while-driving standards ====
Development of technologies and standards for charging-while-driving, or dynamic wireless power transfer (DWPT), continued in the 2020s by several organizations. Among them: Utah State University, Purdue University, the University of Auckland, Vedecom, ENRX (formerly IPT), and Magment.

SAE International has started developing standards for dynamic wireless power transfer in 2023. An Electreon representative stated in a podcast published in December 2023 that SAE, Electreon, and other organizations are jointly developing a standard for dynamic wireless inductive charging.

Electreon has also collaborated in the early 2020s on standardization with the Michigan Department of Transportation (MDOT) and WiPowerOne, an offshoot of the KAIST OLEV project. The collaboration produced a study on the commercialization viability of dynamic wireless inductive charging.

IPT (which later became a subsidiary of ENRX) has been working on its PRIMOVE system that uses inductive cables instead of coils; they regard existing standards which use coils as "extremely expensive" for dynamic charging.

== Electronic devices ==
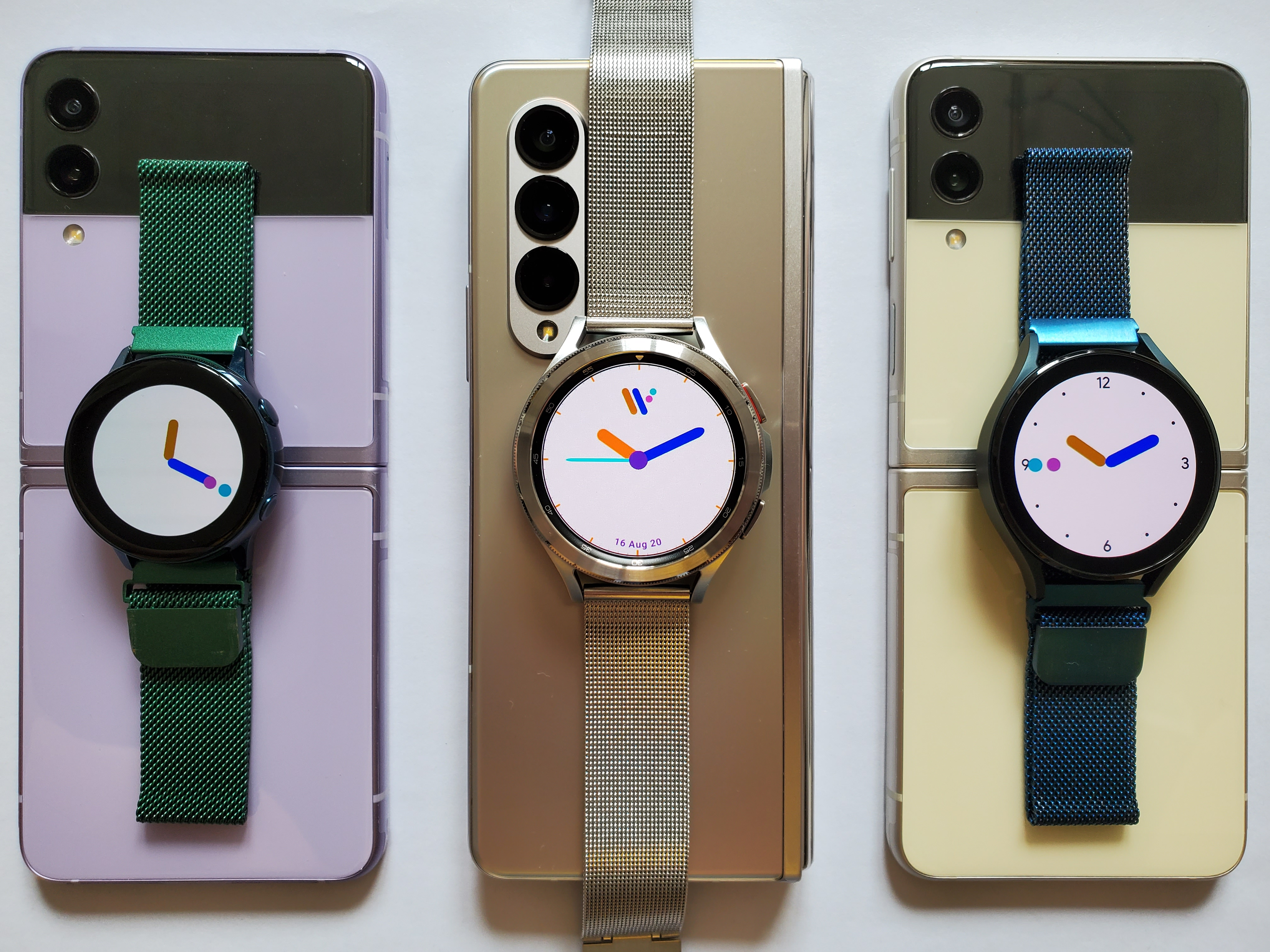
Samsung Galaxy Z smartphones inductively charging smart watches

Manufacturers of smartphones have started adding inductive charging technology into their devices in the late 2010s, the majority adopting the Qi wireless charging standard. Some battery-powered devices offer wireless bidirectional charging, allowing a charged device to charge the battery of another device.

=== Early modern proprietary implementations ===
- Electric toothbrushes which use inductive charging have been commercially available since as early as the 1970s.
- Visteon introduced in 2007 a device inductive charging system to allow vehicles to charge specially made cell phones and MP3 players with compatible receivers.
- Energizer introduced in 2009 an inductive charging station for the Wii remote.
- The 2009 Palm Pre smartphone had an optional inductive charger accessory, the "Touchstone". Further Palm and HP devices used Touchstone charging technology.
- An MIT inductive power project started in 2006, WiTricity, uses a curved coil and capacitive plates.

== Transportation ==
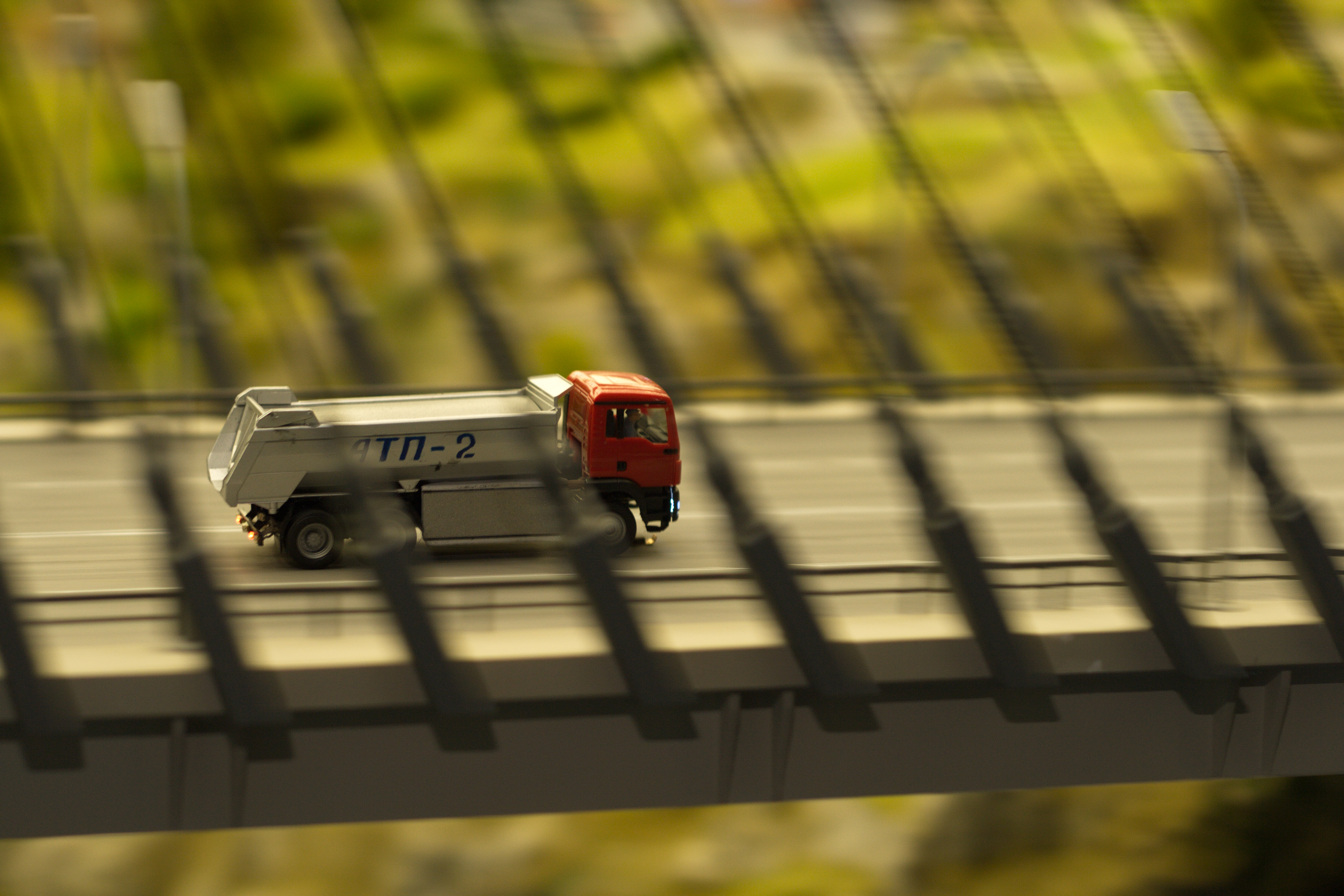
A wirelessly powered model lorry at the Grand Maket Rossiya museum

Electric vehicle wireless power transfer or wireless charging is generally divided into three categories: stationary charging when the vehicle is parked for an extended period of time; dynamic charging when the vehicle is driven on roads or highways; and quasi-dynamic or semi-dynamic charging, when the vehicle moves at low speeds between stops, for example when a taxi idles and slowly drives along a taxi rank.

Inductive charging is not considered a mature dynamic charging technology as it delivers the least power of the three electric road technologies, its receivers lose 20%-25% of the supplied power when installed on trucks, and its health effects have yet to be documented, according to a French government working group on electric roads. Similarly, research in Germany by BASt in 2025 estimated 76%–81% overall efficiency for heavy goods transport. Trials in Norway in 2025 found that coil misalignment of more than 3 cm (1.2 in) can severely lower power transfer. SAE International notes that wireless charging systems do not have well-established foreign object detection technologies, and proposes establishing safety tests for these technologies. Foreign objects pose a fire or burn risk if metals or organisms are between the ground pad and the receiver when the system is active.

=== Early developments ===
M. Hutin and M. Le-Blanc proposed in 1894 an apparatus and method to power an electric vehicle with inductive power transfer. At the time, combustion engines proved more popular, and this technology was not widely implemented. In 1972, Professor Don Otto of the University of Auckland proposed a vehicle powered by induction using transmitters in the road and a receiver on the vehicle. Bolger, Kirsten, and Ng implemented in 1978 an electric vehicle powered by inductive power transfer at a frequency of 180 Hz and power of 20 kW. An inductive-charging bus was operated in the 1980s in California, and similar developments in inductive power transfer were being explored in France, Germany, and other European countries.

=== Early modern examples ===
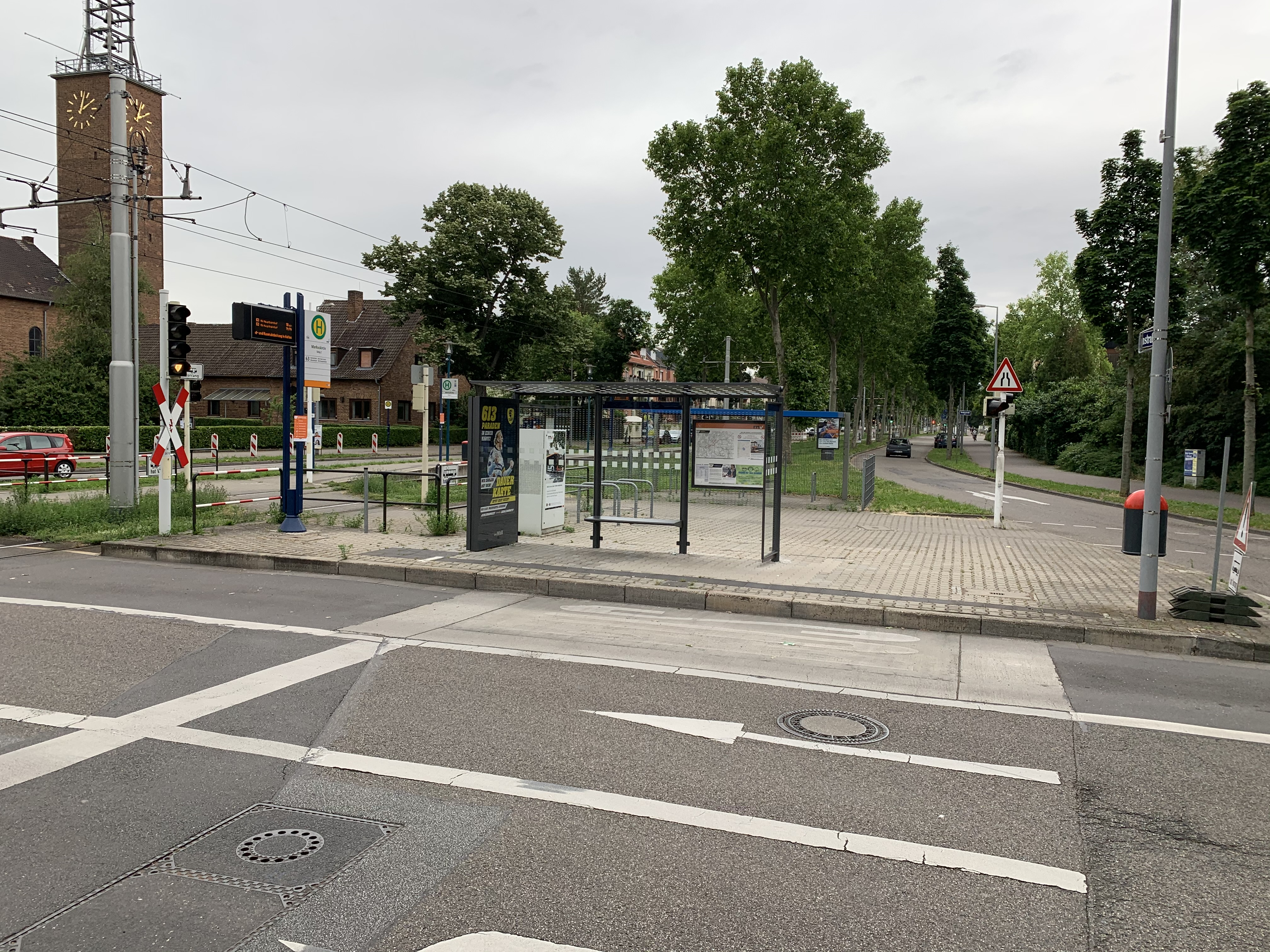
200kW Charging-Pad for Buses, 2020 Bombardier Transportation

- In 1997 Conductix-Wampfler started testing wireless charging in Germany. In 2002 the technology was implemented in 20 buses in operation in Turin, Italy. In 2008 the technology was implemented in a Mercedes-Benz A-Class E-CELL. With the participation of the local municipality and several businesses, field trials were begun in March 2010. The first system was sold to Google in 2011 for employee use at the Mountain View campus.
- Magne Charge inductive charging was employed by several types of electric vehicles around 1998, but was discontinued after the California Air Resources Board selected the SAE J1772-2001, or "Avcon", conductive charging interface for electric vehicles in California in June 2001. General Motors and Toyota agreed on this interface and it was also used in the Chevrolet S-10 EV and Toyota RAV4 EV vehicles.
- EPCOT Universe of Energy is equipped with moving theater "pews," which take passengers/viewers through the exhibit. They are self-propelled, and inductively recharged when at rest. This exhibit with the recharging technology was in place ca. 2003.
- In November 2011, the Mayor of London, Boris Johnson, and Qualcomm announced a trial of 13 wireless charging points and 50 EVs in the Shoreditch area of London's Tech City, due to be rolled out in early 2012. In October 2014, the University of Utah in Salt Lake City, Utah added an electric bus to its mass transit fleet that uses an induction plate at the end of its route to recharge. UTA, the regional public transportation agency, planned to introduce similar buses in 2018. In November 2012 wireless charging was introduced with 3 buses in Utrecht, The Netherlands. January 2015, eight electric buses were introduced to Milton Keynes, England, which uses inductive charging in the road with IPT technology at either end of the journey to prolong overnight charges.
- Bombardier-Transportation presented in September 2015 its PRIMOVE 3.6 kW Charger for cars, which was developed at Site in Mannheim, Germany. Primove was bought in 2021 by IPT, which by 2023 became a subsidiary of ENRX.
- Transport for London trialed inductive charging for double-decker buses in London in 2014.
- Evatran began selling the Plugless L2 Wireless charging system to the public in 2014.
- Wärtsilä operated a full-scale pilot installation in 2017 employing 1.6MW of power over 50 cm (20 in) distance between landside and onboard coils for charging of an electric hybrid ferry in commercial operation. The pilot test was run for one year.
- A partnership between Cabonline, Jaguar, Momentum Dynamics, and Fortum Recharge is trialed wireless charging a taxi fleet in Oslo, Norway. The fleet consisted of 25 Jaguar I-Pace SUVs equipped with inductive charging pads rated at 50-75 kW. The pads use resonant inductive coupling operating at 85 Hz. Momentum Dynamics, which was renamed InductEV, has entered insolvency assignment in August 2025.

=== Dynamic charging ===
Wireless charging of an electric vehicle while driving is known as "dynamic wireless charging" or "dynamic wireless power transfer", DWPT. The first working full-scale DWPT prototype is generally regarded to have been developed at the University of California, Berkeley in the 1980s and 1990s. The first commercialized DWPT system, Online Electric Vehicle (OLEV), was developed as early as 2009 by researchers at the KAIST. Vehicles using the system draw power from a power source underneath the road surface, which is an array of inductive rails or coils. There have been efforts to standardize dynamic wireless power transfer in the 2020s.

The main technical challenge of DWPT is low efficiency. The German Ministry of Economy, BMWK tested in-road wireless EV charging infrastructure implemented by Electreon in 2023. The tests included a bus equipped with inductive coils that receive power from a 200-meter strip of transmitters under the road surface. The receivers were able to collect 64.3% of the energy emitted from the transmitters. Installation proved complex and costly, and finding suitable locations for the coils' roadside power cabinets proved difficult. Honda plans holding a trial for a 150 kW wireless electric road system on a public road in Japan in 2027. The system integrates the inverter into the coils in order to increase its electrical power efficiency. The system is capable of bearing vehicles weighing up to about 20 tonnes.

==== Commercialization ====
Commercialization efforts of the technology have not been successful because of high costs in the 2010s and 2020s. The cost of a single wireless electric lane at 50% coverage at large-scale deployment was estimated in 2021 to be about 6.5 million dollars per mile.

A Michigan study that was published in 2026 about wireless inductive electric road systems, using data from BRTdata.org for the year 2025, found that a wireless charging lane would not be cost-effective for most bus rapid transit (BRT) systems around the world, with the exception of the ones in Beijing, Xiamen, and Bogotá. Cost-effectiveness requires a combination of high fleet utilization and high traffic density: utilization is given by the ratio of traveling buses to the total available bus fleet, and density is given by the number of traveling buses per mile of bus lane. The study assumes a wireless power transfer efficiency of 90%, installation of the minimal length of wireless charging infrastructure required to meet fleet charging needs, and a fixed cost of $3M per wireless charging infrastructure mile and an additional cost of $10k per kW-mile. This gives, for example, a cost of $4M per mile for a 100 kW wireless charging system, where the 100 kW system is more expensive per mile than a 50 kW or 25 kW system, but requires less miles of charging lanes.

=== Effects on road surface ===
Inductive charging infrastructure was found in 2017 to increase the occurrence of reflective cracks in road surfaces.

INDOT began studying the road installation of a dynamic wireless power transfer (DWPT) system in 2024 with special polymer-concrete previously used for bridges.

Testing of various bonding materials between the inductive coils and the asphalt in 2023 at Nantes showed that standard installation techniques of inductive coils under the asphalt were not satisfactory and resulted in critical strains. Performance was satisfactory with the use of specific bonding resins, with non-critical degradation in performance compared to reference pavements with no inductive coils. Despite satisfactory results, even the best-performing methods showed risk of debonding of the casing of the coils from the top layer of the road. ÉTS and Université Laval studied the structural performance of in-pavement inductive coils in 2025, similarly finding evidence of debonding. The 2023 Nantes trials showed increased risk of thermal damage to the road under regular operating conditions due to the induction coils exceeding temperatures of 100 °C (212 °F). The wireless ERS trial in France along a kilometer on the A10 autoroute used asphalt reinforced with woven fiberglass to meet the road's mechanical requirements and limit premature occurrence of reflective cracks.

== Medical implications ==
Wireless charging is making an impact in the medical sector by means of being able to charge implants and sensors long-term that is located beneath the skin. Multiple companies offer rechargeable medical implant (e.g. implantable neurostimulators) which use inductive charging. Researchers have been able to print wireless power transmitting antenna on flexible materials that could be placed under the skin of patients. This could mean that under skin devices that could monitor the patient status could have a longer-term life and provide long observation or monitoring periods that could lead to better diagnosis from doctors. These devices may also make charging devices like pacemakers easier on the patient rather than having an exposed portion of the device pushing through the skin to allow corded charging. This technology would allow a completely implanted device making it safer for the patient. It is unclear if this technology will be approved for use – more research is needed on the safety of these devices. While these flexible polymers are safer than ridged sets of diodes they can be more susceptible to tearing during either placement or removal due to the fragile nature of the antenna that is printed on the plastic material. While these medical based applications seem very specific the high-speed power transfer that is achieved with these flexible antennas is being looked at for larger broader applications.

== See also ==
- Charging station
- Conductive wireless charging
- Ground-level power supply
- Litz wire
- Wardenclyffe Tower
- Wireless power transfer
- Wireless Power Consortium
