= Marin Soljačić =

Croatian physicist and electrical engineer

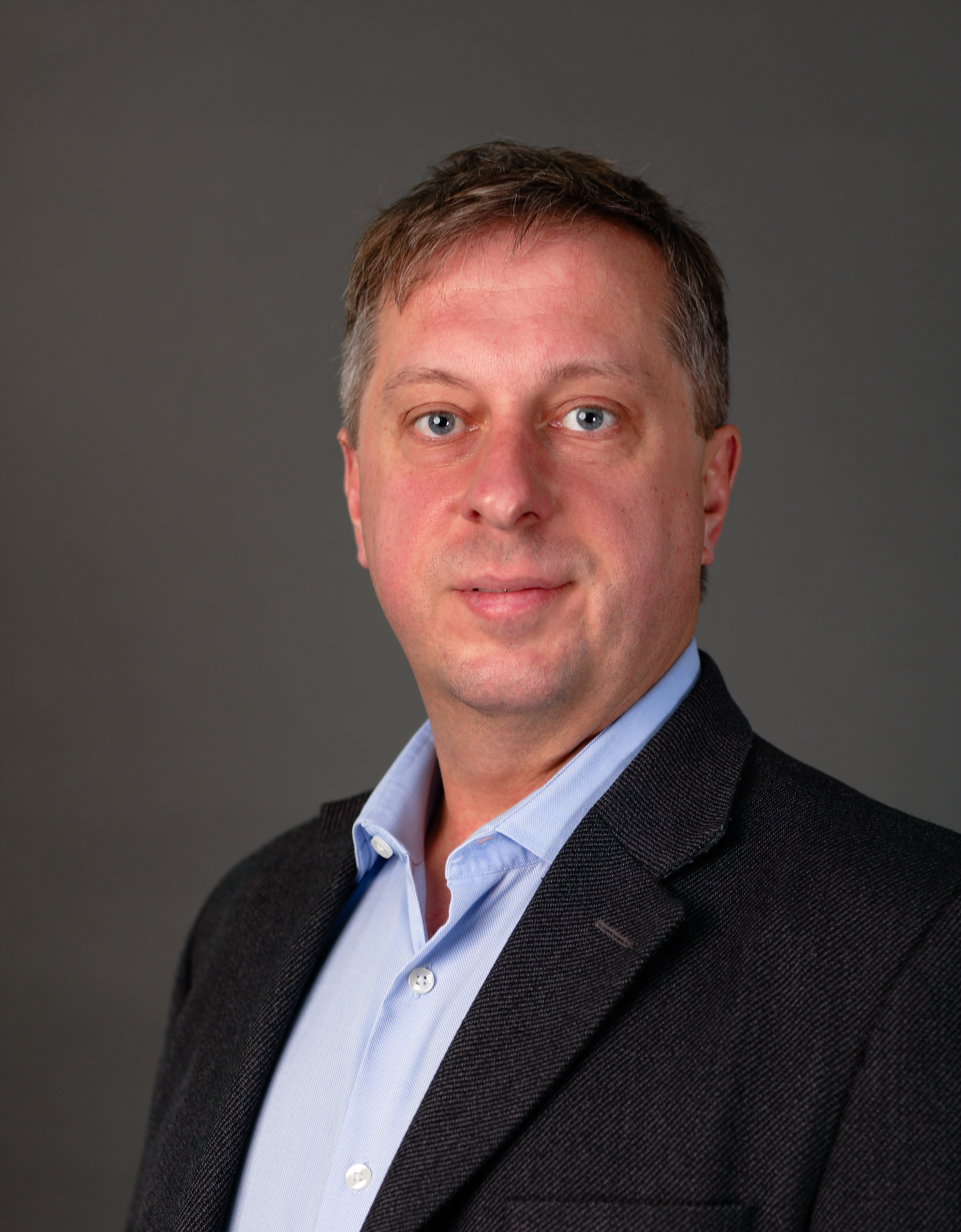
- Soljačić in 2023
- Born: February 7, 1974 (age 52); Zagreb, Yugoslavia (present-day Croatia)
- Education: Massachusetts Institute of Technology
- Known for: WiTricity, Nonlinear optics, Nanophotonics, AI
- Awards: Adolph Lomb Medal (2005); TR35 (2006); MacArthur Fellowship (2008); Blavatnik Award for Young Scientists (2014); Max Born Award (2023)
- Scientific career
- Fields: Physicist and Electrical Engineer
- Workplaces: Massachusetts Institute of Technology
- Doctoral advisor: Mordechai Segev
- Notable students: Prineha Narang

Marin Soljačić (born February 7, 1974) is a Croatian-American physicist and electrical engineer and Cecil and Ida Green Professor at physics department, MIT. He is credited as a co-founder of Lightelligence.

== Biography ==
Marin Soljačić was born in Zagreb in 1974. After graduating from XV Gymnasium (MIOC) in Zagreb he attended MIT, where he got his BSc in physics and electrical engineering in 1996. In 1998 he got his MSc from Princeton University and in 2000 he got his PhD in Physics. In 2005 he became a professor of Physics at MIT. In 2008, he was awarded a MacArthur "genius" Fellowship. In 2014, he was awarded Blavatnik National Award, and in 2023 Max Born award of Optica.

== Work ==
In 2007 Marin Soljačić and his assistants successfully made the first efficient non-radiative power transfer at a distance of 2 meters turning on a 60 W light bulb. Energy transfer was 40% efficient. Professor Soljačić's experiments and work in wireless energy transfer are related in spirit to the work of Nikola Tesla in the early 20th century, but also have significant differences: unlike Tesla's long-range wireless energy transfer in Colorado, the Soljačić group focuses only on short-range transfer, and unlike Tesla coils which resonantly transfer power with electric fields (which couple strongly to surrounding matter, most famously inducing artificial lightning) the Soljačić proposal uses coupling primarily via magnetic fields. This work is currently being pursued in Soljačić's WiTricity company.

In addition to wireless energy transfer, Prof. Soljačić works on numerous problems on electromagnetism in materials structured on the scale of the wavelength, such as micro- and nano-structured materials for infrared and visible light, including nonlinear optical devices and surface plasmons.
