= WiPower =

The Alliance for Wireless Power
- Type: Private
- Industry: Technology
- Headquarters: Altamonte Springs, Florida, United States
- Key people: Dr. Rahul Razdan, Ph.D. (CEO); Ryan Tseng (Founder); Ashish Gupta
- Website: a4wp.org

The Alliance For Wireless Power is an industry standard group that uses the principles of magnetic resonance to develop a wireless energy transfer system over distance. The WiPower system uses directed and controlled magnetic fields to replace traditional power cords. To do this, the transmitter utilizes one or more primary windings in order to induce an even magnetic field above its surface. A receiver in the magnetic field uses a secondary winding which captures the magnetic energy and converts it back to electrical energy.

WiPower's system was based on modified coreless inductive technology and dynamically adjusts power supplied by the transmitter to power demanded by the receiver without the need for control systems or communication. As such, the company's technology represents a simpler design versus alternate wireless power solutions. The system is capable of supplying power to multiple receivers simultaneously that are placed on top of the transmitter in any position or orientation, and the company has reported DC to DC efficiencies between 60 and 90%.

These technologies were combined in a backwards compatible manner with Intel and Qualcomm's wireless power over distance technologies to be standardised by the Alliance For Wireless Power.

== History ==
Originally pioneered by Nikola Tesla in the 1890s, wireless power transfer systems, largely based on Michael Faraday's electromagnetic induction principles of 1831, have seen many applications, from electronic toothbrushes to HP's smartphones based on webOS.

Founded in 2004, WiPower emerged from the University of Florida when founder Ryan Tseng began exploring the technology and developed a prototype. Over the following three years, the company continued research and development with the University of Florida, ultimately creating the current technology.

WiPower received coverage in the media, such as Fast Company magazine and the New York Times, and was featured on television shows, such as NBC's Today Show and CNBC's Power Lunch

== Acquisition and standards body formed ==
WiPower was acquired by Qualcomm in September 2010. The Alliance For Wireless Power was formed with major components suppliers in 2012, with Intel joining in 2013.

In 2015 the organization was merged with the Power Matters Alliance (PMA) to form the AirFuel Alliance.

== See also ==
- Qi (standard)
- Open Dots open standard for wire-free power by the Open Dots Alliance
