= Conductive charging =

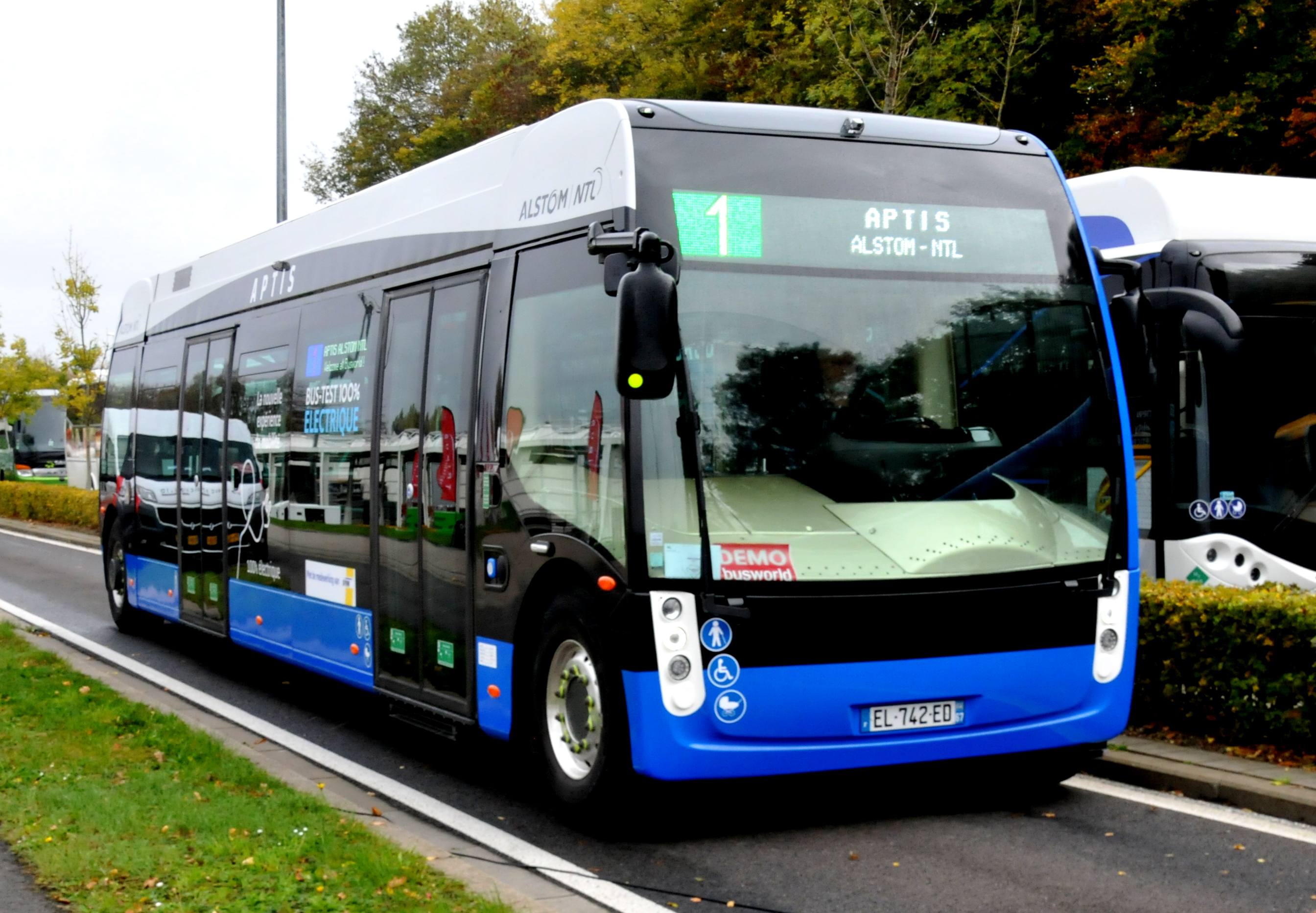
Electric bus equipped with an Alstom SRS receiver which charges the bus battery when it drives or parks over a conductive segment

Conductive charging is conductive power transfer that replaces the conductive wires between the charger and the charged device with conductive contacts. Charging infrastructure in the form of a board or rail delivers the power to a charging device equipped with an appropriate receiver, or pickup. When the infrastructure recognizes a valid receiver it powers on, and power is transferred.

== Phones and other electronic devices ==
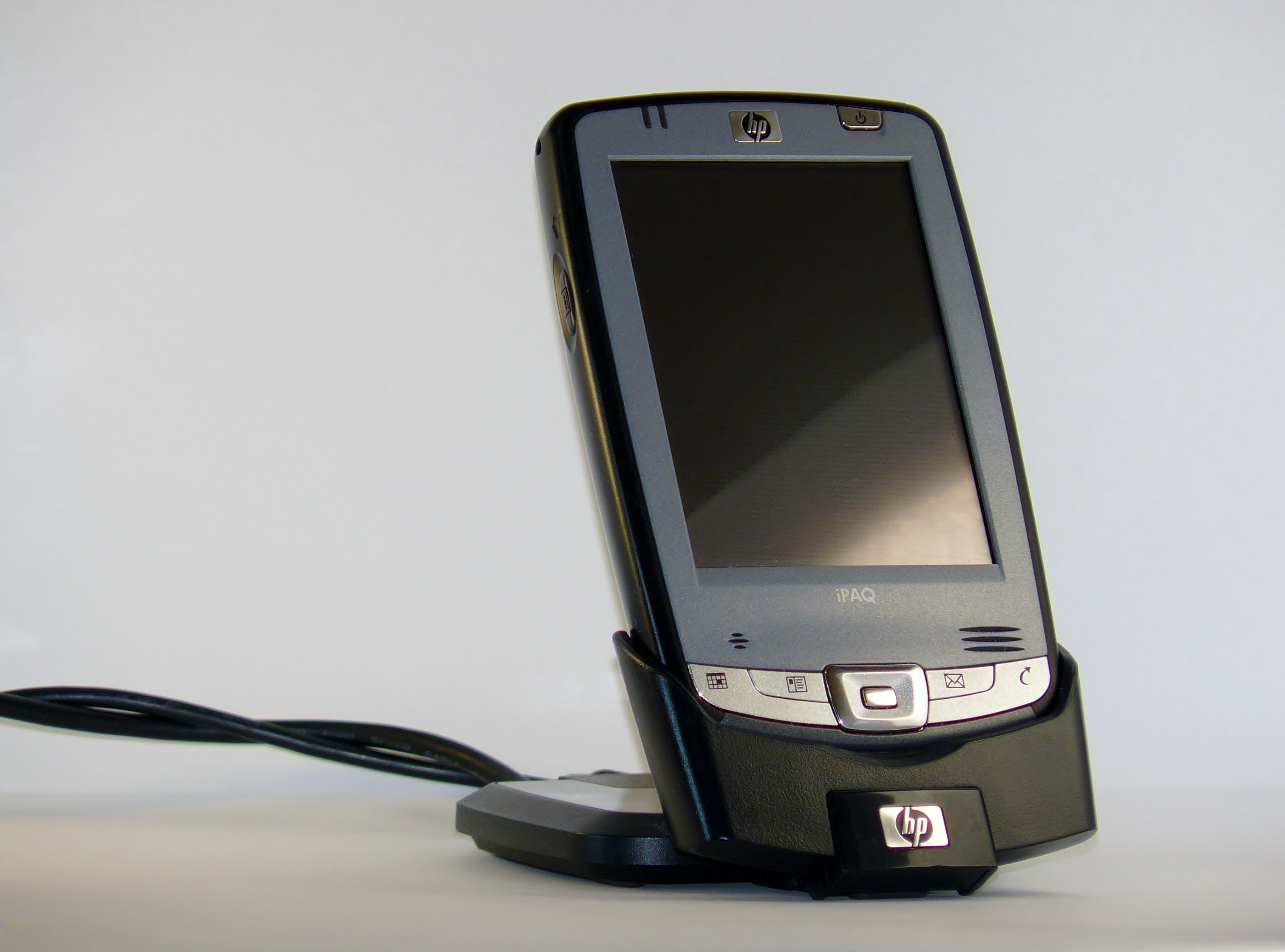
A charging cradle with contacts that connect to the device being charged

Conductive power transfer uses electrical contacts to connect a power supply to a portable device in order to transfer energy. The technology is sometimes called "conductive wireless charging". The need for a conductor-to-conductor connection between the power supply and the device is the main difference from inductive charging and other forms of wireless charging. The conductive power supply, often a charging base or pad, detects when a compatible receiver or pickup is placed on it. Contact-based accessories may include changeable backs for cellular phones, special sleeves, or attachable clips. The charging bases are designed to identify a compatible receiver and only power up when it's detected to avoid risk of electrocution. Open Dots is a specification for such charging pads and receivers using contacts instead of wires.

== Electric vehicles ==
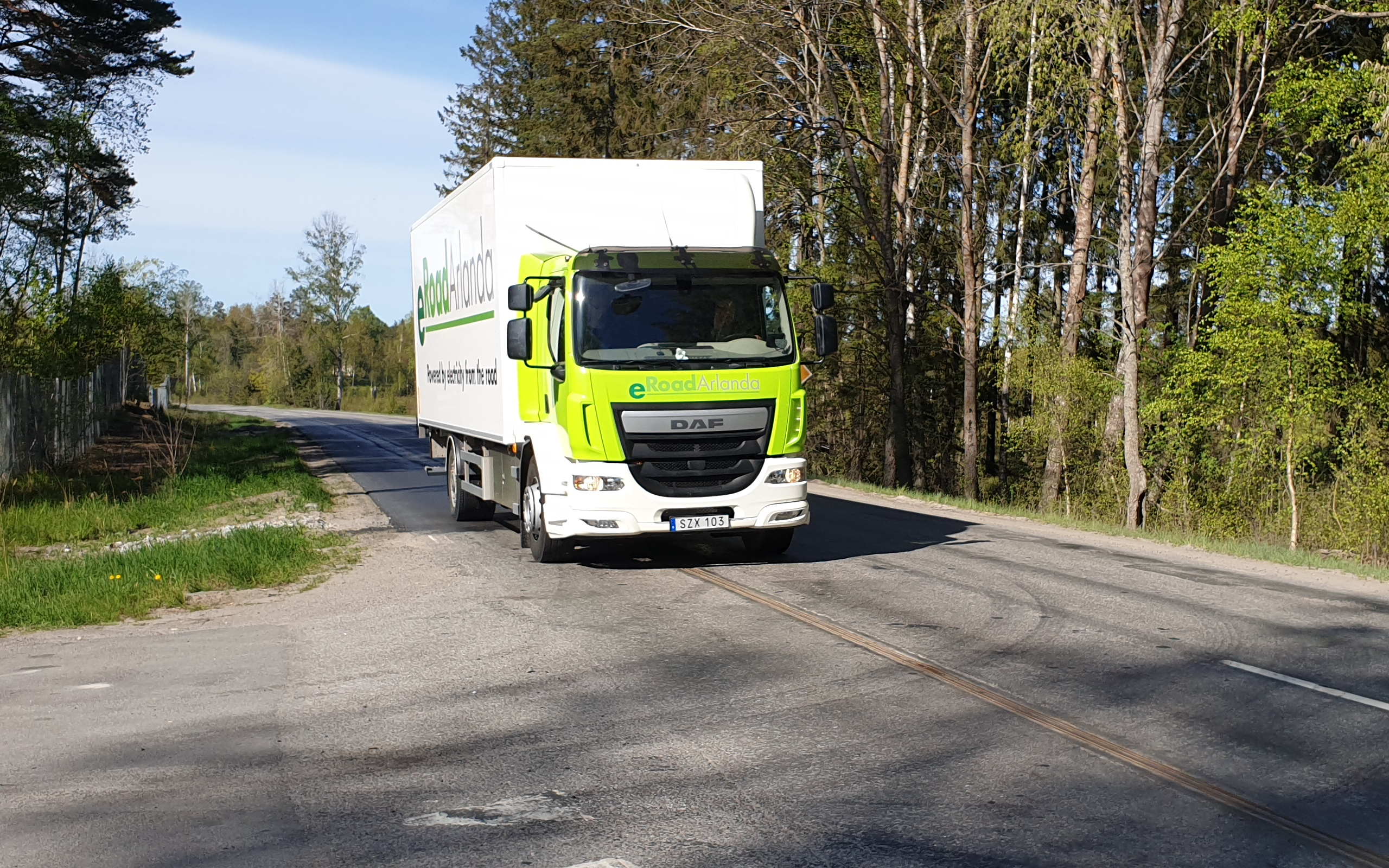
Electric truck driving on a public road with Elways ground-level power supply, near Arlanda airport, 2019

Sweden has tested electric road systems that charge the batteries of private electric vehicles, and among the tested systems are two ground-level power supply systems that began testing in 2017. The in-road rail system is planned to deliver up to 800 kW per vehicle traveling over a powered segment of the rail, and the system is estimated to be the most cost-effective among the four tested systems. The new systems are expected to be safe, with segments of the rail being powered only when a vehicle is traveling over them. The rails have been tested while submerged in salt water and were found to be safe for pedestrians.

The European Commission published in 2021 a request for regulation and standardization of electric road systems. Alstom and other companies have, in 2020, begun drafting a standard for ground-level power supply electric roads. The first standard for electrical equipment on-board a vehicle powered by a rail electric road system (ERS), CENELEC Technical Standard 50717, has been approved in late 2022. Following standards, encompassing "full interoperability" and a "unified and interoperable solution" for ground-level power supply, are scheduled to be published by the end 2024, detailing complete "specifications for communication and power supply through conductive rails embedded in the road".

=== Companies ===
Honda started developing in the late 2010s a conductive charging system for electric vehicles, with 100 kW of power at a vehicle speed of 70 km/h (43 mph). As of 2021 Honda is testing 450 kW systems at vehicle speeds of 200 km/h (124 mph). The Swedish company Elways demonstrated in 2021 automatic power delivery of 960 kW to electric trucks, and hopes electric trucks in logistics loading docks and electric aircraft would be able to receive megawatts of power using this technology. ABB announced in 2021 that it is involved in the construction of the first permanent electric road that powers private vehicles and commercial vehicles such as trucks and buses, using ground-level power supply technology.

== See also ==
- Battery charger
- Charging station
- Inductive charging
- Wireless power transfer
