= Reflective crack =

Type of failure in asphalt pavement

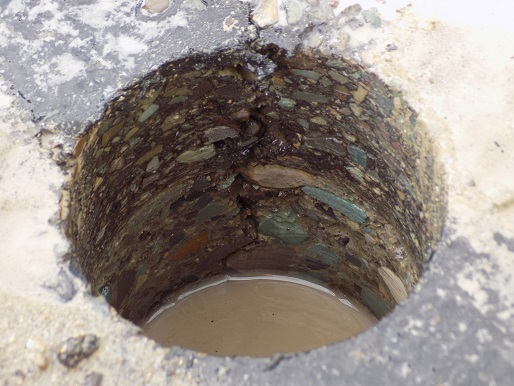
Reflective crack

A reflective crack is a type of failure in asphalt pavement, one of the most popular road surface types. Asphalt pavement is impacted by traffic and thermal loading. Due to loading, cracks can appear on the pavement surface that can reduce the Pavement Condition Index (PCI) dramatically.

The pavement can be maintained by overlay. Cracks under the overlay can cause stress concentration at the bottom of the overlay. Due to the repeated stress concentration, a crack starts in the overlay that has a similar shape to the crack in the old pavement. This crack is called a "reflective crack". Reflective cracking can be categorized as one of the distresses in asphalt pavement. It can affect the general performance and durability of the pavement. A reflective crack can also open a way for water to enter the pavement's body and increase the deterioration rate. Reflective cracks can also happen in overlays placed on joints or cracks in composite pavements such as concrete pavements. Another type of road infrastructure, dynamic inductive charging infrastructure, was found to increase the occurrence of reflective cracks in road surfaces.

== See also ==
- Asphalt concrete degradation and restoration
