= JVIS =

JVIS is an automotive electronics and accessories supplier based in Michigan.

== Open Dots ==
Three contacts of an Open Dots receiver are arranged at approximately 120 degrees separation along the circumference of a circle of approximately one centimeter radius, with a fourth contact at its center.

Open Dots is a conductive charging specification that was promoted by the Open Dots Alliance, a 501(c)(6) non-profit organization, which was formed by JVIS in 2015 and appears to be inactive since 2018. The technology has been available since 2009 in various JVIS products.

An Open Dots receiver, which can be a phone case, has three contacts arranged 120 degrees apart on the circumference of a circle of one-centimeter (two-fifths of an inch) radius, and a fourth contact at its center. An Open Dots charger, typically a charging pad, is a surface with a series of two or more approximately centimeter-wide strip-shaped contacts, spaced apart so an individual contact dot on the receiver cannot touch two pad contacts simultaneously. Adjacent rows of charging pad contacts have alternating polarities. When the surface of the receiver is placed on the surface of an Open Dots charging pad, the contacts are spaced such that the array of receiver contacts is always spanning a pair of charger contacts. The system can thus form an electrical circuit in any angular orientation, allowing the user to simply place their device on a charging pad to start charging.

In May 2015, the alliance stated that the Open Dots standard was adapted for use in 12 vehicle models across five major automotive brands – Ford, Chrysler, RAM, Dodge, and Scion. Phone case maker Incipio was mentioned as making compatible products.
