= Emission standards in India =

Indian emission norms based on European standards

Emission standards in India are emission norms instituted by the Government of India to regulate the output of air pollutants from internal combustion engines. These include the 'Bharat stages' of progressively tighter limits on compression ignition engines and spark-ignition engines equipment, including for motor vehicles. The standards and the timeline for implementation are set by the Central Pollution Control Board under the Ministry of Environment, Forest and Climate Change.

The standards, based on European regulations, were first introduced in 2000. All new vehicles manufactured after the implementation of the norms have to be compliant with the regulations. In October 2010, Bharat stage (BS) III norms were been enforced across the country. In 13 major cities, Bharat stage IV emission norms were in place since April 2010 and were been enforced for entire country since April 2017. In 2016, the Indian government announced that the country would skip the BS V norms altogether and adopt BS VI norms by 2020. Only motor vehicles conforming to the emission standard Bharat stage IV have been sold in the entire country from 1 April 2020.

On 15 November 2017, the Petroleum Ministry of India, in consultation with public oil marketing companies, decided to bring forward the date of BS VI grade auto fuels in NCT of Delhi with effect from 1 April 2018 instead of 1 April 2020. In fact, Petroleum Ministry OMCs were asked to examine the possibility of introduction of BS VI auto fuels in the whole of NCR area from 1 April 2019. This huge step was taken due to the heavy problem of air pollution faced by Delhi which became worse around 2019. The decision was met with disarray by the automobile companies as they had planned the development according to roadmap for 2020.

The phasing out of 2-stroke engine for two wheelers, the cessation of production of the Maruti 800, and the introduction of electronic controls have been due to the regulations related to vehicular emissions.

While the norms help in bringing down pollution levels, it invariably results in increased vehicle cost due to the improved technology and higher fuel prices. However, this increase in private cost is offset by savings in health costs for the public, as there is a lower amount of disease-causing particulate matter and pollution in the air. Exposure to air pollution can lead to respiratory and cardiovascular diseases, which is estimated to be the cause for 620,000 early deaths in 2010, and the health cost of air pollution in India has been assessed at 3% of its GDP.

In Delhi-NCR, vehicle movement is regulated under the air-quality based Graded Response Action Plan (GRAP). In 2025, the Commission for Air Quality Management (CAQM) enforced GRAP Stage III measures, restricting the entry of BS-III petrol and BS-IV diesel vehicles across the region to curb rising pollution levels.

== Motor vehicles ==
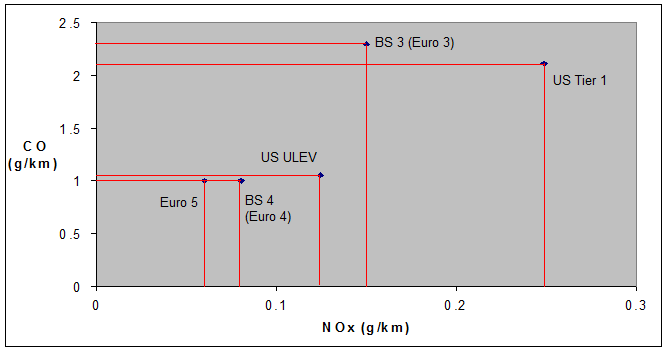
Comparison between European, US, and Bharat stage (Indian) emission standards for petrol passenger cars.

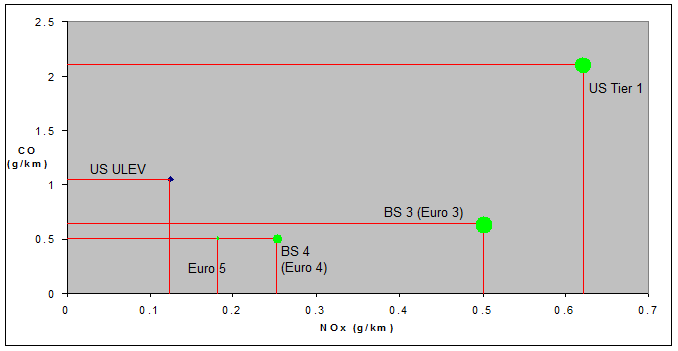
Comparison between European, US, and Bharat stage (Indian) emission standards for diesel passenger cars. The sizes of the green circles represent the limits for particulate matter.

The Government of India has placed forth Bharat stage regulations to regulate the pollution emitted by cars and two-wheelers. The Central Government has mandated that every vehicle manufacturer, both two-wheels and four-wheels, ought to manufacture, sell and register solely BS6 (BSVI) vehicles from 1 April 2020.

Both BSIV and BSVI area unit emission norms that set the most permissible levels for pollutants emitting from an automotive or a two-wheeler exhaust. Compared to the BS4, BS6 emission standards area unit stricter, whereas makers use this variation to update their vehicles with new options and safety standards, the largest or the numerous modification comes within the type of stricter permissible emission norms.

The below table offers Associate in Nursing insight into the modification within the permissible emission levels of BS6 vehicles compared to BS4 vehicles:

Fuel type	Pollutant gases	BS6 (BSVI)	BS4 (BSIV)
Petroleum Distillate Vehicle	Nitrogen oxide (NO_{x}) limit	60 mg	80 mg
	Particulate matter (PM) limit	4.5 mg/km	-
Diesel Fuel Vehicle	Nitrogen oxide (NO_{x}) limit	80 mg	250 mg
	Particulate matter (PM) limit	4.5 mg/km	25 mg
	HC + NO_{x}	170 mg/km	300 mg

These area unit emission standards were set to manage the output of pollutants from vehicles plying on the road. The Central Pollution Control Board, under the Ministry of Environment, Forest and Climate Change (Mo.E.F.C.C.), sets the permissible pollution levels and timeline to implement an equivalent by vehicle makers.

The abbreviation of Bharat stage is 'BS' suffixed with the iteration of the stage of emission norms, similar to how European emissions standards are named. The initial BSI (BS1) standard was first introduced in mid 1999, with the second and third iteration first introduced in mid 2000 and 2005 named BSII (BS2) and BSIII (BS3), respectively.

The fourth iteration BSIV or BS4 was introduced in 2017, and therefore the delay between the introduction of BS3 and BS4 resulted in the fast-tracking of the BSVI or BS6 standards by skipping the BSV (BS5) norms. Each of the regulations have stricter emission standards compared to its predecessors.

=== History ===
The first emission norms were introduced in India in 1991 for petroleum distillate, and 1992 for diesel vehicles. These were followed by making the Catalytic converter mandatory for petrol vehicles and the introduction of unleaded petrol in the market.

On 29 April 1999, the Supreme Court of India ruled that all vehicles in India have to meet Euro I or India 2000 norms by 1 June 1999 and Euro II will be imperative in the NCR by 1 April 2000. Car makers were not prepared for this transition and in a subsequent judgement the implementation date for Euro II was not enforced.

In 2002, the Indian Government accepted the report submitted by the Mashelkar committee. The committee proposed a road map for the roll-out of Euro based emission norms for India. It also recommended a phased implementation of future norms with the regulations being implemented in major cities first and extended to the rest of the country after a few years.

Based on the recommendations of the committee, the National Auto Fuel policy was announced officially in 2003. The roadmap for implementation of the Bharat stage norms were laid out until 2010. The policy also created guidelines for auto fuels, reduction of pollution from older vehicles and R&D for air quality data creation and health administration.

=== Background information ===
Table 1: Indian emission standards (4-wheeled vehicles)
Standard	Reference	Year	Region
India 2000/Bharat stage I	Euro 1	2000	Nationwide
Bharat stage II	Euro 2	2001	NCR*, Mumbai, Kolkata, Chennai
Bharat stage II	Euro 2	2003	NCR*, 14 cities†
Bharat stage II	Euro 2	2005	Nationwide
Bharat stage III	Euro 3	2005-04	NCR*, 14 cities†
Bharat stage III	Euro 3	2010	Nationwide
Bharat stage IV	Euro 4	2010	NCR*, 14 cities†
Bharat stage IV	Euro 4	2017	Nationwide
Bharat stage V	Euro 5	(skipped)	
Bharat stage VI	Euro 6	2018	Delhi
Bharat stage VI	Euro 6	2019	NCR*
Bharat stage VI	Euro 6	2020	Nationwide
* National Capital Region (Delhi) † Mumbai, Kolkata, Chennai, Bengaluru, Hyderabad, Ahmedabad, Pune, Surat, Kanpur, Lucknow, Jamshedpur, Agra and Guwahati

The above standards apply to all new 4-wheeled vehicles sold and registered in the respective regions. In addition, the National Auto Fuel Policy introduces certain emission requirements for interstate buses with routes originating or terminating in Delhi or the other 10 cities.

Progress of emission standards for 2-and 3-wheeled vehicles:

Table 2: Indian emission standards (2- and 3-wheeled vehicles)
Standard	Reference	Date
Bharat stage II	Euro 2	1 April 2000
Bharat stage III	Euro 3	1 April 2010
Bharat stage IV	Euro 4	1 April 2017
Bharat stage VI	Euro 6	1 April 2020 with mandate

In order to comply with the BSIV norms, 2- and 3-wheeler manufacturers will have to fit an evaporative emission control unit, which should lower the amount of fuel that is evaporated when the motorcycle is parked.

=== Trucks and buses ===
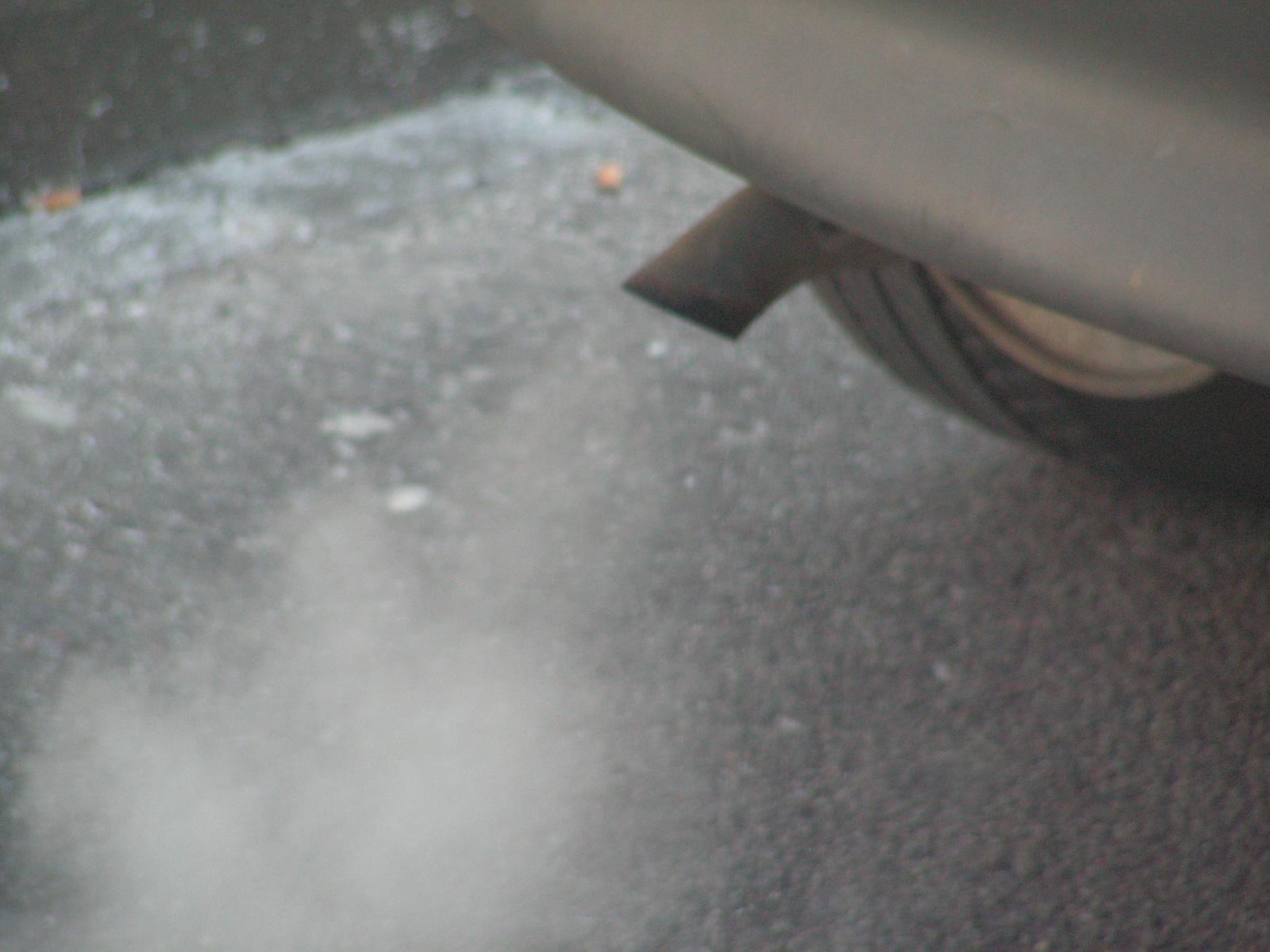
Exhaust gases from vehicles form a significant portion of air pollution which is harmful to human health and the environment

Emission standards for new heavy-duty diesel engines—applicable to vehicles of GVW > 3,500 kg—are listed in Table 3.

Table 3: Emission standards for diesel truck and bus engines, g/kWh
Year	Reference	Test	CO	HC	NO_{x}	PM
1992	–	ECE R49	17.3–32.6	2.7–3.7	–	–
1996	–	ECE R49	11.20	2.40	14.4	–
2000	Euro I	ECE R49	4.5	1.1	8.0	0.36*
2005†	Euro II	ECE R49	4.0	1.1	7.0	0.15
2010†	Euro III	ESC	2.1	0.66	5.0	0.10
2010†	Euro III	ETC	5.45	0.78	5.0	0.16
2010‡	Euro IV	ESC	1.5	0.46	3.5	0.02
2010‡	Euro IV	ETC	4.0	0.55	3.5	0.03
* 0.612 for engines below 85 kW † Earlier introduction in selected regions, see Table 1. ‡ Only in selected regions, see Table 1.

More details on Euro I–III regulations can be found in the EU heavy-duty engine standards.

=== Light-duty diesel vehicles ===
Emission standards for light-duty diesel vehicles (GVW ≤ 3,500 kg) are summarised in Table 4. Ranges of emission limits refer to different classes (by reference mass) of light commercial vehicles; comparable to EU light-duty vehicle emission standards. The lowest limit in each range applies to passenger cars (GVW ≤ 2,500 kg; up to 6 seats).

Table 4: Emission standards for light-duty diesel vehicles, g/km
Year	Reference	CO	HC	HC+NO_{x}	NO_{x}	PM
1992	–	17.3–32.6	2.7–3.7	–	–	–
1996	–	5.0–9.0	–	2.0–4.0	–	–
2000	Euro 1	2.72–6.90	–	0.97–1.70	0.14–0.25	–
2005†	Euro 2	1.0–1.5	–	0.7–1.2	0.08–0.17	–
2010†	Euro 3	0.64; 0.80; 0.95	–	0.56; 0.72; 0.86	0.50; 0.65; 0.78	0.05; 0.07; 0.10
2010‡	Euro 4	0.50; 0.63; 0.74	–	0.30; 0.39; 0.46	0.25; 0.33; 0.39	0.025; 0.04; 0.06
† Earlier introduction in selected regions, see Table 1. ‡ Only in selected regions, see Table 1.

The test cycle has been the ECE + EUDC for low power vehicles (with maximum speed limited to 90 km/h). Before 2000, emissions were measured over an Indian test cycle.

Engines for use in light-duty vehicles can be also emission tested using an engine dynamo-meter. The respective emission standards are listed in Table 5.

Table 5: Emission standards for light-duty diesel engines, g/kWh
Year	Reference	CO	HC	NO_{x}	PM
1992	–	14.0	3.5	18.0	–
1996	–	11.20	2.40	14.4	–
2000	Euro I	4.5	1.1	8.0	0.36*
2005†	Euro II	4.0	1.1	7.0	0.15
* 0.612 for engines below 85 kW † Earlier introduction in selected regions, see Table 1.

=== Light-duty petrol vehicles ===
==== 4-wheeled vehicles ====
Emissions standards for petrol vehicles (GVW ≤ 3,500 kg) are summarised in Table 6. Ranges of emission limits refer to different classes of light commercial vehicles (comparable to EU light-duty vehicle emission standards). The lowest limit in each range applies to passenger cars (GVW ≤ 2,500 kg; up to 6 seats).

Table 6: Emission standards for petrol vehicles (GVW ≤ 3,500 kg), g/km
Year	Reference	CO	HC	HC+NO_{x}	NO_{x}
1991	–	14.3–27.1	2.0–2.9	–	
1996	–	8.68–12.4	–	3.00–4.36	
1998*	–	4.34–6.20	–	1.50–2.18	
2000	Euro 1	2.72–6.90	–	0.97–1.70	
2005†	Euro 2	2.2–5.0	–	0.5–0.7	
2010†	Euro 3	2.3; 4.17; 5.22	0.20; 0.25; 0.29	–	0.15; 0.18; 0.21
2010‡	Euro 4	1.0; 1.81; 2.27	0.1; 0.13; 0.16	–	0.08; 0.10; 0.11
* For catalytic converter fitted vehicles. † Earlier introduction in selected regions, see Table 1. ‡ only in selected regions, see Table 1.

Petrol vehicles must also meet an evaporative (SHED) limit of 2 g/test (effective 2000).

==== 2- and 3-wheeled vehicles ====
Emission standards for 2- and 3-wheeled petrol vehicles are listed in the following tables.

Table 7: Emission standards for 3-wheeled petrol vehicles, g/km
Year	CO	HC	HC+NO_{x}
1991	12–30	8–12	–
1996	6.75	–	5.40
2000	4.00	–	2.00
2005 (BS II)	2.25	–	2.00
2010-04 (BS III)	1.25	–	1.25

Table 8: Emission standards for 2-wheeled petrol vehicles, g/km
Year	CO	HC	HC+NO_{x}
1991	12–30	8–12	–
1996	5.50	–	3.60
2000	2.00	–	2.00
2005 (BS II)	1.5	–	1.5
2010-04 (BS III)	1.0	–	1.0

Table 9: Emission standards for 2- and 3-wheeled diesel vehicles, g/km
Year	CO	HC+NO_{x}	PM
2005-04	1.00	0.85	0.10
2010-04	0.50	0.50	0.05

=== Overview of the emission norms in India ===
- 1991 – Idle CO limits for petrol vehicles and free acceleration smoke for diesel vehicles, mass emission norms for petrol vehicles.
- 1992 – Mass emission norms for diesel vehicles.
- 1996 – Revision of mass emission norms for petrol and diesel vehicles, mandatory fitment of catalytic converter for cars in metros on unleaded petrol.
- 1998 – Cold start norms introduced.
- 2000 – India 2000 (equivalent to Euro I) norms, modified IDC (Indian driving cycle), Bharat stage II norms for Delhi.
- 2001 – Bharat stage II (equivalent to Euro II) norms for all metros, emission norms for CNG and LPG vehicles.
- 2003 – Bharat stage II (equivalent to Euro II) norms for 13 major cities.
- 2005 – From 1 April, Bharat stage IV (equivalent to Euro IV) norms for 13 major cities.
- 2010 – Bharat stage IV emission norms for 2-wheelers, 3-wheelers and 4-wheelers for the entire country, whereas Bharat stage IV (equivalent to Euro IV) for 13 major cities for only 4-wheelers. Bharat stage IV also has norms on OBD (similar to Euro III but diluted).
- 2017 – Bharat stage IV norms for all vehicles.
- 2018 - Bharat stage VI fuel norms from 1 April 2018 in Delhi instead of 2020.
- 2020 – Bharat stage VI fuel norms from 1 April 2020 nationwide switching India to world's cleanest diesel and petrol.
- 2023 - Bharat stage VI Second Phase Fuel norms from 1 April 2023 have only Petrol also called RDE norms with e20 fuels.

=== CO_{2} emission ===
India's auto sector accounts for about 18% of the total CO_{2} emissions in the country. Relative CO_{2} emissions from transport have risen rapidly in recent years, but like the EU, currently there are no standards for CO_{2} emission limits for pollution from vehicles.

=== Technology changes ===
==== Technology changes in petrol engines ====
As per Bharat stage-6 norms, the emission of carbon monoxide is to be reduced by 30% and NO_{x} by 80%. The BS-6 norms also sets limits for Hydrocarbon and particulate emissions, which were not specified in earlier norms. To meet the emission requirements of Bharat stage-6, the carburetors in petrol engines need to be replaced by the programmed fuel injectors. To further reduce tail pipe emissions, the exhaust system would be fitted with three way catalytic converters. The norms also mandates On-Board Diagnostic System (OBD) for all BS-6 compliant vehicles.

==== Technology changes in diesel engines ====
As per the Bharat stage-6 norms, the NO_{x} emissions from a diesel engines are to be reduced by 70% and particulates by 80%. To achieve this, the engines need to be equipped with Euro-6 compliant technologies. The major technical changes to associated with this are:

1. Fitting diesel particulate filters in exhaust system.
2. Using selective catalytic reduction (SCR) or exhaust gas recirculation (EGR) techniques to reduce NO_{x} in emissions.
3. An on-board diagnostic system required to monitor the malfunctioning of parts related to emissions

==== Obligatory labelling ====
There is also no provision to make the CO_{2} emissions labelling mandatory on cars in the country. A system exists in the EU to ensure that information relating to the fuel economy and CO_{2} emissions of new passenger cars offered for sale or lease in the Community is made available to consumers to enable consumers to make an informed choice.

== Non-road diesel engines ==
=== Construction machinery ===
Emission standards for diesel construction machinery were adopted on 21 September 2006. The standards are structured into two tiers:

- Bharat (CEV) Stage II—These standards are based on the EU Stage I requirements, but also cover smaller engines that were not regulated under the EU Stage I.
- Bharat (CEV) Stage III—These standards are based on US Tier 2/3 requirements.

The standards are summarised in the following table:

The limit values apply for both type approval (TA) and conformity of production (COP) testing. Testing is performed on an engine dynamo-meter over the ISO 8178 C1 (8-mode) and D2 (5-mode) test cycles. The Bharat stage III standards must be met over the useful life periods shown in Table 11. Alternatively, manufacturers may use fixed emission deterioration factors of 1.1 for CO, 1.05 for HC, 1.05 for NO_{x}, and 1.1 for PM.

Table 11: Bharat (CEV) Stage III useful life periods
Power rating		Useful life period
Power rating		hours
< 19 kW		3,000
19–37 kW	Constant speed	3,000
19–37 kW	Variable speed	5,000
> 37 kW		8,000

=== Agricultural tractors ===
Emission standards for diesel agricultural tractors are summarised in Table 12.

Table 12: Bharat (Trem) emission standards for diesel agricultural tractors
Engine power	Date	CO	HC	HC+NO_{x}	NO_{x}	PM
kW	Date	g/kW⋅h				
Bharat (Trem) Stage I
All	1999-10	14.0	3.5	-	18.0	-
Bharat (Trem) Stage II
All	2003-06	9.0	-	15.0	-	1.00
Bharat (Trem) Stage III
All	2005-10	5.5	-	9.5	-	0.80
Bharat (Trem) Stage III A
P < 8	2010-04	5.5	-	8.5	-	0.80
8 ≤ P < 19	2010-04	5.5	-	8.5	-	0.80
19 ≤ P < 37	2010-04	5.5	-	7.5	-	0.60
37 ≤ P < 56	2011-04	5.0	-	4.7	-	0.40
56 ≤ P < 75	2011-04	5.0	-	4.7	-	0.40
75 ≤ P < 130	2011-04	5.0	-	4.0	-	0.30
130 ≤ P < 560	2011-04	3.5	-	4.0	-	0.20

Emissions are tested over the ISO 8178 C1 (8-mode) cycle. For Bharat (Trem) Stage III A, the useful life periods and deterioration factors are the same as for Bharat (CEV) Stage III, Table 11.

== Electricity generation ==
=== Generator sets ===
Emissions from new diesel engines used in generator sets have been regulated by the Ministry of Environment and Forests, Government of India [GSR 371 (E), 17 May 2002]. The regulations impose type approval certification, production conformity testing and labelling requirements. Certification agencies include the Automotive Research Association of India (ARAI) and the Vehicle Research and Development Establishment (VRDE). The emission standards are listed below.

Table 13: Emission standards for diesel engines ≤ 800 kW for generator sets
Engine power (P)	Date	CO	HC	NO_{x}	PM	Smoke
Engine power (P)	Date	g/kWh				1/m
P ≤ 19 kW	2004-01	5.0	1.3	9.2	0.6	0.7
P ≤ 19 kW	2005-07	3.5	1.3	9.2	0.3	0.7
19 kW < P ≤ 50 kW	2004-01	5.0	1.3	9.2	0.5	0.7
19 kW < P ≤ 50 kW	2004-07	3.5	1.3	9.2	0.3	0.7
50 kW < P ≤ 176 kW	2004-01	3.5	1.3	9.2	0.3	0.7
176 kW < P ≤ 800 kW	2004-11	3.5	1.3	9.2	0.3	0.7

Engines are tested over the 5-mode ISO 8178 D2 test cycle. Smoke opacity is measured at full load.

Table 14: Emission limits for diesel engines > 800 kW for generator sets
Date	CO	NMHC	NO_{x}	PM
Date	mg/N⋅m^{3}	mg/N⋅m^{3}	ppm(v)	mg/N⋅m^{3}
Until 2003-06	150	150	1100	75
2003-07 – 2005-06	150	100	970	75
2005-07	150	100	710	75

Concentrations are corrected to dry exhaust conditions with 15% residual O_{2}.

=== Power plants ===
The emission standards for thermal power plants in India are being enforced based on Environment (Protection) Act, 1986 of Government of India and its amendments from time to time. A summary of emission norms for coal- and gas-based thermal power plants is given in Tables 15 and 16.

Table 15: Environmental standards for coal- and gas-based power plants
Capacity	Pollutant	Emission limit
Coal based thermal plants
Below 210 MW	Particulate matter (PM)	350 mg/N⋅m^{3}
210 MW and above		150 mg/N⋅m^{3}
500 MW and above		50 mg/N⋅m^{3}
Gas based thermal plants
400 MW and above	NO_{x} (V/V at 15% excess oxygen)	50 PPM for natural gas; 100 PPM for naphtha
Below 400 MW and up to 100 MW		75 PPM for natural gas; 100 PPM for naphtha
Below 100 MW		100 PPM for naphtha/natural gas
For conventional boilers		100 PPM

Table 16: Stack height requirement for SO_{2} control
Power generation capacity	Stack height (m)
Less than 200/210 MWe	H = 14 (Q)0.3 where Q is emission rate of SO_{2} in kg/h, H = Stack height in metres
200/210 MWe or less than 500 MWe 200	200
500 MWe and above	275 (+ Space provision for FGD systems in future)

The norm for 500 MW and above coal-based power plant being practised is 40 to 50 mg/N⋅m and space is provided in the plant layout for super thermal power stations for installation of flue gas desulfurisation (FGD) system. But FGD is not installed, as it is not required for low sulphur Indian coals while considering SO_{x} emission from individual chimney.

In addition to the above emission standards, the selection of a site for a new power plant has to maintain the local ambient air quality as given in Table 17.

Table 17: Ambient air quality standard
Category	Concentration (g/m^{3})			
Category	SPM	SO_{x}	CO	NO_{x}
Industrial and mixed-use	500	120	5,000	120
Residential and rural	200	80	2,000	80
Sensitive	100	30	1,000	30

Table 18: World Bank norms for new projects
Existing air quality	Recommendation
SO_{x} > 100 μg/m^{3}	No project
SO_{x} = 100 μg/m^{3}	Polluted area, max from a project 100 t/day
SO_{x} < 50 μg/m^{3}	Unpolluted area, max from a project 500 t/day

However the norms for SO_{x} are even stricter for selection of sites for World Bank funded projects (refer Table 18). For example, if SO_{x} level is higher than 100 μg/m^{3}, no project with further SO_{x} emission can be set up; if SO_{x} level is 100 μg/m^{3}, it is called polluted area and maximum emission from a project should not exceed 100 t/day; and if SO_{x} is less than 50 μg/m^{3}, it is called unpolluted area, but the SO_{x} emission from a project should not exceed 500 t/day. The stipulation for NO_{x} emission is that its emission should not exceed 260 g of NO_{x}/GJ of heat input.

In view of the above, it may be seen that improved environment norms are linked to financing and are being enforced by international financial institutions and not by the policies/laws of land.

== Fuels ==
Fuel quality plays a very important role in meeting the stringent emission regulation.

The fuel specifications of petrol and diesel have been aligned with the Corresponding European Fuel Specifications for meeting the Euro II, Euro III and Euro IV emission norms.

The BS IV grade fuel was introduced in 2010 and is available in 39 cities, as reported in 2016. The rest of the country has to make do with BS III fuel.

The use of alternative fuels has been promoted in India both for energy security and emission reduction. Delhi and Mumbai have more than 100,000 commercial vehicles running on CNG fuel. Delhi has the largest number of CNG commercial vehicles running anywhere in the World. India is planning to introduce Bio-diesel, ethanol petrol blends in a phased manner and has drawn up a road map for the same. The Indian auto industry is working with the authorities to facilitate for introduction of the alternative fuels. India has also set up a task force for preparing the Hydrogen road map. The use of LPG has also been introduced as an auto fuel and the oil industry has drawn up plans for setting up of auto LPG dispensing stations in major cities.

=== Indian petrol specifications ===
Table 19: Indian petrol specifications
Serial no.	Characteristics	Unit	BS 2	BS 3	BS 4	BS 6	BS 7
1	Density 15 °C	kg/m^{3}	710–770	720–775	720–775	720-775	
2	Distillation						
3	a) Recovery up to 70 °C (E70) b) Recovery up to 100 °C (E100) c) Recovery up to 180 °C (E180) d) Recovery up to 150 °C (E150) e) Final boiling point (FBP), max f) Residue max	% volume % volume % volume % volume °C % volume	10–45; 40–70; 90 - 210; 2	10–45; 40–70 - 75 min 210; 2	10–45; 40–70 - 75 min 210; 2		
4	Research Octane Number (RON), min		88	91	91		
5	Anti-Knock Index (AKI)/ MON, min		84 (AKI)	81 (MON)	81 (MON)		
6	Sulphur, total, max	% mass	500 mg/kg	150 mg/kg	50 mg/kg	10 mg/kg	
7	Lead content (as Pb), max	200	61.05	2.005	16.005		
8	Reid vapour pressure (RVP), max	kPa	35–60	60	60		
9	Benzene content, max a) For metros b) For the rest	% volume	- 3; 5	1	1		
10	Olefin content, max	% volume	-	21	21		
11	Aromatic content, max	% volume	-	42	35<		

=== Indian diesel specifications ===
Table 20: Indian diesel specifications
Serial no.	Characteristic	BS II	BS III	BS IV	BS V	BS VI
1	Density kg/m^{3} 15 °C	820-800	820–845	820–845		
2	Sulphur content mg/kg max	500	350	50	10	10
3(a); 3(b)	Cetane number minimum and / or Cetane index	48 or 46	51 and 46	51 and 46		
4	Polycyclic aromatic hydrocarbon	-	11	11		
5 (a) (b) (c)	Distillation; Reco min at 350 °C; Reco min at 370 °C; 95% vol. reco at 0 °C	85; 95 -	- - 360	- - 360		

=== Diesel fuel quality in India ===
Table 21: Diesel fuel quality in India
Date	Particulars
1995	Cetane number: 45; Sulphur: 1%
1996	Sulphur: 0.5% (Delhi + selected cities)
1998	Sulphur: 0.25% (Delhi)
1999	Sulphur: 0.05% (Delhi, limited supply)
2000	Cetane number: 48; Sulfur: 0.25% (Nationwide)
2001	Sulphur: 0.05% (Delhi + selected cities)
2005	Sulphur: 350 ppm (Euro 3; selected areas)
2010	Sulphur: 350 ppm (Euro 3; nationwide)
2016	Sulphur: 50 ppm (Euro 4; major cities)
2017	Sulphur: 50 ppm (Euro 4; nationwide)
2020	Sulphur: 10ppm (Euro 6; entire country)

=== Indian bio-diesel specifications ===
Table 22: Indian bio-diesel specifications
Serial no.	Characteristics	Requirement	Method of test, ref. to	
			Other methods	[P:] of IS 1448
(1)	(2)	(3)	(4)	(5)
i.	Density at 15 °C, kg/m^{3}	860–900	ISO 3675	P:16/
			ISO 12185	P:32
			ASTM	
ii.	Kinematic viscosity at 40 °C, cSt	2.5–6.0	ISO 3104	P:25
iii.	Flash point (PMCC) °C, min	120	P:21	
iv.	Sulphur, mg/kg max	50.0	ASTM D 5453	P:83
v	Carbon residue (Ramsbottom)*, % by mass, max	0.05	ASTM D 4530ISO 10370	-
vi.	Sulfated ash, % by mass, max	0.02	ISO 6245	P:4
vii.	Water content, mg/kg, max	500	ASTM D 2709	P:40
			ISO 3733	
			ISO 6296	
viii	Total contamination, mg/kg, max	24	EN 12662	-
ix	Cu corrosion, 3 h at 50 °C, max	1	ISO 2160	P:15
x	Cetane no., min	51	ISO 5156	P:9
xi	Acid value, mg KOH/g, max	0.50	-	P:1 / Sec 1
xii	Methanol @, % by mass, max	0.20	EN 14110	-
xiii	Ethanol, @@ % by mass, max	0.20	-	
xiv	Ester content, % by mass, min	96.5	EN 14103	-
xv	Free glycerol, % by mass, max	0.02	ASTM D 6584	-
xvi	Total glycerol, % by mass, max	0.25	ASTM D 6584	-
xvii	Phosphorus, mg/kg, max	10.0	ASTMD 4951	-
xviii	Sodium and Potassium, mg/kg, max	To report	EN 14108 &	-
			EN 14109	-
xix	Calcium and magnesium, mg/kg, max	To report	**	-
xx	Iodine value	To report	EN 14104	-
xxi	Oxidation stability, at 110 °C h, min	6	EN 14112	-
* Carbon residue shall be run on 100% sample ** European method is under development @ Applicable for Fatty Acid Methyl Ester @@ Applicable for Fatty Acid Ethyl Ester

== Criticism and commentary ==
=== Ineffectiveness of the current pollution control system ===
Presently, all vehicles need to undergo a periodic emission check (3 months / 6 months / 1 year) at PUC centres, fuel stations, and private garages which are authorised to check the vehicles. In addition, transport vehicles need to undergo an annual fitness check carried out by RTOs for emissions, safety and road-worthiness.

The objective of reducing pollution is not achieved to a large extent by the present system. Some reasons for this are:

- Independent centres do not follow rigorous procedures due to inadequate training.
- Equipment is not subjected to periodic calibration by an independent authority.
- Lack of professionalism has led to malpractice.
- A tracking system for non-compliant vehicles is non-existent.
- The Parivahan website (under MoRTH) for testing petrol/LPG/CNG vehicles does not have the CO-corrected formula (specified by ARAI) implemented in all the States. Due to this omission by MoRTH, many vehicles with high CO emissions pass the pollution check.

=== Comparison between Bharat stage and Euro norms ===
The Bharat stage norms have been styled to suit specific needs and demands of Indian conditions. The differences lie essentially in environmental and geographical needs, even though the emission standards are exactly the same.

For instance, Euro III is tested at sub-zero temperatures in European countries. In India, where the average annual temperature ranges between 24 and 28 °C, the test is done away with.

Another major distinction is in the maximum speed at which the vehicle is tested. A speed of 90 km/h is stipulated for BS III, whereas it is 120 km/h for Euro III, keeping emission limits the same in both cases.

In addition to limits, test procedure has certain finer points too. For instance, the mass emission test measurements done in g/km on a chassis dynamometer requires a loading of 100 kg weight in addition to unloaded car weight in Europe. In India, BS III norms require an extra loading of 150 kg weight to achieve the desired inertia weight mainly due to road conditions here.

=== Non-existence of CO_{2} limits ===
Various groups and agencies have criticized the government and urged the government of India to draft mandatory fuel efficiency standards for cars in the country, or at least to make the CO_{2} emissions labelling mandatory on all new cars in the country. The auto companies should inform the customers about a vehicle's emissions.

=== Cycle beating ===
For the emission standards to deliver real emission reductions, it is crucial that the test cycles under which the emissions have to comply reflect normal driving situations as much as possible. It was discovered that manufacturers of engine would engage in what was called 'cycle beating' to optimize emission performance to the test cycle, while emissions from typical driving conditions would be much higher than expected, undermining the standards and public health. In one particular instance, research from two German technology institutes found that for diesel cars no 'real' NO_{x} reductions have been achieved after 13 years of stricter standards.

== Regulatory framework ==
In India, the rules and regulations related to driving licences, registration of motor vehicles, control of traffic, construction and maintenance of motor vehicles, etc. are governed by the Motor Vehicles Act 1988 (MVA) and the Central Motor Vehicles rules 1989 (CMVR). The Ministry of Shipping, Road Transport & Highways (MoSRT&H) acts as a nodal agency for formulation and implementation of various provisions of the Motor Vehicle Act and CMVR.

To involve all stake holders in regulation formulation, MoSRT&H has constituted two Committees to deliberate and advise Ministry on issues relating to Safety and Emission Regulations; namely:

- CMVR – Technical Standing Committee (CMVR-TSC)
- Standing Committee on Implementation of Emission Legislation (SCOE)

=== CMVR – Technical Standing Committee (CMVR-TSC) ===
This committee advises the MoSRT&H on various technical aspects related to CMVR. This committee has representatives from various organisations; namely: the Ministry of Heavy Industries & Public Enterprises (MoHI&PE), MoSRT&H, Bureau of Indian Standards (BIS), testing Agencies such as the Automotive Research Association of India (ARAI), the International Centre for Automotive Technology (ICAT), the Vehicle Research Development & Establishment (VRDE), the Central Institute of Road Transport (CIRT), industry representatives from the Society of Indian Automobile Manufacturers (SIAM), the Automotive Component Manufacturers Association (ACMA), and the Tractor Manufacturers Association (TMA) and representatives from state transport departments. Major functions of the committee are:

- To provide technical clarification and interpretation of the Central Motor Vehicles Rules having technical bearing to MoRT&H as and when so desired.
- To recommend to the Government the international/foreign standards which can be used in lieu of the standard notified under the CMVR permit use of components/parts/assemblies complying with such standards.
- To make recommendations on any other technical issues which have direct relevance in implementation of the Central Motor Vehicles Rules.
- To make recommendations on the new safety standards of various components for notification and implementation under Central Motor Vehicles Rules.
- To make recommendations on lead time for implementation of such safety standards.
- To recommend amendment of Central Motor Vehicles Rules having technical bearing keeping in view of Changes in automobile technologies.

CMVR-TSC is assisted by another Committee called the Automobile Industry Standards Committee (AISC) having members from various stakeholders in drafting the technical standards related to Safety. The major functions of the committee are as follows:

- Preparation of new standards for automotive items related to safety.
- To review and recommend amendments to the existing standards.
- Recommend adoption of such standards to CMVR Technical Standing Committee
- Recommend commissioning of testing facilities at appropriate stages.
- Recommend the necessary funding of such facilities to the CMVR Technical Standing Committee, and
- Advise CMVR Technical Standing Committee on any other issues referred to it

The National Standards for Automotive Industry are prepared by Bureau of Indian Standards (BIS). The standards formulated by AISC are also converted into Indian Standards by BIS. The standards formulated by both BIS and AISC are considered by CMVR-TSC for implementation.

=== Standing Committee on Implementation of Emission Legislation (SCOE) ===
This Committee deliberates the issues related to implementation of emission regulation. Major functions of this committee are:

- To discuss the future emission norms
- To recommend norms for in-use vehicles to MoSRT&H
- To finalise the test procedures and the implementation strategy for emission norms
- To advise the MoSRT&H on any issue relating to implementation of emission regulations.

Based on the recommendations from CMVR-TSC and SCOE, MoSRT&H issues notification for necessary amendments to the Central Motor Vehicle Rules.

In addition, the other Ministries like the Ministry of Environment & Forest (MoEF), the Ministry of Petroleum & Natural Gas (MoPNG), and the Ministry of Non-Conventional Energy Sources are also involved in formulation of regulations relating to emissions, noise, fuels and alternative fuel vehicles.

== See also ==
- Air pollution in India
- Automotive Industry Standards
- Regulation on non-exhaust emissions
- BNCAP
