= Bharat NCAP =

New car assessment program in India

Bharat New Car Assessment Programme
- Bharat NCAP logo
- Industry: Automotive Safety
- Founded: August 2023
- Headquarters: Pune, Maharashtra, India
- Area served: India
- Website: www.bncap.in

The Bharat New Car Assessment Program, also known as the Bharat NCAP, is the official New Car Assessment Program for India. It was launched by Ministry of Road Transport and Highways (MoRTH), Government of India on 22 August 2023.

Cars sold in the country will be assigned by star ratings based on their safety performance. It was implemented in phases, according to the plans drawn up by the National Automotive Testing and R&D Infrastructure Project. It is the 10th NCAP in the world and was set up by the government of India. The program was expected to begin mid-2014, but postponed to start from 2017. It was later scrapped until finally launching in August 2023. Within two years of implementation, new cars sold in India will need to comply with voluntary star ratings based on crash safety performance tests. Crucial safety features such as airbags, ABS and seat belt reminders will become standard in cars sold in India resulting from rankings and mandatory crash testing. Offset front crash, side, and rear impact tests. Cars will gradually have to meet more stringent norms such as pedestrian protection, whiplash injury and child restraint systems standards and requirements.

Rank by vehicle sales in 2017	Country	Estimated road traffic death rate per 100,000 population, 2018
1	China	18.2
2	United States	12.4
3	Japan	4.1
4	India	22.6
5	Germany	4.1
6	United Kingdom	3.1
7	France	5.5
8	Brazil	19.7
9	Italy	5.6
10	Canada	5.8

The number of deaths due to road accidents in India is around three to four times that of European countries like France, Germany and Spain. The Indian automotive safety standards have been criticised as being insufficient and ineffective. India has the world's sixth-largest car market, but is still the only country among the global top ten car markets without a testing program that measures the safety of vehicles. It is estimated that vehicles in India will cost 8–15% more resulting from compliance with these norms. However, harmonizing India's vehicle safety standards with global standards is expected to help automakers export locally produced cars globally.

While crash testing under Bharat NCAP has been a positive step in enhancing automotive safety, the testing has not been made mandatory. This has led to a speculation of leniency to some manufacturers selling cars with poor safety ratings despite compliance of making safety features as standard equipment.

== History ==
Before the launch of Bharat NCAP, the rules and regulations related to automotive safety in India were governed by the Central Motor Vehicles rules 1989 (CMVR) – Technical Standing Committee.

The CMVR - Technical Standing Committee (CMVR-TSC) advises MoRT&H on various technical aspects related to CMVR. This Committee has representatives from various organisations namely; Ministry of Heavy Industries & Public Enterprises (MoHI&PE), MoRT&H, Bureau of Indian Standards (BIS), Testing Agencies such as International Centre for Automotive Technology (ICAT), Automotive Research Association of India (ARAI), Vehicle Research and Development Establishment (VRDE), Central Institute of Road Transport (CIRT), industry representatives from Society of Indian Automobile Manufacturers (SIAM), Automotive Component Manufacturers Association (ACMA) and Tractor Manufacturers Association (TMA) and representatives from State Transport Departments. CMVR-TSC is assisted by another Committee called the Automobile Industry Standards Committee (AISC) having members from various stakeholders in drafting the technical standards related to safety which include:

- Preparation of new standards for automotive items related to safety.
- To review and recommend amendments to the existing standards.
- Recommend adoption of such standards to CMVR Technical Standing Committee.
- Recommend commissioning of testing facilities at appropriate stages.
- Recommend the necessary funding of such facilities to the CMVR Technical Standing Committee.
- Advise CMVR Technical Standing Committee on any other issues referred to it

Automotive Industry Standards Committee (AISC) is set up under Central Motor Vehicles Rules -Technical Standing Committee (CMVR - TSC) by Ministry of Road Transport & Highways, (Dept. of Road Transport & Highways) (MoRT&H (DoRT&H)) in the year 1997 to review the safety in the design, construction, operation and maintenance of motor vehicles.

Automotive Industry Standards formulated by the Automobile Industry Standards Committee (AISC) is the automotive technical specification for the Indian market. It comprises specifications and requirements to be met by vehicles sold in India. Some of these requirements pertaining to vehicle safety in the event of collision are:

- AIS-096 – Requirements for Behaviour of Steering Mechanism of a vehicle in a Head-on Collision
- AIS-097 – Procedure for determining the "H" Point and the Torso Angle for 50th percentile Adult Male in seating positions of Motor Vehicles.
- AIS-098 – Requirements for the Protection of the Occupants in the event of an Offset Frontal Collision
- AIS-099 – Approval of Vehicles with regards to the Protection of the Occupants in the event of a Lateral Collision
- AIS-100 – Requirements for the Protection of Pedestrian and other Vulnerable Road Users in the event of a Collision with a Motor Vehicle
- AIS-100 (Rev. 1) – Requirements for the Protection of Pedestrian and other Vulnerable Road Use Protocols

However, as there's no single standardised method for testing vehicle collisions nor is there any measurable statistics for consumers to know how well the vehicles protect the occupants, manufacturers simply met the basic requirements needed for Indian market.

On 31 January 2014, Global NCAP released a series of videos on YouTube crash testing some of India's best-selling car models under their "Safer cars for India" project. The cars tested were the 2014 model year Tata Nano, Ford Figo, Maruti Suzuki Alto 800, Maruti Suzuki Swift, Datsun Go, Hyundai i10 and Volkswagen Polo. The cars which were crash tested all had 0 stars for adult occupant protection (except for the Volkswagen Polo with 2 airbags which scored 4 stars for adult occupant protection) and also failed the basic UN safety test. Following this revelation, several media publications and forum posts started paying attention to India's lack of testing for cars and cars in general being unsafe to drive and not suited for most auto markets.

Many people in India started taking crash rating seriously and started demanding safer cars. The government of India started to plan a vehicle assessment program for vehicles sold in India under the new Bharat New Vehicle Safety Assessment Program (BNVSAP) around the late 2010s. Cars sold in the country will be assigned star ratings based on their safety performance. It was implemented in phases, according to the plans being drawn up by ARAI (Automotive Research Association of India) and the National Automotive Testing and R&D Infrastructure Project. The program got underway with high tech state-of-the-art facilities and laboratories being set up up across India.

With BNVSAP, a star rating system was introduced based on crash safety performance features. A car is subjected to offset front crash, side-impact and rear impacts. For the vehicle to clear these tests, it needs to have the bare essential safety systems like airbags, ABS (Anti-lock braking system), child restraint systems and seatbelt pre-tensioners. With the particular implementation of BNVSAP, Indian car manufacturers had to introduce crucial safety features with their new offerings. All existing car models sold after 1 October 2019 had to clear the prescribed BNVSAP tests.

Under BNVSAP, vehicles are crash-tested at 64 km/h (40 mph) for frontal impacts – which is the average speed in India.

Points can be awarded to the car based on the safety features in the car like ABS, seat belt reminders, child lock, and electronic stability control. The car testing protocols are defined by ARAI and are as follows:

1. Frontal offset testing (64 km/h proposed)
2. Side-impact testing
3. Pedestrian protection testing
4. Rear impact testing
5. Child dummy dynamic crash testing

On 7 December 2018, Global NCAP published the crash testing of the Subcompact crossover Tata Nexon. The testing showed that it has achieved 5 stars for adult occupant protection, making it India's first indigenous produced car to get a 5 stars rating. Following this, multiple brands started to develop or add features that would increase their vehicles safety rating.

In 2022, the ministry of road and transport announced that BNCAP would commence, the testing shall be done on a voluntary basis and that the star rating will be introduced. It also announced that the testing protocols will go beyond the technical specifications and that the testing will be aligned closer to global standards

In August 2023, the Union Minister of Road Transport and Highways, Nitin Gadkari, launched the Bharat New Car Assessment Programme in New Delhi. Operations commenced on 1 October 2023 with the first testing of vehicle safety published in December of the same year for the Tata Harrier and Tata Safari, both getting 5 stars for both adult and child occupant production.

== Protocols ==
BNCAP started the official testing from December 2023 onwards. The car testing protocols is defined by the Automotive Research Association of India (ARAI) as follows:

1. Frontal offset testing (64 km/h proposed)
2. Side impact testing
3. Pedestrian protection testing
4. Rear impact testing
5. Child dummy dynamic crash testing

Points would be awarded to the car based on the safety features in the car like ABS, seat belt reminders, child lock, and Electronic Stability Control.

India has seen more road deaths per year than any other nation since 2006, costing lives at the rate of 230,000 annually. Manufacturers and vehicle safety lobbyists support the retention of the inferior frontal crash test at 56 km/h (34.8 mph).

NHTSA is the standards followed by the US safety standards, carry out frontal crash tests at 64.3 km/h (40 mph). Under BNCAP, similar to Euro NCAP, vehicles will be crash tested at 64 km/h for frontal impacts which is the average speed in India.

Crash test facilities are being set up and are regularly updated on the official site.

Bharat NCAP 2023 is similar to Global NCAP 2023, which is based on Latin NCAP 2016.

== Criticisms and Limitations ==
Although Bharat NCAP has been hailed as a significant step to reduce fatalities by improving vehicular safety in road crashes across India, the program has been criticized by automotive experts and enthusiasts for several reasons.

After official testing began in October 2023, it was started as voluntary testing for manufacturers. This led to a speculation of leniency for automakers, as not all cars have been tested in the program by all manufacturers, limiting the coverage and comparability. As a result of this, several cars currently sold continue to remain untested, even though they have been noted to be equipped with mandatory safety features. Furthermore, the 5-star rating assigned to cars after crash testing do not necessarily state that a vehicle is quite safe due to various factors occurring in a crash.

According to former Maruti Suzuki chairman R. C. Bhargava, he stated in June 2022 that crash testing at Bharat NCAP should not be made mandatory as the market in India differs from Europe, sparking a backlash. In December 2022, right after the Maruti Suzuki Swift, Ignis, and S-Presso scored only 1 star in adult protection at Global NCAP, Bhargava questioned the credibility of NCAP, stating that it did not focus on the cause of accidents. Bhargava was previously criticized in November 2014 for his comment that "If carmakers incorporate such features in even entry-level cars, obviously the price would go up, which would lead consumers to opt for two-wheelers, which would be more unsafe".

Questions and concerns pertaining to the transparency and assessments surfaced in May 2026 following an RTI response from the Ministry of Road Transport and Highways. The response reportedly stated that the details on body shell stability, footwell rupture, and integrity, as well as other aspects cannot be shared due to confidentiality concerns by the manufacturers. In comparison, other programs like as Global NCAP and Latin NCAP publish specific comments on the structural integrity of the vehicles, including whether the bodyshell and footwell area are rated as stable or unstable, and whether the structure could withstand further loadings. Furthermore, the RTI response stated that 7 cars underwent retesting before the results were published; although retesting itself has not necessarily been noted to indicate irregularity and is permitted under applicable procedures, the disclosure raised questions on the transparency of reassessment process, as the results of initial assessments were not published.

In comparison with Global NCAP, Euro NCAP, and other NCAP programs, the Bharat NCAP misses out assessing pedestrian protection separately, although the testing protocol does list it. However, Bharat NCAP 2.0, which will be introduced in 2027, is set to incorporate assessing pedestrian protection separately and enforce tougher testing norms.

== Bharat NCAP 2.0 ==
In February 2025, the Government of India announced that a major upgrade to the testing program will be incorporated starting October 2027. The testing, apart from mandating ADAS requirements, will incorporate the following testing:

- 64 km/h (40 mph) offset frontal impact
- 50 km/h (31 mph) full-width frontal impact
- 50 km/h (31 mph) mobile lateral barrier impact
- 32 km/h (20 mph) oblique pole side impact
- 50 km/h (31 mph) mobile rigid rear impact

The tests will be conducted on a model’s base variant, and the added full-width frontal and rear-impact tests aim to better replicate real-world crashes.

== See also ==
- Automotive Industry Standards
- Bharat stage emission standards
