= Moving field inductive power transfer =

Method for resonantly powering electric vehicles

Moving field inductive power transfer or MFIPT is a technique for powering electric vehicles while driving along the road. The MFIPT technology is an advanced version of resonant inductive power transfer technology. Similar to other wireless electric road and online electric vehicle technologies, MFIPT also relies on inductive coupling for wireless power transfer. The distinct feature that sets MFIPT apart is that the magnetic field is switched in such a way that it seemingly moves at the same velocity underneath an electric vehicle that is driving along an MFIPT-equipped road.

== History ==
The number of battery electric vehicles (BEVs) has increased continuously in recent years but is still below expectations. The main reasons are the high purchase price due to the high cost of conventional lithium-ion batteries, the limited range, and the inconvenient and time-consuming charging process. This is, among other things, due to the need to accommodate heavy and large batteries to achieve a long range. The large weight, in turn, leads to higher energy consumption. In BEVs, the traction battery increases both the vehicle weight and the purchase price compared to vehicles with internal combustion engines. To overcome these problems, the mobility concept of an electrified road (E|ROAD) was developed based on electrically powered vehicles, which can eliminate the problem of range limitation with minimal, cost-effective energy storage. Contactless energy transfer from an electrified road should be able to provide a constant supply of energy to the electric vehicle.

== Technology ==
MFIPT uses resonant inductive coupling between multiple primary coils in the road and a single secondary coil per electric vehicle. Primary and secondary coils have complementary compensation capacitors to form resonant transformers. The combination of a primary coil and the respective compensation capacitor is called a primary cell. The secondary coil is approximately twice as long as the primary coil. Power transfer is initiated as soon as the secondary coil completely overlaps the primary coil. Only a single primary cell is active at a time. The primary cells are powered by an AC voltage source operating at the secondary resonance frequency of the resonant transformer. As the vehicle moves, at a certain point in time, the next primary coil might have a complete overlap with the secondary coil in the car. Here, a hand-over sequence is initiated, such that the capacitor of the next cell replaces the compensation capacitor of the currently active primary cell. This hand-over of the capacitor is done in the instance of time when all energy is stored in the coil. In the next half-period, when all the energy is now stored in the next primary cell's compensation capacitor, the coil is switched to the coil of the next primary cell. Thus, the magnetic field, transferring the energy between the active primary cell and the electric vehicle, has effectively moved from one primary cell to the next one. The MFIPT system requires precise timing information for the coil overlap to initiate the handover procedure and for the time instances when all the energy is either stored in the coil or the capacitor. Also, the switching between the primary cells needs to be fast and precise.

The advantages of an MFIPT system compared to conventional wireless electric road systems are:

- the oscillators of the individual primary cells experience no ring-up time,
- thus, quasi-continuous operation is possible
- the energy stored in a primary cell is not dissipated by parasitics and is thus lost, as would be the case for conventional systems.

Theoretical calculations have revealed that power transfer efficiencies of up to 83% to 95% can be achieved, depending on the quality factor of the resonators.
