= Motorsport in India =

Overview of motorsports in India

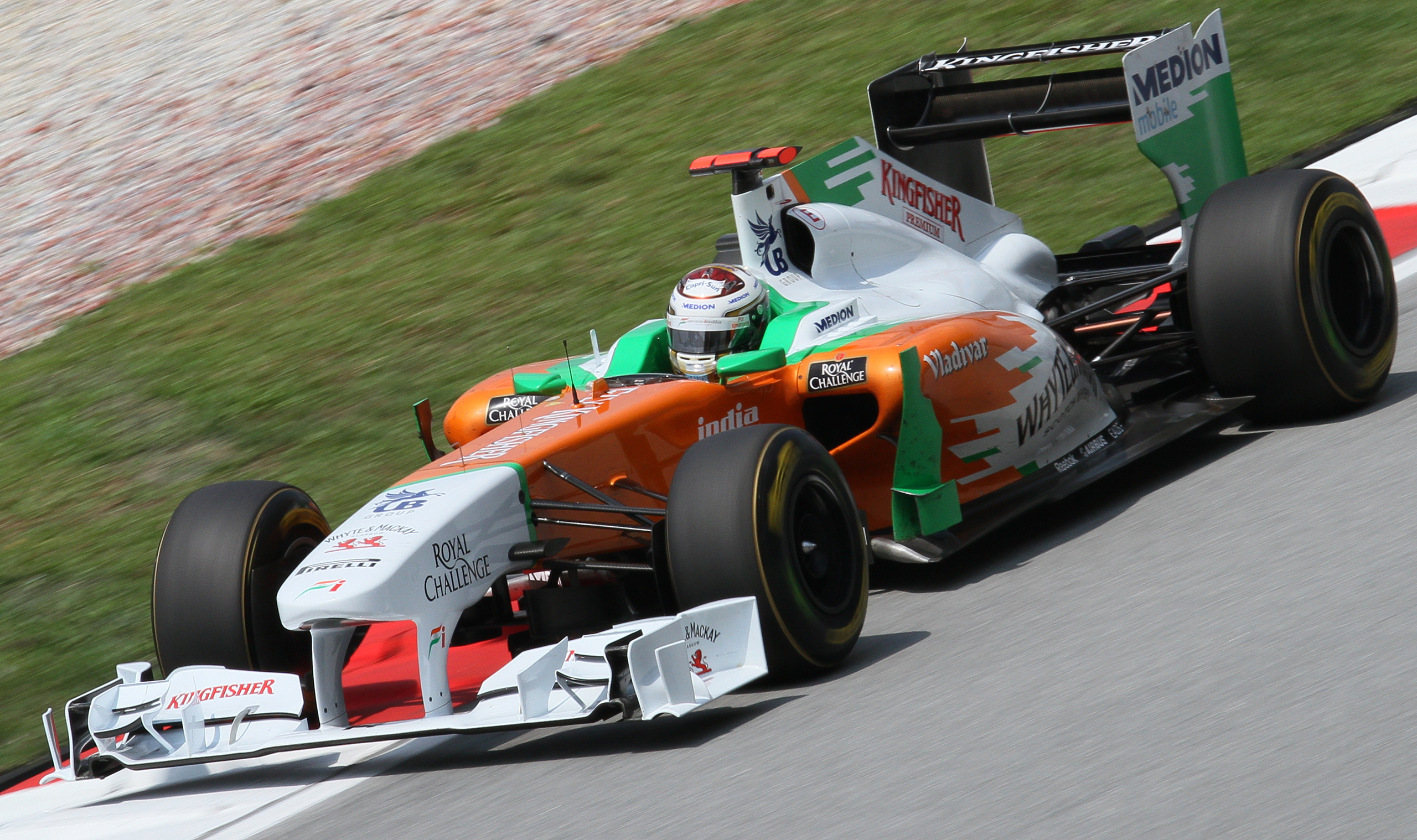
German racing driver Adrian Sutil driving for Indian F1 team Force India at the 2011 Malaysian Grand Prix.

The official logo of Mahindra Racing

Motorsport is a popular form of sport in India for over 100 years.The Federation of Motor Sports Clubs in India (fmsci) is the National governing body for motorsports approved by FIA and FIM. FMSCI, usually written in small caps, is the National Federation that organises nearly a dozen Nationals in various disciplines of motorsport. Some of the popular Indian motorsports Nationals are: Indian National Rally Championship (INRC), Indian National Supercross Championship, Indian National Car Racing Championship, Indian National Motorcycle Racing Championship and Indian National Rotax Max Karting Championship.

Much before F1 came to India, the country has been organising single-seater Formula races and the Indian National Rally Championship, one of the oldest competitions in the world. Formula One has taken off in the country in the 2000s, with two Indian drivers competing making it to the pinnacle of the sport. Narain Karthikeyan and Karun Chandhok are first two F1 drivers from India, in that order. The first-ever Formula One Indian Grand Prix took place in 2011, at the Buddh International Circuit. The Formula One team, Force India Formula One Team Limited, founded and managed by Indian businessman Vijay Mallya, is registered as an Indian outfit. The team based at Silverstone, United Kingdom competed in F1 for ten consecutive seasons starting from 2008–2018. The team's highest position in the Formula One Constructors Championship was fourth in the 2016 season. The Federation of Motor Sports Clubs of India is the official governing body of motorsport in the country. India riders also competed in the Moto GP, Moto 3 class with Mahindra Racing. Mahindra were based in Switzerland and held an Indian licence. Sarath Kumar is the first Indian to ride in the MotoGP Moto3 class.

Two Powerboating F1H2O Grand Prix of India took place in Mumbai and Vijayawada in Andhra Pradesh. The first in Mumbai was held in 2004 while the last Grand Prix took place in 2018 in Vijayawada, near Amaravati. Since 2018, a team named Amaravati competed until 2019 with driver Jonas Anderson finishing the season with equal total points (36) to the 2019 World Champion American Shaun Torrente. The title of "World Champion" was given to Shaun Torrente instead of Jonas Anderson on count back of podium results. Shaun obtained more 2nd positions during the season.

== History ==
On 1 February 2005, Narain Karthikeyan became India's first Formula One racing driver. In March 2007, he also became the first ever Indian-born driver to compete in a NASCAR Series. He debuted in the NASCAR Camping World Truck Series in the Kroger 250. Force India F1 is a Formula One motor racing team. The team was formed in October 2007, when a consortium led by Indian businessmen Vijay Mallya and Michiel Mol bought the Spyker F1 team for € 88 million. After going through 29 races without a point, Force India won their first Formula One World Championship points and podium place when Giancarlo Fisichella finished second in the 2009 Belgian Grand Prix. New Delhi hosted the Indian Grand Prix in 2011 at Buddh International Circuit in Greater Noida, 50 km from New Delhi. In the 2011 Formula One season, Karun Chandhok was the test driver for Team Lotus & Narain Karthikeyan was the test driver for HRT. Both Chandhok and Karthikeyan stepped in (for Jarno Trulli and Daniel Ricciardo, respectively) at the 2011 Indian Grand Prix; it was the first time two Indian drivers compete in the same Formula One Grand Prix.

In December 2013, Mahindra Racing joined the FIA Formula E Championship. For the first season in 2014–15, Karun Chandhok drove alongside Bruno Senna. Mahindra finished 8th in the Teams Championship. The Indian driver left the team after the first season, and was replaced by Nick Heidfeld.

On 17 January 2022, the city of Hyderabad signed a letter of intent with the FIA, making them a potential new E-Prix for the 2022-2023 Formula E season. On 11 February 2023, Hyderabad hosted its first ever Hyderabad E-Prix at Hyderabad Street Circuit. Jaguar FE Team's driver Mitch Evans took pole position but the win was taken by the DS Penske driver Jean-Éric Vergne. Motorcycle motorsports world championship MotoGP is also decided to make its debut in the country at the Buddh International Circuit, which hosted three Formula One Grand Prix's in the past as discussions have already been held between the Indian Motorsports Federation and the Fédération Internationale de Motocyclisme (FIM), for the Grand Prix of Bharat MotoGP in 2023. It is expected that India being the largest market for two-wheeler vehicles in the world, can hence be an attraction for International Motorcycle racing in the country and can gain a lot of public response and attention.

== Venues ==
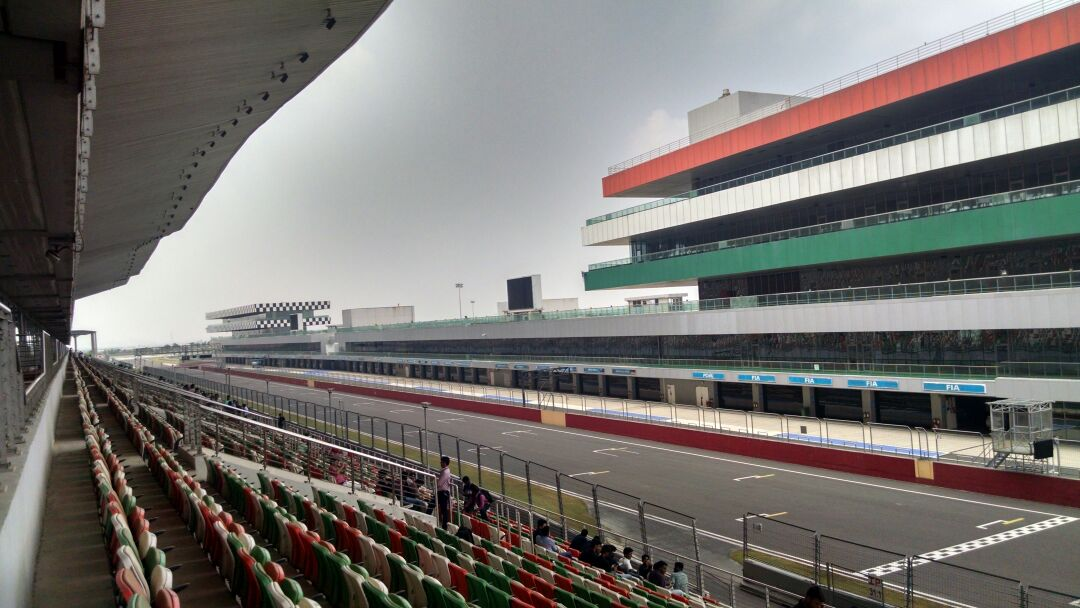
Buddh International Circuit in Jaypee Sports City, Noida

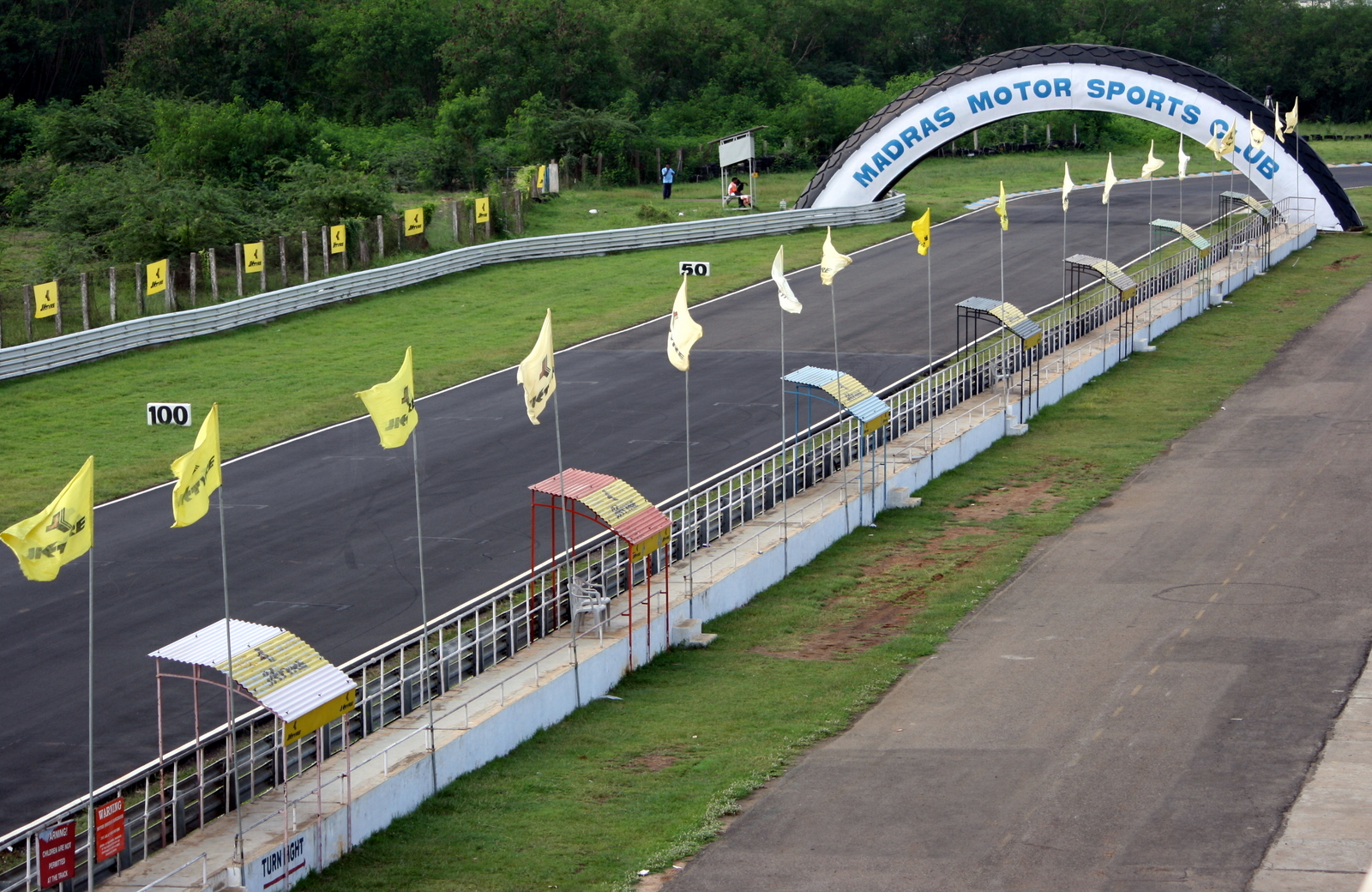
Madras International Circuit in Irungattukottai, Chennai

=== Permanent Circuits ===
- Buddh International Circuit, Noida
- Madras International Circuit, Chennai
- Kari Motor Speedway, Coimbatore
- CoASTT High Performance Centre, Coimbatore
- Bren Raceway, Bengaluru

=== Street Circuits ===
- Hyderabad Street Circuit, Hyderabad
- Chennai City Circuit, Chennai
- Goa Street Circuit, Goa
- Mumbai Street Circuit, Navi Mumbai

=== Defunct ===
- Cholavaram Airstrip, Chennai

=== List of National Sports award recipients in Motor Sports, showing the year, award, and gender ===
Year	Recipient	Award	Gender
2019	Gaurav Gill	Arjuna Award	Male

== See also ==
- Federation of Motor Sports Clubs of India
- Indian National Rally Championship
- JK Tyre National Racing Championship
- Madras International Circuit
- NATRAX (National Automotive Test Track), Indore
