= Automotive Industry Standard 140 =

Vehicle tracking standards (India)

Automotive Industry Standard 140, (AIS 140), is an AIS standard published by Automotive Research Association of India (ARAI). It followed an order issued by the Automotive Industry Standards Committee (AISC) of Ministry of Road Transport and Highways.

AIS 140 compliant devices use Global Positioning System, Indian Regional Navigation Satellite System and GSM/General Packet Radio Service modem for vehicle tracking. In addition it can have a provision for hybrid navigation constellations such as GLONASS and Galileo.

In January 2019, Indian government directed state governments to enforce AIS 140 compliant GPS tracking devices with the supporting software for all passenger-carrying buses and other public transport vehicles.

== ARAI-certified AIS-140 compliant device manufacturers ==
- KPIT Technologies
- Innspark

== See also ==
- Telematics
- Telematics 2.0
- Sydney Coordinated Adaptive Traffic System
- Freeway Traffic Management System
- Innspark Solutions
