= Electric road =

Road which supplies electric power to vehicles travelling on it

Three types of electric road systems. An electric truck (black) traveling along a road (gray) receives power: (A) with three inductive pickups (red) from a strip of resonant inductive coils (blue) under the road surface; (B) with a current collector (red) sliding over a ground-level power supply rail segment (blue) flush with the road surface; (C) with an overhead current collector (red) sliding against a powered overhead line (blue)

An electric road, eroad, e-roadway, or electric road system (ERS) is a road which supplies electric power to vehicles travelling on it. Common implementations are overhead power lines above the road, ground-level power supply through conductive rails, and dynamic wireless power transfer (DWPT) through resonant inductive coils or inductive cables embedded in the road.

Overhead power lines are limited to commercial vehicles while ground-level rails and inductive power transfer can be used by any vehicle, which allows for public charging through a system for power metering and billing. Research papers for the government of Sweden, published in 2019, and France, published in 2021, separately estimate that in-road conductive rail ERS is the most cost-effective.

As of 2024 there were about 10 operational ERS demonstrators around the world, and their business models and deployment strategies are being evaluated. As of 2025 electric road technical standards are only available for in-road rail of the three ERS technologies.

Other than describing electric road systems, terms like "electric highway" may also describe regular roads fitted with charging stations at regular intervals.

== Technology ==
TRL (formerly Transport Research Laboratory), in a late 2010s overview of the subject, listed three power delivery types for dynamic charging, or charging while the vehicle is in motion: overhead power lines, ground level power through rails, and induction through rails or resonant coils. The TRL overview lists overhead power as the most technologically mature solution which provides the highest levels of power, but the technology is unsuitable for non-commercial vehicles. Ground-level power is suitable for all vehicles, with rail being a mature solution with high transfer of power and easily accessible and inspected elements. Inductive charging delivers the least power and requires more electrical roadside equipment than the alternatives.

The electric road studies by the French government published in 2021 similarly found in-road rail as the most suitable and cost-effective solution. One of the studies ruled out overhead lines due to safety concerns, and another ruled out inductive charging as it didn't meet France's 250 kW minimum average power requirement.

=== Safety ===
Overhead line ERS were assessed in 2024 by the German Ministry of Economy, BMWK, as a safety risks for emergency services, and the lines' roadside poles were assessed as a collision risk for motorists.

Wireless ERS were noted by SAE International as not having have well-established foreign object detection technologies as of 2023. SAE proposed establishing safety tests for these technologies, as foreign objects pose a fire or burn risk if metals or organisms are between the ground pad and the receiver when the system is active. Wireless inductive ERS is being tested by France in 2026 for compliance with regulatory allowable electromagnetic noise levels.

Rail ERS have been tested for compatibility with snow plows and for safety under exposure to snow, ice, salting, and saturated brine. The infrastructure's robustness and safety have been validated in road tests that took place in 2024 and 2025 in France. Safety was validated in case of failure of the electrical system, failure of the contact arm in the deployed position, collision of debris with the contact arm, stopped vehicle on the ERS lane, tailgating on the ERS lane, and other safety issues.

=== Wireless ERS effects on roads ===
A study published in 2017 found increased formation of reflective cracks for roads with in-road inductive coils.

INDOT began studying the road installation of a dynamic wireless power transfer (DWPT) system in 2024 with special polymer-concrete previously used for bridges.

The French government study of electric roads, which began in 2023, included structural performance tests. In-road inductive charging infrastructure was found to cause excessive strain for road surfaces using standard road materials. The study recommended using more robust materials, which were shown to reduce strains to a satisfactory level. The study found increased risk of thermal damage to the road due to the induction coils exceeding temperatures of 100 °C (212 °F). The 2023 tests showed risk of debonding between the inductive coils casing and the top layer of the road. ÉTS and Université Laval studied the structural performance of in-pavement inductive coils in 2025, similarly finding evidence of debonding. The wireless ERS trial in France along a kilometer on the A10 autoroute used asphalt reinforced with woven fiberglass to meet the road's mechanical requirements and limit premature occurrence of reflective cracks.

=== Standardization ===
Governments and research institutes in the early 2020s recommended standardizing ERS technologies before choosing one specific technology. A report by the Research Institutes of Sweden (RISE) recommends inter-city infrastructure capable of 300 kW or more for best cost-effectiveness. The Swedish National Road and Transport Research Institute (VTI) similarly recommends a system capable of delivering 300 kW per truck. The French Ministry of Ecology working group recommends 400 kW for 44-ton trucks driving at 90 kilometers per hour along a 2% grade, or at minimum 250 kW so the truck can charge along flat or gently-sloping roads. The European Commission published in 2021 a request for regulation and standardization of electric road systems.

==== Ground-level rail electric roads ====
Test benches for ground-level power supply current collectors and friction pads

A standard for electrical equipment on board a vehicle powered by ground level rail electric road system (ERS), CENELEC Technical Standard 50717, has been approved and published in 2022. A complete ground-level power supply system standard, CENELEC technical standard 50740, was drafted in accordance with European Union directive 2023/1804. The standard has been approved and published in 2025.

The rails and friction pads for heavy truck current collectors have been tested at the Gustave Eiffel University for 50,000 km (31,000 miles) at 90 km/h (56 mph). The rails were found to have worn down 0.1 mm (0.004 inches), and the different types of friction pads were found to have a service life of 10,000–20,000 km (6,200–12,400 miles).

==== Wireless electric roads ====
Standards for inductive charging for vehicles have been available since 2020, though they are not immediately suited for electric roads. For instance, the CEO of IPT, a vehicle inductive power transfer company, regards the existing standards as "extremely expensive" for use in electric roads. Cost-effective implementations are being explored by IPT using its Primove inductive cables technology which it bought in 2021 from Bombardier. WiPowerOne (an offshoot of the KAIST OLEV project) and Electreon, two wireless electric road companies, have been working on new dynamic inductive charging standards since 2021. ENRX, which is composed of several companies including IPT, announced in November 2024 that it plans to collaborate with InductEV to standardize dynamic wireless power transfer.

SAE International has started developing standards for dynamic wireless power transfer in 2023. An Electreon representative stated in a podcast published in December 2023 that SAE, Electreon, and other organizations are jointly developing a standard for dynamic wireless inductive charging.

== Business model ==
A 2020 Swedish Transport Administration electric road program report anticipated that a national electric road network would require interfaces between several players: the electricity supplier, the power grid company, the vehicle manufacturer, the road owner, the electric road technology operator, the metering and billing provider, and the user of the electric road. The ownership model can vary: the power grid company may own the secondary roadside electrical substations that power the electric road infrastructure or they may be owned by other players, and the power reading and payment system may be owned by a player separate from the infrastructure operator. Annual maintenance costs are estimated to be 0.5% of capital costs for rail ERS, 1% for wireless, and 1%-2% for overhead lines.

=== Rail charging for freight ===
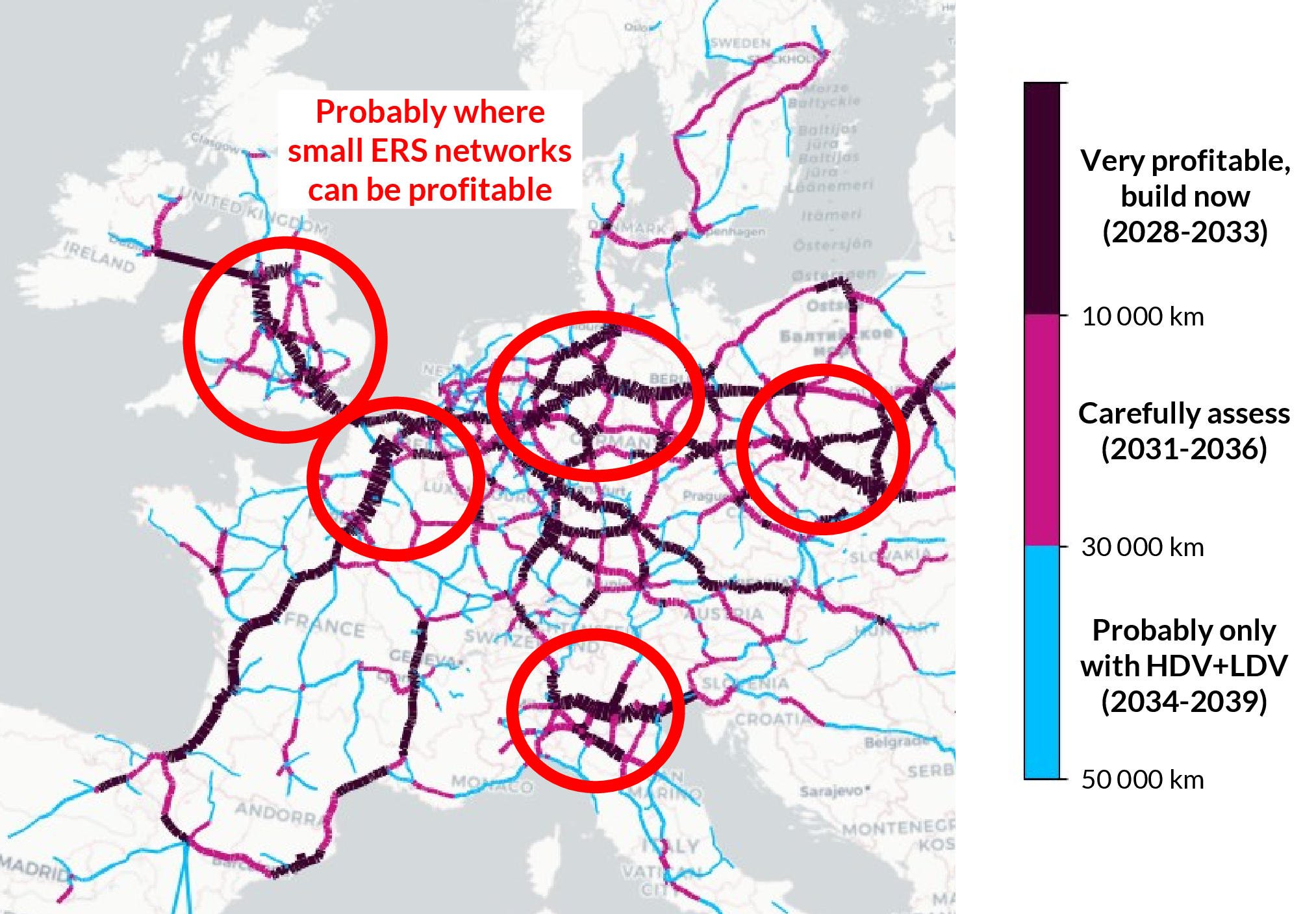
The red circles outline local electric road networks that are highly likely to be profitable for road operators and heavy-duty vehicle (HDV) freight operators.

The right chart estimates the charging infrastructure cost of German freight truck fleet electrification. While ERS infrastructure has a higher upfront cost than charging stations, it provides charging for a lower cost once utilization is sufficiently high. An electric road network with charging stations (solid yellow line) requires less expenditure than charging stations only (solid blue line) when charging over 120 thousand trucks along German roads.

A 2026 review of electric road systems (ERS) by participants in the ERS trials for the French government reported that ERS operators could promote ERS usage with its low cost to users. Operators can purchase energy at around €0.09/kWh and sell it to ERS users at around €0.19/kWh, a lower cost than the average rate for home charging in France. At these rates, the gross profit margin would be over 50%. Return on investment would be 4% annually over 32 years due to upfront costs of infrastructure, and maintenance and operating costs. Contemporary toll roads in France charge significantly more per kilometer driven than what ERS charging per kilometer would cost at 50% gross margin, allowing toll road operators to implement ERS, which would, along with the lower electricity cost, incentivize toll road users to install ERS chargers on their vehicles. Energy savings increase with the weight of the vehicle; large diesel truck operators that would switch to battery-electric ERS trucks would recoup over 93% of the toll road charge in fuel cost savings along the toll road. These factors financially allow the implementation of ERS through the French toll highway concession model. Countries without a concession model could use public–private partnerships for the same end.

A model developed for eRoadMontBlanc, one of the ERS trial projects in France, estimates that to meet charging demand a 44 tonne truck on the A6 autoroute, ERS would be required to be deployed on 94% of the road if it charges at 300 kW, 52% at 400 kW, or 41% at 500 kW, which is the maximum power that the ERS is currently able to provide.

=== Wireless charging for bus rapid transit ===
A study conducted in Michigan that was published in 2026 about wireless inductive electric road systems found, using data from BRTdata.org for the year 2025, that a wireless charging lane would not be cost-effective for most bus rapid transit (BRT) systems around the world, with the exception of the ones in Beijing, Xiamen, and Bogotá. Cost-effectiveness requires a combination of high fleet utilization and high traffic density: utilization is given by the ratio of traveling buses to the total available bus fleet, and density is given by the number of traveling buses per mile of bus lane. The study assumes a wireless power transfer efficiency of 90%, installation of the minimal length of wireless charging infrastructure required to meet fleet charging needs, and a fixed cost of $3M per wireless charging infrastructure mile and an additional cost of $10k per kW-mile. This gives, for example, a cost of $4M per mile for a 100 kW wireless charging system, where the 100 kW system is more expensive per mile than a 50 kW or 25 kW system, but requires less miles of charging lanes.

== Early implementations ==
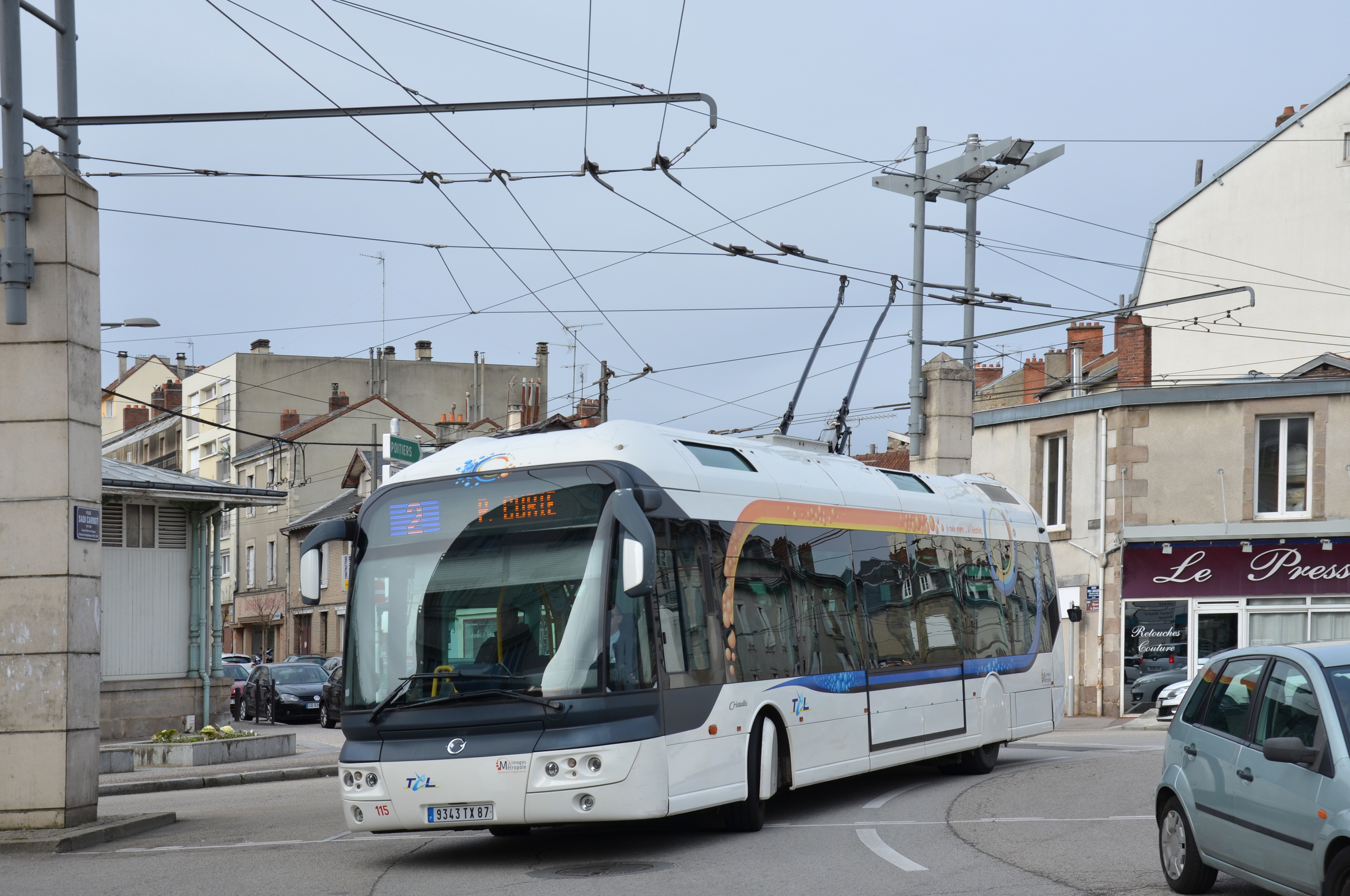
Irisbus Cristalis trolleybus using overhead power lines in Limoges, France, 2015

Overhead power lines have been used for road transport since at least 1882 in Berlin with Werner von Siemens's trolley buses. Over 300 trolley bus systems were in operation in 2018. Power to trolley buses is normally delivered using a pair of trolley poles positioned on top of the vehicle which extends to the overhead power lines. Implementations for highway vehicles have been developed in the late 2000s and 2010s but they are not suitable for non-commercial vehicles such as passenger cars.

Ground-level power supply in the form of electrified rails is similar to overhead power lines in implementation. Instead of an arm or pole extending to overhead power lines, a mechanical arm extends from the bottom of the vehicle and aligns with a rail embedded in the road. The rail is then powered, and power is transferred through the arm to the vehicle. Ground-level power supply is considered aesthetically preferable to overhead wires and it is suited for all types of vehicles.

The concept of a wireless ground-level power supply for vehicles was first patented in 1894. A static-charging system for shuttle buses was demonstrated in New Zealand in 1996 using inductive coils. Similar stationary charging systems for buses and other vehicles have been implemented by Conductix-Wampfler and Bombardier Primove. Primove was further enhanced to include dynamic charging while driving using inductive cables.

Development of electric road systems has matured significantly from the late 1990s through the 2010s. Several companies have developed and implemented electric road systems in the 2010s.

== National network projects ==
Government studies and trials have been conducted in several countries seeking a national electric road network:

- Korea was the first to implement an induction-based public electric road with a commercial bus line in 2013 after testing an experimental shuttle service in 2009. The first road and three subsequent electric road trials were shut down due to aging infrastructure amidst controversy over the continued public funding of the technology.
- United Kingdom municipal research projects in 2015 and 2021 found wireless electric roads financially unfeasible.
- Sweden started assessing various electric road technologies in 2013 under the Swedish Transport Administration electric road program. After receiving electric road construction offers in excess of the program's budget in 2023, Sweden pursued cost-reduction measures for either wireless or rail electric roads. The project's final report was published in 2024. It recommends against funding a national electric road network in Sweden as it would not be cost-effective, unless the technology was first adopted by its trading partners such as France and Germany.
- Germany published findings in 2023 on the wireless electric road system (wERS) by Electreon. The system's receivers collect 64.3% of the power output of its transmitters, and it poses many difficulties during installation and blocks access to other infrastructure in the road. Germany trialed overhead lines in three projects in the 2010s and 2020s, and reported they are too expensive, difficult to maintain, and pose a safety risk.
- France found the same drawbacks for overhead lines as Germany, and began testing inductive and rail electric road systems in 2023. Testing of the inductive system is scheduled to conclude in September 2026.
- India announced plans in 2023 for a national electric road network, beginning with a road between Sohna and Jaipur. NATRAX proposed in 2025 to assess different ERS technologies along a test track so they can give the government access to granular data about the technologies.

=== Korea ===
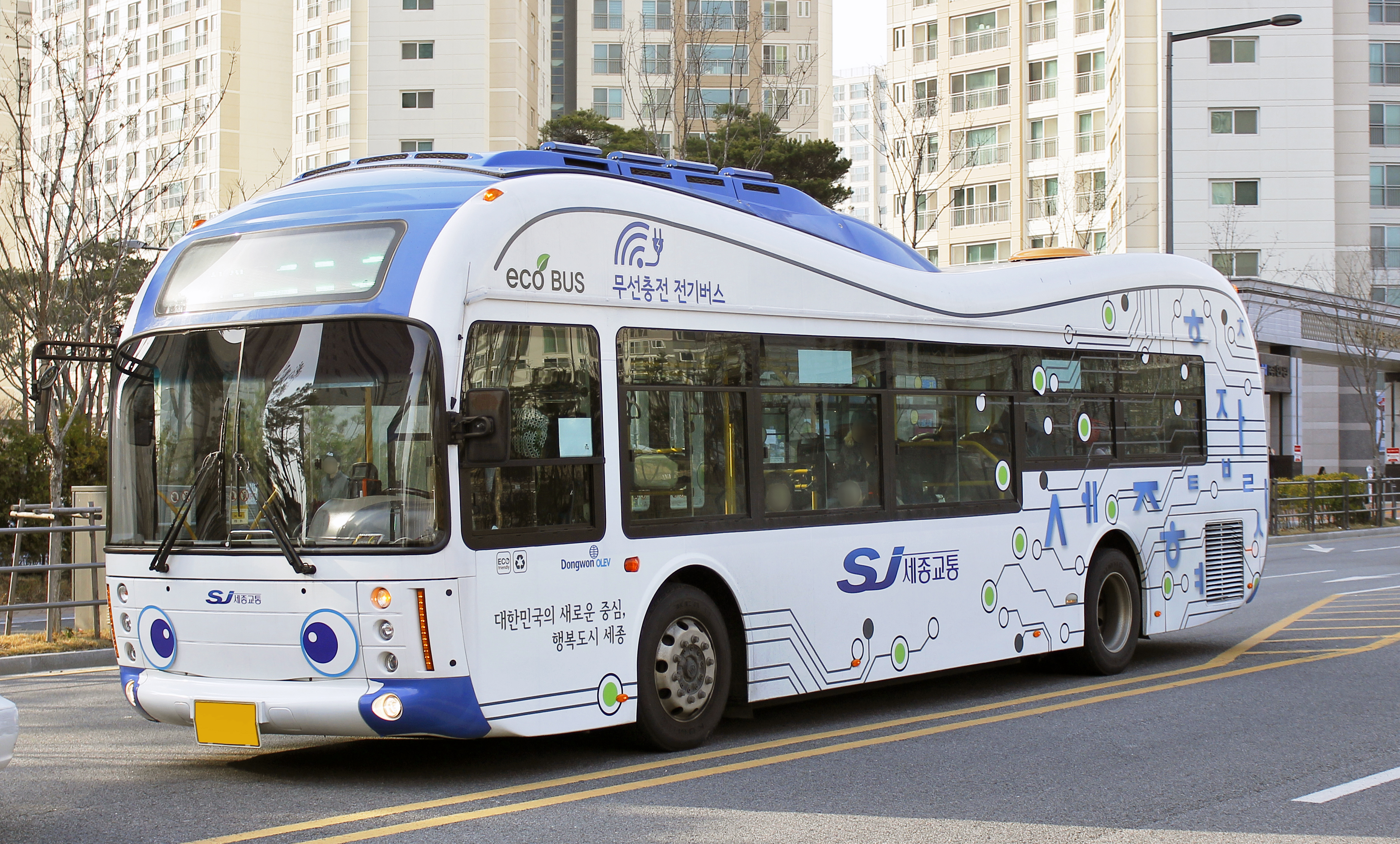
OLEV bus using ground-level wireless dynamic charging, 2016

The Korea Advanced Institute of Science and Technology launched in 2009 a shuttle service with wireless dynamic charging through inductive coils embedded in the road. In 2013 OLEV launched a bus line in the city of Gumi. Another bus line was launched in Sejong in 2015, and two more bus lines were added in Gumi in 2016. All four wireless charging bus lines were shut down due to aging infrastructure. A new bus line was inaugurated in 2019 in Yuseong District. Commercialization of the technology has not been successful, leading to controversy over the continued public funding of the technology in 2019.

=== Sweden ===
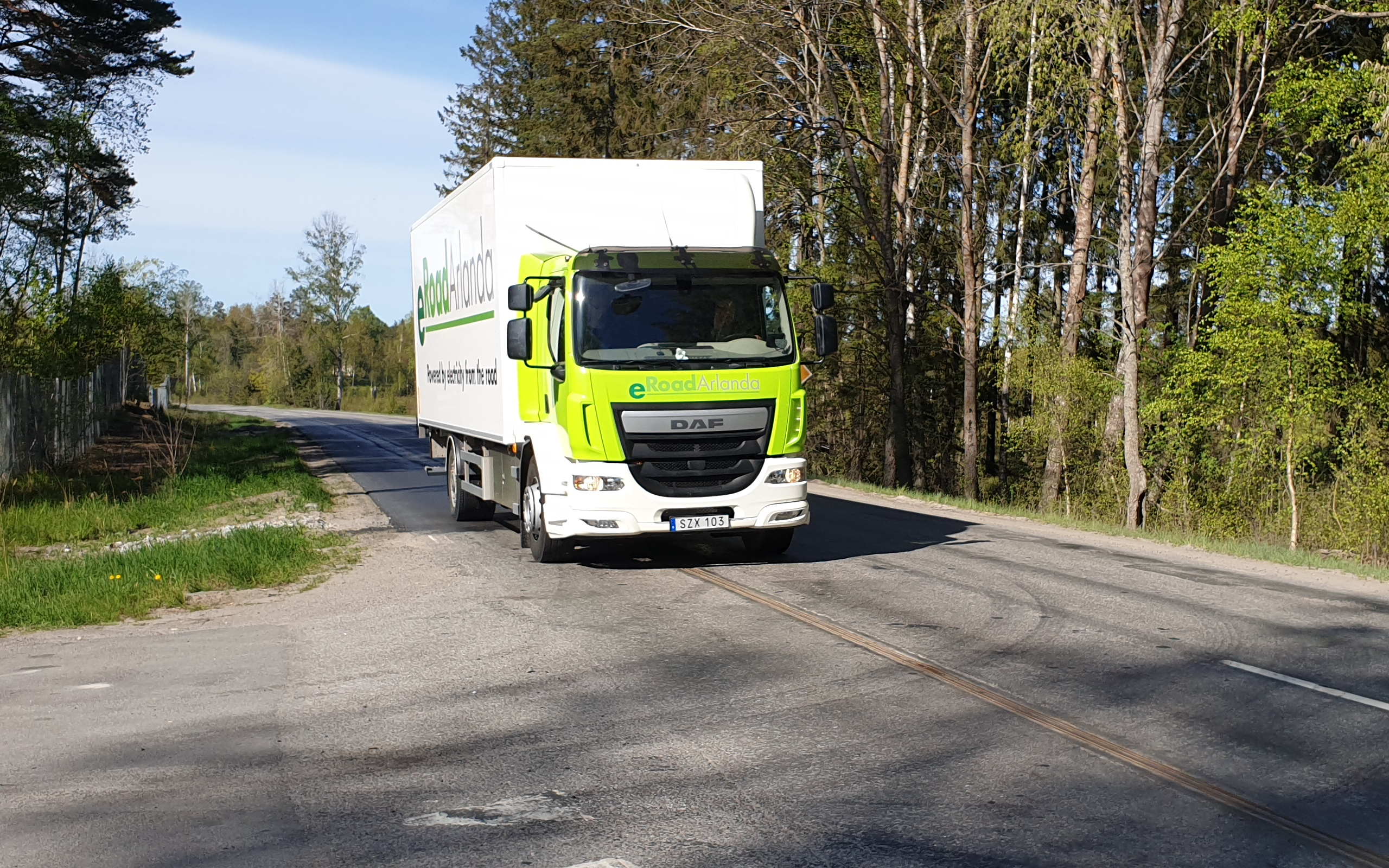
Electric truck driving on a public road with Elways ground-level power supply, near Arlanda airport, 2019.

The Swedish Transport Administration, Trafikverket, established an electric road program that studied the feasibility of an electric road national infrastructure for Sweden. The fact-finding program began in 2012 and assessments of various electric road technologies in Sweden began in 2013. Trafikverket was expected to announce its chosen technology for electric roads by late 2023, but due to procurement offers for the first permanent electric road on the E20 highway exceeding the project's budget, in 2023 Trafikverket began investigating cost-reducing measures in order to realize the project within its budget. The project's final report was published in 2024, which recommended against funding a national electric road network in Sweden as it would not be cost-effective, unless the technology was adopted by trading partners such as France and Germany.

The final report by CollERS, the Swedish-German research collaboration on electric road systems, advised Trafikverket to select a single ERS technology, suitable for heavy trucks, with several suppliers who use an existing standard, coordinated with German and French ERS decisions, not necessarily led by the European Union but with their coordination, utilizing an ERS-technology-neutral payment system.

=== United Kingdom ===
Highways England began a dynamic wireless power transfer project in 2015, and a procurement process for trials replicating motorway conditions was underway, but the project was cancelled in early 2016 for budgetary reasons. Another dynamic wireless power transfer feasibility study, dubbed DynaCoV, began in 2021 and issued its final report in 2022. The study found that dynamic wireless charging is 3 to 10 times more expensive than conductive charging and is not financially feasible. Proposed costs for 200 metres (220 yd) including vehicle integration costs for one bus and one van were £1.475 million. Vehicle integration costs alone were £129,500, excluding decommissioning. The company that participated in the study, Electreon, intended to pave a demonstration wireless charging road in Coventry in 2024.

=== Germany ===
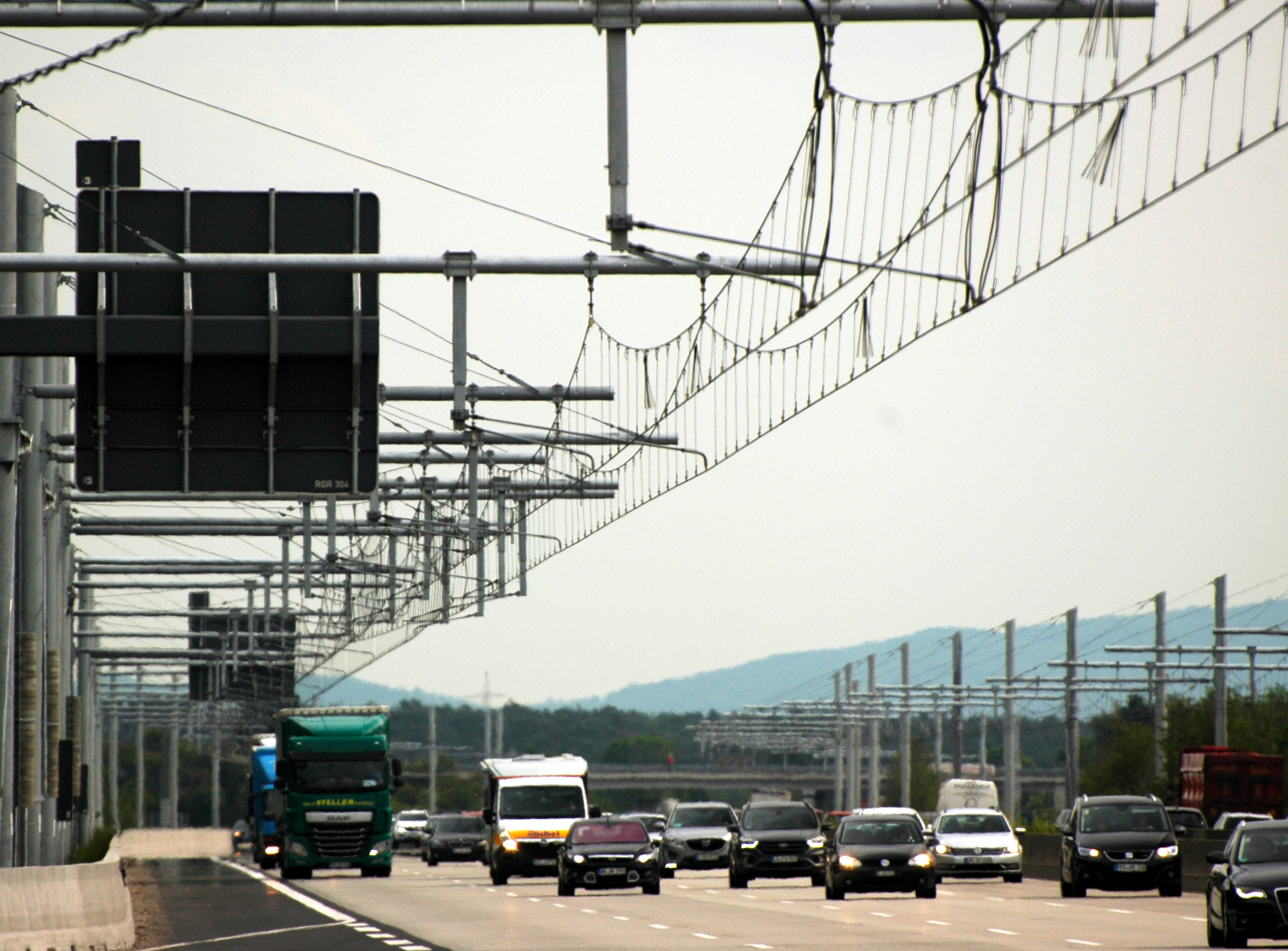
Siemens eHighway overhead power lines on Bundesautobahn 5 in Germany

The German Ministry of Economy, BMWK, assessed overhead line systems for trucks. The project was titled "e-Highway", opening the first stretch of electric highway in 2016. The project grew into three public highway trials: FESH, ELISA, and eWayBW. One of the trials was launched in May 2019 on a 10 km (6.2 mi) section of Bundesautobahn 5 south of Frankfurt, operated by the ELISA consortium which includes Siemens and Scania. Results were mixed. By the end if the trial period the system was functioning satisfactorily, and operators using the technology enjoyed lower freight costs. Despite this, the Ministry encountered high costs and difficult maintenance. The Ministry found overhead power lines pose safety risks for emergency services, and the lines' roadside poles pose a collision risk for motorists. Subsequently, the Ministry ended its financial support of the trials.

Wireless electric road system (wERS) trials were conducted in 2023 by the German Ministry of Economy, BMWK, with infrastructure by Electreon. A bus was equipped with inductive coils that receive power from a 200-meter strip of transmitters under the road surface. The receivers were able to collect 64.3% of the energy emitted from the transmitters. Installation proved complex and costly, and finding suitable locations for the coils' roadside power cabinets proved difficult. The wERS infrastructure blocked access to all civil infrastructure beneath it. Internet access outages caused the wERS infrastructure to stop functioning entirely.

=== France ===
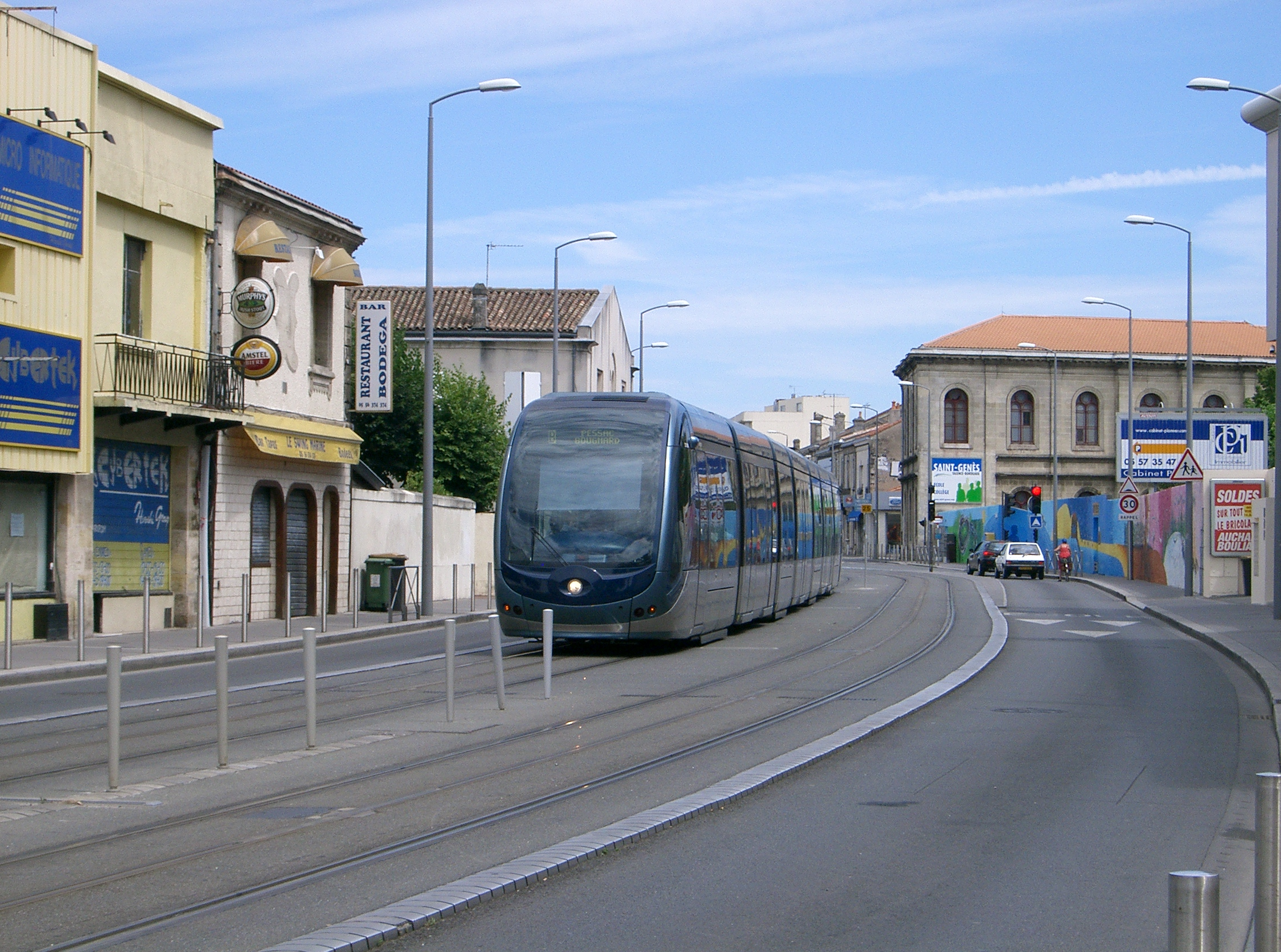
Bordeaux tramway with Alstom ground-level power supply, a technology that as of 2022 is being considered for electric roads.

France plans to invest 30 to 40 billion euro by 2035 in an electric road system spanning 8,800 kilometers that recharges electric cars, buses and trucks while driving. Two projects for assessment of electric road technologies were announced in 2023. Three technologies were originally considered: ground-level power supply, inductive charging, and overhead lines. Ground-level power supply technologies, provided by Alstom, Elonroad, and others, are considered the most likely candidate for electric roads. Inductive charging is not considered a mature technology as it delivers the least power, loses 20%-25% of the supplied power when installed on trucks, and its health effects have yet to be documented. Overhead lines is the most mature technology, but the catenaries and overhead wires pose safety and maintenance issues, and motorway companies find overhead lines too expensive.

==== Trials ====
Alstom has developed a ground-level power supply (alimentation par le sol - APS) system for use with buses and other vehicles. The system has been tested for compatibility with snow plows and for safety under exposure to snow, ice, salting, and saturated brine. Alstom will trial its electric road system (ERS) on the public road RN205 in the Rhône-Alpes region in 2027. The system is expected to supply 500 kW of power for electric heavy trucks, as well as power for road utility vehicles and electric cars. The infrastructure's robustness and safety have been validated in road tests that took place in 2024 and 2025. Safety was validated in case of failure of the electrical system, failure of the contact arm in the deployed position, collision of debris with the contact arm, stopped vehicle on the ERS lane, tailgating on the ERS lane, and other safety issues.

Vinci will test two electric road systems (ERS) from 2023 to 2027. Both technologies will initially be tested in laboratory conditions, and upon meeting the test requirements they will be installed along 2 kilometers each on the A10 autoroute south of Paris. Wireless ERS by Electreon will be tested for durability under highway traffic, and will attempt to reach 200 kW of power delivery per truck using multiple receivers. Rail ERS by Elonroad, which supplies 350 kW of power per receiver, will be tested for skid effects on motorcycles. Both systems will be interoperable with cars, buses, and trucks. Vinci Autoroutes installed 750 meters of the induction system by February 2025, which is expected to be tested from April until December using four different vehicles. The rail system is expected to begin undergoing testing in September 2025. Testing of the inductive system is scheduled to conclude in September 2026.

=== India ===
India announced plans for a 6,000-km electric highway network in January 2024. The first part of the network is planned to be deployed between Sohna and Jaipur for use by electric buses. Initially the use of overhead lines was mentioned, and in October 2024 the India government's National Highway for EV body (NHEV) was considering ground-level power supply technology for the project. NATRAX proposed in 2025 to assess different ERS technologies along a test track so they can give the government access to granular data about the technologies.

== Local projects ==
Many local electric road projects were conducted in small-scale installations of several hundred meters around the world. Among them: Bombardier, dynamic wireless power transfer (DWPT), Germany, 2013; Alstom, ground-level power supply (GLPS), Sweden, 2014; Honda, GLPS, Japan, 2018; Qualcomm, DWPT, Italy and France, 2018; Elonroad, GLPS, United States, Canada, and Europe, 2010s-2020s; Electreon, DWPT, worldwide, 2010s-2020s; ENRX, DWPT, Europe and the United States, 2010s-2020s; and others. Honda plans holding a trial for a 150 kW DWPT public road in Japan in 2027. Several of these technologies have been studied further in national ERS projects. As of 2024 there were about 10 operational ERS demonstrators around the world, and their business cases and deployment strategies are being evaluated.

=== Canada ===
Quebec companies Transport Morneau and Filgo plan to use a ground-level power supply system by Elonroad for charging Volvo and Tyco electric heavy equipment and trucks while they park or drive. Vehicles by six or seven manufacturers are planned to take part in the trial, which was announced in 2025. The infrastructure will be tested for reliability, wear, resistance to contaminants, and profitability.

=== China ===
Zhongtong Electrified Highway Technology (中同电气化公路技术) planned in 2024 to construct 500 kilometers of electric road for the continuous 24-hour-a-day operation of coal-mining trucks in Xinjiang completely powered by overhead wires.

=== Norway ===
AtB and the municipality of Trondheim have tested dynamic inductive charging in 2024 and 2025. Buses were outfitted with inductive coils capable of receiving 120 kW of power. While driving at 30 km/h (19 mph) over an 80-meter strip of transmitter coils embedded in the road, the coils on the bus received on average about 65 kW.

=== United States ===
==== ASPIRE ====
ASPIRE is a research and advocacy center in the US for electric transportation focusing on wireless power transfer. The center is headed by Utah State University professor Regan Zane, the founding director of ASPIRE. Zane had formerly headed the industry-sponsored center SELECT, which demonstrated its first inductive charging road in 2015. SELECT grew into ASPIRE in 2020. The National Science Foundation (NSF) awarded ASPIRE $26.7 million in funding between 2020 and 2024. The center participates in several wireless electric road demonstration projects alongside its industry sponsors. ASPIRE intends to "serve as an expert guide for state legislatures" in matters of transportation electrification and as of 2023 it is pursuing a further $160 million grant from the NSF. The ASPIRE research center launched the ASPIRE Foundation in 2026 in an effort to promote the deployment and adoption of the technologies researched by ASPIRE members.

==== Projects ====
ENRX (formerly IPT) won a contract in 2023 to build a one-mile inductive cable wireless charging system capable of charging at up to 200 kW on State Road 516 near Orlando, Florida. The project is funded at 13 million dollars.

Detroit, Michigan opened in November 2023 a quarter-mile wireless charging road section near Michigan Central Station. The project was funded at 5.9 million dollars. The infrastructure, provided by Electreon, powered a van driving at 9 mph with 16 kW of power. The Michigan Department of Transportation (MDOT) has tested the technology from 2023 to 2025. MDOT looked into the power losses from the grid to the wireless receiver, the optimal charging speed, the effects of misalignment of the coils when the charging vehicle is driving along the road, and the effects on the asphalt above the coils. The Michigan ERS study concluded a wireless charging bus rapid transit lane would not be cost-effective.

Indiana began constructing a strip of electrified highway in 2024 that uses inductive coil charging at 200 kW, suitable for heavy trucks. The project costs 11 million dollars per quarter mile of road. Research on the project, conducted by Purdue University's Steve Pekarek, aims to show the technology could make a transition to heavy electric trucks more financially beneficial for businesses. The cost of a single wireless electric lane at 50% coverage at large-scale deployment was estimated in 2021 to be about 6.5 million dollars per mile.

Long Beach Port will begin using in late 2025 a ground-level power supply electric road designed by Elonroad, a Swedish electric road company. The project, funded at US$4.5 million by the California Energy Commission, will study the technology's weather endurance for 12 months, and will feature a road that supplies 250 kW of power to electric vehicles driving over it, and five automatic 50 kW charging stations.

== See also ==
- Battery electric bus
- Electric bus
- In-motion charging electric bus
