= GARC - Chennai =

Test center in Oragadam, Tamil Nadu

Global Automotive Research Centre (GARC) is a unit under the Indian National Automotive Testing and R&D Infrastructure Project (NATRiP) housing the facilities for comprehensive testing services. GARC provides certification testing and R&D support to automotive vehicle and component manufacturers. The GARC is spread over 304 acres with combined office space and test labs at the SIPCOT Industrial Growth Centre near Chennai at Oragadam. The center has certification test facilities to conduct the performance testing of the full range of automobiles. The center has a center of excellence for Passive Safety, EMC and Automotive Infotronics.

== Facilities ==
The following facilities are planned at GARC:

- Infotronics Lab (Center of Excellence)
- Passive Safety Lab (Center of Excellence)
- EMC Lab (Center of Excellence)
- Powertrain Lab
- Fatigue Lab
- Certification Lab
- Material Lab
- Component Lab
- Homologation Tracks

== Vehicle types ==
- Four-wheeler manufacturers
- Commercial vehicle manufacturers
- Three-wheeler manufacturers
- Two-wheeler manufacturers
- Construction equipment vehicle manufacturers
- Agricultural equipment manufacturers
- E-rickshaw manufacturers
- Bus body manufacturers
- CNG-LPG kit retrofitters
- Automotive & non-automotive engine manufacturers
- DG set manufacturers
- Automotive component manufacturers

== See also ==
- Tata Motors
