= NATRiP =

National Automotive Testing and R&D Infrastructure Project (NATRiP)
- Company type: Government
- Headquarters: New Delhi, Delhi, India
- Key people: Ms. Neeti Sarkar IRAS, CEO & PD .
- Products: Homologation
- Services: Homologation and Automotive R&D
- Website: Official Website

National Automotive Testing and R&D Infrastructure Project (NATRiP), the largest and one of the most significant initiatives in automotive sector so far, represents a unique joining of hands between the Government of India, a number of state governments and Indian Automotive Industry to create a state of the art Testing, Validation and R&D infrastructure in the country.

The Project aims at creating core global competencies in Automotive sector in India and facilitate seamless integration of Indian Automotive industry with the world as also to position the country prominently on the global automotive map. NATRiP aim to create a testing, validation and R&D infrastructure, had announced to invest Rs 1,718 crore for setting up of seven auto testing facilities at seven locations across India by 2011. NATRIP is forging ahead at a fast pace on schedule. Currently, tenders worth more than Rs 1642.97 Cr have been floated and tenders worth around Rs 1403.98 crore have been finalized The Cabinet Committee on Economic Affairs in their meeting held on 27 July 2016 has approved the revised time lines and escalation of cost estimate of the project. Accordingly, now the revised cost estimates is Rs. 3727.30 crore with project completion date in June 2019.

== List of Test Centres ==
The facilities under NATRiP at Manesar, Chennai, VRDE Ahmednagar, ARAI Pune, Rae Bareilly, Silchar and Indore will provide comprehensive homologation and product testing and validation facilities for vehicles and components and will also foster global competencies for generic research and development geared to catapult India into the league of nations with automotive excellence. Centres being established under this project are:

Sr. No.	Name of Centre
1	ICAT - Manesar
2	GARC - Chennai
3	NATRAX - Khandwa
4	ARAI - Pune
5	NCAT - Ahmednagar
6	NCVRS/ADAC - Rae Bareli
7	East Centre - Silchar

=== Region-wise Centres ===
As part of NATRIP, the following test centres have been finalised to set up the test facilities as described below:

West centre
A full fledged testing and homologation facilities at ARAI, Pune and VRDE, Ahmednagar.

South Centre
Chennai (Tamil Nadu) – A full fledged testing and homologation centre.

North Centre
Manesar (Haryana) - A full-fledged testing and homologation centre within the northern hub of automotive industry.

World-class proving grounds
Testing tracks on approx 3000 acres of land at district Khandwa, in Madhya Pradesh, Having different types of world class testing tracks and India's biggest proving ground along with the electric vehicles battery testing facility and vehicle testing facility.

National Centre for Vehicle Research & Safety(NCVRS) and Accident Data Analysis Centre(ADAC)
Centre for Testing & Homologation of Tractors, Agricultural Vehicles and Off-Road Vehicles together with accident data analysis and specialized driving training centre at Rae Bareli in Uttar Pradesh.

In-use vehicle Management centre
National Specialized Hill Area Driving Training Centre at Dholchora (Silchar) Assam,
Inspection and Maintenance Station for in use vehicles and Mechanics Institute at Jaffirband (Silchar) Assam.
