= Central Institute of Road Transport =

Research center in Maharashtra, India

- Other names: CIRT
- Type: Registered Society
- Established: 1967
- Administrative staff: 240
- Location: Bhosari, Pune, Maharashtra, India; 18°36′57″N 73°49′25″E
- Website: CIRT

The Central Institute of Road Transport (CIRT) is a Government of India undertaking, established under the then Ministry of Shipping and Transport and the Association of State Road Transport Undertakings (ASTRU). It is a nodal agency, known to be only one of its kind, providing a platform for higher research and training on road transportation and assists in testing, guidance and consultancy in the field.

== Profile ==
The Central Institute of Road Transport (CIRT) is a Government of India undertaking, established in 1967, with an aim to improve the public transport system in India by developing efficient management systems through research and by providing testing and consultancy activities in the field of road transportation. The institute is located on the Pune-Nasik Highway in Pune in the state of Maharashtra, India. The institute works under the Association of State Road Transport Undertakings (ASTRU), which controls the State Road Transport Corporations.

The Institute makes services available to public and private sectors and undertakes projects and provides testing facilities through its various laboratories. CIRT is an accredited National Accreditation Board for Testing and Calibration Laboratories (NABL) laboratory and is a Government of India approved centre for vehicle and spare parts certification. A Governing Council consisting of government officials and State Transport representatives oversees the institute's activities under the Vice President of ASRTU, who acts as the ex-officio chairman.

CIRT ISO 9001 and ISO 14001 Certified by TÜV Süddeutschland of Munich, Germany and holds memberships with the Association of Indian Management Schools (AIMS) and the Association of Management Development Institutions in South Asia (AMDISA).

== Mandate ==
The institute is formed with a specified set of mandate

- To introduce modern organizational management principles and practices in the area of public transportation
- To provide a platform for higher research on transport development
- To provide consultancy services for the improvement of organizational and operational efficiency
- To provide training to transport professionals across the country on public transportation
- To assist Government and its agencies for evolving policies and legislation in road transport sector
- To prepare and prescribe standards, specifications and norms of vehicles and spare parts through quality evaluation and monitoring
- To act as the central agency for dissemination of information and technology with special emphasis on safety, environment and productivity
- To undertake research on quality upgradation of transport systems

== Laboratory facilities ==
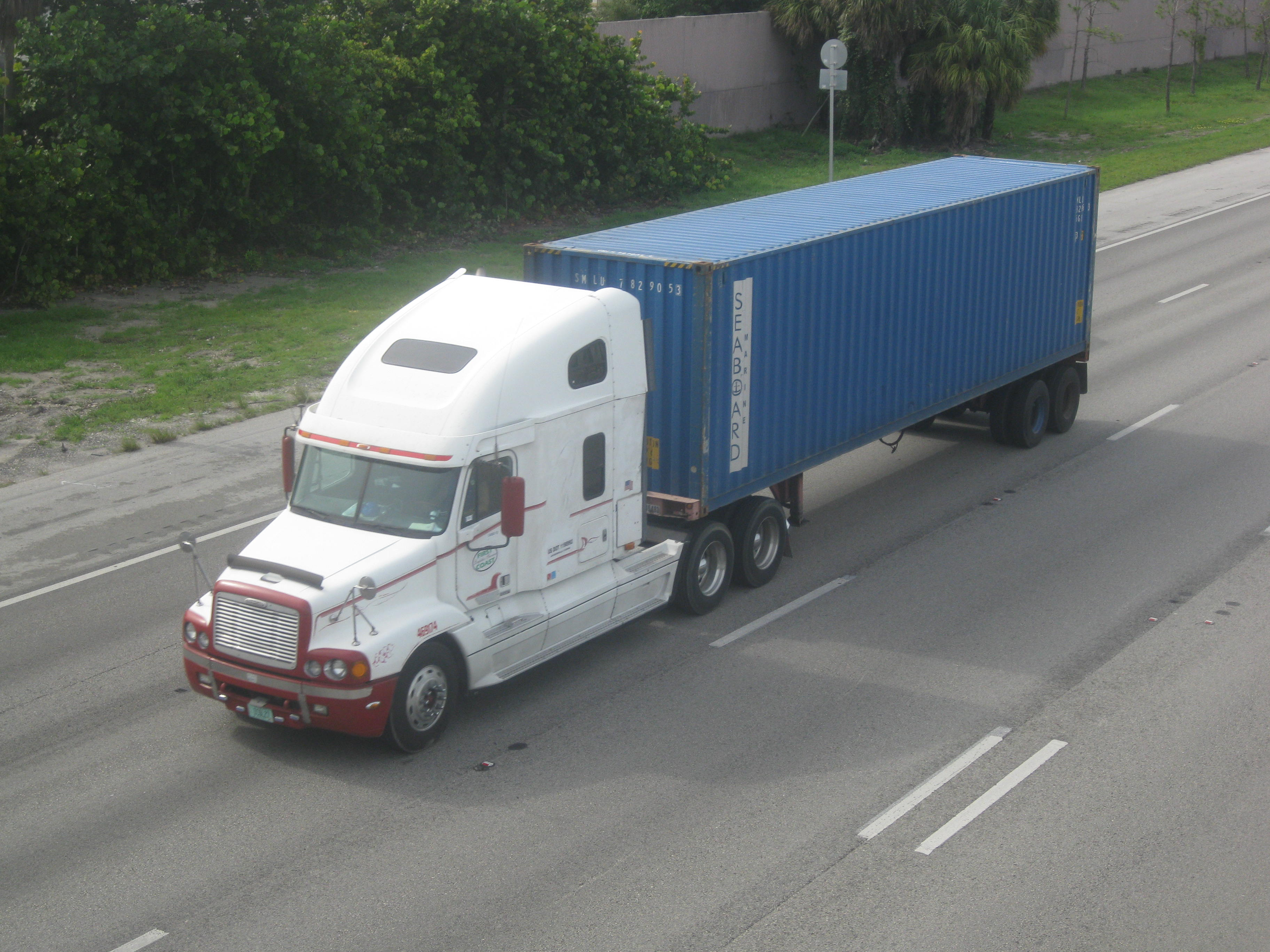
A truck transporting a container on Interstate 95 in South Florida.

CIRT is equipped with modern equipment under its various laboratories.

Auto Lab 1	Auto Lab 2
Fire Resistance Test Rig for Plastic Fuel Tank	Height Gauge
Fuel Permeability Test Chamber	Profile Projector
Heating Chamber	Roundness Tester
Lubricating Oil Filter Test Rig	Surface Roughness Tester
Oil Seal Test Rig	
Pendulum Impact Tester For Plastic Fuel Tank	

Chemical Lab	Electrical Lab	Environment Lab
Atomic Absorption Spectrometer	Battery Test System	Horizontal Flammability Chamber
Direct Reading Spectrometer	Climate Chamber	Humidity Chamber
Electrochemical Analyser	Cold Chamber	PVC Flexing Machine
ELTRA CS-2000 Carbon Sulphur Apparatus	Dust Chamber	Xenon Arc Weather – O Meter
UV Visible Spectrophotometer	Electrodynamics Vibration System	UV Weather-O-Meter
	Water Spray Chamber	Vertical Flammability Chamber

Fuel Lab	Photometry Lab
Automatic Cleveland Open Cup (COC) Flash Point Tester	Integrating Sphere
Automatic Titration System	Photo-Goniometer with Colourimeter & Retroreflection measuring system
Ball Drop Machine	Reflectance and Transmittance Measurement System
Hazemeter	Spectro-Photometer

Metallurgical Lab	Polymer Lab	Tyre Lab	Vehicle Crash Lab
Automatic Rockwell Hardness Tester	Abrasion Testing Machine	Tyre Test Machine	Frontal Impact Test Rig
Brinell cum Vickers Hardness Tester	Differential Scanning Calorimeter	Universal Tyre Testing Machine	Rear Underrun Protective Device Test Facility
Metallurgical Microscope With Image Analyser	Digital Hardness Tester (Shore A)	Truck, Bus Tyre Uniformity Test Machine	Rear Wall Strength Test Rig
Micro Hardness Tester With Motorized stage	Dynamic Mechanical Analyser-4000 (Dma)	Tyre Bursting Test	Roll Over Test Facility
Rockwell Hardness Tester	Fourier Transform Infra Red Spectrometer	Dynamic Wheel Cornering Fatigue Test Machine	Roof Strength Test Rig
Stereo Microscope and Image Analyzer	Moving Die Rheometer 2000	Radial Impact Resistance Test For Wheel Rim	Walk In Chamber (Climatic Chamber)
Three Co-ordinate Measuring Machine	Ozone Chamber		Water Proofing Test Facility
Universal Hardness Tester	Thermo Gravimetric Analyser		
Universal Tensile Testing Machine	Weighing Balance (Special Purpose)		
	Precision Automatic Multihead Hardness Tester		
	Universal Tensile Testing Machine		
	Air Permeability Tester		
	Ozone Machine Chamber		

== Facilities ==
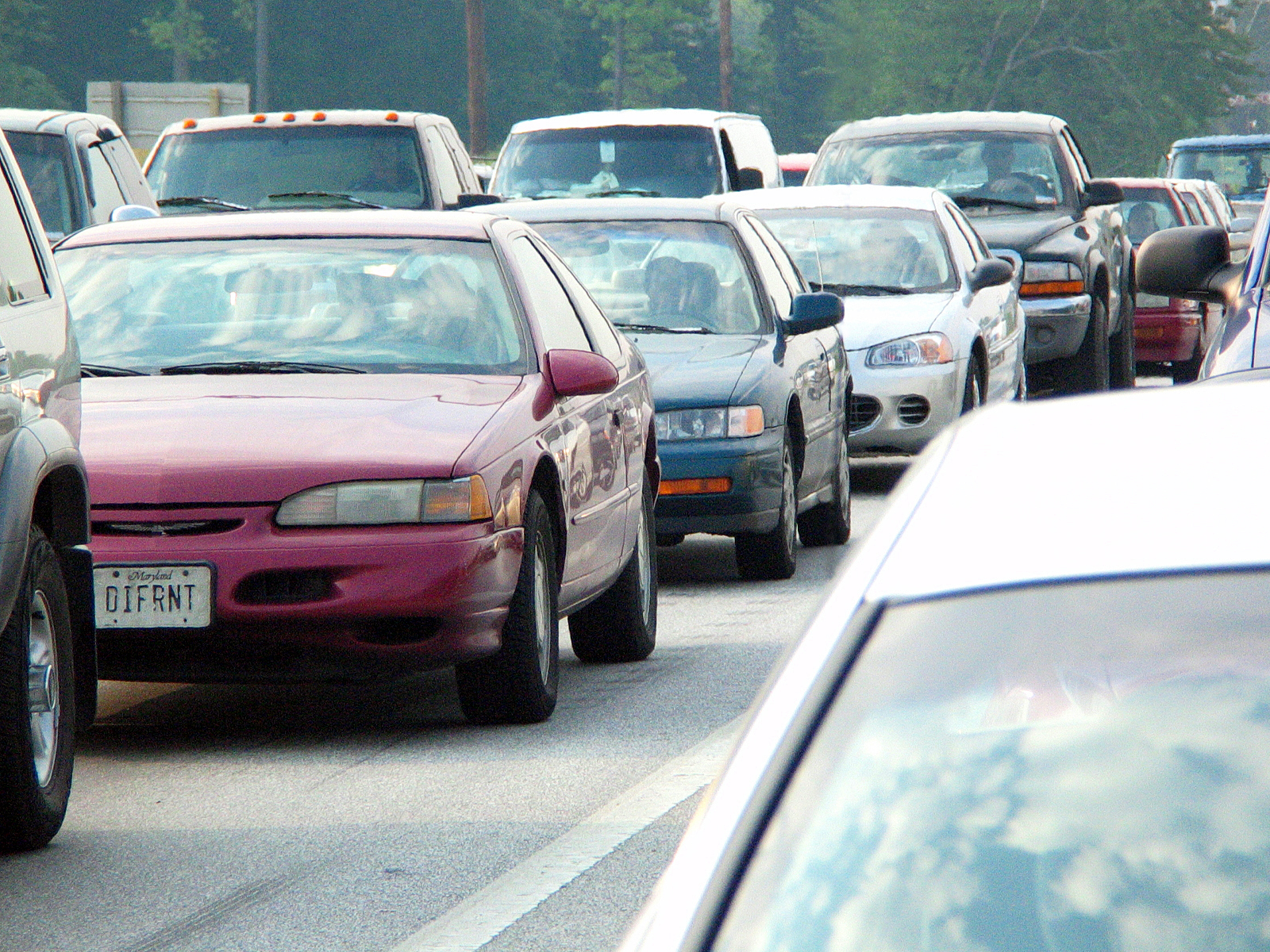
Traffic jam.

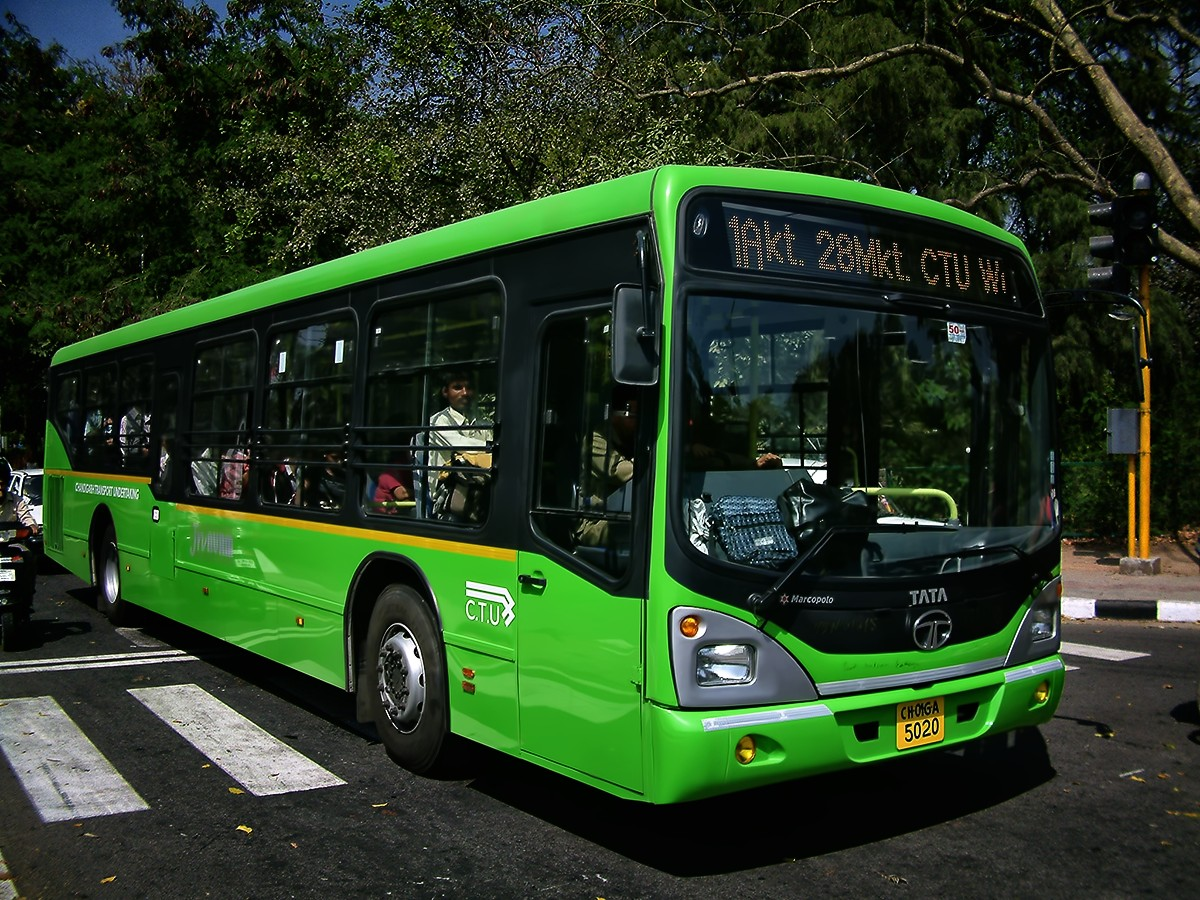
A public transport bus in Chandigarh

Other than the laboratories, CIRT has been accorded with modern facilities such as a library stocking over 10,000 titles, 100 professional journals and several educational films and videos, classrooms, gymnasium, tennis and badminton courts, guest houses, hostels and residential accommodation.

CIRT also maintains a computer centre, catering to the communication and data storage requirements of the institute.

== Research and consultancy ==
CIRT has developed a platform for higher research in the areas of traffic management, planning of rapid transit systems for buses, bicycles etc., bus terminals, driver training institutes and integrated border check posts, road safety audit and Innovative Driving Test System (IDTS) using RFID technology. The Institute provides consultancy services for bus fleet procurement under JNNURM scheme, preparation of feasibility studies for infrastructure development projects, organizational restructuring of transport companies and advice on issues related to Motor Vehicles Act and Central Motor Vehicles Rules.

== Courses ==
CIRT conducts regular courses for the employees of the State Transport organizations, which are classified into four types.

Foundation Courses: These are four to eight week programs, meant for management trainees and is conducted at the CIRT campus. The subject of the programs are decided mutually between CIRT and the relevant State Transport Undertaking.

Management Appreciation Programs: The program aimed at upgradation of senior supervisory level officers for their promotion to managerial cadre. The program is if 4 weeks duration and is conducted at the CIRT campus.

Short Duration Functional Programs: These programs are CIRT campus based or other chose venues and imparts studies in Maintenance Management, Traffic Management, Materials Management, Industrial Relations, Human Resource Management, Management Information Systems, Computer Applications and Financial Management.

In-Situ Programs: This program addresses specific problems of the client organization and is conducted at the client's premises.

== International collaborations ==
CIRT has entered into collaborative arrangements with various international institutions such as:

- Transport Research Laboratory of the United Kingdom: Joint research projects and exchange of professional staff
- University of Westminster: Exchange of faculty
- University of Newcastle (Australia): Exchange of faculty
- University of Loughborough: Exchange of faculty
- TÜV, Munich: MOU for testing automobile components, upgrading facilities and training personnel
- UTAC, Paris: MOU for testing automobile components, upgrading facilities and training personnel
- Institute of Road Safety Research, Hague: Negotiations are underway for establishing a Centre for Road Safety on CIRT campus

== Publications ==
CIRT publishes a journal, Indian Journal of Transport Management, (ISSN 0970-4736) at quarterly intervals, which covers the relevant topics in the transport sector such as transport policies, public and private sector participation, financing, affordability and quality of transport services. The journal is circulated in India and abroad and is listed catalogued by the American Library of Congress.

It also publishes research articles, papers and information on transportation.

== See also ==
- Vehicle
- Automated highway system
- Road train
- Vehicle recovery
- Right- and left-hand traffic
- Road
- Public transport
- Traffic
- Traffic congestion
- Transport engineering
