= Automotive Research Association of India =

Industrial research association

The Automotive Research Association of India (ARAI)
- Type: Public
- Industry: Automotive, Research
- Founded: 1966
- Headquarters: Kothrud, Pune, Maharashtra, India
- Key people: Dr. Reji Mathai, Director
- Website: ARAI

The Automotive Research Association of India (ARAI) is a co-operative industrial research association by the automotive industry with the Ministry of Heavy Industries and the Government Of India. The objectives of the Association are Research and Development in automotive engineering for industry, product design and development, evaluation of automotive equipment and ancillaries, standardization, technical information services, execution of advanced courses on the application of modern technology and conduct of specific tests.

The Automotive Research Association of India (ARAI) is located in the western part of Pune, Maharashtra. The 105 hectares (260 acres) of land houses various laboratories, test facilities spread over 8343 m^{2} of area. It is well connected by air, rail and road about 25 km from Pune Airport and 12 km from the railway station. The Institute has been set up by the Indian Vehicle and automotive ancillary manufacturers and the (Government of India), Ministry of Heavy Industries, as a co-operative industrial research body to provide services to the industry in the fields of applied research and product development in automotive engineering.

It is also responsible for car mileage figure for every car sold in India. ARAI claims to be the first Indian institute to develop HCNG fuel engine.

== History ==
ARAI established in 1966 is located at Pune, India, 150 km from Mumbai. It was incorporated as Industrial Research Organisation formed by the Indian Automotive Industry, affiliated to the Ministry of Heavy Industries, Government of India. The Institute is registered as a Society under the Societies Registration Act XXI of 1860.

== Automotive research ==
In order to meet the development requirements of Industry, several facility and competence build-up projects have been completed. Most notable amongst these are Engine Design/Simulation Software Installation, development of bi-fuel CNG kits, new techniques and software capabilities in Noise, Vibration, Harshness Analysis as well as Vehicle Crash Analysis and VDACS software for chassis dynamometer control. Amongst the new facilities added are the Particulate Measurement System and most modern Digitally Controlled Load Simulation. ARAI has also developed a Simulation Lab, offering end to end services to the automotive industry as well as allied non-automotive industries.

It is the first automotive engineering R&D institute in India to be awarded ISO 9001 Quality System Certification, ISO 14001 Environmental System Certification & OHSAS 18001 Occupational Health & Safety Certification.

Research & Development Divisions

- AED : Automotive Electronics Department
- ERL : Environmental Research Laboratory
- TG : Technology Group
- DTL : Digital Twin Lab
- CAE : Computer Aided Engineering
- FID : Forging Industry Division
- NVH : Noise, Vibration & Harshness
- PTE : Power Train Engineering
- SDL : Structural Dynamics Laboratory

Homologation Divisions

- ECL : Emission Certification Laboratory
- HMR : Homologation & Management Regulation
- HTC : Homologation and Technology Center
- SHL : Safety & Homologation Laboratory
- PSL : Passive Safety Laboratory
- VEL : Vehicle Evaluation Laboratory

Support Divisions

- BDCP : Business Development & Corporate Planning
- CAL : Calibration
- CMC : Central Maintenance Cell
- F&A : Finance & Accounts
- HRMA : Human Resources, Management & Administration
- ID : Infrastructure Development
- ITM : Information Technology Management
- KC : Knowledge Centre
- PMD : Prototype Manufacturing Department
- QMD : Quality Management Department

== See also ==
- Automotive Industry Standards
- International Centre for Automotive Technology
- NATRiP
