= NATRAX =

Indian Automotive Testing Tracks

NATRAX (National Automotive Testing Tracks), Pithampur, Dhar District, Madhya Pradesh, is Asia's longest high-speed state-of-the-art test tracks in India for automotive testing and certification. It is the fifth largest track in the world.

== Background ==
The 11.3-km high-speed track is built under NATRiP (National Automotive Testing and R&D Infrastructure Project), a project of the Ministry of Heavy Industries, Government of India, has an area of approximately 3000 acres and the track is developed in an area of about 1000 acres at a cost or Rs.1321 crores. The Automotive Mission Plan (2016–26) is a vision document by Government of India that was planned for the development of the industry in pursuit of economic growth and the track was part of it. It is located near the industrial township of Pithampur, in Dhar district of Madhya Pradesh. It is 50 km from the Indore, and is on the NH-52 by-pass road which connects Indore to Mumbai.

== Track ==
It has two semi-circular curves that can test vehicles at a maximum neutral speed of 250 km per hour. The track can offer maximum speeds of 375 kmph on the curves with steering control. A lot of different tests, including measurement of maximum speed, acceleration, coast down, brake fade, constant speed fuel consumption, emission tests through real-road driving simulation, can be conducted at this track. It is also a Centre of Excellence (CoE) for vehicle dynamics.

The Minister of Heavy Industries and Public Enterprises Prakash Javadekar inaugurated the track on 29 June 2021. Dr. N. Karuppaiah is the centre head for the track. The track is also suitable for motorsports events but is yet to be homologated by the motorsports federations FIA or FIM. It is yet to get NABL accreditation to be able to issue homologation certificates to OEMs.

== Facilities ==
Test tracks: High-speed track - The high-speed 11.3-km four-lane track is used to develop and homologate all kinds of vehicles. Original Equipment Manufacturers (OEM) can conduct all kinds of tests at one place.

Dynamic platform: The vehicle dynamic platform is the 300-metre steering pad and is connected to 1500-metre long-vehicle dynamic test area.

Multi-friction braking track: With a mu range from 0.15 to 0.9, the Braking Track can conduct braking tests on various surfaces like basalt, ceramic, high-friction asphalt and polish concrete for homologation.

NATRAX also has a gradient track, fatigue track, gravel and off-road track, handling track, comfort track, sustainability track and other facilities like noise track and wet-skid pad.

== Events ==
In May 2022, an auto show was held at NATRAX. About 80 super cars and 60 super bikes from Indore, Bhopal and Delhi took part in different races at the show. The three-day show attracted about 1200 visitors, including students.

In January 2026, the fifth and penultimate round of the Blueband Sports Indian National Rally Championship 2025 was held on the custom-made dirt tracks in the vast open spaces near the testing tracks. Dean Mascarenhas of Mangaluru and co-driver Gagan Karumbaiah of Kodagu clinched the INRC Overall championship with a round to spare on 1 February 2026.
