= International Centre for Automotive Technology =

Automotive research center

- Type: Homologation
- Industry: Automotive, Research
- Founded: 2006
- Headquarters: Manesar, Haryana, India
- Key people: Saurabh Dalela
- Revenue: 225 cr
- Owner: Ministry of Heavy industries
- Number of employees: 490
- Parent: Ministry of Heavy Industries and Public Enterprises, Government of India
- Website: Official Website

International Centre for Automotive Technology (iCAT) is located at Manesar in Gurugram district of Haryana state of India. The Rs 1100 crore facility has facilities for vehicle homologation and also testing laboratories for noise, vibration and harshness (NVH) and passive safety. It also includes a powertrain laboratory, engine dynamometers, emission laboratory with Euro-V capability, a fatigue laboratory, passive safety laboratory, and vehicle test tracks. ICAT is also being developed as a Centre of Excellence (CoE) for component development and NVH.

Tests and approvals of vehicles and their components are conducted under the Central Motor Vehicle Rules (CMVR) – Rule No. 126 for which iCAT is accredited for. iCAT also has permission by BIS (Bureau of Indian Standards) for tests on wheels, tires and glass for BIS certification. iCAT is also accredited by the Central Pollution Control Board (CPCB) for testing and approval of generators.

== Facilities ==
The following facilities are being provided at ICAT:

- Active & passive safety testing
- Component evaluation testing
- Fatigue testing
- Material testing
- EMI / EMC laboratory
- Noise Vibration Harshness
- Powertrain
- Vehicle Evaluation Facilities & Homologation Test Tracks
- Vehicle evaluation
- ICAT Convention Centre (ICC)
- Engine Test Lab
- Vehicle test cell
- On road testing

== See also ==
- Automotive Research & Testing Center
- NATRiP
