= Resonant energy transfer =

Resonant energy transfer may refer to:

- Förster resonance energy transfer
- Resonant inductive coupling
