= Tanning lamp =

Device which produces ultraviolet light used for indoor tanning

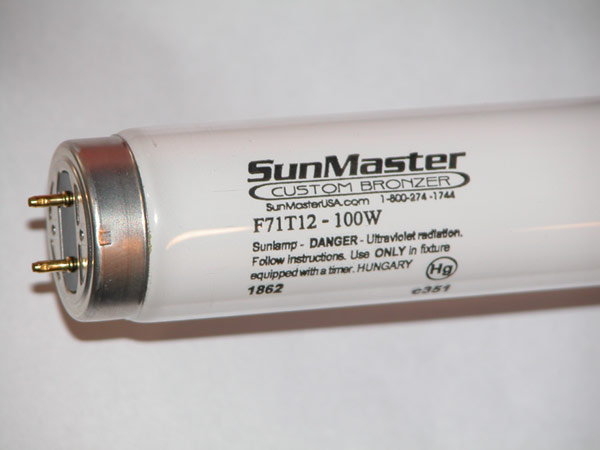
Typical tanning lamp with F71T12 markings. This example is a 71-inch, bi-pin, 100 watt model, the most common.

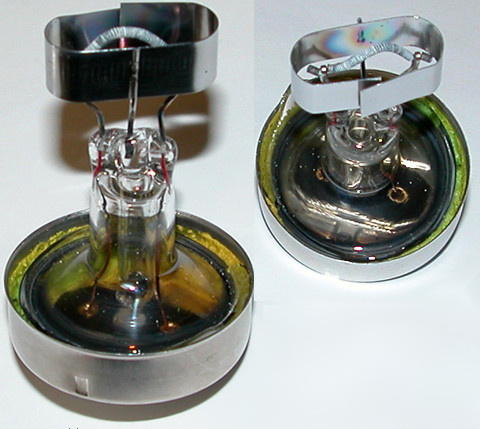
Inside a preheat, bi-pin tanning lamp

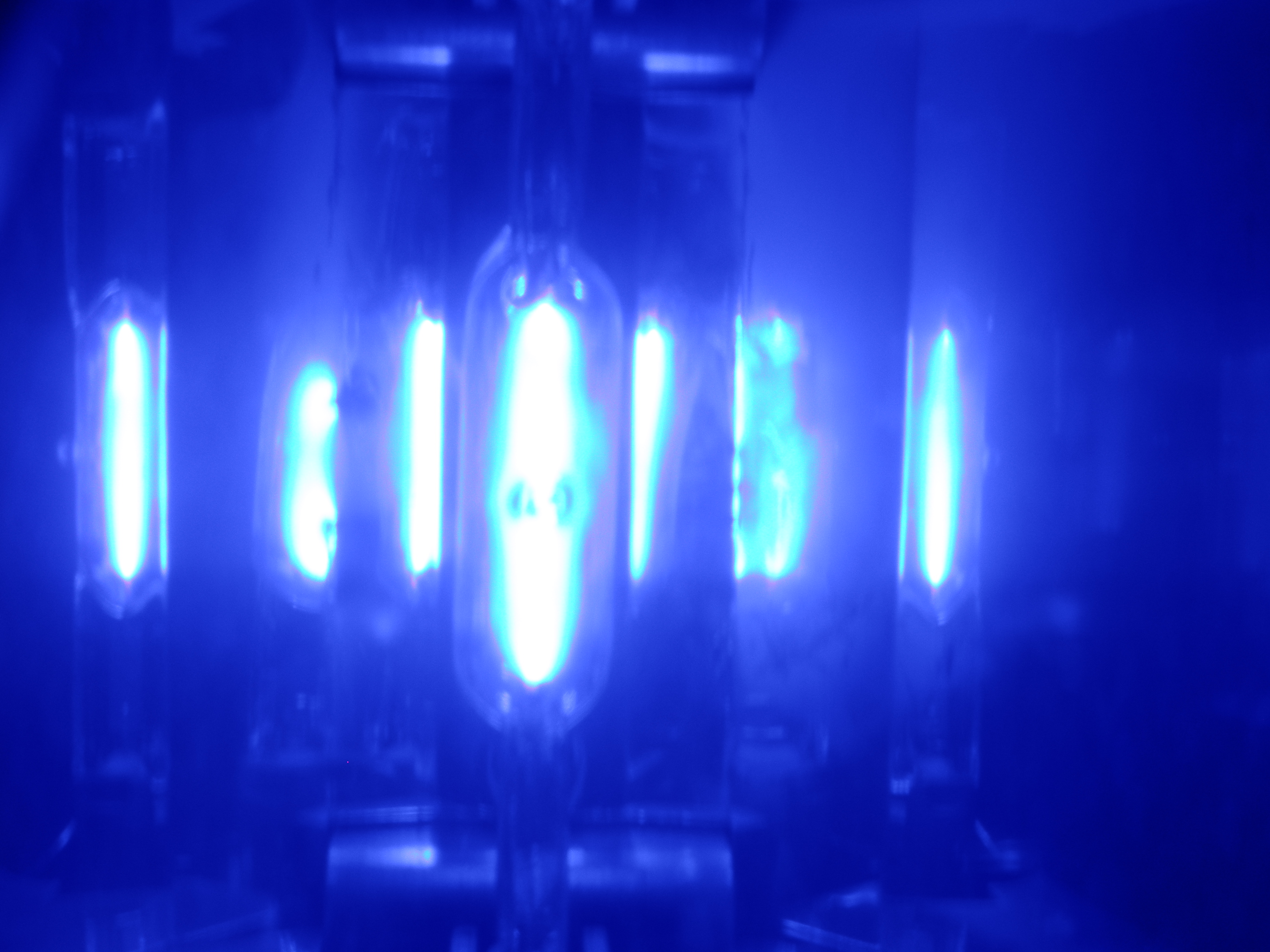
A high-pressure tanning lamp under power

Tanning lamps (sometimes called tanning bulbs in the United States or tanning tubes in Europe) are the part of a tanning bed, booth or other tanning device which produces ultraviolet light used for indoor tanning. There are hundreds of different kinds of tanning lamps most of which can be classified in two basic groups: low pressure and high pressure. Within the industry, it is common to call high-pressure units "bulbs" and low-pressure units "lamps", although there are many exceptions and not everyone follows this example. This is likely due to the size of the unit, rather than the type. Both types require an oxygen free environment inside the lamp.

Fluorescent tanning lamps require an electrical ballast to limit the amount of current going through the lamp. While the resistance of an incandescent lamp filament inherently limits the current inside the lamp, tanning lamps do not and instead have negative resistance. They are plasma devices, like a neon sign, and will pass as much current as the external circuit will provide, even to the point of self-destruction. Thus a ballast is needed to regulate the current through them.

Tanning lamps are installed in a tanning bed, tanning booth, tanning canopy or free standing single bulb tanning unit. The quality of the tan (or how similar it is to a tan from the natural sun) depends upon the spectrum of the light that is generated from the lamps.

== High-pressure bulbs ==
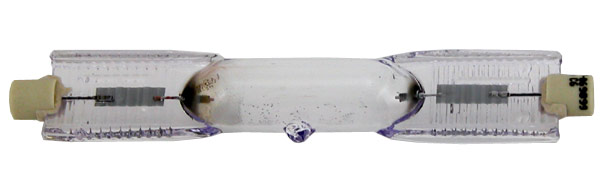
Typical high-pressure bulb. Note the small specks, which are mercury droplets. This is the more common 400W "clip in" or ceramic style.

High-pressure bulbs are 3 to 5 inches long and typically powered by a ballast with 250 to 2,000 watts. The most common is the 400 watt variety that is used as an added face tanner in the traditional tanning bed. High-pressure lamps use quartz glass, and as such do not filter UVC. Because UVC can be deadly, a special dichroic filter glass (usually purple) is required that will filter out the UVC and UVB. The goal with high-pressure tanning bulbs is to produce a high amount of UVA only. Unfiltered light from a high-pressure lamp is rich in UVC used in germicidal lamps, for water purification, but it damages human skin.

The contents of a high-pressure lamp are inert gas (such as argon) and mercury. There are no phosphors used, and the mercury is clearly visible if it is not in a gaseous state. During installation, even a small amount of oil from fingertips can cause the quartz envelope to fail in operation. Most commercial replacement bulbs come with a special pocket wipe, usually containing alcohol, to clean the bulb in case it is accidentally touched during installation. Because the bulb contains mercury, great care should be used if a bulb is broken, to prevent accidental contact or vapor exposure.

== Low-pressure lamps ==
Like all fluorescent lamps, low-pressure tanning lamps have a ballast to start the lamps and limit the flow of current. The plasma of excited mercury atoms inside the lamp emits ultraviolet light directly. The lamps are coated on the inside with special phosphors. Unlike high-pressure lamps, the glass that is used in low-pressure lamps filters out all UVC. Once the plasma is fully formed, the plasma strips away the outer electrons from the mercury; when these electrons return to a lower energy level, visible and ultraviolet light is emitted. Some of the short-wave ultraviolet excites the phosphors, which then emits photons in the proper spectrum for tanning.

== Ballasts ==
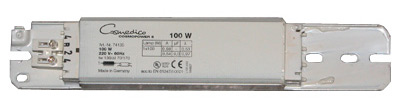
Ballast used in most tanning beds. Requires a lamp starter (below) and large capacitors.

In the older style (but still most popular) "choke ballast", each end of the lamp has its own cathode and anode, however, once the lamp has started, the plasma flows from one end of the lamp to the other, with each end acting as a single cathode or anode. The starter is a plasma switch itself, and temporarily connects the cathode on one end of the lamp to the anode on the other end of the lamp, causing the lamp ends to heat up quickly, or "preheat". Many F71 lamps are still called "pre-heat bi-pin" for this reason.

Newer electronic systems work differently and always treat one end of the lamp as a cathode and one end as an anode. Whereas the choke style always works at 230 V AC at 60 Hz (220–240 V AC/50 Hz in Europe), newer electronics work very differently. This includes magnetic, pure solid state, and high frequency ballasts. These new ballasts operate at voltages up to 600 V AC, and at 20,000 Hz, with some high frequency ballasts operating as high as 100,000 Hz or higher. This allows the ballast to energize the lamp with more than raw power, and instead operates using a combination of electrical force and induction. This allows a 100 watt lamp to fully light with as little as 65 watts.

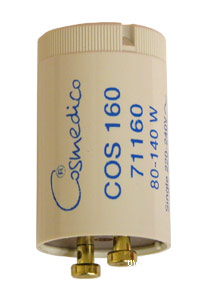
S12 lamp starter.

The disadvantage of the newer electronics is price. It can cost 3 to 5 times more per lamp to use electronic ballasts than traditional choke ballasts, which is why choke ballasts are still used in the majority of new tanning systems. Another disadvantage of the older style choke ballast is they are designed for European electricity, and require incoming voltage in the range of 220 V AC and 230 V AC. Most US homes have 110 V service and businesses use 208 V three-phase service that requires these beds to use a buck-boost transformer in order to receive the proper voltage. Too low a voltage will result in the lamp starter not letting the lamp ignite (or at the least, very slowly) whereas too high a voltage can lead to premature failure in the starters and lamps. The average cost of these transformers is $200 to $250. While this makes the newer electronics cost about the same for the typical tanning bed, buckboost transformers are usually sold separately, so the total cost is not always obvious to the consumer at first glance.

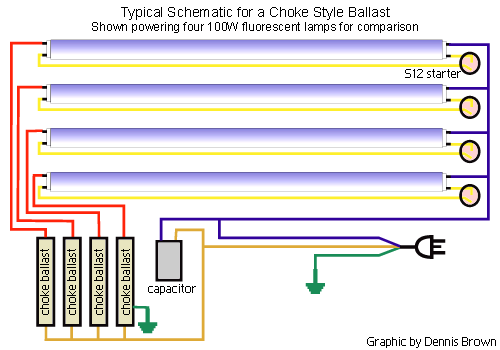
Schematic for Choke Ballasts: Note the use of one ballast per lamp, one lamp starter per lamp and a capacitor. Tanning beds may use 1 or several capacitors, depending on rating. These systems require 230 V AC

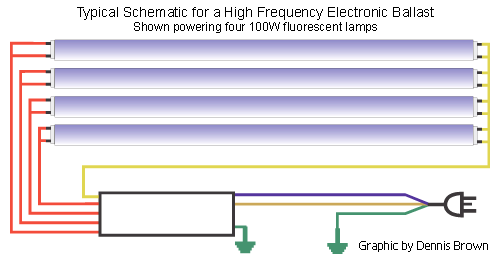
Schematic for HF Ballasts: It is much simpler as everything is self-contained. The main disadvantage is price, costing several times more than a choke ballast. They can be configured to run on 120 V or 230 V.

== Low-pressure lamp sizes and powers ==
Tanning lamps come in several configurations which are considered standards within the industry, including:

- F59 and F60 - 80 watt lamps (shorter lamps to go in front of face tanning "buckets")
- F71, F72, F73, F74 - Typically 100 W, although some F74 are 120 W.
- F71 - 160 W versions of the F71 for use in more expensive salon equipment, but a special ballast is required.
- F71 - 200 W versions of the F71 for use in more expensive salon equipment, but a special ballast is required.
- F59 - 140 W versions, shorter versions of the above lamp
- F79, 2M - 200 W (2 metres) used only in very expensive tanning booths and beds.

The power listing for lamps is not absolute, as you can drive a lamp with less power than listed if you use certain solid state ballasts. You can also use a 160 W lamp with a 100 W ballast, although there are no advantages to this. Using a 100 W lamp with a 160 W ballast, however, can lead to quick failure as the cathode/anode of some 100 W lamps can not take the extra power. The lamps will operate at any frequency (50 Hz to 120,000 Hz or higher). However, the ballasts and other electrical systems on the tanning bed are sensitive to frequency.

== Lamp life ==
Like all fluorescent lamps, the low-pressure lamps will burn for a long period of time. They will, however, lose their ability to produce a reasonable amount of UV after a short while. Typical lifespans for low-pressure lamps are from 300 to 1,600 hours of actual use although they may light and produce very little UV for as much as 5000 hours. High-pressure lamps range from 300 to 1,000 hours, and should be replaced when they have reached their maximum life to prevent any possible damage to the ballast, although this is very rare. Lamp manufacturers generally rate the "life" of the lamp to be the period of time that the lamp will continue to emit at least 70% to 80% of the initial UV.

== Lamp types ==
In addition to standard lamps, there are also lamps with reflectors built inside. This is accomplished by taking the raw glass before any phosphor is used and pouring a white, opaque, highly reflective chemical on the inside of the lamp. This is done only on a certain percentage of the lamp, such as 210 degrees or 180 degrees, so that the remaining lamp is NOT coated. After this coating has dried or has been treated to ensure it will stick to the surface of the glass (using heat, for example) the lamp is coated on the inside with the phosphor blend as usual. Anywhere from 3 to 5 different chemicals are typically used in a blend, with the actual proportions and chemicals closely guarded as trade secrets.

The 100 watt version of a reflector lamp is typically called a RUVA (Reflector UVA) or less commonly HO-R (High Output - Reflector). The 160 watt version are called VHO-R (Very High Output - Reflector). The name "VHR" describe 160 W reflector lamps and is a registered trademark of Cosmedico, Ltd. There are many other variations of low-pressure tanning lamps including 26 watt, 80 watt, and 200 watt to name a few.

== UV output rating ==
This is one of the most confusing aspects of tanning lamps in North America, as lamps in the US are not rated for their total output, but rather their ratio of UVA to UVB. Most people could be led to believe that a 6.5% lamp is stronger than a 5% lamp, while both lamps might have the same total UV output (or the 5% could even be stronger across the spectrum).

As such, UVA vs UVB rating on lamps only tells you the relative amount of UV, making a 5% lamp really a lamp whose UV spectrum is 5% UVB and 95% UVA. There are no accepted published numbers for rating the overall power for lamps, except the TE (time exposure), which is almost as useless for making comparisons.

The TE isn't generally published, although it is usually available from the lamp manufacturer on request. Because the U.S. Food and Drug Administration (FDA) biases tests against UVB, the TE may make a weaker lamp appear stronger by having more UVB. Furthermore, although tanning beds are rated with exposure times, tanning lamps are not because beds can vary widely as to how a given lamp affects the user, making it difficult or impossible to compare the total UV output of different low-pressure lamps.

The UVB to UVA ratio percentage is considered a technologically outdated form of measuring a lamp's overall UV output and Wolff "Metric" now lists actual UVA, UVB and total UV flux powers. This is the best way of measuring a low-pressure and high-pressure lamp. Wolff measured lamp outputs are listed here If you are purchasing a lamp from any manufacturer always ask for actual flux power output, as UVA to UVB ratios tell very little.

== Lamp maintenance and replacement ==
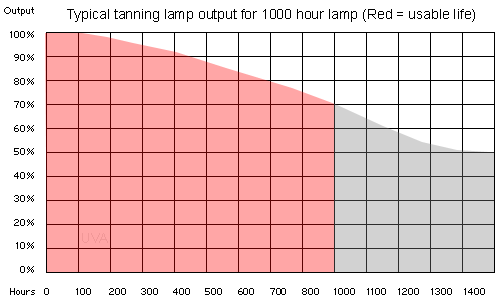
Typical output curve of a 1,000-hour-rated low-pressure tanning lamp. At 1,000 hours, the output becomes less than 70% of rated power.

Tanning lamps are virtually maintenance free, but must be kept clean, as UV can easily be blocked by dust drawn in from the cooling system (or from improperly cleaned acrylics shields). Most manufacturers recommend wiping the lamps and other internals clean every 200 to 300 hours of operation. Most salons will replace their tanning lamps once per year, while home tanning bed owners can expect 3 to 5 years of use. This depends solely on the number of hours the lamps have been used and the rated life of the lamp, which varies from model to model.

High-pressure lamps must be handled very carefully, as any oil from the skin that is left on the bulb can cause the bulb to overheat and lead to early failure. The filter glass must also be handled carefully as it is extremely fragile by its nature. These should only be cleaned with special chemicals designed for this purpose. Operating any tanning equipment that uses high-pressure bulbs without the special filter glass is extremely dangerous, and illegal in a salon, due to the high amount of UVC generated in the bulbs.

The amount of UV that is generated from a low-pressure lamp is highly dependent on the temperature in the tanning unit. As a rule, tanning lamps produce the highest amount of ultraviolet light when this temperature is between 90 and 110 °F (32 and 43 °C). As the temperature moves away from this range, the amount of UV produced is reduced. Cooling systems for tanning equipment are usually designed to maintain a range of temperature instead of providing maximum airflow for this reason. Higher temperatures will also reduce the expected life of the tanning lamp. This is why it is important to perform regular maintenance, including checking cooling fans and insuring that vent holes are not blocked. The owners manual for the tanning equipment is the best source for maintenance schedules and methods.

== Other uses ==
In addition to their use in tanning, tanning lamps are used for the treatment of psoriasis, eczema, vitiligo.

== Mercury hazards ==
All fluorescent lamps contain mercury, and at this time, no suitable replacement has been found. Many US states have banned disposal of lamps containing mercury, and have established regulations requiring that lamps containing mercury are identified as such. This has not caused problems for manufacturers, however, as lamps are not produced locally, and often not in the US. There have been several efforts to label all lamps that contain mercury with a universally accepted symbol, Hg. Old lamps should be handled as would be any hazardous material, and persons should take special precautions when dealing with broken lamps to avoid contact with mercury. This is particularly true for pregnant women. These laws and guidelines are not unique to tanning lamps, and apply to all fluorescent lamps, other lamps that contain mercury, as well as other products that contain mercury with the exception of pharmaceuticals. Proper disposal or recycling will prevent the mercury content of the lamps from entering the environment.

== See also ==
- Excimer lamp
- Suntanning
- Vitamin D
- Indoor tanning
