= Short-circuit inductance =

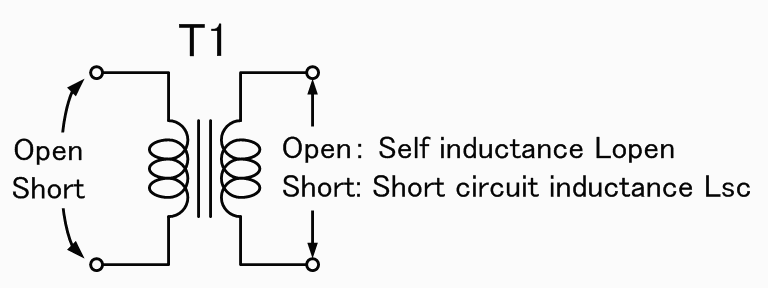
Measurement of short-circuit inductance

Short-circuit inductance of a real linear two-winding transformer is inductance measured across the primary or secondary winding when the other winding is short-circuited. (Note: This value is sometimes imprecisely referred to as leakage inductance) The method of measuring the short circuit inductance is described in industrial standard. The industrial standard also stipulates a method for obtaining the coupling factor by combining it with the open circuit inductance value.

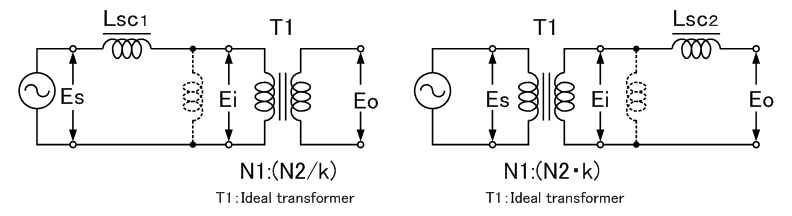
Equivalent circuit

Measured primary and secondary short-circuit inductances may be considered as constituent parts of primary and secondary self-inductances. They are derived by using Ho-Thevenin's theorem from the equivalent inductance of the three-terminal equivalent circuit as follows. Then they are related according to the coupling factor as,

$$L_{\mathrm{sc1}} = (1-k^2)\cdot L_{\mathrm{1}}\,$$
$$L_{\mathrm{sc2}} = (1-k^2)\cdot L_{\mathrm{2}}\,$$

Where

- k is coupling coefficient
- L_{1} is primary self-inductance
- L_{2} is secondary self-inductance

Short-circuit inductance measurement is used in conjunction with open-circuit inductance measurements to obtain various derived quantities like $k$, the inductive coupling factor and $\sigma$, the inductive leakage factor. $k$ is derived according to: (Note: the same k value can be obtained measured from the primary side or from the secondary side)

$$k = \sqrt{1 - \frac{L_\text{sc}}{L_\text{oc}}}$$

where

- $L_\text{sc}$ is the short-circuit measurement of primary or secondary inductance
- $L_\text{oc}$ is the corresponding open-circuit measurement of primary or secondary inductance

Other transformer parameters like leakage inductance and mutual inductance which cannot be directly measured may be defined in terms of k.

Short-circuit inductance is one of the parameters that determines the resonance frequency of the magnetic phase synchronous coupling in a resonant transformer and wireless power transfer. Short-circuit inductance is the main component of the current-limiting parameter in leakage transformer applications.

== See also ==
- Resonant inductive coupling
