= WREL (technology) =

Form of wireless resonant energy transfer technology

WREL (an acronym for Wireless Resonant Energy Link) is a form of wireless resonant energy transfer technology developed by Intel.

The technology relies on strongly coupled based on resonant inductive coupling caused by electromagnetic resonators, a principle similar to the way a trained singer can shatter a glass using his/her voice. At the receiving resonator's natural frequency, energy is absorbed efficiently, just as a glass absorbs acoustic energy at its natural frequency. At the wall socket, power is put into magnetic fields at a transmitting resonator - basically an antenna. The receiving resonator is tuned to efficiently absorb energy from the magnetic field, whereas nearby objects do not.

== Benefits ==
With this technology enabled in a laptop, for example, batteries could be recharged when the laptop gets within several feet of the transmit resonator.

== History ==
Resonant magnetic power transfer was pioneered by Nikola Tesla. Some of his later Tesla coils use a loosely coupled resonant magnetic power system. The lower coil was energised, and this transferred power via magnetic resonance to the resonant top coil where the high voltage was generated. This was predominantly done to avoid arcing and permit higher voltages.

For power supply for more everyday uses the technology is based on principles of WiTricity proposed by Marin Soljačić, a physicist at MIT.

Intel chief technology officer Justin Rattner demonstrated powering a light bulb without the use of a plug or wire of any kind as he spoke at the California firm's annual developers forum in San Francisco 2008-08-21. Electricity was sent wirelessly to a lamp on stage, lighting a 60 watt light bulb that uses more power than a typical laptop computer.

== Principles ==
In a resonating system, the quality of the resonance is determined by its Q factor; 2 pi times the ratio of the energy in the resonant circuit divided by its loss per cycle.

When two non resonating coils are placed some distance apart, some fraction of the magnetic field from one coil couples into the second, and so changes in the magnetic field of one coil generates a voltage at the other (in accordance with Faraday's law of induction), however little of the energy will couple because most of the field will miss the receiver. The fraction of the field that does couple is called the coupling coefficient.

However, it may be seen that if some energy is placed in a 'sender' coil when it is in resonance then the coil will ring for a number of cycles before losing the energy to its resistance. Provided the Q of the transmitting circuit is high enough to overcome the coupling coefficient, then most of the power can eventually be absorbed by the receiving coil over several cycles and can be tapped off. The remaining power will be lost in the resistance of the sender, and some in the receiver coil also.

== See also ==
- WiTricity
- Nikola Tesla
- Wireless energy transfer
- Evanescent wave coupling
- Coupled inductors
- List of emerging technologies
