= Resonant inductive coupling =

Phenomenon with inductive coupling

Diagram of the most basic resonant inductive coupling wireless power transfer system. This is called 2nd-resonance technology.

Diagram of the "WiTricity" resonant inductive wireless power system demonstrated by Marin Soljačić's MIT team in 2007. The resonant circuits were coils of copper wire which resonated with their internal capacitance (dotted capacitors) at 10 MHz. Power was coupled into the transmitter resonator, and out of the receiver resonator into the rectifier, by small coils which also served for impedance matching. In this regard, MIT researchers believe they discovered a new way to wirelessly transfer power using non-radiative electromagnetic energy resonant tunneling.

Resonant inductive coupling or magnetic phase synchronous coupling is a phenomenon with inductive coupling in which the coupling becomes stronger when the "secondary" (load-bearing) side of the loosely coupled coil resonates. A resonant transformer of this type is often used in analog circuitry as a bandpass filter. Resonant inductive coupling is also used in wireless power systems for portable computers, phones, and vehicles.

== Applications ==
Various resonant coupling systems in use or are under development for short range (up to 2 meters) wireless electricity systems to power laptops, tablets, smartphones, robot vacuums, implanted medical devices, and vehicles like electric cars, SCMaglev trains and automated guided vehicles. Specific technologies include:

- WiTricity
- Rezence
- eCoupled
- Wireless Resonant Energy Link (WREL)

Other applications include:

- Data transmission such as with passive RFID tags (for example in a passport) and contactless smart cards.
- Resonant transformer of a power inverter that powers a cold-cathode fluorescent lamp.
- Couple the stages of a superheterodyne receiver, where the selectivity of the receiver is provided by tuned transformers in the intermediate-frequency amplifiers.
- High voltage (one million volt) sources for X-ray production.

The Tesla coil is a resonant transformer circuit used to generate very high voltages, and is able to provide much higher current than high voltage electrostatic machines such as the Van de Graaff generator.

Resonant transformers are widely used in radio circuits as bandpass filters, and in switching power supplies.

== History ==
In 1894 Nikola Tesla used resonant inductive coupling, also known as "electro-dynamic induction" to wirelessly light up phosphorescent and incandescent lamps at the 35 South Fifth Avenue laboratory, and later at the 46 E. Houston Street laboratory in New York City. In 1897 he patented a device called the high-voltage, resonant transformer or "Tesla coil." Transferring electrical energy from the primary coil to the secondary coil by resonant induction, a Tesla coil is capable of producing very high voltages at high frequency. The improved design allowed for the safe production and utilization of high-potential electrical currents, "without serious liability of the destruction of the apparatus itself and danger to persons approaching or handling it."

In the early 1960s resonant inductive wireless energy transfer was used successfully in implantable medical devices including such devices as pacemakers and artificial hearts. While the early systems used a resonant receiver coil, later systems implemented resonant transmitter coils as well. These medical devices are designed for high efficiency using low power electronics while efficiently accommodating some misalignment and dynamic twisting of the coils. The separation between the coils in implantable applications is commonly less than 20 cm. Today resonant inductive energy transfer is regularly used for providing electric power in many commercially available medical implantable devices.

Wireless electric energy transfer for experimentally powering electric automobiles and buses is a higher power application (>10 kW) of resonant inductive energy transfer. High power levels are required for rapid recharging and high energy transfer efficiency is required both for operational economy and to avoid negative environmental impact of the system. An experimental electrified roadway test track built circa 1990 achieved just above 60% energy efficiency while recharging the battery of a prototype bus at a specially equipped bus stop. The bus could be outfitted with a retractable receiving coil for greater coil clearance when moving. The gap between the transmit and receive coils was designed to be less than 10 cm when powered. In addition to buses the use of wireless transfer has been investigated for recharging electric automobiles in parking spots and garages as well.

Some of these wireless resonant inductive devices operate at low milliwatt power levels and are battery powered. Others operate at higher kilowatt power levels. Current implantable medical and road electrification device designs achieve more than 75% transfer efficiency at an operating distance between the transmit and receive coils of less than 10 cm.

In 1993, Professor John Boys and Professor Grant Covic, of the University of Auckland in New Zealand, developed systems to transfer large amounts of energy across small air gaps. It was putting into practical use as the moving crane and the AGV non-contact power supply in Japan. In 1998, RFID tags were patented that were powered in this way.

In November 2006, Marin Soljačić and other researchers at the Massachusetts Institute of Technology applied this near field behavior to wireless power transmission, based on strongly-coupled resonators. In a theoretical analysis, they demonstrate that, by designing electromagnetic resonators that suffer minimal loss due to radiation and absorption and have a near field with mid-range extent (namely a few times the resonator size), mid-range efficient wireless energy-transfer is possible. The reason is that, if two such resonant circuits tuned to the same frequency are within a fraction of a wavelength, their near fields (consisting of 'evanescent waves') couple by means of evanescent wave coupling. Oscillating waves develop between the inductors, which can allow the energy to transfer from one object to the other within times much shorter than all loss times, which were designed to be long, and thus with the maximum possible energy-transfer efficiency. Since the resonant wavelength is much larger than the resonators, the field can circumvent extraneous objects in the vicinity and thus this mid-range energy-transfer scheme does not require line-of-sight. By utilizing in particular the magnetic field to achieve the coupling, this method can be safe, since magnetic fields interact weakly with living organisms.

Apple Inc. applied for a patent on the technology in 2010, after WiPower did so in 2008.

In the past, the power source used on the JR Tokai SCMaglev car was generating with a gas turbine generator. In 2011, they succeeded in powering while driving (CWD:charge while driving) across a large gap by the JR Tokai proprietary 9.8 kHz phase synchronization technology developed based on technology similar to AGV's wireless power scheme. And the Japanese Ministry of Land, Infrastructure and Transportation evaluated the technology as all the problems for practical use were cleared. Construction of SCMaglev begin and commercial use will start in 2027.

== Comparison ==
Type p-p basic transmitter and receiver circuits, Rs and Rr are the resistances and losses in the associated capacitors and inductors. Ls and Lr are coupled by small coupling coefficient, k, usually below 0.2

Non-resonant coupled inductors, such as typical transformers, work on the principle of a primary coil generating a magnetic field and a secondary coil subtending as much as possible of that field so that the power passing through the secondary is as close as possible to that of the primary. This requirement that the field be covered by the secondary results in very short range and usually requires a magnetic core. Over greater distances the non-resonant induction method is highly inefficient and wastes the vast majority of the energy in resistive losses of the primary coil.

Using resonance can help improve efficiency dramatically. If resonant coupling is used, the secondary coil is capacitive loaded so as to form a tuned LC circuit. If the primary coil is driven at the secondary side resonant frequency, it turns out that significant power may be transmitted between the coils over a range of a few times the coil diameters at reasonable efficiency.

Compared to the costs associated with batteries, particularly non-rechargeable batteries, the costs of the batteries are hundreds of times higher. In situations where a source of power is available nearby, it can be a cheaper solution. In addition, whereas batteries need periodic maintenance and replacement, resonant energy transfer can be used instead. Batteries additionally generate pollution during their construction and their disposal which is largely avoided.

== Regulations and safety ==
Unlike mains-wired equipment, no direct electrical connection is needed and hence equipment can be sealed to minimize the possibility of electric shock.

Because the coupling is achieved using predominantly magnetic fields; the technology may be relatively safe. Safety standards and guidelines do exist in most countries for electromagnetic field exposures (e.g. ICNIRP). Whether the system can meet the guidelines or the less stringent legal requirements depends on the delivered power and range from the transmitter. Maximum recommended B-field is a complicated function of frequency, the ICNIRP guidelines for example permit RMS fields of tens of microteslas below 100 kHz, falling with frequency to 200 nanoteslas in the VHF, and lower levels above 400 MHz, where body parts can sustain current loops comparable to a wavelength in diameter, and deep tissue energy absorption reaches a maximum.

Deployed systems already generate magnetic fields, for example induction cookers in the tens of kHz where high fields are permitted, and contactless smart card readers, where higher frequency is possible as the required energies are lower.

A study for the Swedish military found that 85 kHz systems for dynamic wireless power transfer for vehicles can cause electromagnetic interference at a radius of up to 300 kilometers.

== Mechanism details ==
=== Overview ===
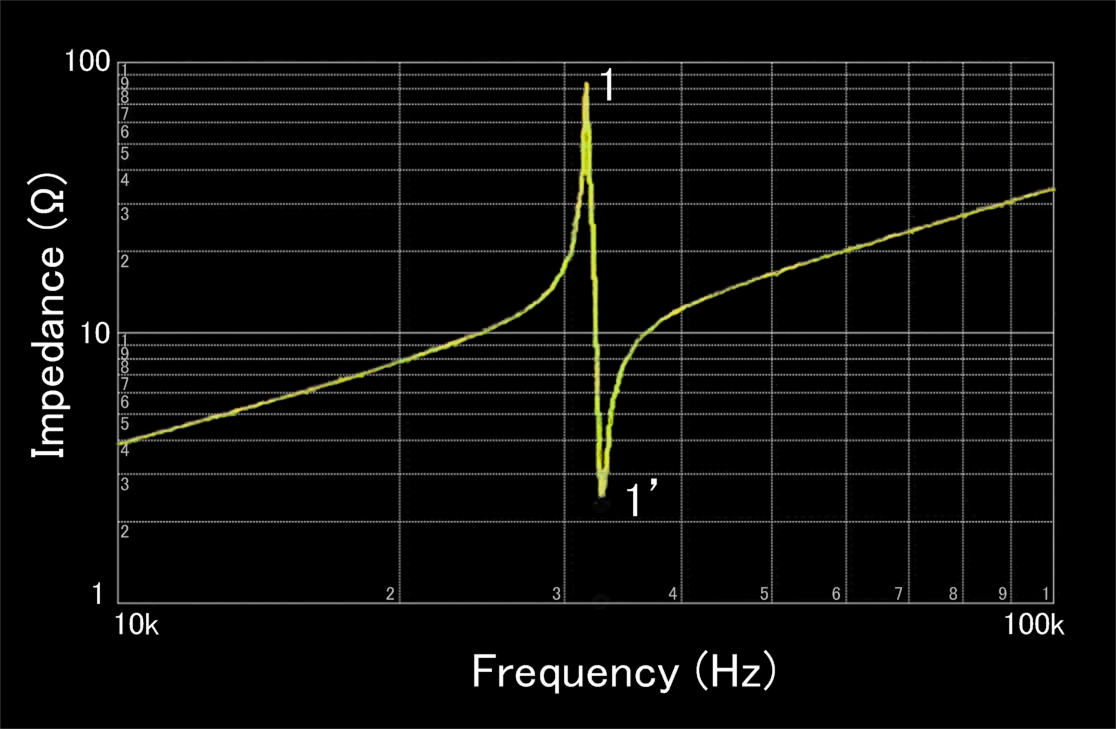
Two resonances as a pair are observed

This process occurs in a resonant transformer, an electrical component which transformer consists of high Q coil wound on the same core with a capacitor connected across a coil to make a coupled LC circuit.

The most basic resonant inductive coupling consists of one drive coil on the primary side and one resonance circuit on the secondary side. In this case, when the resonant state on the secondary side is observed from the primary side, two resonances as a pair are observed. One of them is called the antiresonant frequency (parallel resonant frequency 1), and the other is called the resonant frequency (serial resonant frequency 1'). The short-circuit inductance and resonant capacitor of the secondary coil are combined into a resonant circuit. When the primary coil is driven with a resonant frequency (serial resonant frequency) of the secondary side, the phases of the magnetic fields of the primary coil and the secondary coil are synchronized. As a result, the maximum voltage is generated on the secondary coil due to the increase of the mutual flux, and the copper loss of the primary coil is reduced, the heat generation is reduced, and the efficiency is relatively improved. The resonant inductive coupling is the near field wireless transmission of electrical energy between magnetically coupled coils, which is part of a resonant circuit tuned to resonate at the same frequency as the driving frequency.

=== Coupling coefficient in the resonance state ===
In the transformer, only part of the flux generated by current through the primary coil is coupled to the secondary coil and vice versa. The part that couples is called mutual flux and the part that does not couple is called leakage flux. When the system is not in the resonance state, this leads to the open-circuit voltage appearing at the secondary being less than predicted by the turns ratio of the coils. The degree of coupling is captured by a parameter called coupling coefficient. The coupling coefficient, k, is defined as the ratio of transformer open-circuit voltage ratio to the ratio that would be obtained if all the flux coupled from one coil to the other. However, if it is not open circuit, the flux ratio will change. The value of k lies between 0 and ±1. Each coil inductance can be notionally divided into two parts in the proportions k:(1−k). These are respectively an inductance producing the mutual flux and an inductance producing the leakage flux.

Coupling coefficient is a function of the geometry of the system. It is fixed by the positional relationship between the two coils. The coupling coefficient does not change between when the system is in the resonance state and when it is not in the resonance state, or even if the system is in resonance state and a secondary voltage larger than the turns ratio is generated. However, in the resonance case, the flux ratio changes and the mutual flux increases.

Resonant systems are said to be tightly coupled, loosely coupled, critically coupled or overcoupled. Tight coupling is when the coupling coefficient is around 1 as with conventional iron-core transformers. Overcoupling is when the secondary coil is so close and the formation of mutual flux is hindered by the effect of antiresonance, and critical coupling is when the transfer in the passband is optimal. Loose coupling is when the coils are distant from each other, so that most of the flux misses the secondary. In Tesla coils around 0.2 is used, and at greater distances, for example for inductive wireless power transmission, it may be lower than 0.01.

=== Voltage gain (Type P-P) ===
Generally the voltage gain of non resonantly coupled coils is directly proportional to the square root of the ratio of secondary and primary inductances.

$$A = k \sqrt{\frac{L_2}{L_1}} \,$$

However, if in the state of resonant coupling, higher voltage is generated. The short-circuit inductance L_{sc2} on the secondary side can be obtained by the following formula.

$$L_{sc2}=(1-k^2)\cdot{L_2}$$

The short-circuit inductance L_{sc2} and the resonance capacitor Cr on the secondary side resonate. The resonance frequency ω_{2} is as follows.

$$\omega_2 = {1 \over \sqrt{L_{sc2} C_r}} = {1 \over \sqrt{(1-k^2)\cdot{L_2} C_r}}$$

Assuming that the load resistance is Rl, the Q value of the secondary resonance circuit is as follows.

$$Q_2 = R_l \sqrt{\frac{C_r}{L_{sc2}}} \,$$

The voltage generated in the resonance capacitor Cr at the peak of the resonance frequency is proportional to the Q value. Therefore, the voltage gain Ar of the secondary coil with respect to the primary coil when the system is resonating,

$$A_r = kQ_2 \sqrt{\frac{L_2}{L_1}} \,$$

In the case of the Type P-P, Q1 does not contribute to the voltage gain.

=== WiTricity type resonant inductive coupling system ===
The WiTricity type magnetic resonance is characterized in that the resonant coils on the primary side and the resonant coils on the secondary side are paired. The primary resonant coil increases the primary driving coil current and increases the generated magnetic flux around the primary resonator. This is equivalent to driving the primary coil at high voltage. In the case of the type on the left figure, the general principle is that if a given oscillating amount of energy (for example a pulse or a series of pulses) is placed into a primary coil which is capacitively loaded, the coil will 'ring', and form an oscillating magnetic field.

Resonant transfer works by making a coil ring with an oscillating current. This generates an oscillating magnetic field. Because the coil is highly resonant, any energy placed in the coil dies away relatively slowly over very many cycles; but if a second coil is brought near it, the coil can pick up most of the energy before it is lost, even if it is some distance away. The fields used are predominantly non-radiative, near fields (sometimes called evanescent waves), as all hardware is kept well within the 1/4 wavelength distance they radiate little energy from the transmitter to infinity.

The energy will transfer back and forth between the magnetic field in the inductor and the electric field across the capacitor at the resonant frequency. This oscillation will die away at a rate determined by the gain-bandwidth (Q factor), mainly due to resistive and radiative losses. However, provided the secondary coil cuts enough of the field that it absorbs more energy than is lost in each cycle of the primary, then most of the energy can still be transferred.

Because the Q factor can be very high, (experimentally around a thousand has been demonstrated with air cored coils) only a small percentage of the field has to be coupled from one coil to the other to achieve high efficiency, even though the field dies quickly with distance from a coil, the primary and secondary can be several diameters apart.

It can be shown that a figure of merit for the efficiency is:

$$U = k \sqrt{Q_1 Q_2}$$

Where Q_{1} and Q_{2} are the Q factors of the source and receiver coils respectively, and k is the coupling coefficient described above.

And the maximum achievable efficiency is:

$$\eta_{opt} = \frac {U^2} {(1 + \sqrt{1 + U^2}) ^ 2}$$

=== Power transfer ===
Because the Q can be very high, even when low power is fed into the transmitter coil, a relatively intense field builds up over multiple cycles, which increases the power that can be received—at resonance far more power is in the oscillating field than is being fed into the coil, and the receiver coil receives a percentage of that.

=== Transmitter coils and circuitry ===
Unlike the multiple-layer secondary of a non-resonant transformer, coils for this purpose are often single layer solenoids (to minimise skin effect and give improved Q) in parallel with a suitable capacitor. Alternative resonator geometries include wave-wound Litz wire and loop-gap resonators (LGRs). In the Litz wire-based resonators, insulation is either absent or low permittivity and low-loss materials such as silk are used to minimise dielectric losses. The LGR geometries have the advantage that electric fields outside the resonator structure are very weak which minimizes human exposure to electric fields and makes the power transfer efficiency insensitive to nearby dielectrics.

To progressively feed energy into the primary coil with each cycle, different circuits can be used. One circuit employs a Colpitts oscillator.

In Tesla coils an intermittent switching system, a "circuit controller" or "break," is used to inject an impulsive signal into the primary coil; the secondary coil then rings and decays.

=== Receiver coils and circuitry ===
The receiver of a smart card has a coil connected to a chip which provides capacitance to give resonance as well as regulators to provide a suitable voltage

The secondary receiver coils are similar designs to the primary sending coils. Running the secondary at the same resonant frequency as the primary ensures that the secondary has a low impedance at the transmitter's frequency and that the energy is optimally absorbed.

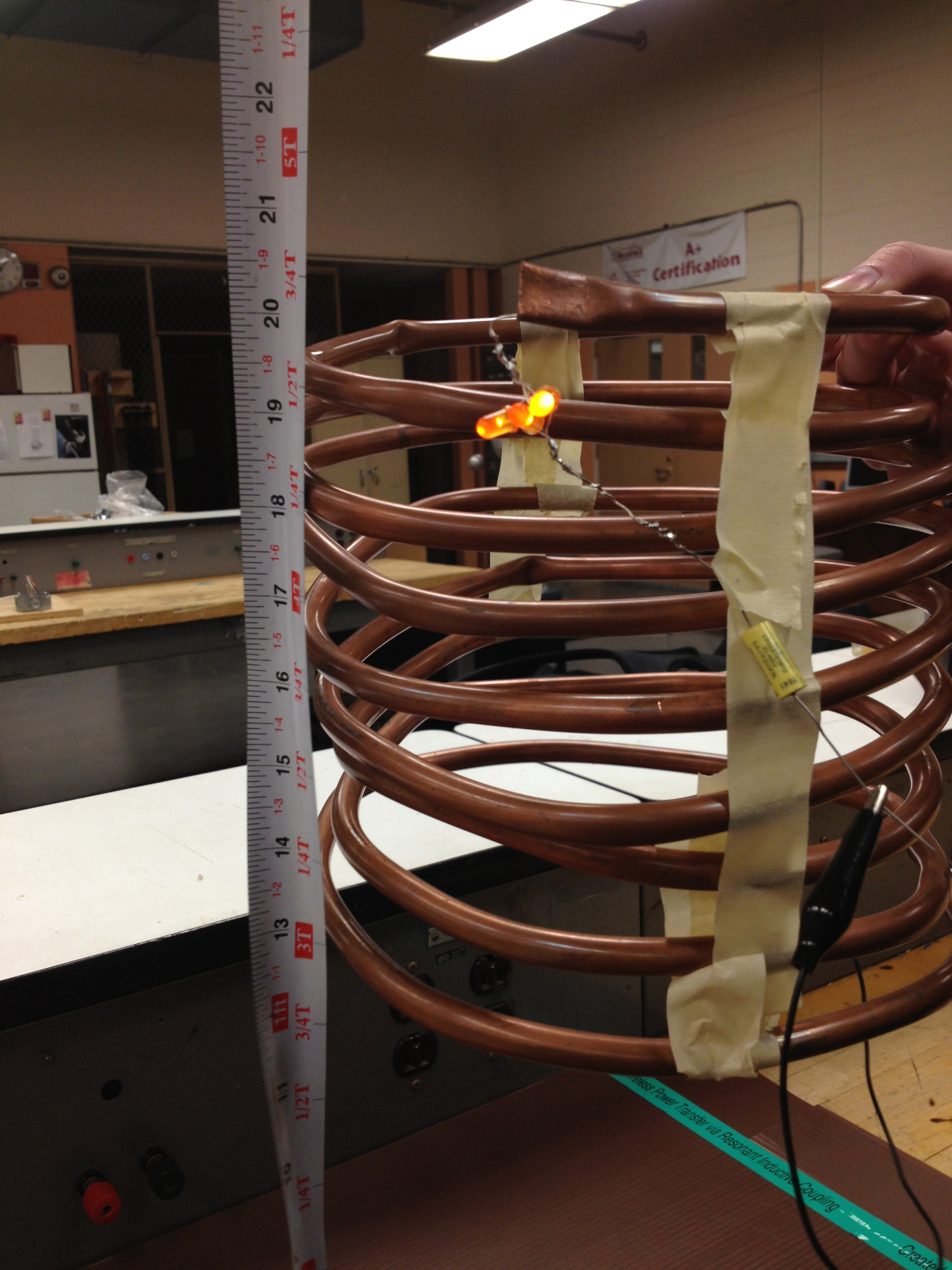
Example receiver coil. The coil is loaded with a capacitor and two LEDs. The coil and the capacitor form a series LC circuit which is tuned to a resonant frequency that matches the transmission coil located inside of the brown mat. Power is transmitted over a distance of 13 inches (33 cm).

To remove energy from the secondary coil, different methods can be used, the AC can be used directly or rectified and a regulator circuit can be used to generate DC voltage.

== See also ==
- Evanescent wave coupling
- Inductance
- Inductive charging
- Short-circuit inductance
- Wardenclyffe tower
- Wireless power transfer
