= Transformer types =

Types of electrical transformer

Circuit symbols
Transformer with two windings and iron core.
Transformer with three windings. The dots show the relative configuration of the windings.
Transformer with electrostatic screen preventing capacitive coupling between the windings.

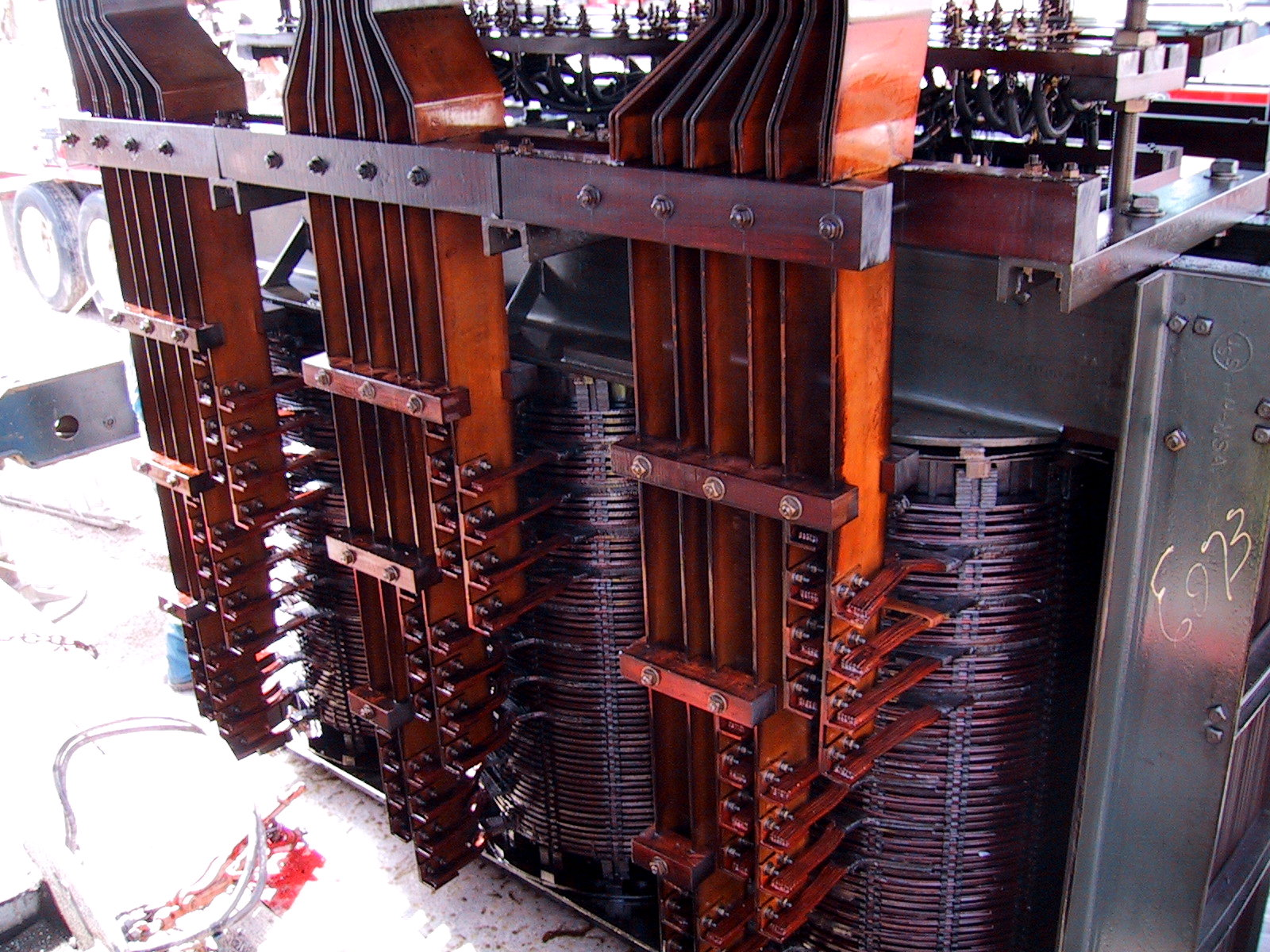
In an electric arc furnace, the transformer has a heavy copper bus for the low voltage winding, which can be rated for tens of thousands of amperes. Winding beginnings and ends are led out separately and "interleaved" for the external delta closure in a Knapsack connection. The transformers are immersed in oil for cooling and insulation, and are designed to withstand frequent short circuits.

Various types of electrical transformer are made for different purposes. Despite their design differences, the various types employ the same basic principle as discovered in 1831 by Michael Faraday, and share several key functional parts.

== Power transformer ==
=== Laminated core ===
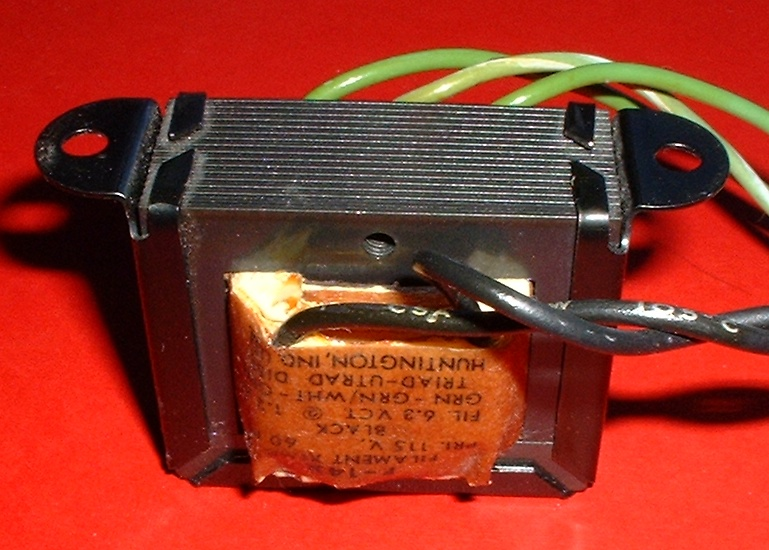
Laminated core transformer

This is the most common type of transformer, widely used in electric power transmission and appliances to convert mains voltage to low voltage to power electronic devices. They are available in power ratings ranging from mW to MW. The insulated laminations minimize eddy current losses in the iron core.

Small appliance and electronic transformers may use a split bobbin, giving a high level of insulation between the windings. The rectangular cores are made up of stampings, often in E-I shape pairs, but other shapes are sometimes used. Shields between primary and secondary may be fitted to reduce EMI (electromagnetic interference), or a screen winding is occasionally used.

Small appliance and electronics transformers may have a thermal cut-out built into the winding, to shut-off power at high temperatures to prevent further overheating.

=== Toroidal ===
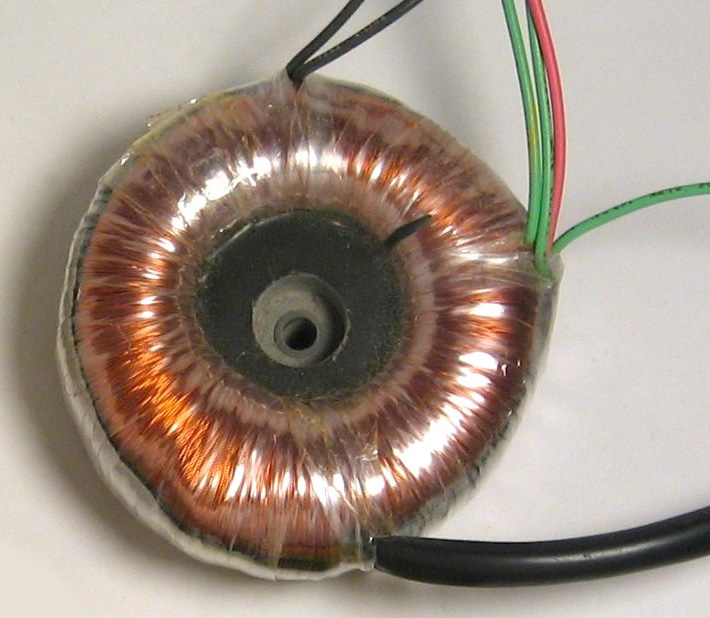
Toroidal transformer

Donut-shaped toroidal transformers save space compared to E-I cores, and may reduce external magnetic field. These use a ring shaped core, copper windings wrapped around this ring (and thus threaded through the ring during winding), and tape for insulation.

Toroidal transformers have a lower external magnetic field compared to rectangular transformers, and can be smaller for a given power rating. However, they cost more to make, as winding requires more complex and slower equipment.

They can be mounted by a bolt through the center, using washers and rubber pads or by potting in resin. Care must be taken that the bolt does not form part of a short-circuit turn.

=== Autotransformer ===
An autotransformer consists of only one winding that is tapped at some point along the winding. Voltage is applied across a terminal of the winding, and a higher (or lower) voltage is produced across another portion of the same winding. The equivalent power rating of the autotransformer is lower than the actual load power rating. It is calculated by: load VA × (|Vin – Vout|)/Vin. For example, an auto transformer that adapts a 1000 VA load rated at 120 volts to a 240 volt supply has an equivalent rating of at least: 1,000 VA (240 V – 120 V) / 240 V = 500 VA. However, the actual rating (shown on the tally plate) must be at least 1000 VA.

For voltage ratios that don't exceed about 3:1, an autotransformer is cheaper, lighter, smaller, and more efficient than an isolating (two-winding) transformer of the same rating. Large three-phase autotransformers are used in electric power distribution systems, for example, to interconnect 220 kV and 33 kV sub-transmission networks or other high voltage levels.

=== Variable autotransformer ===
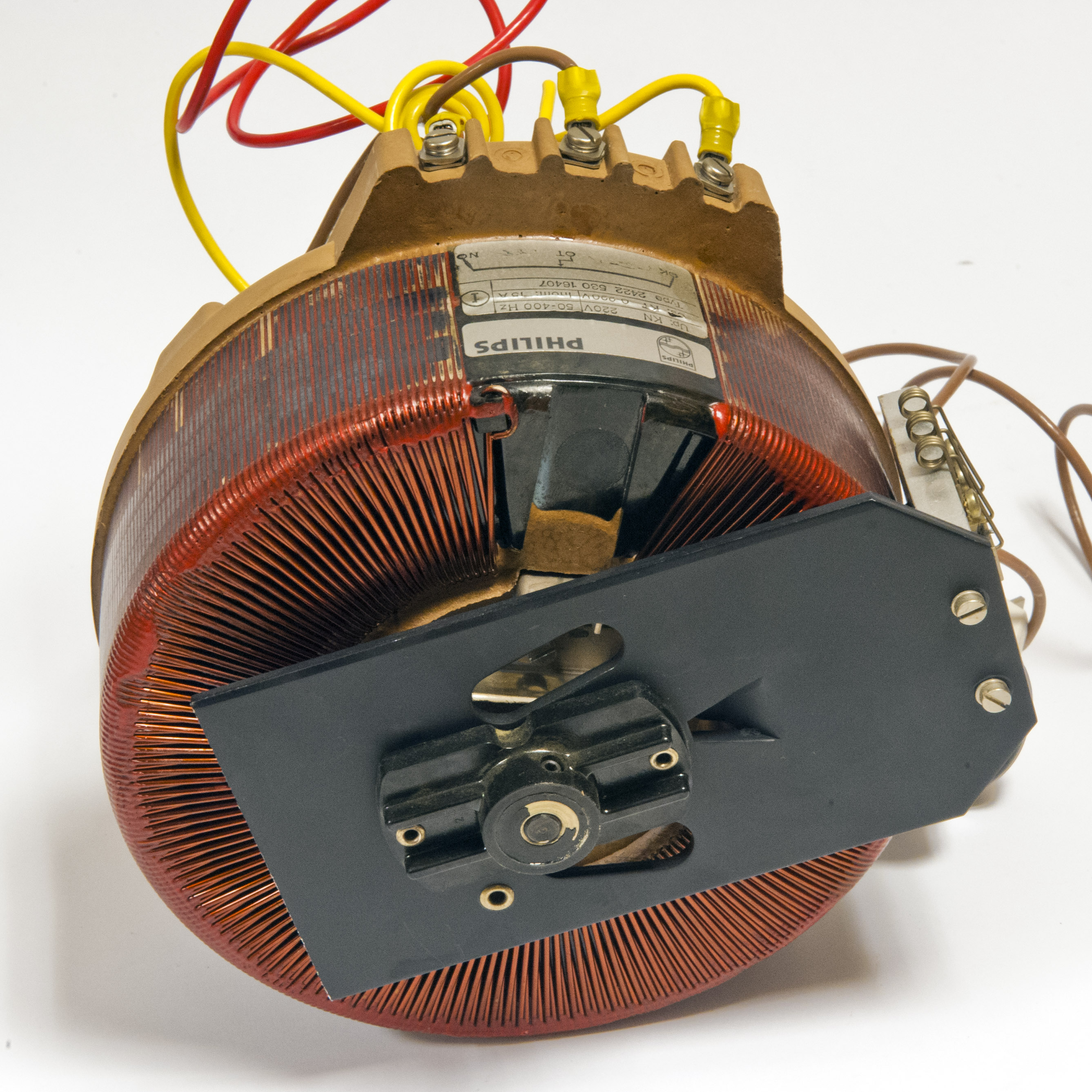
Variable autotransformer

By exposing part of the winding coils of an autotransformer, and making the secondary connection through a sliding carbon brush, an autotransformer with a near-continuously variable turns ratio can be obtained, allowing for wide voltage adjustment in very small increments.

=== Induction regulator ===
The induction regulator is similar in design to a wound-rotor induction motor but it is essentially a transformer whose output voltage is varied by rotating its secondary relative to the primary—i.e., rotating the angular position of the rotor. It can be seen as a power transformer exploiting rotating magnetic fields. The major advantage of the induction regulator is that unlike variacs, they are practical for transformers over 5 kVA. Hence, such regulators find widespread use in high-voltage laboratories.

=== Polyphase transformer ===
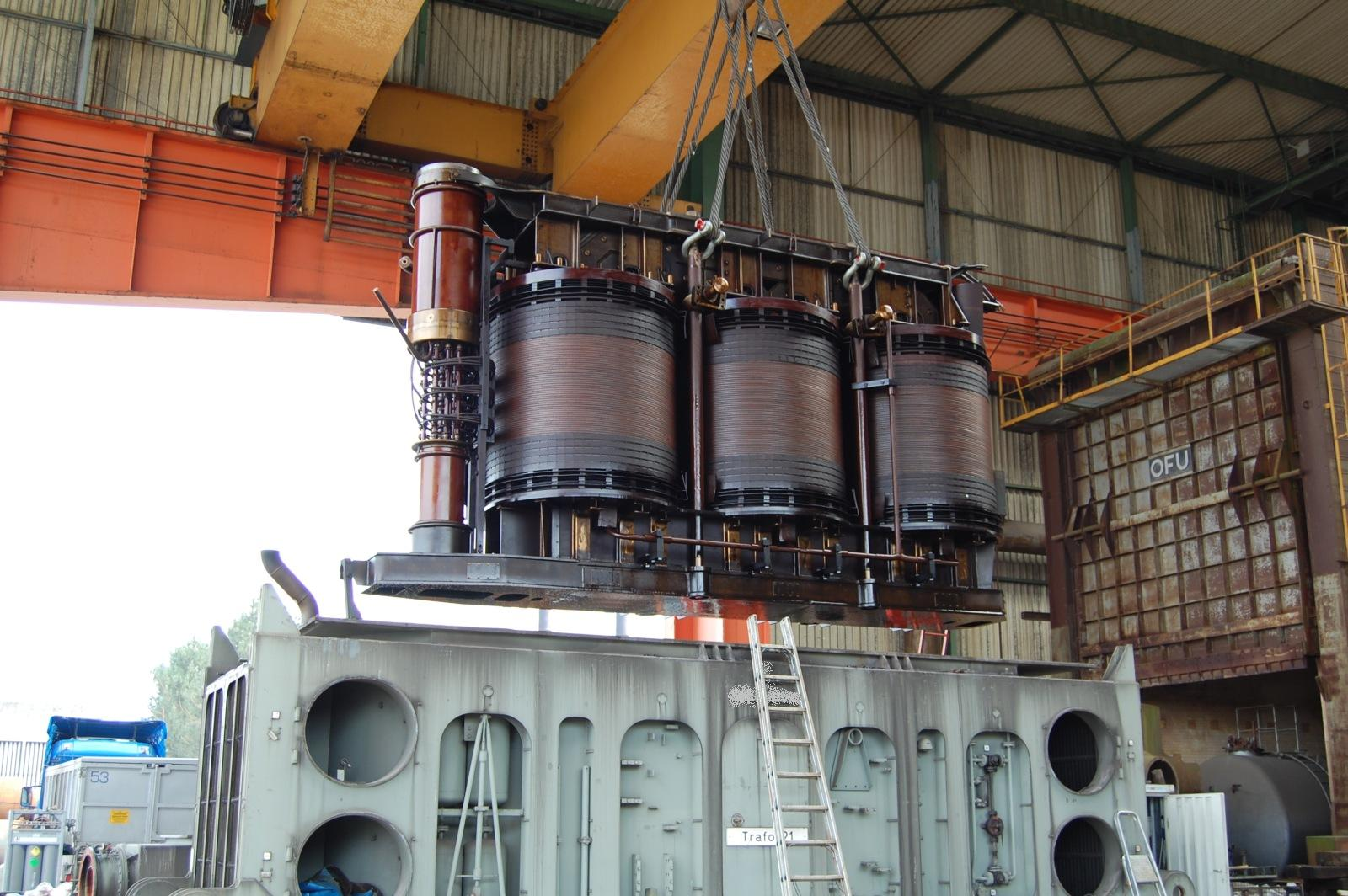
A high-voltage transformer being dismantled

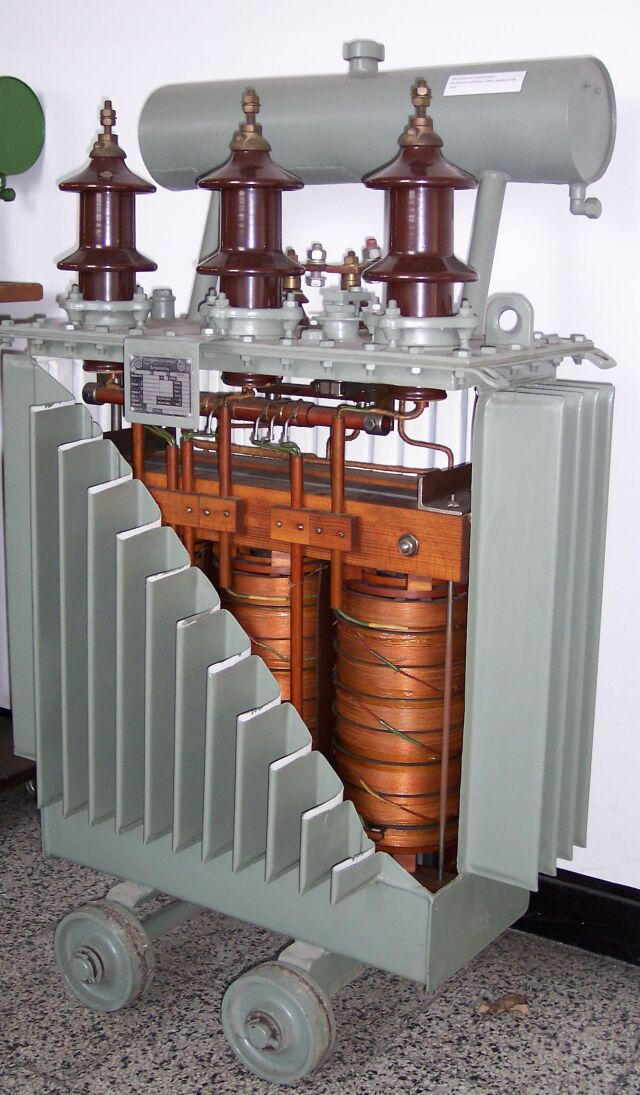
Cutaway view of a polyphase transformer

For polyphase systems, multiple single-phase transformers can be used, or all phases can be connected to a single polyphase transformer. For a three-phase transformer, the three primary windings are connected together and the three secondary windings are connected together. Examples of connections are wye-delta, delta-wye, delta-delta, and wye-wye. A vector group indicates the configuration of the windings and the phase angle difference between them. If a winding is connected to earth (grounded), the earth connection point is usually the center point of a wye winding. If the secondary is a delta winding, the ground may be connected to a center tap on one winding (high-leg delta) or one phase may be grounded (corner grounded delta). A special purpose polyphase transformer is the zigzag transformer. There are many possible configurations that may involve more or fewer than six windings and various tap connections.

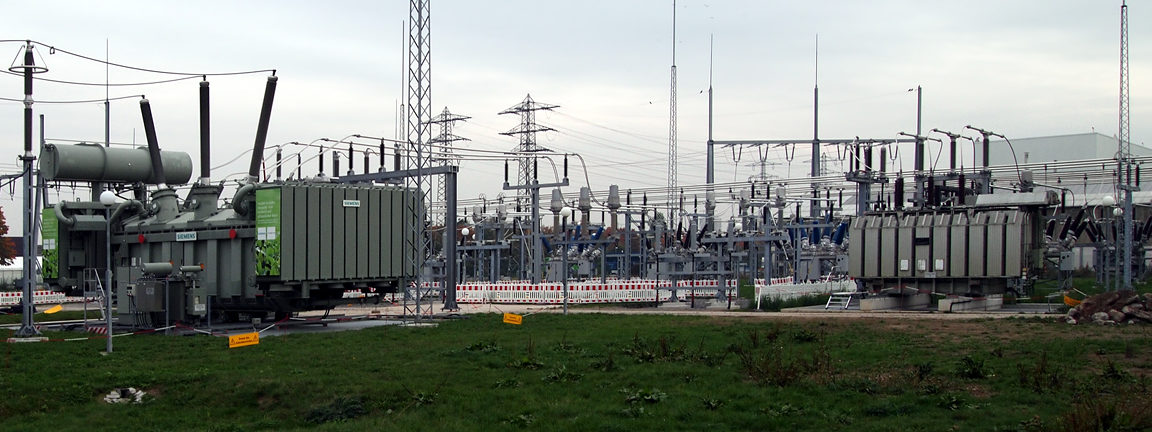
Three-phase transformers 380 kV/110 kV and 110 kV/20 kV

=== Grounding transformer ===
Grounding or earthing transformers let three wire (delta) polyphase system supplies accommodate phase to neutral loads by providing a return path for current to a neutral. Grounding transformers most commonly incorporate a single winding transformer with a zigzag winding configuration but may also be created with a wye-delta isolated winding transformer connection.

=== Phase-shifting transformer ===
This is a specialized type of transformer which can be configured to adjust the phase relationship between input and output. This allows power flow in an electric grid to be controlled, e.g. to steer power flows away from a shorter (but overloaded) link to a longer path with excess capacity.

=== Variable-frequency transformer ===
A variable-frequency transformer is a specialized three-phase power transformer which allows the phase relationship between the input and output windings to be continuously adjusted by rotating one half. They are used to interconnect electrical grids with the same nominal frequency but without synchronous phase coordination.

=== Leakage or stray field transformer ===
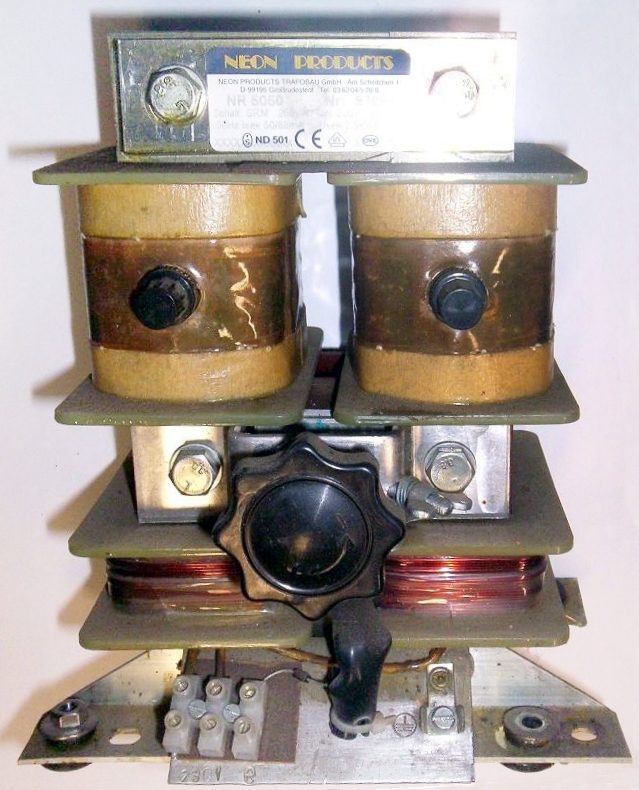
Leakage transformer

A leakage transformer, also called a stray-field transformer, has a significantly higher leakage inductance than other transformers, sometimes increased by a magnetic bypass or shunt in its core between primary and secondary, which is sometimes adjustable with a set screw. This provides a transformer with an inherent current limitation due to the loose coupling between its primary and the secondary windings. The adjustable short-circuit inductance acts as a current limiting parameter.

The output and input currents are kept low enough to preclude thermal overload under any load conditions — even if the secondary is shorted.

==== Uses ====
Leakage transformers are used for arc welding and high voltage discharge lamps (neon lights and cold-cathode fluorescent lamps, which are series connected up to 7.5 kV AC). It acts both as a voltage transformer and as a magnetic ballast.

Other applications are short-circuit-proof extra-low voltage transformers for toys or doorbell installations.

=== Resonant transformer ===
A resonant transformer is a transformer in which one or both windings has a capacitor across it and functions as a tuned circuit. Used at radio frequencies, resonant transformers can function as high Q factor bandpass filters. The transformer windings have either air or ferrite cores and the bandwidth can be adjusted by varying the coupling (mutual inductance). One common form is the IF (intermediate frequency) transformer, used in superheterodyne radio receivers. They are also used in radio transmitters.

Resonant transformers are also used in electronic ballasts for gas discharge lamps, and high voltage power supplies. They are also used in some types of switching power supplies. Here the short-circuit inductance value is an important parameter that determines the resonance frequency of the resonant transformer. Often only secondary winding has a resonant capacitor (or stray capacitance) and acts as a serial resonant tank circuit. When the short-circuit inductance of the secondary side of the transformer is L_{sc} and the resonant capacitor (or stray capacitance) of the secondary side is C_{r}, The resonance frequency ω_{s} of 1' is as follows

$$\omega_s=\frac{1}{\sqrt{L_{sc} C_r}}=\frac{1}{\sqrt{(1-k^2)L_s C_r}}$$

The transformer is driven by a pulse or square wave for efficiency, generated by an electronic oscillator circuit. Each pulse serves to drive resonant sinusoidal oscillations in the tuned winding, and due to resonance a high voltage can be developed across the secondary.

Applications:

- Intermediate frequency (IF) transformer in superheterodyne radio receiver
- Tank transformers in radio transmitters
- Tesla coil
- Power inverter
- Oudin coil (or Oudin resonator; named after its inventor Paul Oudin)
- D'Arsonval apparatus
- Ignition coil or induction coil used in the ignition system of a petrol engine
- Electrical breakdown and insulation testing of high voltage equipment and cables. In the latter case, the transformer's secondary is resonated with the cable's capacitance.

==== Constant voltage transformer ====
By arranging particular magnetic properties of a transformer core, and installing a ferro-resonant tank circuit (a capacitor and an additional winding), a transformer can be arranged to automatically keep the secondary winding voltage relatively constant for varying primary supply without additional circuitry or manual adjustment. Ferro-resonant transformers run hotter than standard power transformers, because regulating action depends on core saturation, which reduces efficiency. The output waveform is heavily distorted unless careful measures are taken to prevent this. Saturating transformers provide a simple rugged method to stabilize an AC power supply.

=== Ferrite core ===
Ferrite core power transformers are widely used in switched-mode power supplies (SMPSs). The powder core enables high-frequency operation, and hence much smaller size-to-power ratio than laminated-iron transformers.

Ferrite transformers are not used as power transformers at mains frequency since laminated iron cores cost less than an equivalent ferrite core.

==== Planar transformer ====
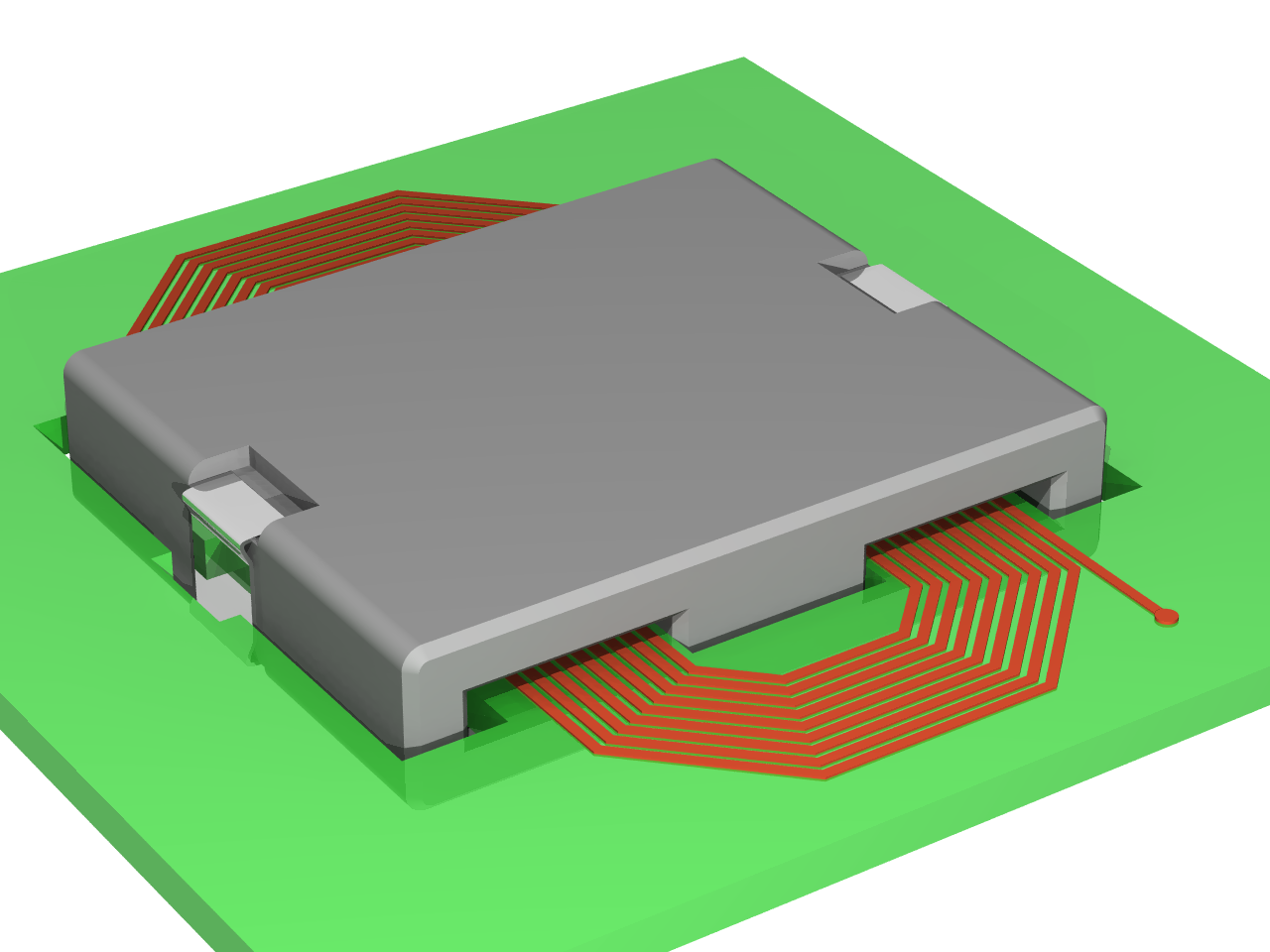
A planar transformer

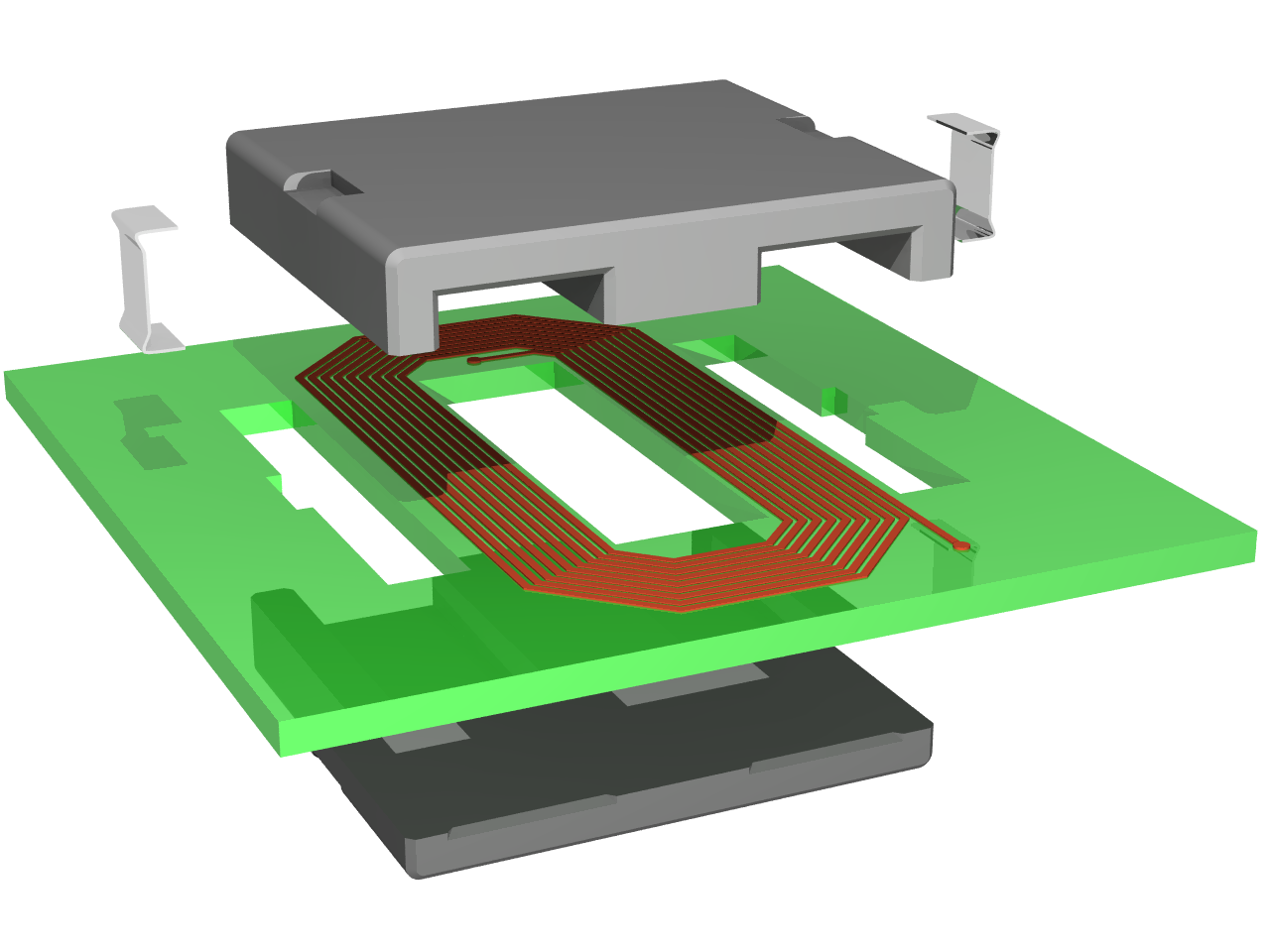
Exploded view: the spiral primary "winding" on one side of the PCB (the spiral secondary "winding" is on the other side of the PCB)

Manufacturers either use flat copper sheets or etch spiral patterns on a printed circuit board to form the "windings" of a planar transformer, replacing the turns of wire used to make other types. Some planar transformers are commercially sold as discrete components, other planar transformers are etched directly into the main printed circuit board and only need a ferrite core to be attached over the PCB. A planar transformer can be thinner than other transformers, which is useful for low-profile applications or when several printed circuit boards are stacked. Almost all planar transformers use a ferrite planar core.

=== Liquid-cooled transformer ===
Large transformers used in power distribution or electrical substations have their core and coils immersed in oil, which cools and insulates. Oil circulates through ducts in the coil and around the coil and core assembly, moved by convection. The oil is cooled by the outside of the tank in small ratings, and by an air-cooled radiator in larger ratings. Where a higher rating is required, or where the transformer is in a building or underground, oil pumps circulate the oil, fans may force air over the radiators, or an oil-to-water heat exchanger may also be used.

Transformer oil is flammable, so oil-filled transformers inside a building are installed in vaults to prevent spread of fire and smoke from a burning transformer. Some transformers were built to use fire-resistant PCBs, but because these compounds persist in the environment and have adverse effects on organisms, their use has been discontinued in most areas; for example, after 1979 in South Africa. Substitute fire-resistant liquids such as silicone oils are now used instead.

=== Cast resin transformer ===
Cast-resin power transformers encase the windings in epoxy resin. These transformers simplify installation since they are dry, without cooling oil, and so require no fire-proof vault for indoor installations. The epoxy protects the windings from dust and corrosive atmospheres. However, because the molds for casting the coils are only available in fixed sizes, the design of the transformers is less flexible, which may make them more costly if customized features (voltage, turns ratio, taps) are required.

=== Isolating transformer ===
An isolation transformer links two circuits magnetically, but provides no metallic conductive path between the circuits. An example application would be in the power supply for medical equipment, when it is necessary to prevent any leakage from the AC power system into devices connected to a patient. Special purpose isolation transformers may include shielding to prevent coupling of electromagnetic noise between circuits, or may have reinforced insulation to withstand thousands of volts of potential difference between primary and secondary circuits.

=== Solid-state transformer ===
A solid-state transformer is actually a power converter that performs the same function as a conventional transformer, sometimes with added functionality. Most contain a smaller high-frequency transformer. It can consist of an AC-to-AC converter, or a rectifier powering an inverter.

== Instrument transformer ==
Instrument transformers are typically used to operate instruments from high voltage lines or high current circuits, safely isolating measurement and control circuitry from the high voltages or currents. The primary winding of the transformer is connected to the high voltage or high current circuit, and the meter or relay is connected to the secondary circuit. Instrument transformers may also be used as isolation transformers so that secondary quantities may be used without affecting the primary circuitry.

Terminal identifications (either alphanumeric such as H_{1}, X_{1}, Y_{1}, etc. or a colored spot or dot impressed in the case) indicate one end of each winding, indicating the same instantaneous polarity and phase between windings. This applies to both types of instrument transformers. Correct identification of terminals and wiring is essential for proper operation of metering and protective relay instrumentation.

=== Current transformer ===
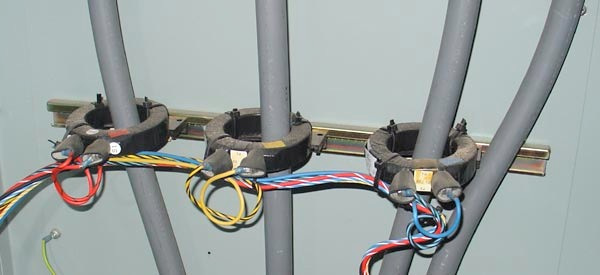
Current transformers used in metering equipment for three-phase 400 ampere electricity supply

A current transformer (CT) is a series connected measurement device designed to provide a current in its secondary coil proportional to the current flowing in its primary. Current transformers are commonly used in metering and protective relays in the electrical power industry.

Current transformers are often constructed by passing a single primary turn (either an insulated cable or an uninsulated bus bar) through a well-insulated toroidal core wrapped with many turns of wire. The CT is typically described by its current ratio from primary to secondary. For example, a 1000:1 CT provides an output current of 1 amperes when 1000 amperes flow through the primary winding. Standard secondary current ratings are 5 amperes or 1 ampere, compatible with standard measuring instruments. The secondary winding can be single ratio or have several tap points to provide a range of ratios. Care must be taken to make sure the secondary winding is not disconnected from its low-impedance load while current flows in the primary, as this may produce a dangerously high voltage across the open secondary and may permanently affect the accuracy of the transformer.

Specially constructed wideband CTs are also used, usually with an oscilloscope, to measure high frequency waveforms or pulsed currents within pulsed power systems. One type provides a voltage output that is proportional to the measured current. Another, called a Rogowski coil, requires an external integrator in order to provide a proportional output.

A current clamp uses a current transformer with a split core that can be easily wrapped around a conductor in a circuit. This is a common method used in portable current measuring instruments but permanent installations use more economical types of current transformer.

=== Voltage transformer or potential transformer ===
Voltage transformers (VT), also called potential transformers (PT), are a parallel connected type of instrument transformer, used for metering and protection in high-voltage circuits or phasor phase shift isolation. They are designed to present negligible load to the supply being measured and to have an accurate voltage ratio to enable accurate metering. A potential transformer may have several secondary windings on the same core as a primary winding, for use in different metering or protection circuits. The primary may be connected phase to ground or phase to phase. The secondary is usually grounded on one terminal.

There are three primary types of voltage transformers (VT): electromagnetic, capacitor, and optical. The electromagnetic voltage transformer is a wire-wound transformer. The capacitor voltage transformer uses a capacitance potential divider and is used at higher voltages due to a lower cost than an electromagnetic VT. An optical voltage transformer exploits the electrical properties of optical materials. Measurement of high voltages is possible by the potential transformers. An optical voltage transformer is not strictly a transformer, but a sensor similar to a Hall-effect sensor.

=== Combined instrument transformer ===
A combined instrument transformer encloses a current transformer and a voltage transformer in the same transformer. There are two main combined current and voltage transformer designs: oil-paper insulated and SF_{6} insulated. One advantage of applying this solution is reduced substation footprint, due to reduced number of transformers in a bay, supporting structures and connections as well as lower costs for civil works, transportation and installation.

== Pulse transformer ==
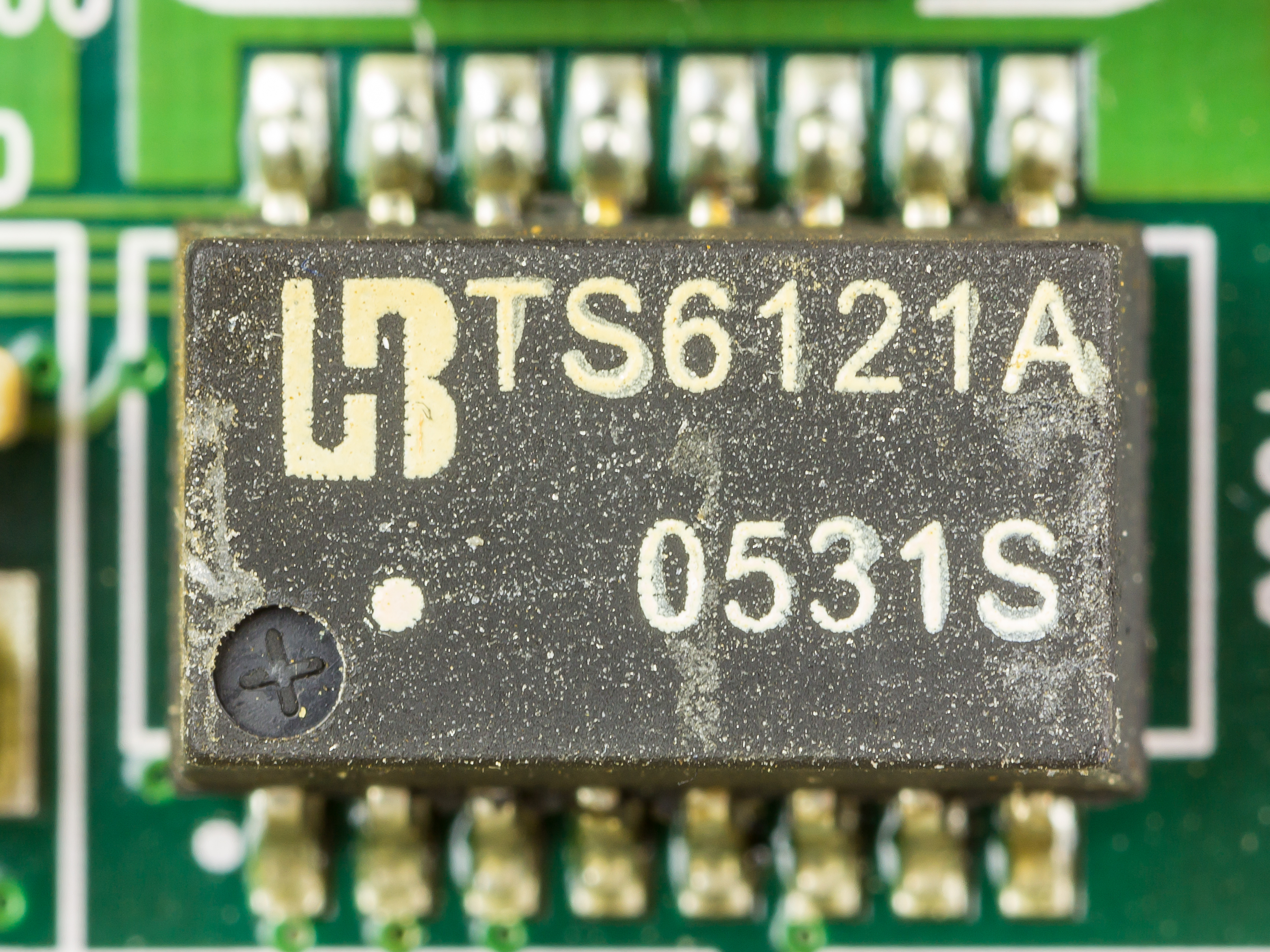
Bothhand TS6121A pulse transformer

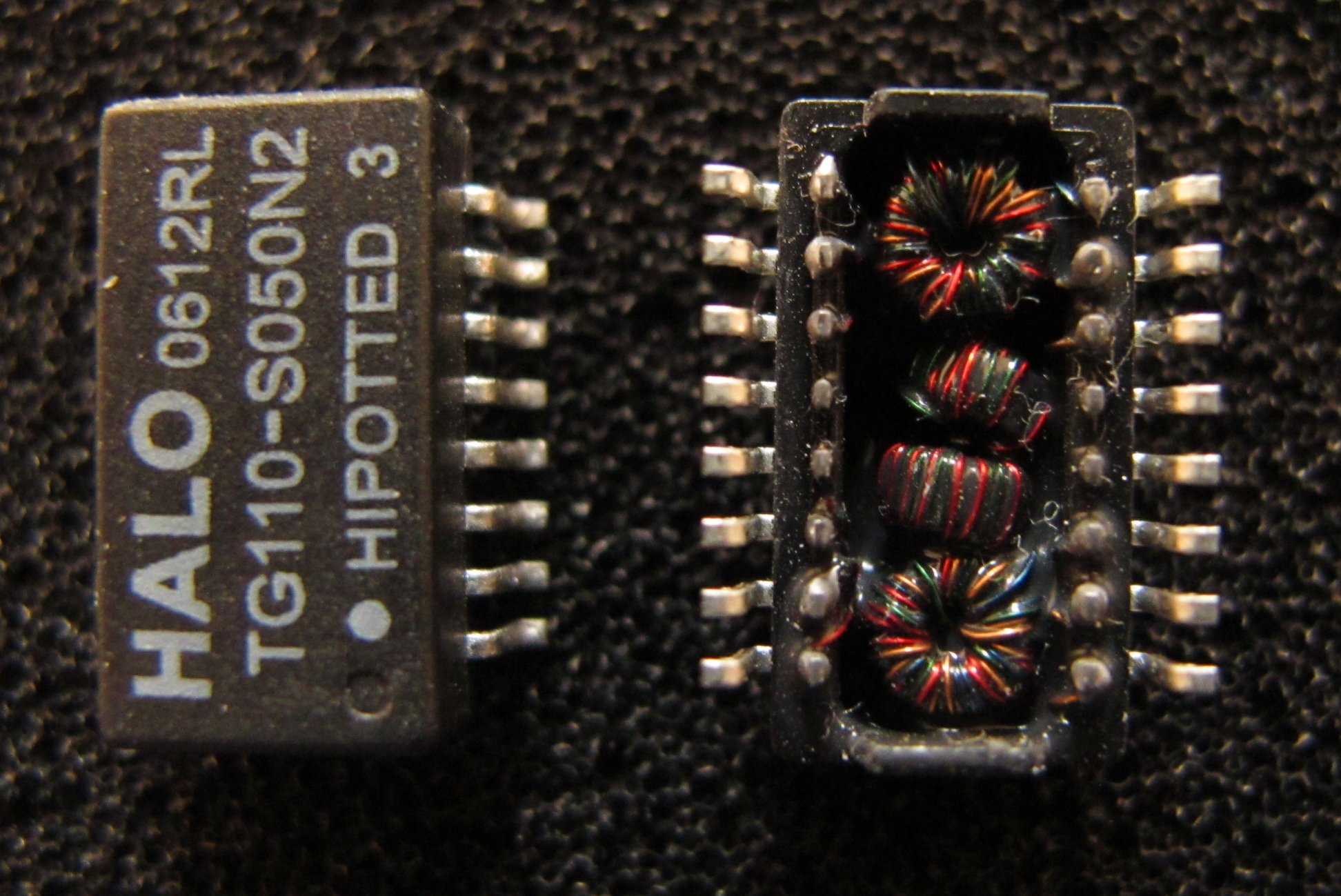
Inside an Ethernet transformer

A pulse transformer is a transformer that is optimised for transmitting rectangular electrical pulses (that is, pulses with fast rise and fall times and a relatively constant amplitude). Small versions called signal types are used in digital logic and telecommunications circuits such as in Ethernet, often for matching logic drivers to transmission lines. These are also called Ethernet transformer modules.

Medium-sized power versions are used in power-control circuits such as camera flash controllers. Larger power versions are used in the electrical power distribution industry to interface low-voltage control circuitry to the high-voltage gates of power semiconductors. Special high voltage pulse transformers are also used to generate high power pulses for radar, particle accelerators, or other high energy pulsed power applications.

To minimize distortion of the pulse shape, a pulse transformer needs to have low values of leakage inductance and distributed capacitance, and a high open-circuit inductance. In power-type pulse transformers, a low coupling capacitance (between the primary and secondary) is important to protect the circuitry on the primary side from high-powered transients created by the load. For the same reason, high insulation resistance and high breakdown voltage are required. A good transient response is necessary to maintain the rectangular pulse shape at the secondary, because a pulse with slow edges would create switching losses in the power semiconductors.

The product of the peak pulse voltage and the duration of the pulse (or more accurately, the voltage-time integral) is often used to characterise pulse transformers. Generally speaking, the larger this product, the larger and more expensive the transformer.

Pulse transformers by definition have a duty cycle of less than 1/2; whatever energy stored in the coil during the pulse must be "dumped" out before the pulse is fired again.

== RF transformer ==
There are several types of transformer used in radio frequency (RF) work, distinguished by how their windings are connected, and by the type of cores (if any) the coil turns are wound onto.

Laminated steel used for power transformer cores is very inefficient at RF, wasting a lot of RF power as heat, so transformers for use at radio frequencies tends to use magnetic ceramics for winding cores, such as powdered iron (for mediumwave and lower shortwave frequencies) or ferrite (for upper shortwave). The core material a coil is wrapped around can increase its inductance dramatically – hundreds to thousands of times more than “air” – thereby raising the transformer's Q. The cores of such transformers tend to help performance the most at the lower end of the frequency band transformer was designed for.

Old RF transformers sometimes included an extra, third coil (called a tickler winding) to inject feedback into an earlier (detector) stage in antique regenerative radio receivers.

=== Air-core transformer ===
So-called “air-core” transformers actually have no core at all – they are wound onto non-magnetic forms or frames, or merely held in shape by the stiffness of the coiled wire. These are used for very high frequency and upper shortwave work.

The lack of a magnetically reactive core means very low inductance per turn, requiring many turns of wire on the transformer coil. All forward current excites reverse current and induces secondary voltage which is proportional to the mutual inductance. At VHF, such transformers may be nothing more than a few turns of wire soldered onto a printed circuit board.

=== Ferrite-core transformer ===
Ferrite core transformers are widely used in RF transformers, especially for current balancing (see below) and impedance matching for TV and radio antennas. Because of the enormous improvement in inductance that ferrite produces, many ferrite cored transformers work well with only one or two turns.

Ferrite is an intensely magnetically reactive ceramic material made from iron oxide (rust) mixed with small fractions of other metals or their oxides, such as magnesium, zinc, and nickel. Different mixtures respond best at different frequencies. Because they are ceramics, ferrites are (almost) non-conductive, so they respond only to the magnetic fields created by nearby currents, and not to the electric fields created by the accompanying voltages.

=== Choke transformer ===
For radio frequency use, "choke" transformers are sometimes made from windings of transmission line wired in parallel. Sometimes the windings are coaxial cable, sometimes bifilar (paired parallel wire); either is wound around a ferrite, powdered iron, or "air" core. This style of transformer gives an extremely wide bandwidth but only a limited number of impedance ratios (such as 1:1, 1:4, or 1:9) can be achieved with this technique.

Choke transformers are sometimes called transmission-line transformers (although see below for a different transformer type with the same name), or Guanella transformers, or current baluns, or line isolators. Although called a "transmission line" transformer, it is distinct from the transformers made from segments of transmission line.

- The name "transmission-line" is used because actual coaxial line is sometimes used, and when paired wires are used, the builder is expected to take special care with the wire spacing, to ensure that the transmission line impedance of the coax or paired wires lies near the geometric mean of the input and output impedances.
- The name "choke" is used because the equal and opposite (anti-parallel, balanced) currents in the coax or paired wires cancel each others' magnetic fields, allowing them to pass through unhindered, but magnetic field of the unbalanced flow inhibits the unbalanced current, "choking" it off. Similar reasoning applies to the name "line isolator".
- It is called a "current balun" or "current transformer" because the transformed flow produces balanced currents, rather than balanced voltages typical of other transformer types.

=== Line section transformer ===
At radio frequencies and microwave frequencies, a quarter-wave impedance transformer can provide impedance matching between circuits over a limited range of frequencies, using only a section of transmission line no more than a 1 /4 wave long. The line may be coaxial cable, waveguide, stripline, or microstrip. For upper VHF and UHF frequencies, where coil self resonance interferes with proper operation, it is usually the only feasible method for transforming line impedances.

Single frequency transformers are made using sections of transmission line, often called a "matching section" or a "matching stub". Like the choke transformer above, it is also called a "transmission line transformer" even though the two are very different in form and operation.

Unless it is terminated in its characteristic impedance, any transmission line will produce standing waves of impedance along its length, repeating exactly every full wavelength, and covering its full range of absolute values over only a quarter wave. One may exploit this behavior to transform currents and voltages by connecting sections of transmission line with mismatched impedances to deliberately create a standing wave on a line, and the cut and reconnect to the line at the position where a desired impedance is reached – never requiring more than a 1 /4 wave of mismatched line.

This type of transformer is very efficient (very little loss) but severely limited in the frequency span it will operate on: Whereas the choke transformer, above, is very broadbanded, a line section transformer is very narrowbanded.

=== Balun ===
"Balun" is a generic name for any transformer configured specifically to connect between balanced (non-grounded) and unbalanced (grounded) circuits. They can be made using any transformer type, but the actual balance achieved depends on the type; for example, "choke" baluns produce balanced current and autotransformer-type baluns produce balanced voltages. Baluns can also be made from configurations of transmission line, using bifilar or coaxial cable similar to transmission line transformers in construction and operation.

In addition to interfacing between balanced and unbalanced loads by producing balanced current or balanced voltage (or both), baluns can in addition separately transform (match) impedance between the loads.

== IF transformer ==
Ferrite-core transformers are widely used in (intermediate frequency) (IF) stages in superheterodyne radio receivers. They are mostly tuned transformers, containing a threaded ferrite slug that is screwed in or out to adjust IF tuning. The transformers are usually canned (shielded) for stability and to reduce interference.

== Audio transformer ==
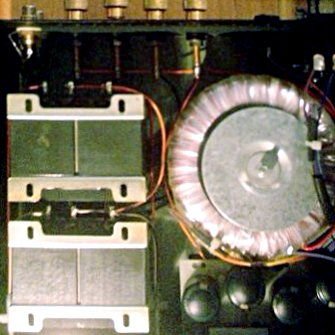
Two speaker-level audio transformers in a tube amplifier are seen on the left. The power supply toroidal transformer is on right

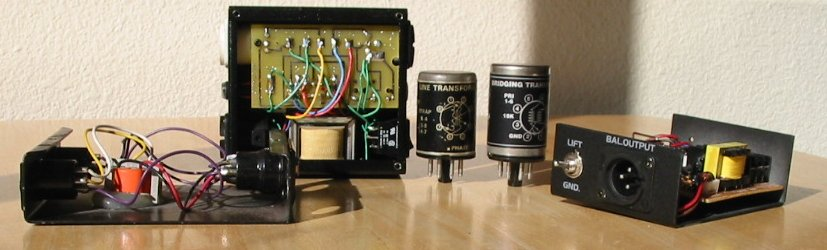
Five audio transformers for various line level purposes. The two black boxes on the left contain 1:1 transformers for splitting signals, balancing unbalanced signals, or isolating two different AC ground systems to eliminate buzz and hum. The two cylindrical metal cases fit into octal sockets; each one contains a 1:1 line transformer, the first is rated at 60 ohms, the second is rated at 15,000 ohms. On the far right is a DI unit; its 12:1 transformer (with yellow insulation) changes a high impedance unbalanced input to a low impedance balanced output.

Audio transformers are those specifically designed for use in audio circuits to carry audio signal. They can be used to block radio frequency interference or the DC component of an audio signal, to split or combine audio signals, or to provide impedance matching between high impedance and low impedance circuits, such as between a high impedance tube (valve) amplifier output and a low impedance loudspeaker, or between a high impedance instrument output and the low impedance input of a mixing console. Audio transformers that operate with loudspeaker voltages and current are larger than those that operate at microphone or line level, which carry much less power. Bridge transformers connect 2-wire and 4-wire communication circuits.

Being magnetic devices, audio transformers are susceptible to external magnetic fields such as those generated by AC current-carrying conductors. "Hum" is a term commonly used to describe unwanted signals originating from the "mains" power supply (typically 50 or 60 Hz). Audio transformers used for low-level signals, such as those from microphones, often include magnetic shielding to protect against extraneous magnetically coupled signals.

Audio transformers were originally designed to connect different telephone systems to one another while keeping their respective power supplies isolated, and are still commonly used to interconnect professional audio systems or system components, to eliminate buzz and hum. Such transformers typically have a 1:1 ratio between the primary and the secondary. These can also be used for splitting signals, balancing unbalanced signals, or feeding a balanced signal to unbalanced equipment. Transformers are also used in DI boxes to convert high-impedance instrument signals (e.g., bass guitar) to low impedance signals to enable them to connect to a microphone input on the mixing console.

A particularly critical component is the output transformer of a valve amplifier. Valve circuits for quality reproduction have long been produced with no other (inter-stage) audio transformers, but an output transformer is needed to couple the relatively high impedance (up to a few hundred ohms depending upon configuration) of the output valve(s) to the low impedance of a loudspeaker. (The valves can deliver a low current at a high voltage; the speakers require high current at low voltage.) Most solid-state power amplifiers need no output transformer at all.

Audio transformers affect the sound quality because they are non-linear. They add harmonic distortion to the original signal, especially odd-order harmonics, with an emphasis on third-order harmonics. When the incoming signal amplitude is very low there is not enough level to energize the magnetic core (see coercivity and magnetic hysteresis). When the incoming signal amplitude is very high the transformer saturates and adds harmonics from soft clipping. Another non-linearity comes from limited frequency response. For good low-frequency response a relatively large magnetic core is required; high power handling increases the required core size. Good high-frequency response requires carefully designed and implemented windings without excessive leakage inductance or stray capacitance. All this makes for an expensive component.

Early transistor audio power amplifiers often had output transformers, but they were eliminated as advances in semiconductors allowed the design of amplifiers with sufficiently low output impedance to drive a loudspeaker directly.

=== Loudspeaker transformer ===
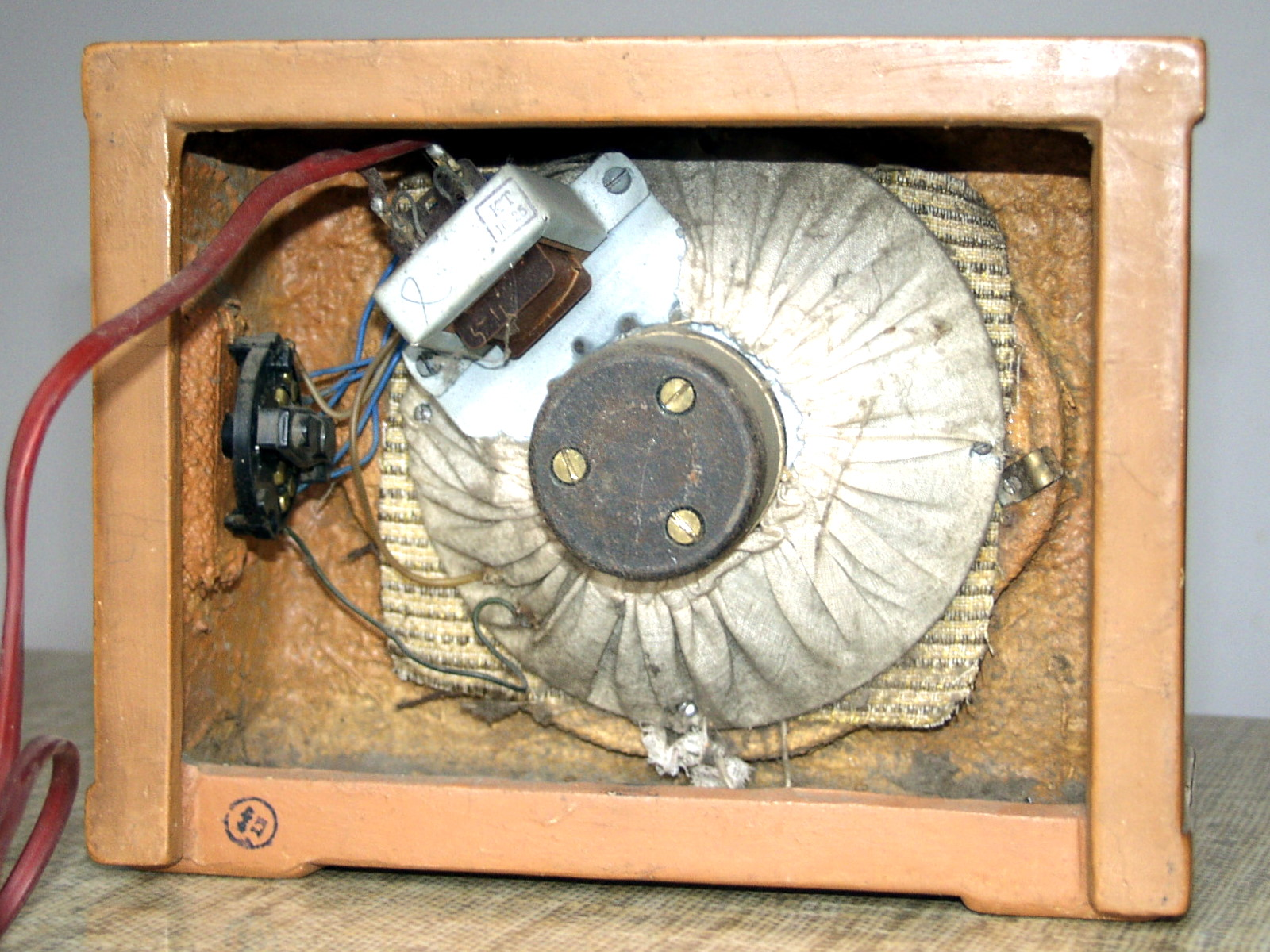
Loudspeaker transformer in old radio

In the same way that transformers create high voltage power transmission circuits that minimize transmission losses, loudspeaker transformers can power many individual loudspeakers from a single audio circuit operated at higher than normal loudspeaker voltages. This application is common in public address applications. Such circuits are commonly referred to as constant-voltage speaker systems. Such systems are also known by the nominal voltage of the loudspeaker line, such as 25-, 70- and 100-volt speaker systems (the voltage corresponding to the power rating of a speaker or amplifier). A transformer steps up the output of the system's amplifier to the distribution voltage. At the distant loudspeaker locations, a step-down transformer matches the speaker to the rated voltage of the line, so the speaker produces rated nominal output when the line is at nominal voltage. Loudspeaker transformers commonly have multiple primary taps to adjust the volume at each speaker in steps.

=== Output transformer ===
Valve (tube) amplifiers almost always use an output transformer to match the high load impedance requirement of the valves (several kilohms) to a low impedance speaker

=== Small-signal transformer ===
Moving coil phonograph cartridges produce a very small voltage. A transformer may be used to convert the voltage to the range of the more common moving-magnet cartridges.

Microphones may also be matched to their load with a small transformer that is shielded with mu-metal to minimise noise pickup.

=== Interstage and coupling transformer ===
In a push–pull amplifier, an inverted signal is required and can be obtained from a transformer with a center-tapped winding, used to drive two active devices in opposite phase. These phase splitting transformers are not much used today.

== Other types ==
=== Transactor ===
A transactor is a combination of a transformer and a reactor. A transactor has an iron core with an air-gap, which limits the coupling between windings.

=== Hedgehog ===
Hedgehog transformers are occasionally encountered in homemade 1920s radios. They are homemade audio interstage coupling transformers.

Enameled copper wire is wound round the central half of the length of a bundle of insulated iron wire (e.g., florists' wire), to make the windings. The ends of the iron wires are then bent around the electrical winding to complete the magnetic circuit, and the whole is wrapped with tape or string to hold it together.

=== Variometer and variocoupler ===
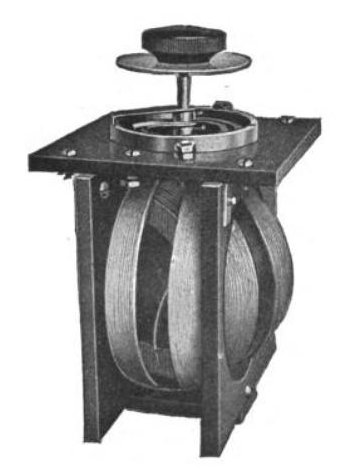
Variometer used in 1920s radio receiver

A variometer is a type of continuously variable air-core RF inductor with two windings. One common form consisted of a coil wound on a short hollow cylindrical form, with a second smaller coil inside, mounted on a shaft so its magnetic axis can be rotated with respect to the outer coil. The two coils are connected in series. When the two coils are collinear, with their magnetic fields pointed in the same direction, the two magnetic fields add, and the inductance is maximum. If the inner coil is rotated so its axis is at an angle to the outer coil, the magnetic fields do not add and the inductance is less. If the inner coil is rotated so it is collinear with the outer coil but their magnetic fields point in opposite directions, the fields cancel each other out and the inductance is very small or zero. The advantage of the variometer is that inductance can be adjusted continuously, over a wide range. Variometers were widely used in 1920s radio receivers. One of their main uses today is as antenna matching coils to match longwave radio transmitters to their antennas.

The vario-coupler was a device with similar construction, but the two coils were not connected but attached to separate circuits. So it functioned as an air-core RF transformer with variable coupling. The inner coil could be rotated from 0° to 90° angle with the outer, reducing the mutual inductance from maximum to near zero.

The pancake coil variometer was another common construction used in both 1920s receivers and transmitters. It consists of two flat spiral coils suspended vertically facing each other, hinged at one side so one could swing away from the other to an angle of 90° to reduce the coupling. The flat spiral design served to reduce parasitic capacitance and losses at radio frequencies.

Pancake or "honeycomb" coil vario-couplers were used in the 1920s in the common Armstrong or "tickler" regenerative radio receivers. One coil was connected to the detector tube's grid circuit. The other coil, the "tickler" coil was connected to the tube's plate (output) circuit. It fed back some of the signal from the plate circuit into the input again, and this positive feedback increased the tube's gain and selectivity.

=== Rotary transformer ===
A rotary (rotatory) transformer is a specialized transformer that couples electrical signals between two parts that rotate in relation to each other—as an alternative to slip rings, which are prone to wear and contact noise. They are commonly used in helical scan magnetic tape applications.

=== Variable differential transformer ===
A variable differential transformer is a rugged non-contact position sensor. It has two oppositely-phased primaries which nominally produce zero output in the secondary, but any movement of the core changes the coupling to produce a signal.

=== Resolver and synchro ===
The two-phase resolver and related three-phase synchro are rotary position sensors which work over a full 360°. The primary is rotated within two or three secondaries at different angles, and the amplitudes of the secondary signals can be decoded into an angle. Unlike variable differential transformers, the coils, and not just the core, move relative to each other, so slip rings are required to connect the primary.

Resolvers produce in-phase and quadrature components which are useful for computation. Synchros produce three-phase signals which can be connected to other synchros to rotate them in a generator/motor configuration.

=== Piezoelectric transformer ===
Two piezoelectric transducers can be mechanically coupled or integrated in one piece of material, creating a piezoelectric transformer.

=== Flyback ===
A flyback transformer high-frequency transformer used in a flyback circuit, such as found in plasma balls and cathode-ray tube (CRT) power supplies. Flyback transformers may contain multiple secondary windings to provide several other voltages.

== See also ==
- Buck–boost transformer – Voltage adjustment device in computers
- Center tap – Contact made to a point halfway along a winding of a transformer or inductor
- Magnetic amplifier – Electromagnetic device
- Motor–generator – Device for converting electrical power to another form
- Saturable reactor – Type of variable reactance inductor
- Tap changer – Mechanism to change turn ratios in transformers
- Three-phase electric power – Form of alternating current
- Transformer – Device to couple energy between circuits
