= Automotive industry in India =

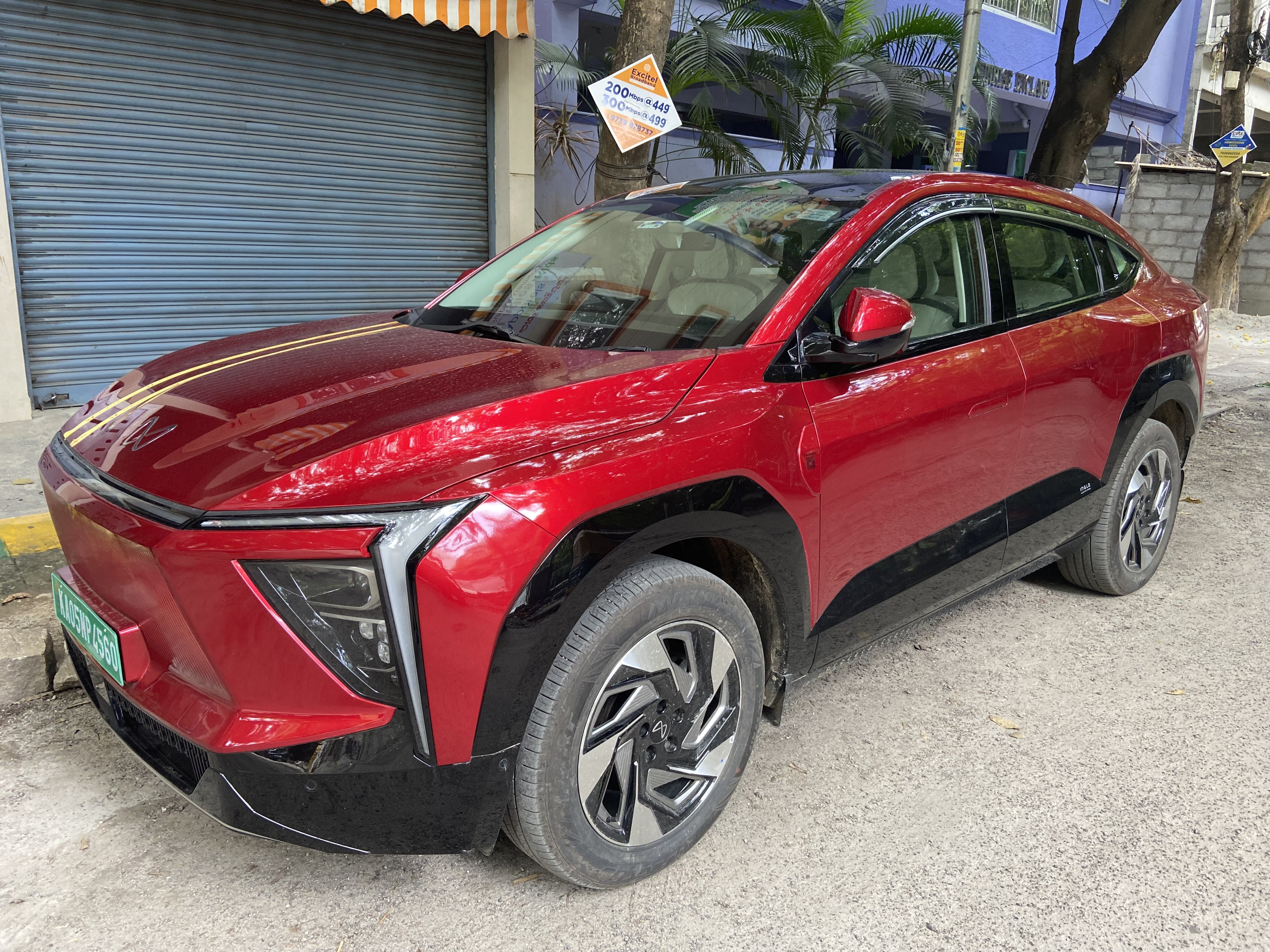
Mahindra XEV 9e, a current flagship EV of Mahindra

The automotive industry in India in 2025 is the world's third-largest by annual production worth US$250 billion, behind the United States (US$880 billion) and China (US$530 billion). The growth of automotive industry in India is fueled by the country's GDP growth (world's 3rd largest in PPP and 4th largest nominally) and rapid highway construction. In 2022, the industry accounted for 8% of the country's total exports and 7.1% of overall GDP.

According to a 2021 National Family Health Survey, only 8% of Indian households own a car, while 54% own motorcycles or scooters. In 2025, India had 44 cars per 1,000 people, markedly lower than in other major economies.

== History ==
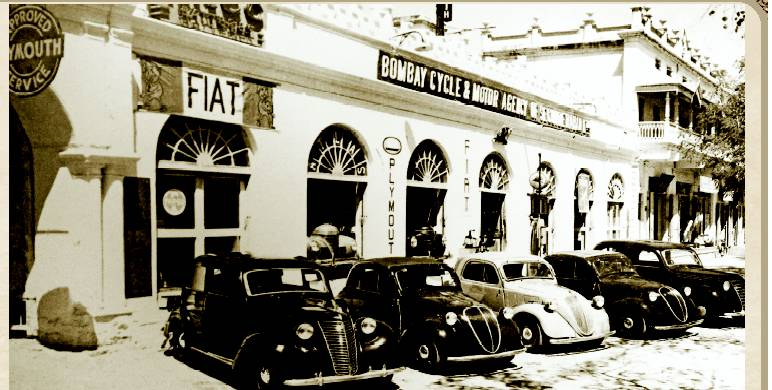
A pre-Independence car showroom in Secunderabad, showing Fiat Topolino and Fiat 1100

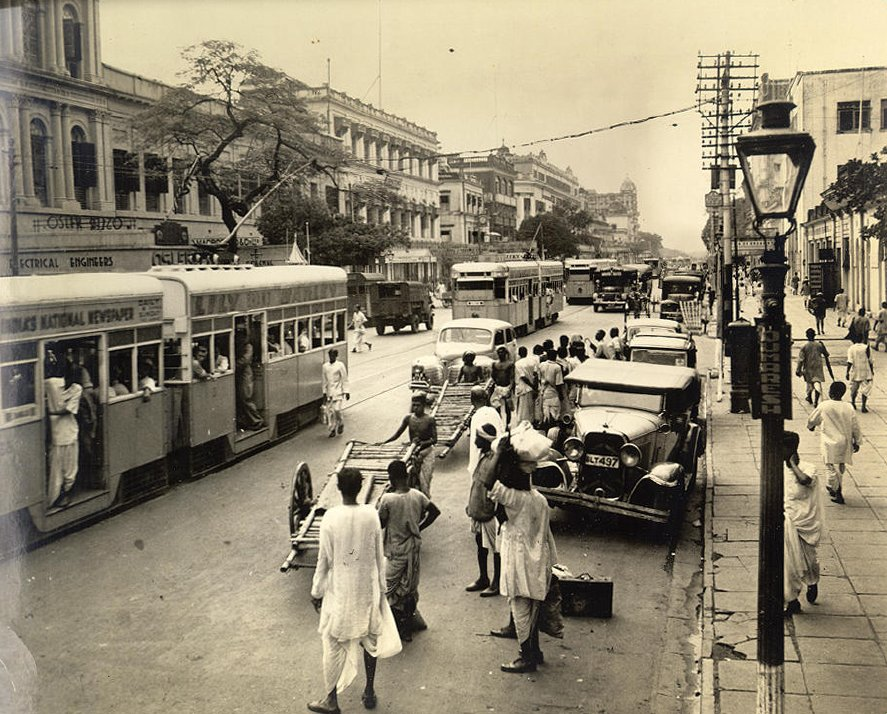
Kolkata street traffic in 1945

In 1897, the first car ran on an Indian road. Through the 1930s, cars were imports only, and in small numbers.

An embryonic automotive industry emerged in India in the 1940s. Hindustan Motors was launched in 1942 building Morris products, long-time competitor Premier in 1944, building Chrysler Corporation products such as Dodge and Plymouth, and beginning in the 1960s, Fiat products. Mahindra & Mahindra was established by two brothers in 1945 and began assembly of Jeep CJ-3A utility vehicles. In the same years, J. R. D. Tata, the chairman of Tata Group founded TATA Engineering and Locomotive Company (now Tata Motors) in Jamshedpur. Following independence in 1947, the Government of India and the private sector launched efforts to create an automotive-component manufacturing industry to supply to the automobile industry. In 1953, an import substitution programme was launched, and the import of fully built-up cars began to be restricted.

=== 1947–1970 ===
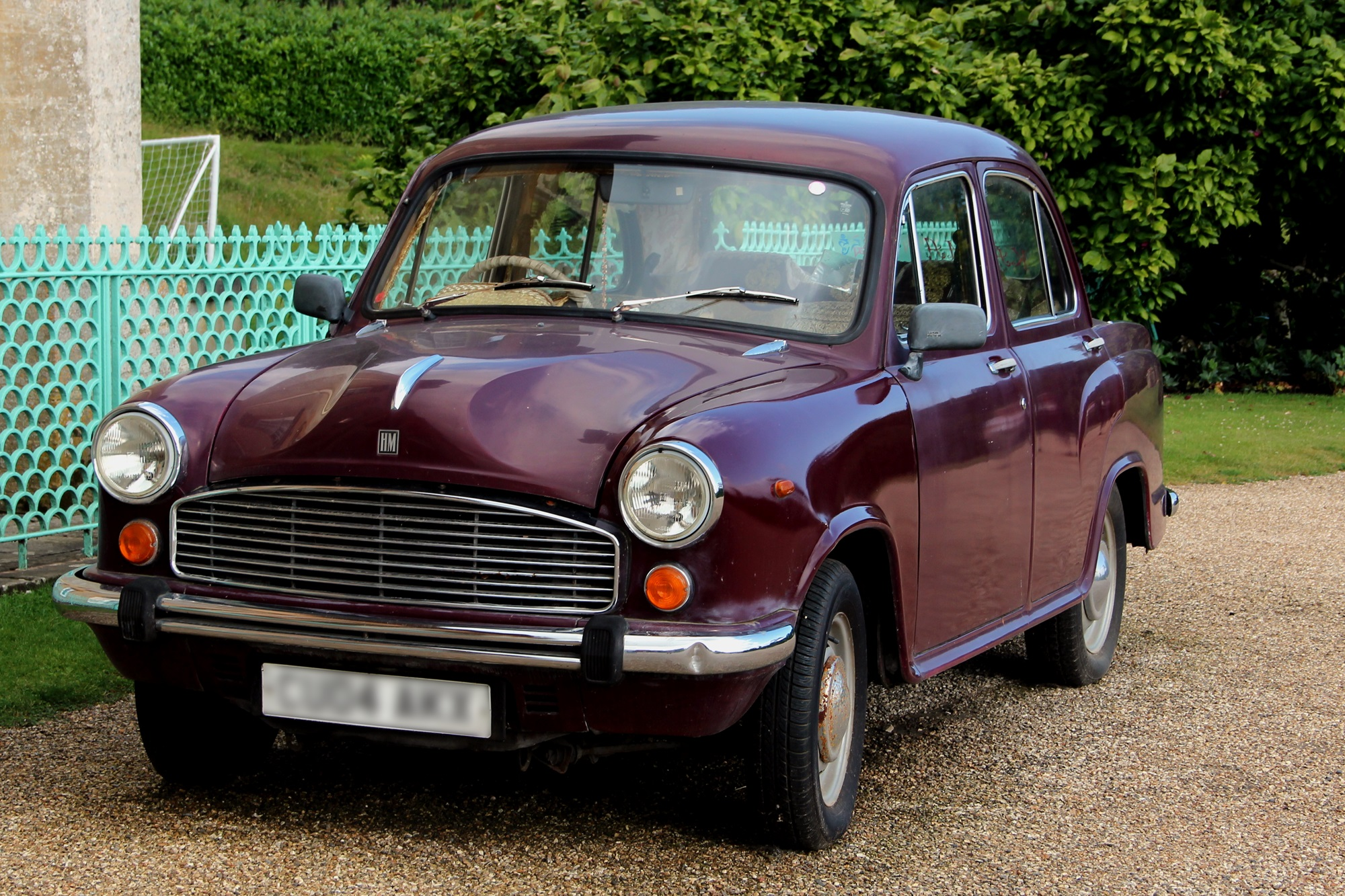
The Hindustan Ambassador dominated India's automotive market from the 1960s until the mid-1980s and was manufactured until 2014.

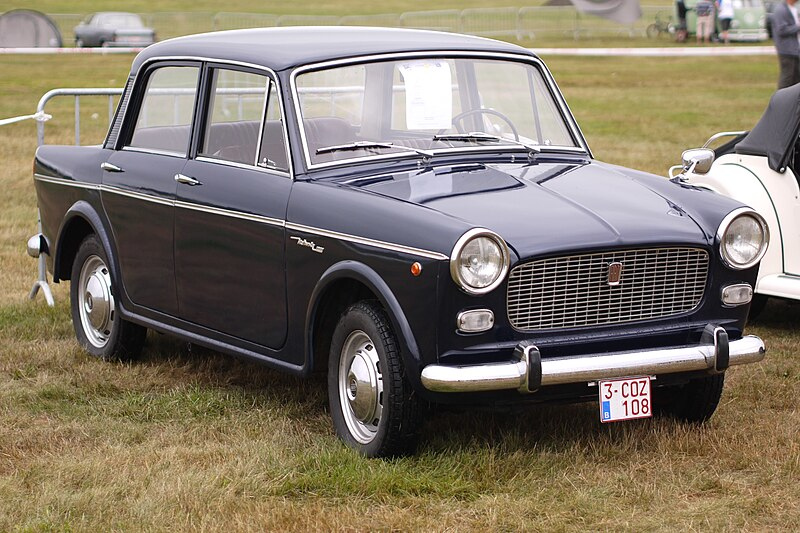
Fiat 1100D, built under license by Premier Automobiles Limited (PAL), later re-christened 'Premier Padmini', was the Ambassador's only true competitor.

==== The 1952 Tariff Commission ====
In 1952, the Indian government appointed the first Tariff Commission, whose purpose was to come out with a feasibility plan for the indigenization of the Indian automobile industry. In 1953, the commission submitted its report, which recommended categorizing existing Indian car companies according to their manufacturing infrastructure, under a licensed capacity to manufacture a certain number of vehicles, with capacity increases allowable, as per demands, in the future. The Tariff Commission recommendations were implemented with new policies that would eventually exclude companies that only imported parts for assembly, as well as those with no Indian partner. In 1954, following the Tariff Commission implementation, General Motors, Ford, and Rootes Group, which had assembly-only plants in Mumbai, decided to move out of India.

The Tariff commission policies by the then Indian National Congress-led government, including similar restrictions that applied to other industries, came to be known as the Licence Raj, which proved to be the greatest undoing of the Indian automotive industry, where bureaucratic red tape ended up causing demand to outstrip supply, with month-long, even year-long waiting periods for cars, scooters, and motorcycles.

Passenger cars

- Hindustan Motors was established in Kolkata in technical collaboration with Morris Motors to manufacture Morris Oxford models that would later become HM Ambassador.
- Addisons, Madras – An Amalgamations Group company, was the agent for Nuffield's Morris, Wolseley, and Riley cars, and Chrysler's Plymouth, Dodge, and De Soto cars and trucks. The first Morris Minor assembled in India and the first car assembled in Madras was driven out from Addison's twin-plants on Smith Road by Anantharamakrishnan on 15 November 1950.
- Premier Automobiles Limited, Mumbai – entered into technical collaboration with Chrysler to manufacture Dodge, Plymouth and Desoto models and with Fiat to manufacture the 1100D models which would later become Premier Padmini range.
- Standard Motor Products of India, Madras – entered into technical collaboration from Standard-Triumph to manufacture Standard Vanguard, Standard 8, 10 and later Standard Herald.

Utility and light commercial vehicles

- Vehicle Factory Jabalpur – started manufacturing Jonga Light Utility Vehicles and Vahan 1 Ton (Nissan 4W73 Carriers) in India, under license from Nissan of Japan. They were the main troop carriers of the Indian Armed Forces and much more powerful than any other vehicle of their class.Also, Nissan Power Wagon was added to their line.
- Mahindra & Mahindra plant established in Mumbai – technical collaboration with Willys to manufacture CJ Series Jeep.
- Bajaj Tempo, Pune, now Force Motors – entered into technical collaboration with Tempo to manufacture Tempo Hanseat, a three-wheeler and Tempo Viking and Hanomag, later known as Tempo Matador in India.
- Standard Motor Products of India – entered into technical collaboration from Standard and had licence to manufacture the Standard Atlas passenger van with panel van and one-tonne pickup variants.

Medium and heavy commercial vehicles

- Tata Motors established a new plant in Pune with technical collaboration with Mercedes-Benz to manufacture medium to heavy commercial vehicles both Bus and Trucks.
- Vehicle Factory Jabalpur started manufacturing Shaktiman trucks with technical assistance from MAN SE of Germany. The trucks were the main logistics vehicle of the Indian Army with several specialist variants. VFJ still is the sole supplier of B vehicles to the Indian Armed Forces.
- Heavy Vehicles Factory was established in 1965 in Avadi, Chennai to produce tanks in India. Since its inception, HVF has produced all the tanks of India, including Vijayanta, Arjun, Ajeya, Bhishma and their variants for the Indian Army. HVF is the only tank manufacturing facility of India.
- Ashok Leyland was founded in Chennai with Leyland Motors to manufacture medium to heavy commercial vehicles both Bus and Trucks. Ashok Motors also discontinued its Austin venture formed in 1948 to sell Austin A40 and retooled the factory to make trucks and buses.
- Hindustan Motors – had technical collaboration with General Motors to manufacture the Bedford range of medium lorry and bus chassis.
- Premier Automobiles Limited – entered into technical collaboration with Chrysler to manufacture the Dodge, Fargo range of medium lorry, panel vans, mini-bus, and bus chassis.
- Simpsons & Co, Madras – part of Amalgamations Group (TAFE Tractors) – had technical collaboration with Ford to manufacture medium lorry and bus chassis, but did not utilise that option until the 1980s.+

Scooters, mopeds and motorcycles

Many of the two-wheelers manufacturers were granted licenses in the early 1960s, well after the tariff commission was enabled.

- Ideal Jawa, Mysore – entered into technical collaboration with CZ - Jawa of Czechoslovakia for its Jawa and Yezdi range of motorcycles.
- Royal Enfield (India), Madras – had technical collaboration with Royal Enfield, UK to manufacture the Enfield Bullet range of motorcycles.
- Bajaj Auto, Poona – had technical collaboration with Piaggio, Italy to manufacture their best-selling Vespa range of scooters and three-wheelers with commercial options as well.
- TVS Motors, Madurai/Chennai - started individually and later had technical collaboration with Suzuki Motors, before finally buying them out of the JV.
- Automobile Products of India, Bombay (Better known for API Lambretta) – had a technical collaboration with Innocenti of Milan, Italy to manufacture their Lambretta range of mopeds, scooters and three-wheelers. This company was actually the Rootes Group car plant that was bought over by M. A. Chidambaram family.
- Mopeds India Limited, Tirupathi – had technical collaboration with Motobécane, France to manufacture their best selling Mobylette mopeds.
- Escorts Group, New Delhi – had technical collaboration with CEKOP of Poland to manufacture the Rajdoot 175 motorcycle whose origin was DKW RT 125.
- Hero Motors
- Kinetic Engineering

However, growth was relatively slow in the 1950s and 1960s, due to nationalisation and the license raj, which hampered the growth of the Indian private sector.

=== 1970 to 1983 ===
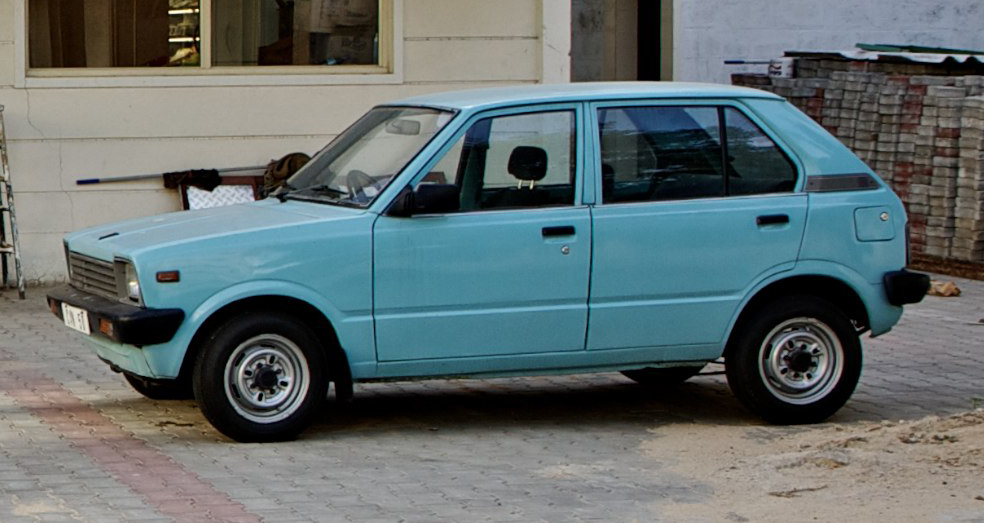
Maruti 800, launched in 1983.

The beginning of the 1970s did not see growth potential; and most of the collaboration license agreements came to an end, but with the option to continue manufacturing with renewed branding. Cars were still meant for the elite and Jeeps, now owned by American Motors Corporation, were largely used by government organizations and in some rural regions. By the end of the decade, some developments were made in commercial vehicle segments to facilitate the movement of goods. The two-wheeler segment remained unchanged except for increased sales to the middle class in urban areas. There was an emphasis on having more farm tractors, as India was embarking on a new Green Revolution; and Russian and Eastern bloc imports were brought in to meet the demand.

But after 1970, with restrictions on the import of vehicles set, the automotive industry started to grow; but the growth was mainly driven by tractors, commercial vehicles, and scooters. Cars still remained a major luxury item. In the 1970s, price controls were finally lifted, inserting a competitive element into the automobile market. However, by the 1980s, the automobile market was still dominated by Hindustan and Premier, who sold superannuated products in fairly limited numbers. The rate of car ownership in 1981 was about one in every thousand citizens – understandable when the annual road tax alone cost about half the average income of an Indian at the time.

During the eighties, a few competitors began to arrive on the scene. Of the 30,487 cars built in India in 1980, all but six came from the two main players Hindustan and Premier: Standard had led a shadow existence in the latter half of the 1970s, producing only a handful of cars to keep their license active. A new contender was tiny Sipani, which had tried building locally developed three-wheeled vehicles since 1975 but introduced the Reliant Kitten-based Dolphin in 1982. Nonetheless, all eyes were on Maruti, which caused a major upheaval to the Indian automobile industry.

The OPEC oil crisis saw increased need to install or redesign some vehicle to fit diesel engines on medium commercial vehicle. Until the early 1970s Mahindra Jeeps were on Petrol and Premier commercial vehicles had Petrol model options. The Defence sector too had most trucks on Petrol engines.

=== 1984 to 1992 ===
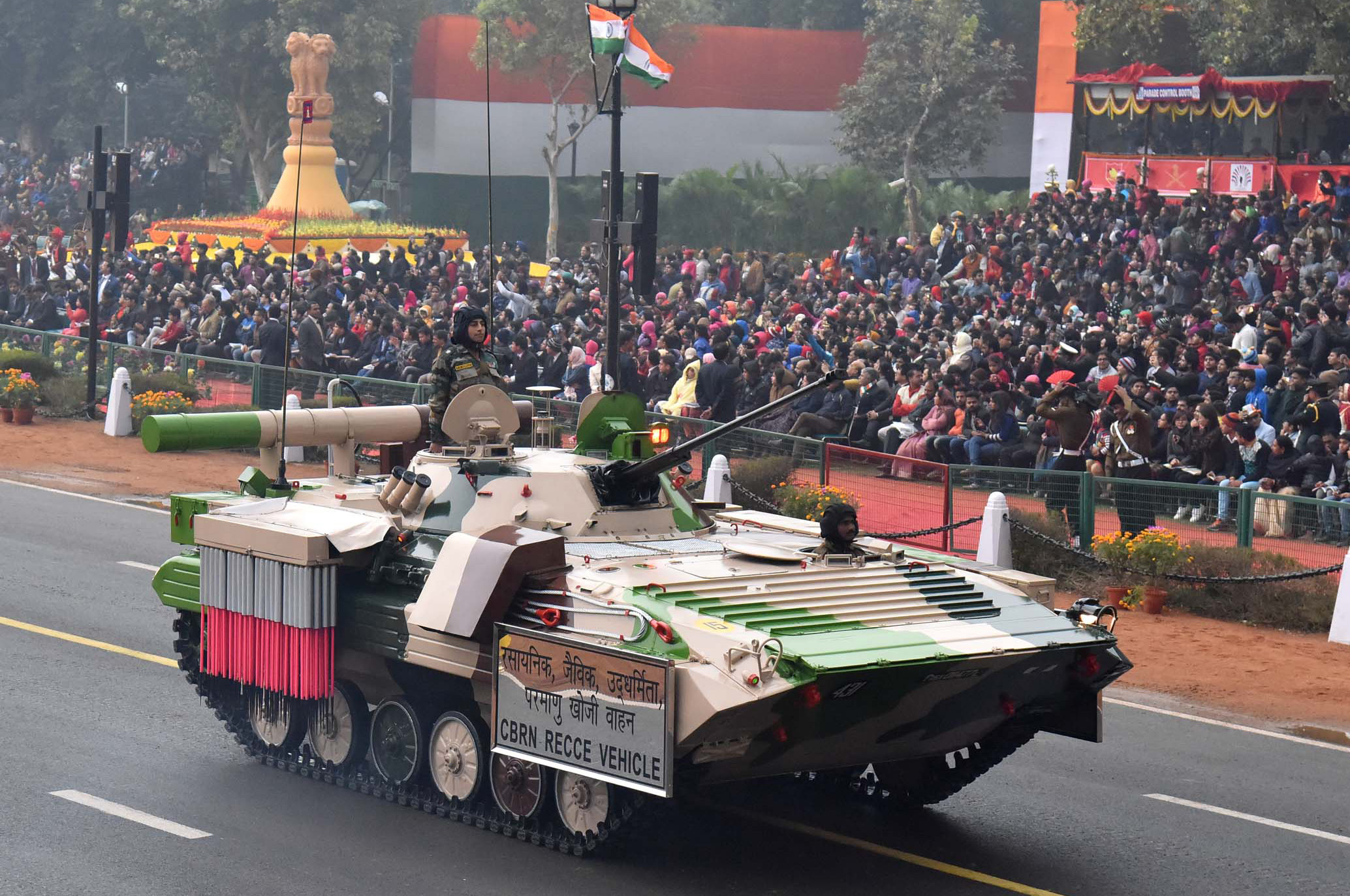
Chemical Biological Radiological and Nuclear Reconnaissance Vehicle (CBRN-RV) manufactured by the AVANI

From the end of the 1970s to the beginning of the 1980s India saw no new models, the country continuing to depend on two decades-old designs. The Sipani Dolphin, which arrived in 1982, was not a serious contender, with its plastic body and without rear doors - essential to Indian car buyers. This situation forced the government to encourage and let more manufacturers into fray.

In 1984 AVANI was established in Medak near Hyderabad. It started manufacturing Infantry Combat Vehicles christened as Sarath, the backbone of India's mechanised infantry. AVANI is still the only manufacturing facility of ICVs in India. To manufacture the high-power engines used in ICVs and main battle tanks, the Engine Factory was set up in 1987 in Avadi, near Chennai. In 1986, to promote the auto industry, the government established the Delhi Auto Expo. The 1986 Expo was a showcase for how the Indian automotive industry was absorbing new technologies, promoting indigenous research and development, and adapting these technologies for the rugged conditions of India.

=== Post-1992 liberalisation ===
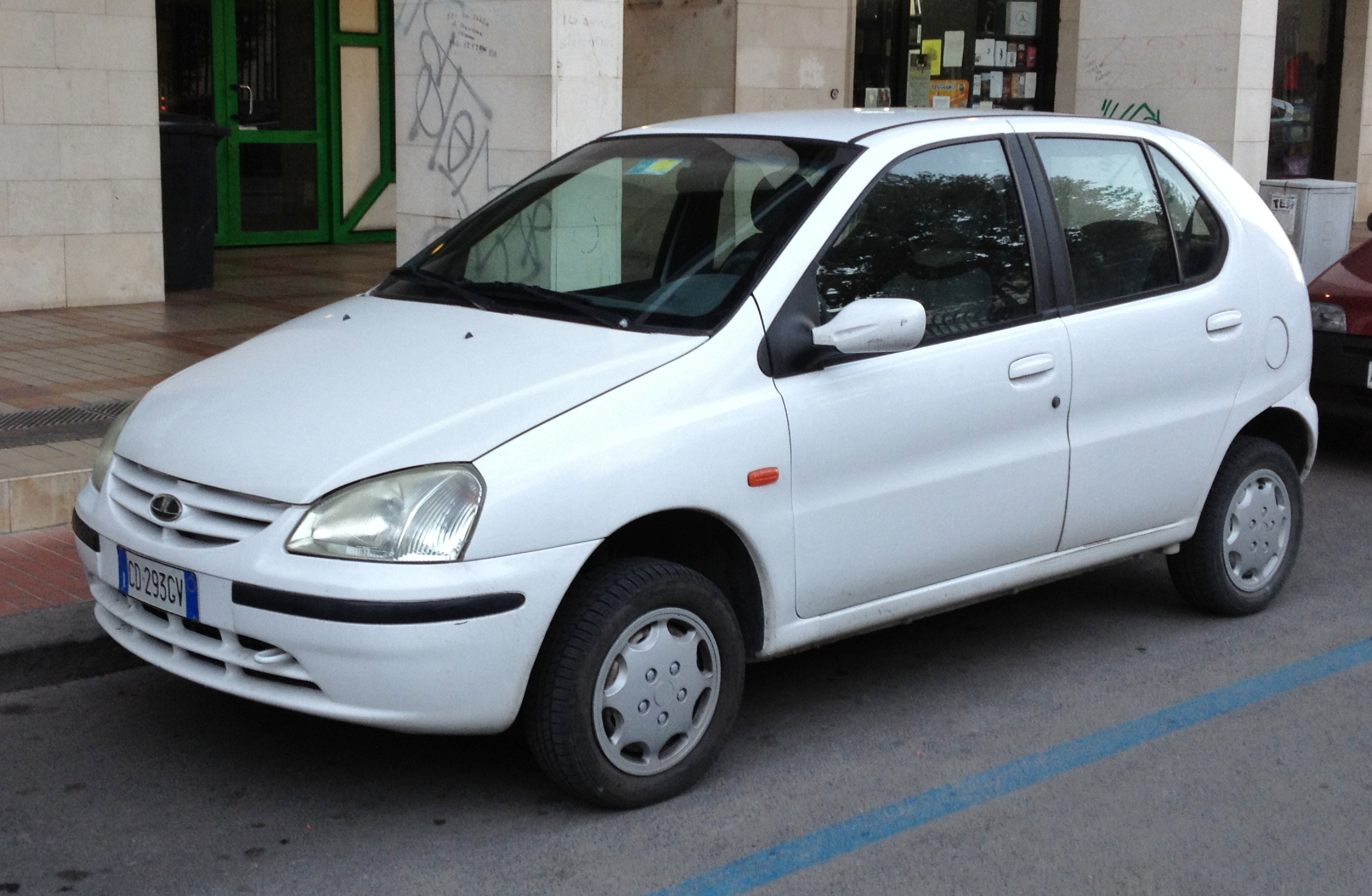
Tata Indica, launched in 1998

Eventually multinational automakers such as Suzuki and Toyota of Japan and Hyundai and Daewoo Motors of South Korea were allowed to invest in the Indian market, furthering the establishment of an automotive industry in India. Maruti Suzuki was the first and the most successful of these new entries, in part the result of government policies to promote the automotive industry beginning in the 1980s. As India began to liberalise its automobile market in 1991, a number of foreign firms also initiated joint ventures with existing Indian companies. The variety of options available to the consumer began to multiply in the nineties, whereas before there had usually only been one option in each price class. By 2000, there were 12 large automotive companies in the Indian market, most of them offshoots of global companies.

==== Slow export growth ====
Exports were slow to grow. Sales of small numbers of vehicles to tertiary markets and neighbouring countries began early, and in 1987 Maruti Suzuki shipped 480 cars to Europe (Hungary). After some growth in the mid-nineties, exports once again began to drop as the outmoded platforms provided to Indian manufacturers by multinationals were not competitive. This was not to last, and today India manufactures low-priced cars for markets across the globe. As of 18 March 2013, global brands such as Proton, PSA Group, Kia, Mazda, Chrysler, Dodge and Geely were shelving plans for India due to the competitiveness of the market, as well as the global economic crisis.

==== Emission norms ====
In 2000, in line with international standards to reduce vehicular pollution, the central government unveiled standards titled "India 2000", with later, upgraded guidelines to be known as Bharat Stage emission standards. These standards are quite similar to the stringent European emission standards and have been implemented in a phased manner.

Bharat Stage IV (BS-IV) was first implemented in 13 cities — Agra, Ahmedabad, Bengaluru, Chennai, Delhi (NCR), Kanpur, Kolkata, Lucknow, Hyderabad, Mumbai, Pune, Surat, Solapur — in April 2010, and then in the rest of the nation in April 2017.

In 2019, in line with international standards to reduce vehicular pollution, the central government of India announced the introduction of BS-VI norms to control air pollution, taking effect from 1 April 2020.

=== Local manufacturing push ===
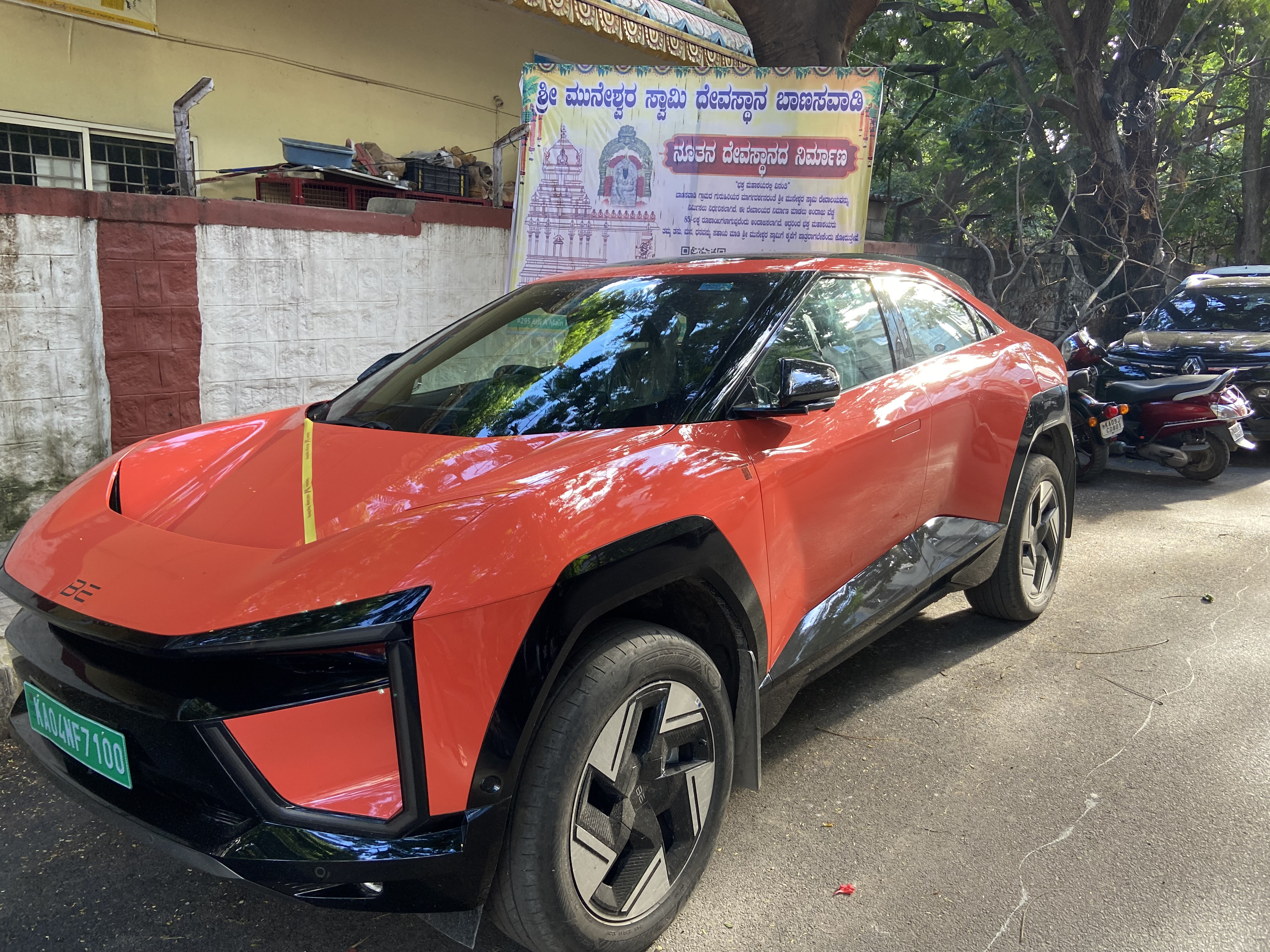
Mahindra BE6, launched in 2024

India levies an import tax of 125% on foreign imported cars, while the import tax on components such as gearboxes, airbags, drive axles is 10%. The taxes are intended to encourage cars to be manufactured or assembled in India, rather than be imported as completely built units.

=== Sub-4-metre rule ===
In 2006, the government of India imposed a new tax structure, which massively impacted the segment. It enables vehicles shorter than 4.0 metres (157.5 in) to qualify for a significantly lower excise duty, which is 8 percent as opposed to 20 percent for longer vehicles. Tata Motors was the first to exploit the new tax structure, which redesigned the rear portion of the Indigo sedan, dropping its length to 3,988 mm (157.0 in) and renamed it as the Indigo CS. The model became significantly cheaper, becoming one of the largest selling three-box cars in the country. Other manufacturers quickly adapted, which led to the release of the shorter Suzuki Swift Dzire, the Honda Brio Amaze, and others.

== Manufacturing facilities ==
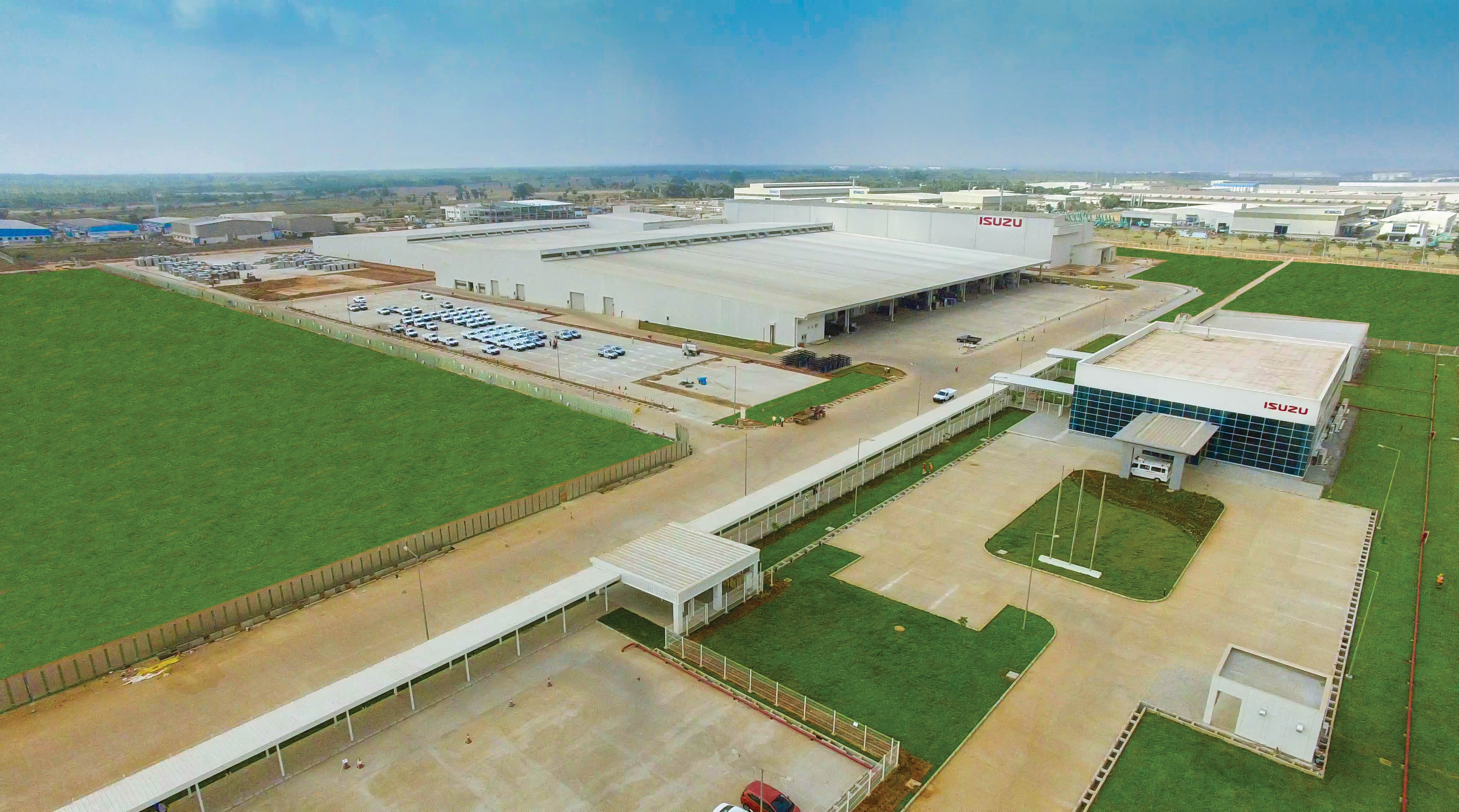
Isuzu's manufacturing plant at Sri City, Andhra Pradesh

The majority of India's car manufacturing industry is evenly divided into three "clusters". In the year 2010, around Chennai was the largest, with a 35% revenue share, accounting for 60% of the country's automotive exports, and home of the operations of Engine Factory Avadi, Ford, Hyundai, Renault, Nissan, BMW, Daimler, Caparo, Mini, and Citroën.

Near Mumbai, Maharashtra, along the Chakan corridor of Pune, is the western cluster, with a 33% share of the market. Audi, Volkswagen, and Škoda are located in Aurangabad. Mahindra and Mahindra has an SUV and engine assembly plant at Nashik. Hyundai, Tata Motors, Mercedes-Benz, Jaguar Land Rover, Stellantis, and Force Motors have assembly plants in the area.

The northern cluster is around the National Capital Region, and contributes 30%. Gurgaon, Manesar and Kharkhoda in Haryana, are where the country's largest car manufacturer, Maruti Suzuki, is based.

An emerging cluster is the state of Gujarat, with a manufacturing facility of MG Motors in Halol, Atul Auto in Rajkot and Tata Motors in Sanand. Maruti Suzuki also plans to set up a new greenfield plant in Gujarat.

Uttarakhand with Tata Motors, Telangana with Hyundai, Ordnance Factory Medak, Hyderabad Allwyn and Mahindra & Mahindra, Rajasthan with Honda, and Bengaluru - Karnataka region with Toyota, Volvo and Scania, Andhra with Isuzu and Kia and Kolkata - Jamshedpur belt also known as East India belt with companies such as Hindustan Motors, Heavy Engineering Corporation, Tata Hitachi Construction Machinery, and Tata Motors are other automotive manufacturing regions around the country.

=== Statewise vehicle manufacturing facilities ===
States	Passenger Vehicles	Commercial vehicles	Two wheelers	Other types
Andhra Pradesh	Kia India – Penukonda (Anantapur)	Isuzu Motors India – Sri City; Ashok Leyland – Vijayawada	Hero MotoCorp – Satyavedu, Royal Enfield India – Tirupathi District	Off-highway vehicles: Kobelco Cranes – Sri City
Gujarat	Tata Motors – Sanand; JSW MG Motor India – Halol; Mahindra & Mahindra – Kandla; Maruti Suzuki – Hansalpur	JCB India – Halol; Atul Auto – Rajkot & Ahmedabad	Hero MotoCorp – Halol; Honda Motorcycle and Scooter India – Vithalapur; Joy e-bike – Vadodara	
Haryana	Maruti Suzuki – Gurugram, Manesar & Kharkhoda	Action Construction Equipment – Faridabad; Escorts Group – Faridabad; JCB India – Faridabad; Omega Seiki Mobility – Faridabad	Hero MotoCorp – Dharuhera, Rewari; Honda Motorcycle & Scooter India – Manesar; India Yamaha Motor – Faridabad; Suzuki Motorcycle India – Gurugram	Agricultural vehicles: Escorts Kubota – Faridabad
Himachal Pradesh	ICML Motors – Amb	TAFE Tractors – Parwanoo	TVS Motor – Nalagarh	
Jharkhand		Tata Motors – Jamshedpur		
Karnataka	Mahindra and Mahindra – Bengaluru; Toyota Kirloskar Motor – Bidadi	Bharat Earth Movers - Bengaluru & Mysuru, KGF; Scania Commercial Vehicles India – Bengaluru; TAFE Tractors – Doddaballapur; Tata Motors – Dharwad	TVS Motor – Mysuru; Honda Motorcycle & Scooter India - Narsapura; River Mobility, Hoskote	
Kerala		Bharat Earth Movers – Palakkad; Kerala Automobiles Limited – Thiruvananthapuram		
Madhya Pradesh		Vehicle Factory – Jabalpur; Eicher Motors – Pithampur; Hindustan Motors – Pithampur; Force Motors – Pithampur; TAFE Tractors – Mandideep; John Deere Tractors – Dewas; CASE Construction Equipment - Pithampur	Mahindra & Mahindra – Pithampur	
Maharashtra	Hyundai Motor India – Talegaon; Mahindra & Mahindra – Nashik & Chakan (Pune); Tata Motors Limited; Tata Motors – Pimpri Chinchwad (Pune); Jaguar Cars – Pimpri Chinchwad (Pune); Land Rover – Pimpri Chinchwad (Pune); Mercedes-Benz Passenger Cars – Chakan (Pune); Jeep India – Ranjangaon (Pune); Volkswagen Group Sales India; Volkswagen – Chakan (Pune); Skoda Auto - Chakan (Pune), Shendra, Aurangabad; Audi India – Shendra, Aurangabad	Ashok Leyland – Bhandara; Bajaj Auto – Waluj (Aurangabad); Force Motors – Chakan (Pune); Mahindra Navistar – Chakan (Pune); Piaggio Vehicles – Baramati (Pune); Sany India – Pune; Hyundai Construction Equipment – Chakan (Pune).; Caterpillar – Banda (Sindhudurg); John Deere Tractors – Sanaswadi (Pune); Wirtgen India – Bhandgav (Pune)	Bajaj Auto – Chakan (Pune) & Waluj (Aurangabad); KTM Sportmotorcycles – Chakan (Pune); India Kawasaki Motors – Chakan (Pune); Vespa Scooters and Aprilia (brands part of Piaggio) – Baramati (Pune)	
Punjab		SML Isuzu – Shaheed Bhagat Singh Nagar		Agricultural vehicles: Swaraj Tractors – Sahibzada Ajit Singh Nagar; Sonalika Tractor – Hoshiarpur
Rajasthan	Honda Cars India – Tapukara	Ashok Leyland – Alwar	Honda Motorcycle & Scooter India – Tapukara; Hero Motocorp – Neemrana; Okinawa Autotech – Alwar & Bhiwadi	Agricultural vehicles: TAFE Tractors – Alwar
Tamil Nadu (Chennai)	BMW India – Mahindra World City (Chennai); MINI India – Mahindra World City (Chennai); Hyundai Motor India – Sriperumbudur (Chennai); Renault Nissan Automotive India Private Limited; Nissan Motor India – Oragadam (Chennai); Renault India – Oragadam, Chennai; Datsun – Oragadam, Chennai; Citroën India – Tiruvallur, Chennai; BYD India Pvt. Ltd – Sriperumbudur, Chennai	Schwing Stetter India – Chennai; Komatsu India Private Limited – Oragadam, Chennai; Daimler India Commercial Vehicles Private Limited – Oragadam, Chennai; Caterpillar – Tiruvallur, Chennai; Ashok Leyland Limited; Ennore, Chennai – trucks, buses, engines, axles etc.; Hosur – three adjacent plants (Hosur-1, Hosur-2, CPPS) for trucks, special vehicles and power units.; Sengadu Village, Kanchipuram – technical and production facility for Ashok Leyland Defence Systems; KamAZ Vectra Motors – Hosur; SAME Deutz-Fahr Tractors – Ranipet, Vellore; TAFE Tractors – Chennai, Madurai; TVS Motor – Hosur; Force Motors – Chennai	TVS Motor – Hosur; BMW Motorrad – Hosur; Royal Enfield – Chennai; India Yamaha Motor – Oragadam, Chennai; Ola Electric – Krishnagiri; Ather Energy – Hosur	Defence: Heavy Vehicles Factory – Avadi, Chennai
Telangana		Mahindra and Mahindra – Zaheerabad		Defence: Armoured Vehicles Nigam Limited – Medak
Uttar Pradesh	Honda Cars India – Greater Noida	Tata Motors – Lucknow; New Holland – Greater Noida	India Yamaha Motor – Greater Noida	
Uttarakhand		Ashok Leyland – Pantnagar; Tata Motors – Pantnagar; Mahindra & Mahindra – Haridwar	Hero MotoCorp – Haridwar; Bajaj Auto – Pantnagar	
West Bengal		Tata Hitachi Construction Machinery – Kharagpur; Gainwell - Panagarh		

== Exports ==
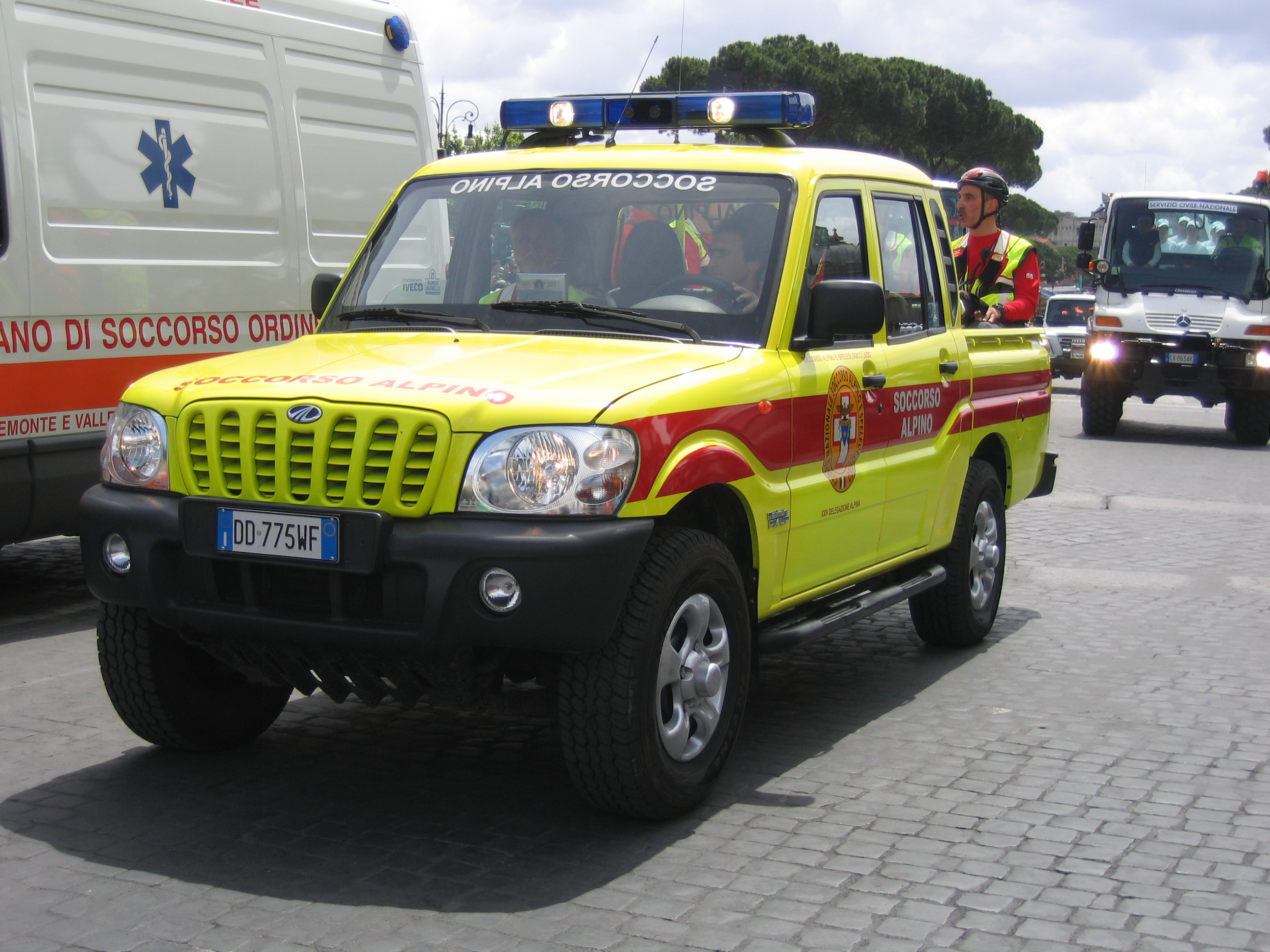
2007 Mahindra Scorpio Pickup in service with Italy's CNSAS

In 2025, India became world's third largest manufacturer of vehicles, and exported 50% of its two-wheeler production. India's automobile exports have grown consistently and reached $4.5 billion in 2009, with the United Kingdom being India's largest export market, followed by Italy, Germany, the Netherlands, and South Africa.

According to The New York Times, India's strong engineering base and expertise in the manufacturing of low-cost, fuel-efficient cars has resulted in the expansion of manufacturing facilities of several automobile companies like Hyundai, Nissan, Toyota, Volkswagen, and Maruti Suzuki.

In 2008, Hyundai alone exported 240,000 cars made in India. Nissan planned to export 250,000 vehicles manufactured in its India plant by 2011. Similarly, US automobile company, General Motors had announced its plans to export about 50,000 cars manufactured in India by 2011.

In September 2009, Ford announced its plans to set up a plant in India with an annual capacity of 250,000 cars, for US$500 million. The cars were manufactured both for the Indian market and for export. The company said that the plant was a part of its plan to make India the hub for its global production business. Fiat had announced that it would source more than US$1 billion worth auto components from India.

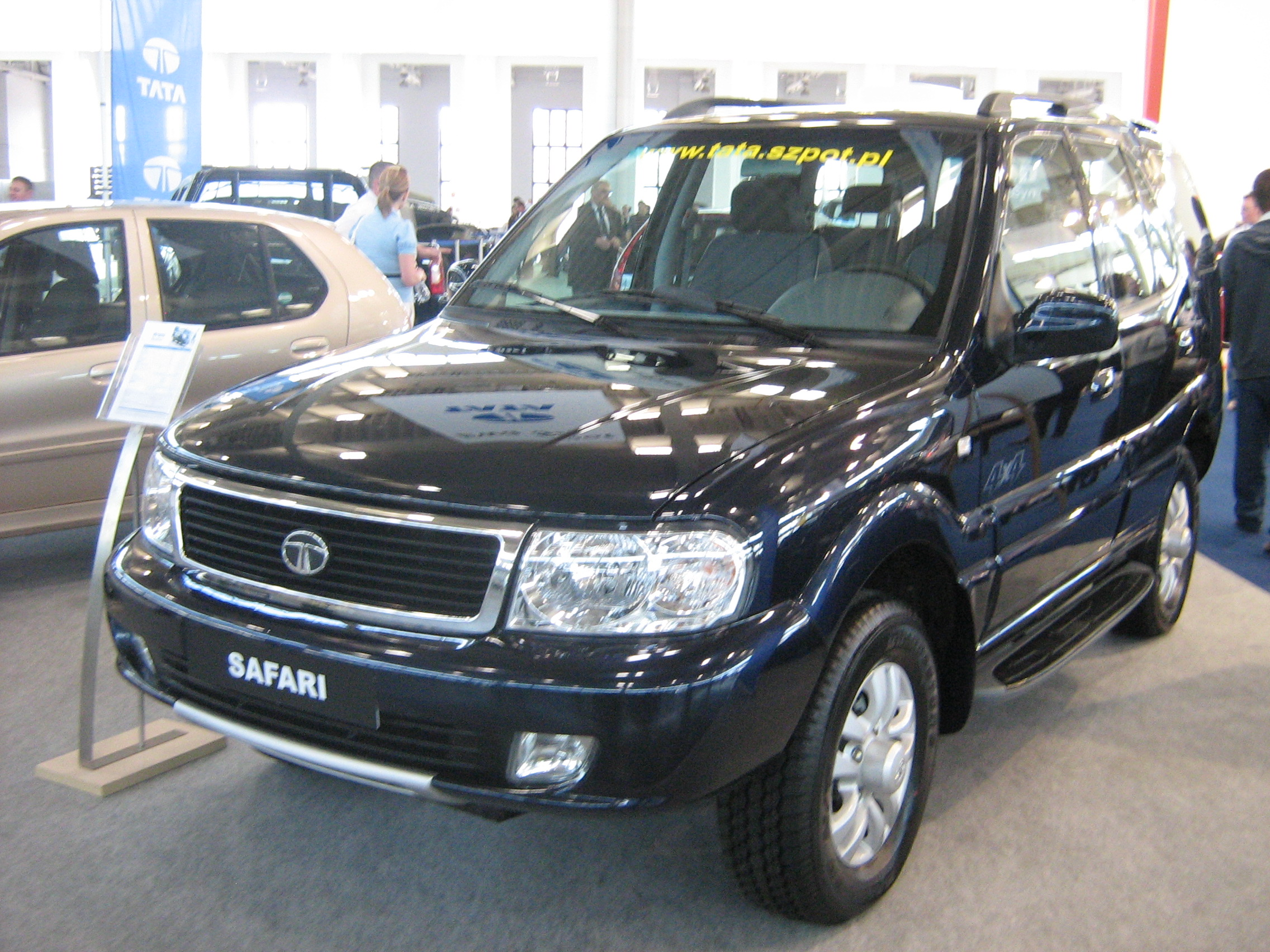
A Tata Safari on display in Poznań, Poland

In 2009, India (0.23m) surpassed China (0.16m) as Asia's fourth largest exporter of cars after Japan (1.77m), Korea (1.12m) and Thailand (0.26m).

In July 2010, The Economic Times reported that PSA Peugeot Citroën was planning to re-enter the Indian market and open a production plant in Andhra Pradesh that would have an annual capacity of 100,000 vehicles, investing €700M in the operation. Citroën entered the market in 2021 with their first offering being the Citroën C5 Aircross.

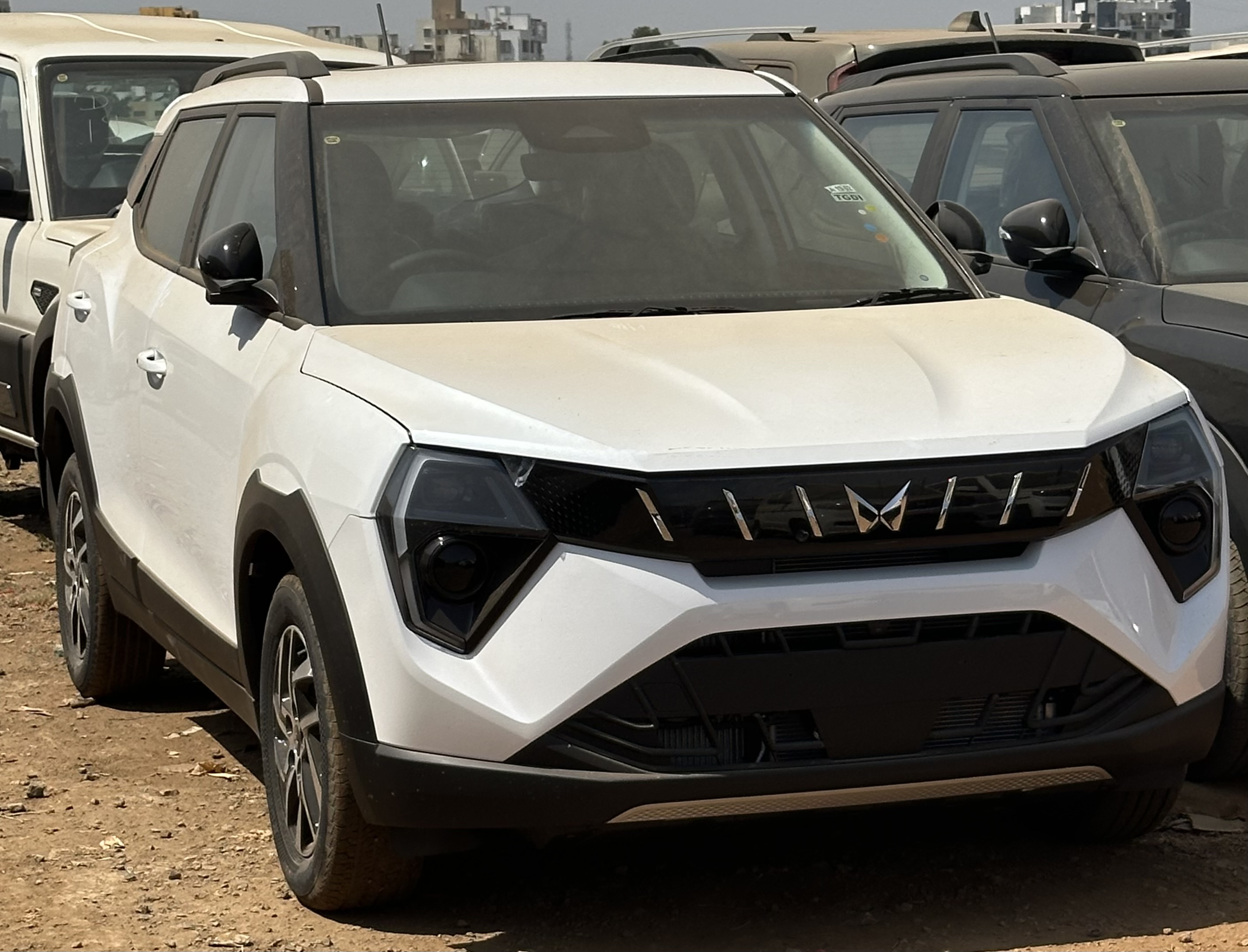
2025 Mahindra 3XO at a dealership in India

In recent years, India has emerged as a leading center for the manufacture of small cars. Maruti Suzuki and Hyundai are the two biggest exporters of cars from the country. Nissan also exports small cars from its Indian assembly line. Tata Motors exports its passenger vehicles to several Asian and African markets. In the 2000s, Mahindra & Mahindra prepared to introduce its pickup trucks and small SUV models in the U.S. market, but canceled its plans. As of 2019, it is assembling and selling an off-road vehicle (Mahindra Roxor; not certified for road use) in limited numbers in the U.S. It is also sold in Canada. While the possibilities for the Indian automobile industry are impressive, there are challenges that could thwart future growth. Since the demand for automobiles in recent years is directly linked to overall economic expansion and rising personal incomes, industry growth will slow if the economy weakens.

Mahindra's major overseas markets include Australia, South Africa, New Zealand, United States and South Asia.

=== Top 10 export destinations ===
India exported $14.5 billion worth of automobiles in 2014. The 10 countries below imported 47.8% of that total.

Rank	Country	Value (US$)	Share
1	United States	1.2 billion	8.4%
2	Mexico	$1 billion	6.9%
3	South Africa	$888.8 million	6.1%
4	United Kingdom	$637.4 million	4.4%
5	Sri Lanka	$596.9 million	4.1%
6	Bangladesh	$592.1 million	4.1%
7	Turkey	$580.4 million	4%
8	Nigeria	$546.8 million	3.8%
9	United Arab Emirates	$433.6 million	3%
10	Colombia	$428.9 million	3%

Exports of Vehicles in India decreased to US$1478.68 Million in 2020 from US$11332.49 Million in 2019.

India Exports by Country	Last	Previous		
United States	485.03	469.28	INR Billion	Nov/22
United Arab Emirates	211.45	179.69	INR Billion	Nov/22
Netherlands	146.98	118.23	INR Billion	Nov/22
Israel	122.55	44.07	INR Billion	Nov/22
Brazil	91.30	72.88	INR Billion	Nov/22
China	86.57	83.21	INR Billion	Nov/22
Germany	66.84	63.42	INR Billion	Nov/22
Saudi Arabia	60.38	66.42	INR Billion	Nov/22
Indonesia	58.89	51.32	INR Billion	Nov/22
Singapore	55.63	63.31	INR Billion	Nov/22
Hong Kong	51.40	62.34	INR Billion	Nov/22
Belgium	51.05	53.36	INR Billion	Nov/22
Nepal	50.69	36.95	INR Billion	Nov/22
Italy	49.29	45.34	INR Billion	Nov/22
France	45.78	41.27	INR Billion	Nov/22
South Africa	43.83	47.85	INR Billion	Nov/22
Malaysia	40.15	42.70	INR Billion	Nov/22
Japan	37.21	33.27	INR Billion	Nov/22
Australia	34.64	44.76	INR Billion	Nov/22
Nigeria	33.16	38.53	INR Billion	Nov/22
Thailand	32.57	37.15	INR Billion	Nov/22
Sri Lanka	27.95	35.21	INR Billion	Nov/22
Canada	26.50	22.95	INR Billion	Nov/22
Spain	25.97	30.04	INR Billion	Nov/22
Russia	24.72	23.06	INR Billion	Nov/22
Egypt	22.94	20.94	INR Billion	Nov/22
Kenya	20.10	11.64	INR Billion	Nov/22
Iraq	16.64	15.62	INR Billion	Nov/22
Taiwan	13.58	15.32	INR Billion	Nov/22
Philippines	12.80	13.78	INR Billion	Nov/22
Portugal	9.58	4.35	INR Billion	Nov/22
Switzerland	8.82	12.34	INR Billion	Nov/22
Iran	8.33	6.05	INR Billion	Nov/22
Denmark	6.03	4.59	INR Billion	Nov/22
Sweden	5.60	5.49	INR Billion	Nov/22
Ireland	4.26	3.12	INR Billion	Nov/22
Greece	3.91	3.65	INR Billion	Nov/22
Pakistan	3.70	3.20	INR Billion	Nov/22
New Zealand	2.81	2.85	INR Billion	Nov/22
Finland	2.78	2.45	INR Billion	Nov/22
Luxembourg	0.24	0.25	INR Billion	Nov/22

== Passenger vehicle manufacturers in India ==
India is the 4th largest passenger vehicle producer in the world. In 2024–25, it produced 5.06 million cars. Currently, there are an estimated 30 million cars in India.

This list is of cars that are officially available and serviced in India.

=== Indian brands ===
==== Models currently manufactured by Indian brands ====
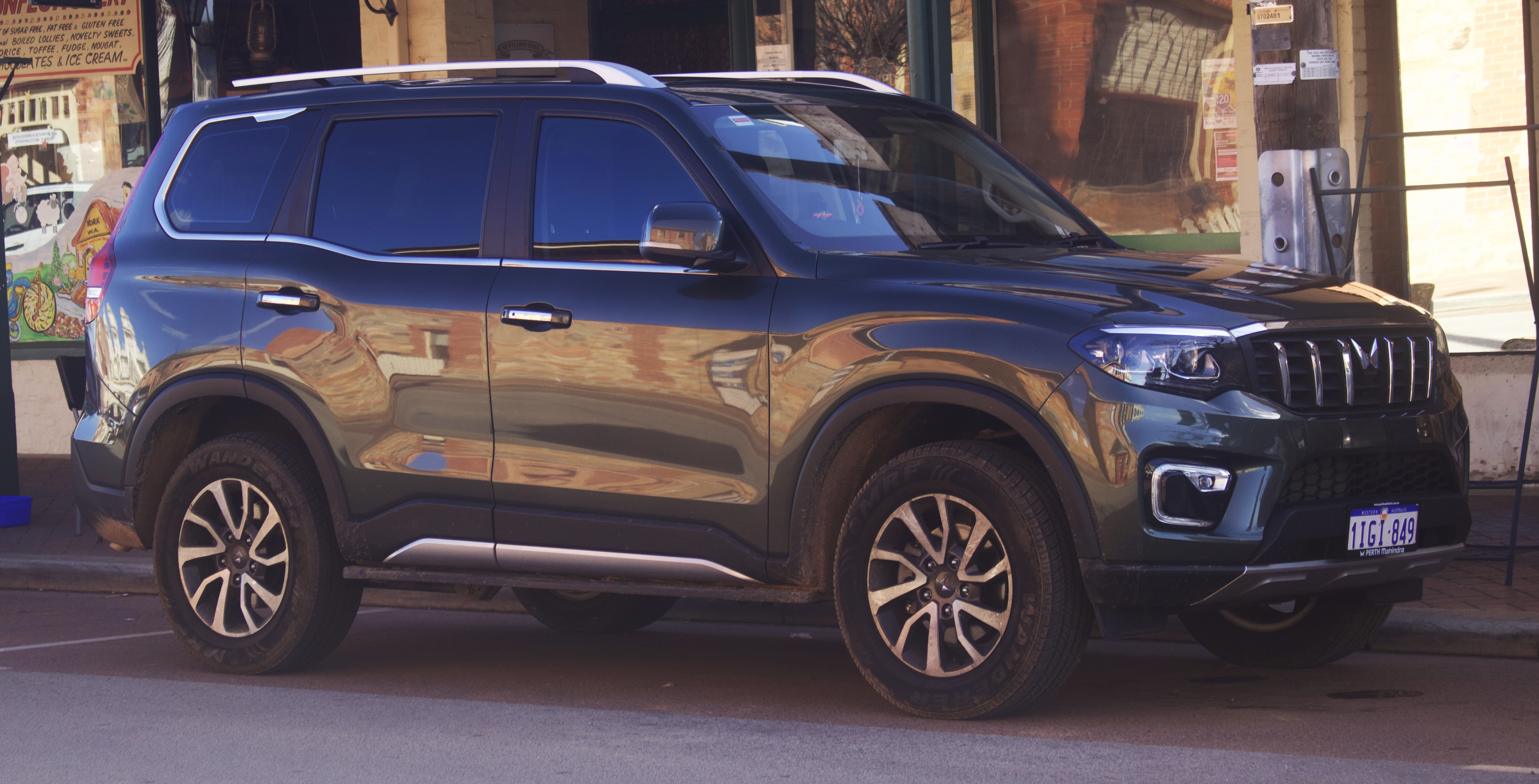
Mahindra Scorpio-N.

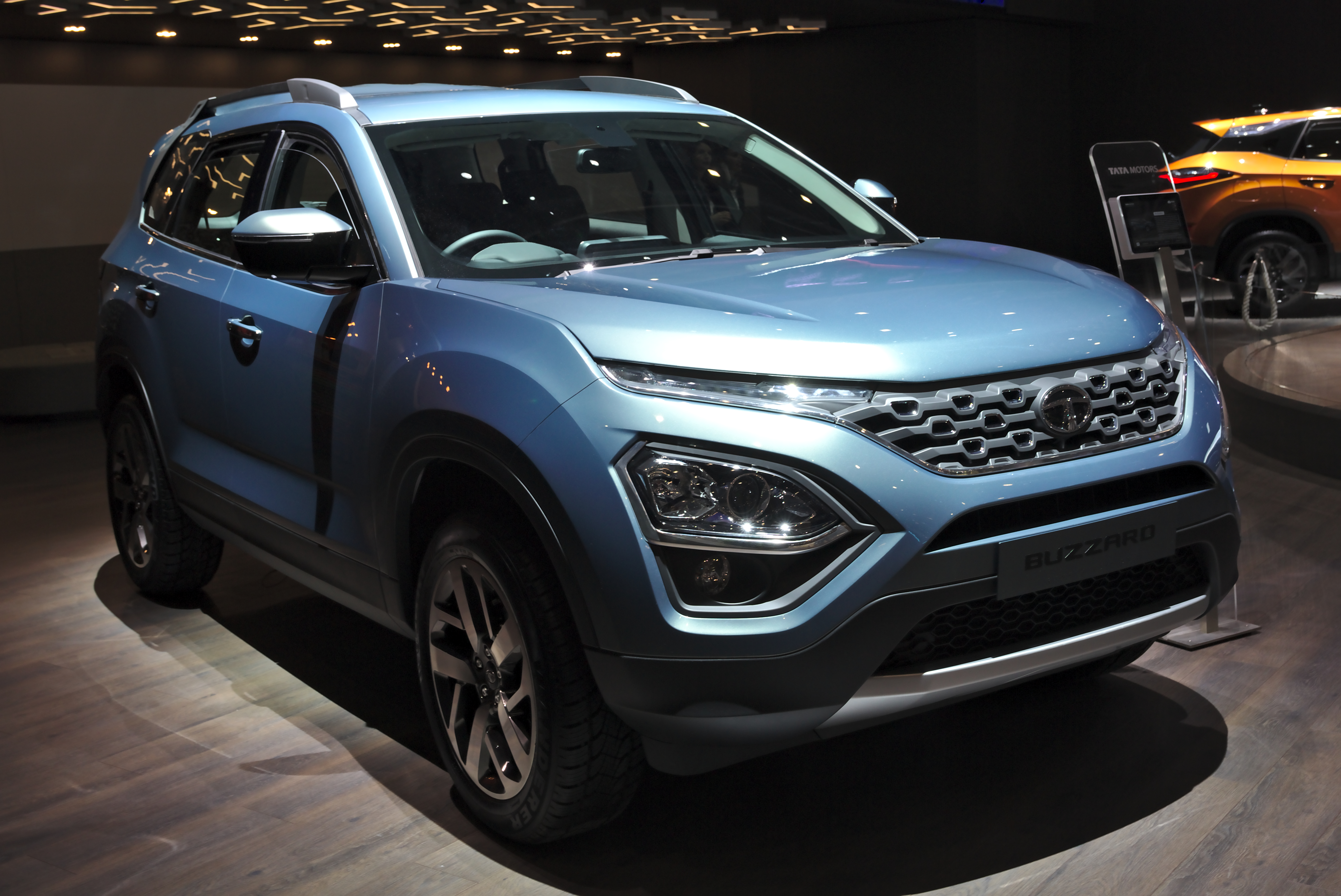
Tata Safari

- Mahindra: Bolero, Bolero Neo, Scorpio, Scorpio-N, Scorpio Getaway, Thar, Thar Roxx, Marazzo, XUV 3XO, XUV 7XO, BE 6, XEV 9e, XEV 9S
- Tata Cars: Tiago, Tiago EV, Tigor, Tigor EV, Nexon, Nexon EV, Harrier, Altroz, Safari, Punch, Punch EV, Curvv, Curvv EV, Sierra
- Force Motors: Trax, Gurkha

==== Defunct Indian brands ====
- Hindustan Motors - the company still exists, but no longer manufactures automobiles
- Premier Automobiles Limited
- Sipani Automobiles
- Standard Motor Products of India Limited

=== Joint-venture (JV) brands ===
- Maruti Suzuki (subsidiary of Japanese auto maker Suzuki): Alto K10, Eeco, Wagon R, Swift, Dzire, Ertiga, Celerio, Brezza, Baleno, XL6, S-Presso, Grand Vitara, Jimny, Fronx, Super Carry, Invicto, Victoris
- JSW MG Motor India (joint venture between JSW Group and SAIC Motor): Astor, Comet EV, Gloster, Hector, Hector Plus, Hector Tomahawk, ZS EV, Windsor EV, Majestor
- Toyota Kirloskar Motor (joint venture between Kirloskar Group and Toyota): Innova Crysta, Innova Hycross, Fortuner, Camry, Glanza, Rumion, Urban Cruiser Hyryder, Hilux, Urban Cruiser Taisor

=== Foreign-owned brands ===
MG, Hyundai, Renault, Nissan, Citroën, Jeep, Honda, Toyota, Kia, Volkswagen, Škoda, Audi, Mercedes-Benz, BMW and Mini are the foreign automotive companies or brands that manufacture and market their products in India.

==== Vehicles currently manufactured in India ====
- Audi India: A6, Q5, Q7
- BMW India: 3 Series, 5 Series, X1, X3, X4, X5, X7
- BYD: Atto 3
- Citroën India: C3, C3 Aircross, C5 Aircross, ë-C3, Basalt
- Honda Cars India: Amaze, City, Elevate
- Hyundai Motor India: Grand i10 Nios, i20, Alcazar, Aura, Creta, Exter, Tucson, Venue, Verna
- Isuzu Motors India: D-Max
- Jeep: Compass, Grand Cherokee, Meridian, Wrangler
- Kia India: Carens, Seltos, Sonet, Syros
- Land Rover (subsidiary of Tata Motors): Range Rover, Range Rover Evoque, Range Rover Sport, Range Rover Velar
- Mercedes-Benz India: C-Class, E-Class, EQS, S-Class, V-Class, GLC, GLE
- Nissan Motor India: Gravite, Magnite, Tekton
- Renault India: Duster, Kiger, Kwid, Triber
- Škoda Auto India: Kushaq, Kodiaq, Slavia, Kylaq
- VinFast: VF 6, VF 7, VF MPV 7
- Volkswagen India: Virtus, Taigun
- Volvo Cars: S90, XC40, XC90

==== Foreign-owned makes that were officially marketed in India after 1991 ====
- Peugeot stopped selling passenger cars in India in 1997.
- Daewoo Motors stopped selling passenger cars in India in 2003.
- Opel was present in India until 2006. As of 2013, Opel only provides spare parts and vehicle servicing to existing Opel vehicle owners.
- General Motors India stopped producing Chevrolet passenger cars for the Indian market in late 2017.
- Fiat left the Indian market in 2018.
- Mitsubishi Motors stopped selling passenger cars in India in the late 2010s.
- Ford India stopped producing passenger cars for the Indian market in late 2021.
- Nissan stopped selling Datsun passenger cars in India in 2022.

=== Statistics ===
Production & sale of vehicles in India
Type		2019-20	2020-21	2021-22	2022-23	2023-24	2024-25
Passenger Vehicles	Production	3,424,564	3,062,280	3,650,698	4,587,116	4,901,840	5,061,164
Passenger Vehicles	Domestic Sales	2,773,519	2,711,457	3,069,523	3,890,114	4,218,750	4,301,848
Passenger Vehicles	Export Sales	662,118	404,397	577,875	662,891	672,105	770,364
Commercial Vehicles	Production	756,725	624,939	805,527	1,035,626	1,067,504	1,032,645
Commercial Vehicles	Domestic Sales	717,593	568,559	716,566	962,468	968,770	956,671
Commercial Vehicles	Export Sales	60,379	50,334	92,297	78,645	65,818	80,986
Three wheelers	Production	1,132,982	614,613	758,669	855,696	996,159	1,050,020
Three wheelers	Domestic Sales	637,065	219,446	261,385	488,768	694,801	741,420
Three wheelers	Export Sales	501,651	393,001	499,730	365,549	299,977	306,914
Two wheelers	Production	21,032,927	18,349,941	17,821,111	19,459,009	21,468,527	23,883,857
Two wheelers	Domestic Sales	17,416,432	15,120,783	13,570,008	15,862,771	17,974,365	19,607,332
Two wheelers	Export Sales	3,519,405	3,282,786	4,443,131	3,652,122	3,458,416	4,198,403

Top 10 best-selling automobile models in India (new passenger and commercial vehicles), 1985–2024 Source:
Year	Models and Ranking									
Year	1st	2nd	3rd	4th	5th	6th	7th	8th	9th	10th
1985	Maruti 800	Premier Padmini	Hindustan Ambassador	Mahindra Jeep	Maruti Van	Mahindra FJ/XJ	Force Matador	Force Trax	Hindustan Contessa	Hindustan Trekker
1986	Maruti 800	Premier Padmini	Hindustan Ambassador	Maruti Van	Mahindra Jeep	Mahindra FJ/XJ	Force Matador	Maruti Gypsy	Tata 407/608/609	Force Trax
1987	Maruti 800	Premier Padmini	Maruti Van	Mahindra Jeep	Hindustan Ambassador	Force Matador	Tata 407/608/609	Mahindra FJ/XJ	Premier 118NE	Maruti Gypsy
1988	Maruti 800	Premier Padmini	Maruti Omni	Mahindra Jeep	Hindustan Ambassador	Tata 407/608/609	Force Matador	Mahindra FJ/XJ	Maruti Gypsy	Premier 118NE
1989	Maruti 800	Premier Padmini	Maruti Omni	Mahindra Jeep	Hindustan Ambassador	Tata 407/608/609	Maruti Gypsy	Force Matador	Premier 118NE	Mahindra FJ/XJ
1990	Maruti 800	Premier Padmini	Maruti Omni	Mahindra Jeep	Hindustan Ambassador	Tata 407/608/609	Maruti Gypsy	Force Matador	Premier 118NE	Mahindra FJ/XJ
1991	Maruti 800	Maruti Omni	Premier Padmini	Mahindra Jeep	Tata 407/608/609	Hindustan Ambassador	Premier 118NE	Force Matador	Maruti Gypsy	Force Trax
1992	Maruti 800	Mahindra Jeep	Maruti Omni	Tata 407/608/609	Hindustan Ambassador	Premier Padmini	Force Matador	Premier 118NE	Force Trax	Maruti Gypsy
1993	Maruti 800	Mahindra Jeep	Maruti Omni	Tata 407/608/609	Hindustan Ambassador	Premier Padmini	Force Matador	Maruti 1000	Premier 118NE	Force Trax
1994	Maruti 800	Mahindra Jeep	Maruti Omni	Tata 407/608/609	Hindustan Ambassador	Premier Padmini	Force Matador	Maruti 1000	Force Trax	Premier 118NE
1995	Maruti 800	Mahindra Jeep	Tata 407/608/609	Maruti Esteem	Maruti Omni	Hindustan Ambassador	Maruti Zen	Premier Padmini	Tata Sumo	Force Matador
1996	Maruti 800	Mahindra Jeep	Tata 407/608/609	Maruti Omni	Maruti Zen	Tata Sumo	Maruti Esteem	Hindustan Ambassador	Daewoo Cielo	Force Trax
1997	Maruti 800	Mahindra Jeep	Maruti Zen	Maruti Omni	Tata Sumo	Tata 407/608/609	Hindustan Ambassador	Maruti Esteem	Daewoo Cielo	Opel Astra
1998	Maruti 800	Maruti Zen	Maruti Omni	Mahindra Jeep	Tata 407/608/609	Tata Sumo	Hindustan Ambassador	Maruti Esteem	Hyundai Santro	Honda City
1999	Maruti 800	Maruti Zen	Maruti Omni	Hyundai Santro	Mahindra Jeep	Tata Indica	Tata 407/608/609	Daewoo Matiz	Tata Sumo	Maruti Esteem
2000	Maruti 800	Hyundai Santro	Maruti Zen	Maruti Omni	Mahindra Jeep	Tata Indica	Daewoo Matiz	Tata 407/608/609	Tata Sumo	Toyota Qualis
2001	Maruti 800	Hyundai Santro	Maruti Zen	Maruti Omni	Tata Indica	Mahindra Jeep	Maruti Alto	Toyota Qualis	Tata 407/608/609	Tata Sumo
2002	Maruti 800	Hyundai Santro	Tata Indica	Maruti Zen	Maruti Omni	Mahindra Jeep	Maruti Wagon R	Tata 407/608/609	Fiat Palio	Maruti Alto
2003	Maruti 800	Hyundai Santro	Tata Indica	Maruti Zen	Maruti Omni	Maruti Wagon R	Maruti Alto	Mahindra Jeep	Toyota Qualis	Tata 407/608/609
2004	Maruti 800	Maruti Alto	Hyundai Santro	Tata Indica	Maruti Wagon R	Maruti Zen	Maruti Omni	Mahindra Jeep	Toyota Qualis	Tata Indigo
2005	Maruti Alto	Hyundai Santro	Tata Indica	Maruti 800	Maruti Wagon R	Maruti Omni	Maruti Zen	Mahindra Jeep	Maruti Swift	Tata Indigo
2006	Maruti Alto	Hyundai Santro	Tata Indica	Maruti Wagon R	Maruti 800	Maruti Omni	Maruti Swift	Tata Ace	Honda City	Mahindra Jeep
FY07-08	Maruti Suzuki Alto	Tata Indica	Maruti Wagon R	Hyundai Santro	Maruti Swift	Maruti Omni	Maruti 800	Maruti Zen Estilo	Hyundai i10	Toyota Innova
2008	data unavailable									
2009	Maruti Suzuki Alto	Maruti Wagon R	Hyundai i10	Tata Indica	Maruti Swift	Maruti Omni	Hyundai Santro	Maruti Swift Dzire	Mahindra Bolero	Honda City
2010	Maruti Suzuki Alto	Hyundai i10	Maruti Wagon R	Maruti Swift	Tata Indica	Maruti Swift Dzire	Maruti Omni	Hyundai Santro	Tata Indigo	Mahindra Bolero
2011	Maruti Suzuki Alto	Maruti Wagon R	Hyundai i10	Maruti Swift	Tata Indica/Vista	Maruti Swift Dzire	Mahindra Bolero	Maruti Omni	Hyundai i20	Tata Indigo/Manza
2012	Maruti Suzuki Alto	Maruti Swift	Maruti Swift Dzire	Maruti Wagon R	Mahindra Bolero	Hyundai i10	Tata Indica/Vista	Hyundai Eon	Hyundai i20	Tata Nano
2013	Maruti Suzuki Alto	Maruti Swift	Maruti Swift Dzire	Maruti Wagon R	Mahindra Bolero	Hyundai Eon	Hyundai i10	Hyundai i20	Toyota Innova	Maruti Ertiga
2014	Maruti Suzuki Alto	Maruti Swift Dzire	Maruti Swift	Maruti Wagon R	Hyundai i10	Mahindra Bolero	Hyundai Eon	Honda City	Maruti Omni	Hyundai i20
2015	Maruti Suzuki Alto	Maruti Swift Dzire	Maruti Swift	Maruti Wagon R	Hyundai i20	Hyundai i10	Mahindra Bolero	Maruti Celerio	Honda City	Hyundai Eon
2016	Maruti Suzuki Alto	Maruti Swift Dzire	Maruti Wagon R	Maruti Swift	Hyundai i10	Hyundai i20	Maruti Baleno	Renault Kwid	Hyundai Creta	Maruti Celerio
2017	Maruti Suzuki Alto	Maruti Dzire	Maruti Baleno	Maruti Swift	Maruti Wagon R	Hyundai i10	Maruti Vitara Brezza	Hyundai i20	Hyundai Creta	Maruti Celerio
2018	Maruti Suzuki Dzire	Maruti Alto	Maruti Swift	Maruti Baleno	Maruti Vitara Brezza	Maruti Wagon R	Hyundai i20	Hyundai i10	Hyundai Creta	Maruti Celerio
2019	Maruti Suzuki Alto	Maruti Dzire	Maruti Swift	Maruti Baleno	Maruti Wagon R	Maruti Vitara Brezza	Hyundai i20	Maruti Eeco	Hyundai i10	Hyundai Creta
2020	Maruti Suzuki Swift	Maruti Alto	Maruti Baleno	Maruti Wagon R	Maruti Dzire	Maruti Eeco	Hyundai Creta	Kia Seltos	Hyundai i10	Maruti Vitara Brezza
2021	Maruti Suzuki Wagon R	Maruti Swift	Maruti Baleno	Maruti Alto	Hyundai Creta	Maruti Dzire	Maruti Vitara Brezza	Maruti Eeco	Maruti Ertiga	Tata Nexon
2022	Maruti Suzuki Wagon R	Maruti Baleno	Maruti Swift	Tata Nexon	Maruti Alto	Maruti Dzire	Hyundai Creta	Maruti Ertiga	Maruti Brezza	Tata Punch
2023	Maruti Suzuki Swift	Maruti Wagon R	Maruti Baleno	Maruti Brezza	Tata Nexon	Maruti Dzire	Hyundai Creta	Tata Punch	Maruti Eeco	Maruti Ertiga
2024	Tata Punch	Maruti Wagon R	Maruti Ertiga	Maruti Brezza	Hyundai Creta	Maruti Swift	Maruti Baleno	Maruti Dzire	Mahindra Scorpio	Tata Nexon
2025	Maruti Dzire	Hyundai Creta	Tata Nexon	Maruti Wagon R	Maruti Ertiga	Maruti Swift	Maruti Fronx	Mahindra Scorpio	Maruti Brezza	Tata Punch
	1st	2nd	3rd	4th	5th	6th	7th	8th	9th	10th
Indigenous manufacturer Local listed-foreign manufacturer (ex- foreign JV) Foreign manufacturer
See also: Best-selling models in: Australia; Brazil; Indonesia; Japan; Malaysia; Philippines; Thailand; Sweden

2024 passenger car sales data
Rank	OEM	2025 sales	Share	2024 sales	Share	2023 sales	Share
1	Maruti Suzuki	1,806,514	40%	▲1,755,423	▼40.9%	1,707,668	41.6%
2	Mahindra	626,192	14%	▲528,453	▲12.4%	432,876	10.6%
3	Tata Motors	578,773	13%	▲562,482	▼13.1%	550,871	13.4%
4	Hyundai	571,878	13%	▲605,433	▼14.1%	602,111	14.7%
5	Toyota	350,991	8%	▲300,159	▲7.0%	221,356	5.4%
6	Kia	280,286	6%	▼245,000	▼5.7%	255,000	6.2%
11	Škoda	72,642	1.6%	▼35,164	▼0.8%	48,755	1.2%
7	MG Motor	69,493	1.5%	▲61,214	1.4%	56,902	1.4%
8	Honda	62,706	1.4%	▼68,658	▼1.6%	84,286	2.1%
9	Volkswagen	39,137	0.9%	▼42,000	▼1.0%	43,481	1.1%
10	Renault	38,065	0.8%	▼41,729	▼1.0%	48,321	1.2%
12	Nissan	22,391	0.5%	▼29,009	▼0.6%	30,375	0.7%
13	Citroën	7,898	0.2%	▼7,448	▼0.1%	9,488	0.2%
14	Jeep	2,947	0.1%	▼4,251	▼0.1%	6,690	0.2%

== Auto companies ==
=== Indian brands ===
- Ather Energy
- Atul Auto
- Bajaj Auto
- Eicher Motors
- EKA Mobility
- Euler Motors
- Force Motors
- Hero MotoCorp
- Hindustan Motors
- JBM Auto
- Mahindra Automotive
- Montra Electric
- Motovolt
- Ola Electric
- Olectra Greentech
- Omega Seiki Mobility
- Royal Enfield
- Simple Energy (vehicle company)
- Tara International
- Tata Cars
- Tata Motors
- TVS Motor Company
- Ultraviolette Automotive
- Vida

=== Joint-venture (JV) brands ===
- Ashok Leyland - originally a JV between Ashok Motors (owned by the Hinduja Group) and Leyland Motors, now joint ventures between Ashok Leyland and Nissan Motors (Japan) for LCV's; and John Deere (USA) for construction equipment.
- VE Commercial Vehicles Limited - VE Commercial Vehicles limited - A JV between Volvo Group and Eicher Motors Limited.

=== Foreign-owned brands ===
- BharatBenz (Owned by Daimler AG of Germany and affiliated with Daimler's Fuso and Mercedes-Benz brands)
- Caterpillar Inc.
- DAF
- Isuzu
- Iveco (Subsidiary of Tata Motors)
- J. C. Bamford (JCB) (Owned by British multinational corporation J. C. Bamford).
- Maruti Suzuki
- Mercedes-Benz - manufactures luxury coaches in India.
- Piaggio
- Rosenbauer
- Scania
- Tatra
- Volvo

=== Defunct commercial vehicle manufacturers of India ===
- Automobile Products of India or API - founded in 1949 at Bombay (now Mumbai), by the British company Rootes Group, and later bought by M. A. Chidambaram of the MAC Group from Madras (now Chennai). The company manufactured Lambretta scooters, API Three Wheelers under licence from Innocenti of Italy and automobile ancillaries, notably clutch and braking systems. API's registered offices were earlier in Mumbai, later shifted to Chennai, in Tamil Nadu. The manufacturing facilities were located in Mumbai and Aurangabad in Maharashtra and in Ambattur, Chennai. The company has not been operational since 2002.
- Escorts Yamaha - in 1984 Escorts formed a joint venture with Yamaha to manufacture motorcycles. In 2008, it became India Yamaha Motor.
- Hero Motors is a former moped and scooter manufacturer based in Delhi, India. It is a part of multinational company Hero Group, which also currently owns Hero Motocorp (formerly Hero Honda) and Hero Cycles, among others. Hero Motors was started in the 1960s to manufacture 50cc two-stroke mopeds but gradually diversified into making larger mopeds, mokicks and scooters in the 1980s and the 1990s. Noteworthy collaborators and technical partners were Puch of Austria and Malaguti of Italy. Due to tightening emission regulations and poor sales, Hero motors have discontinued the manufacture of all gasoline powered vehicles and transformed itself into an electric two-wheeler and auto parts manufacturer.
- Ideal Jawa - motorcycle company based in Mysore, sold licensed Jawa and ČZ motorcycles beginning in 1960 under the brand name Jawa and later Yezdi.
- Kinetic Honda - a joint venture between Kinetic Engineering Limited, India and Honda Motor Company, Japan. The joint venture operated during 1984 - 1998, manufacturing 2-stroke scooters in India. In 1998, the joint venture was terminated after which Kinetic Engineering continued to sell the models under the brand name Kinetic until 2008 when the interests were sold to Mahindra.
- Mopeds India Limited - produces the Suvega range of Mopeds under technical collaboration with Motobécane of France.
- Standard - produced by Standard Motor Products in Madras from 1949 to 1988. Indian Standards were variations of vehicles made in the U.K. by Standard-Triumph.Standard Motor Products of India Ltd. (SMPI) was incorporated in 1948, and their first product was the Vanguard, which began to be assembled in 1949. The company was dissolved in 2006 and the old plant torn down.
- Tatra Vectra - Initial truck partnership with India by Vectra. Replaced by KamAZ. Tatra trucks for sale in India are now manufactured in collaboration with Bharat Earth Movers Limited.
- AMW
- KamAZ Vectra - A JV between Russia's KamAZ and the Vectra Group
- MAN Force - A JV between Force Motors and MAN AG (Germany)

== Electric vehicle and Hybrid vehicle (xEV) industry ==
During April 2012, the Indian government planned to unveil the road map for the development of domestic electric and hybrid vehicles (xEV) in the country. A discussion between the various stakeholders, including Government, industry, and academia, was expected to take place during 23–24 February. The final contours of the policy would have been formed after this set of discussions. Ministries such as Petroleum, Finance, Road Transport, and Power are involved in developing a broad framework for the sector. Along with these ministries, auto industry executives, such as Anand Mahindra (Vice Chairman and managing director, Mahindra & Mahindra) and Vikram Kirloskar (Vice-chairman, Toyota Kirloskar), were involved in this task. The Government has also proposed to set up a Rs 740 crore research and development fund for the sector in the 12th five-year plan during 2012–17. The idea is to reduce the high cost of key imported components such as the battery and electric motor, and to develop such capabilities locally. In the year 2017, An Amaravati, Andhra Pradesh based Electric Vehicles manufacturing company called AVERA New & Renewable Energy started electric scooters manufacturing and are ready to launch their two models of scooters by the end of December 2018.

Electric cars are seen as economical long-term investments, as one doesn't need to purchase gas, but needs only to recharge the battery, using renewable energy sources. According to the United States Department of Energy, electric cars produce half as much CO_{2} emissions as compared to a gas-powered car. According to The Economic Times, 60% of Indian customers expect fuel prices to go up in the next 12 months and 58% expect to buy a new car in the same time frame. Most consumers are looking to buy a car which gives good mileage. According to the same source, 68% of Asian drivers expect higher mileage from their cars due to the higher fuel prices. This has encouraged 38% of Indian automobile consumers to switch to electric or hybrid cars. Due to this change in the market, many companies, such as Toyota, have planned to introduce electric vehicles in India; and Suzuki has tested almost 50 electric prototypes in India already, according to Mashable. In 2019, Hyundai launched India's first electric car, the Kona Electric .

=== Electric vehicle manufacturers in India ===
- Ather Energy (plug-in electric scooter)
- Ajanta Oreva Group
- Bajaj Auto (autorickshaw, Scooter, LCV)
- Hero Electric (battery electric Scooter)
- Hyundai (cars)
- Mahindra (cars)
- JSW MG Motor (cars)
- Tara International
- Omega Seiki Mobility (3-wheelers)
- Tata Motors (cars, LCV)
- TVS Motor Company (plug-in electric scooter)
- Ola Electric (plug-in electric scooter)
- Okinawa Autotech (battery electric scooter)
- Euler Motors
- EKA Mobility (EKAM) (electric bus)

== Growth initiatives ==
=== Automotive Research Association of India (ARAI) and standards ===
The Government of India felt the need for a permanent agency to expedite the publication of standards and development of test facilities in parallel with the work of the preparation of the standards - as the development of improved safety critical parts could be undertaken only after the publication of the standard and commissioning of test facilities. The Ministry of Surface Transport (MoST) constituted a permanent Automotive Industry Standards Committee (AISC) . The Standards prepared by AISC will be approved by the permanent CMVR Technical Standing Committee (CTSC). After approval, the Automotive Research Association of India (ARAI) will publish this standard.

Intelligent Transport Systems (ITS) are globally proven systems to optimize the utilization of existing transport infrastructure and improve transportation systems in terms of efficiency, quality, comfort and safety. Having realized the potential of ITS, Government bodies and other organizations in India are presently working towards implementing various components of ITS across the country.

The first step taken for creation and implementation of ITS was holding a National Workshop titled "User Requirements for Interactive ITS Architecture", which was conducted as a collaboration between SIAM and ASRTU on 26 & 27 February 2015. This was primarily focused on ITS in Public Bus Transportation. Nonetheless, the workshop helped to create the outline for "National Intelligent Transport System Architecture and Policy for Public Transport (Bus)", which was submitted by ASRTU and SIAM to the government

In the 44th & 45th CMVR-TSC, Chairman had directed - standardization activities to be initiated on Intelligent Transportation Systems (ITS) - Vehicle Location Tracking, Camera Surveillance System and Emergency Request Button. The committee intended to extend the above user requirements to all public transportation namely –buses, taxis, etc. The current document covers the requirements for Vehicle Location Tracking and Emergency Button. The other ITS components like PIS, CCTV system, Fare collection etc. are deliberated and would be addressed in later phase and could be added as separate parts to the current document.

Based on these directions, the AISC Panel on ITS has prepared this AIS-140 titled,"Intelligent Transportation Systems (ITS) - Requirements for Public Transport Vehicle Operation". The panel also deliberated and identified the necessary elements for an effective implementation of vehicle level ITS system.

For AIS-140 Devices, in India, connectivity to report location, and Emergency Panic Button signal is through wireless cellular connectivity. There are device focused Cellular Connectivity Offerings like 'eSIM4Things' available in India, which cater to connectivity requirements of AIS-140 devices. eSIM4Things is fully compatible with all AIS-140 devices and with a connectivity manager and a range of tariff plans.

=== Bharat NCAP (BNCAP) ===
In August 2023, the Bharat New Car Assessment Program, also known as the Bharat NCAP or BNCAP, was launched as the official New Car Assessment Program for India. It was launched by Ministry of Road Transport and Highways (MoRTH).

=== Driverless Technology in India ===
While there is controversy on possibility of driverless cars in India, many startups are working on this technology.

In Auto Expo 2018, Hi Tech Robotic Systemz launched an artificial intelligence-based driver behaviour sensor technology called Novus Aware in partnership with Daimler India Commercial Vehicles (DICV).

=== Performance-linked incentives scheme for future tech ===
Automotive sector is part of 13 sectors that GoI has introduced Rs 1.97 lakh cr (US$28 b) performance-linked incentives (PLI) schemes for five years in 2021-22 budget. In Sept 2021, to boost the automotive industry with the newer and green technology the Government of India (GoI) launched 3 PLI schemes, a Rs. 26,000 cr (US$3.61 b) scheme for production of electric vehicles and hydrogen fuel vehicles (PEVHV), the Rs 18,000 crore (US$2.5 b) "Advanced Chemistry Cell" (ACC) scheme for new generation advance storage technologies which are useful for the electric vehicles, and Rs 10,000 crore (US$1.4 b) "Faster Adaption of Manufacturing of Electric Vehicles" (FAME) scheme to go green by expediting production of more electronic vehicles and replacement of other types of existing vehicles with the greener vehicles. The Rs. 26,000 cr (US$3.61 b) PLI scheme to boost automotive sector to boost the production of electric vehicles and hydrogen fuel vehicles will also generate 750,000 direct jobs in auto sector. These schemes will reduce pollution, climate change, carbon footprint, reduce oil and fuel import bill through domestic alternative substitution, boost job creation and economy. Society of Indian Automobile Manufacturers welcomed this as it will enhance the competitiveness and boost growth.

== See also ==
- Automobile industry
- Motorcycle industry in India
- Automotive Industry Standards, the automotive regulations of India
- Electric vehicle industry in India
- Electronics and semiconductor manufacturing industry in India
- Hydrogen economy in India
- Hydrogen internal combustion engine vehicle
- Lists of automobile-related articles
- List of car brands
- List of truck manufacturers
- List of motorcycle manufacturers (Category)
- List of scooters - List of scooter manufacturers
- List of countries by motor vehicle production
- List of countries by vehicles per capita
- List of Asian cars
- List of automobile manufacturers of China
- List of Japanese cars
- List of vehicle plants in India
- List of car magazines

== Bibliography ==
- Black, Anthony, et al. "The political economy of automotive industry development policy in middle income countries: A comparative analysis of Egypt, India, South Africa and Turkey." (2020). online
- Dhawan, Rajat, et al. "The auto component industry in India: Preparing for the future." (McKinsey & Company, Sep 2018). online
- Gupta, Sadanand (2012), Automobile Industry in India: A Cluster Approach, Ruby Press & Co., ISBN 978-81-922182-6-7
- Haneesh, Gaddipati Raama, and Abhishek Venkteshwar. "The Impact of COVID-19 on the Automotive Industry in India." International Journal of Management (IJM) 12.4 (2021). online
- Kamala, T.N. & Doreswamy, A.G. (2007). Strategies for Enhancing Competitiveness of Indian Auto Component Industries Archived 1 April 2010 at the Wayback Machine. Indian Institute of Management Kozhikode.
- Piplai, Tapas (28 July 2001). "Automobile Industry: Shifting Strategic Focus". Economic and Political Weekly. 36 (30). Mumbai, India: Sameeksha Trust: 2892–2897.
- Remesh, Babu P. "Re-reading the ‘Auto-revolution’in India with a Labour Lens: Shifting Roles and Positions of State, Industry and Workers." in Changing Contexts and Shifting Roles of the Indian State (Springer, Singapore, 2019) pp. 175–189.
- Rengamani, J. "A Study On The Factors Influencing The Job Stress Of Production Engineers In The Automobile Companies In Chennai." International Journal of Mechanical and ProductionEngineering Research and Development (IJMPERD) 8#5 (2018) pp. 427–436 online
- Saha, Priya, And Aruna Sharma. "Creating Value Through Customer Relationship Management In The Automotive Industry In India." CLEAR International Journal of Research in Commerce & Management 11.9 (2020).
- Shrestha, Shahadave. "Supplier development in Indian auto industry: Case of Maruti Suzuki India Limited." The Bulletin of the Graduate School, Soka University 39 (2019): 1–15. online
- Sureshkrishna, G., and D. Simanchala. "Occupational stress and job satisfaction: A Study of Automotive Industry in India." International Journal of Mechanical Engineering and Technology (IJMET) 9.2 (2018): 690–97.
- Tiku, Pran (2008). Six Sizzling Markets: How to Profit from Investing in Brazil, Russia, India, China, South Korea, and Mexico. John Wiley & Sons. ISBN 978-0-470-17888-1.
- Uppal, Nishant. "CEO narcissism, CEO duality, TMT agreeableness and firm performance: An empirical investigation in auto industry in India." European Business Review (2020). online
