= List of vehicle plants in India =

Automotive manufacturing plants in various Indian states

List of Automotive Manufacturing Plants in various States of India.

== Andhra Pradesh ==
List of automotive plants in Andhra Pradesh
Location	Manufacturer	Class
Sri City	Isuzu Motors India	Commercial vehicles
Sri City	Hero MotoCorp	Two wheelers
Vijayawada	Ashok Leyland Limited	Bus Manufacturing Unit
Sri City	Kobelco	Cranes, Excavators & back hoe loaders
Penukonda	Kia Motors	Passenger Vehicles
Vijayawada	AVERA New & Renewable Energy	Electric Two Wheelers

== Gujarat ==
List of automotive plants in Gujarat
Location	Manufacturer	Class
Becharaji, Mehsana	Maruti Suzuki India Limited	Passenger Vehicles
Sanand, Ahmedabad	Tata Motors	Passenger Vehicles
Chharodi, Ahmedabad	Tata Motors	Passenger Vehicles
Halol	JSW MG Motor India	Passenger Vehicles
Halol	Hero MotoCorp	Two Wheelers
Vithalapur, Ahmedabad	Honda Motorcycle and Scooter India	Two Wheelers
Halol	JCB India	Construction Equipment
Bhuj	Asia MotorWorks	Commercial vehicles
Shapar, Rajkot	Atul Auto	Three Wheelers
Kalyangadh, Ahmedabad	Atul Auto	Three Wheelers
Ahmedabad	Electrotherm	electric vehicles, including e-scooters and e-bikes
Anand, Gujarat	SML Mahindra	commercial vehicles
Ahmedabad	Gujarat Apollo Industries	construction equipment and vehicles

== Haryana ==
List of automotive plants in Haryana
Location	Manufacturer	Class
Dharuhera	Hero MotoCorp	Two wheelers
Gurgaon	Saera Electric Auto	Electric two wheelers, three wheelers, and golf carts
Gurgaon	Hero MotoCorp	Two wheelers
Faridabad	India Yamaha Motor	Two wheelers
Faridabad	Escorts Tractors	Farm Tractors and Agriculture Equipments
Faridabad	JCB	excavators
Manesar	Honda Motorcycle and Scooter India	Two wheelers
Gurgaon	Suzuki Motorcycle India Limited	Two wheelers
Gurgaon	Maruti Suzuki	Passenger vehicles
Manesar	Maruti Suzuki	Passenger vehicles
Kharkhoda	Maruti Suzuki	Passenger vehicles
Manesar	Revolt Motors (RattanIndia)	Two wheelers
Palwal	Euler Motors	Electric Commercial Vehicles

== Himachal Pradesh ==
List of automotive plants in Himachal Pradesh
Location	Manufacturer	Class
Nalagarh	TVS Motor Company	Two wheelers
Amb	International Cars & Motors Limited	Passenger vehicles
Parwanoo	TAFE Tractors	Commercial vehicles

== Jharkhand ==
List of automotive plants in Jharkhand
Location	Manufacturer	Class
Jamshedpur	Tata Motors	Commercial vehicles

== Karnataka ==
List of automotive plants in Karnataka
Location	Manufacturer	Class
Mysore	TVS Motor	Two wheelers
Kolar	Honda Motorcycle and Scooter India	Two wheelers
Bengaluru	Mahindra Reva	Passenger vehicles
Bidadi	Toyota Kirloskar Motor Private Limited	Passenger vehicles
Kolara	Scania Commercial Vehicles India Private Limited	Commercial vehicles
Doddaballapura	TAFE Tractors	Commercial vehicles
Dharwad	Tata Motors	Commercial vehicles
Bangalore	Veera Vahana	Commercial vehicles
Hoskote	Volvo Eicher Commercial Vehicles	Buses

== Kerala ==
List of automotive plants in Kerala
Location	Manufacturer	Class
Angamaly	Kerala Agro Machinery Corporation Limited (KAMCO)	Farm Tractors and Agriculture Equipments
Trivandrum	Kerala Automobiles Limited	Commercial Vehicles

== Madhya Pradesh ==
List of automotive plants in Madhya Pradesh
Location	Manufacturer	Class
Pithampur	Mahindra Two Wheelers	Two wheelers
Baggad	Volvo Eicher Commercial Vehicles	Commercial vehicles
Pithampur Domestic	Volvo Eicher Commercial Vehicles	Commercial vehicles
Dewas	Volvo Eicher Commercial Vehicles	Commercial vehicles
Pithampur SEZ	Volvo Eicher Commercial Vehicles	Commercial vehicles
Pithampur	CNH Industrial	Excavators, backhoe loaders
Bagroda, Bhopal	Volvo Eicher Commercial Vehicles	Commercial vehicles
Pithampur	Hindustan Motors	Commercial vehicles
Pithampur	MAN Force Trucks Private Limited	Commercial vehicles
Mandideep	TAFE Tractors	Commercial vehicles

== Maharashtra ==
List of automotive plants in Maharashtra
City	Location	Manufacturer	Class
Ahmednagar	Ahmednagar	Kinetic Watts and Volts Limited	Electric Two wheelers
Aurangabad	Aurangabad	Skoda Auto India Private Limited, Audi India	Passenger vehicles
Aurangabad	Aurangabad	Bajaj Auto	Commercial vehicles, Two wheelers
Aurangabad	Aurangabad bidkin	Ather Energy	Electric two wheelers
Aurangabad	Aurangabad Bidkin	Toyota Kirloskar Motors	Passenger vehicles
Aurangabad	Aurangabad Bidkin	JSW MG Motor India	Electric vehicles
Aurangabad	Aurangabad Bidkin	JSW Green Mobilty	Electric Bus, Truck
Banda	Banda	Caterpillar	Commercial
Bhandara	Bhandara	Ashok Leyland	Commercial vehicles
Kolhapur	Kolhapur	Brixton India	Two wheelers
Nagpur	Nagpur	Mahindra & Mahindra	Tractors
Nashik	Nashik	Mahindra & Mahindra	Passenger vehicles
Navi Mumbai	Navi Mumbai	Liebherr	Commercial vehicles
Pune	Akurdi	Bajaj Auto	Commercial vehicles
Pune	Baramati	Piaggio, Aprilia, Vespa	Commercial vehicles, Two Wheelers
Pune	Chakan	Mercedes-Benz India	Passenger vehicles
Pune	Chakan	Volkswagen India Private Limited	Passenger vehicles
Pune	Chakan	Bajaj Auto, KTM	Commercial vehicles, Two Wheelers
Pune	Chakan	Force Motors	Commercial vehicles
Pune	Chakan	JCB	Excavators
Pune	Chakan	Hyundai Construction Equipments	Excavators
Pune	Chakan	Sany India	Excavators
Pune	Chakan	Demag Cranes	Excavators
Pune	Chakan	eVtric	Electric Two wheelers
Pune	Chakan	Bajaj Auto	Two wheelers
Pune	Chakan	India Kawasaki Motors	Two wheelers
Pune	Chakan	Mahindra & Mahindra, Ssangyong	Passenger vehicles
Pune	Chakan	Beiqi Foton	Commercial vehicles
Pune	Chinchwad	Jaguar, Land Rover	Passenger vehicles
Pune	Chinchwad	Premier	Passenger vehicles
Pune	Chinchwad	Tata Motors	Passenger vehicles
Pune	Mundhava	Bharat Forge	Mine-Resistant Ambush Protected Vehicles
Pune	Ranjangaon	Tata Motors	Passenger vehicles
Pune	Ranjangaon, Pune	Fiat India Automobiles Limited, Jeep	Passenger vehicles
Pune	Talegaon Dabhade	Hyundai Motor India Limited	Passenger vehicles
Pune	Talegaon Dabhade	NEW HOLLAND INDIA	Tractors
Pune	Talegaon Dabhade	Larsen & Toubro	Excavators
Pune	Pargaon Khandala	Vedant Cranes	Excavators
Pune	Sanaswadi	John Deere	Agriculture equipment, Tractors
Pune	Chakan	Blue Energy Motors	Electric Truck, LNG truck
Pune	Chakan	Gensol Electric	Electric vehicles
Pune	Chakan	Pinacle Mobility	Electric vehicles
Satara	Satara	Cooper Corporation	Tractors
Thane	Thane	Volvo Eicher	Commercial vehicles
Wai	Wai	hyosung, Benelli	Two wheelers

== Odisha ==
List of automotive plants in Odisha
Location	Manufacturer	Class
Chandikhole	Omjay EV	Electric 2 Wheelers

== Punjab ==
List of automotive plants in Punjab
Location	Manufacturer	Class
Nawanshahar	SML Isuzu Limited	Commercial vehicles
Hoshiarpur	International Tractors Limited (Sonalika Group)	Farm Tractors & Agri Equipments
Mohali	Punjab Tractors Limited (Mahindra Group)	Farm Tractors & Agri Equipments
Morinda	Class India Limited	Agri Equipments
Patiala	John deere India Limited	Agri Equipments
Nabha	Preet Tractors Limited	Farm Tractors & Agri Equipments
Barnala	Standard Tractors Limited	Farm Tractors & Agri Equipments

== Rajasthan ==
List of automotive plants in Rajasthan
Location	Manufacturer	Class
Tapukara	Honda Cars India	Passenger vehicles
Alwar	Okinawa Autotech	Electric Vehicles
Alwar	Ashok Leyland Limited	Commercial vehicles
Alwar	TAFE Tractors	Commercial vehicles
Bhiwadi	Okinawa Autotech	Electric Vehicles
Neemrana	Hero MotoCorp	Two wheelers
Tapukara	Honda Motorcycle and Scooter India	Two wheelers
Jaipur	JCB	Excavators
Jaipur	Mahindra & Mahindra	Farm Tractors

== Tamil Nadu ==
List of automotive plants in Tamil Nadu
Location	Manufacturer	Class
Hosur	TVS Motor	Two wheelers
Chennai	Royal Enfield	Two wheelers
Chennai	India Yamaha Motor	Two wheelers
Chennai	Daimler, BharatBenz	Manufactures trucks and buses
Chennai	BMW India, Mini, BMW Motorrad	Passenger vehicles, Two wheelers
Chennai	Force Motors	Engines for BMW
Kanchipuram	Mahindra & Mahindra	Passenger vehicles
Chennai	Wrightbus	commercial vehicles
Oragadam, Chennai	Royal Enfield	Two wheelers
Thiruvallur, Chennai	Royal Enfield	Two wheelers
Avadi, Chennai	Heavy Vehicles Factory	Armed vehicles
Chennai	Isuzu	commercial vehicles
Chennai	Kubota	Tractors
Hosur	Ather Energy	Electric Vehicles
Krishnagiri	Ola Electric	Electric Vehicles
Ranipet	Ampere Electric	Electric Vehicles
Chennai	Schwing Stetter	Commercial vehicles
Chennai	Komatsu	Dump trucks and Medium-sized Excavators
Ambattur, Chennai	TI Cycles	Bicycles
Vellore	SAME Deutz-Fahr	Tractors
Sriperumbudur, Chennai	Hyundai Motor India Limited	Passenger vehicles
Hosur	Caterpillar Inc.	Commercial vehicles
Tiruvallur, Chennai	Mitsubishi, Groupe PSA	Passenger vehicles
Oragadam, Chennai	Renault India, Datsun, Nissan Motor India	Passenger vehicles
Ennore, Chennai	Ashok Leyland	Commercial vehicles
Hosur	Ashok Leyland	Commercial vehicles
Hosur	Kamaz Vectra Motors Limited	Commercial vehicles
Chennai	TAFE Tractors	Commercial vehicles
Kalladipatti	TAFE Tractors	Commercial vehicles
Hosur	TVS Motor	Commercial vehicles
Thiruvallur, Chennai	Caterpillar India Pvt. Ltd.	Commercial vehicles

== Telangana ==
List of automotive plants in Telangana
Location	Manufacturer	Class
Kodakachani, Medak District	Deccan Auto	Bus Manufacturing Plant
Zahirabad	Mahindra & Mahindra	Commercial vehicles

== Uttar Pradesh ==
List of automotive plants in Uttar Pradesh
Location	Manufacturer	Class
Greater Noida	India Yamaha Motor	Two wheelers
Greater Noida	New Holland Agriculture	Tractors
Lucknow	Tata Motors	Commercial vehicles

== Uttarakhand ==
List of automotive plants in Uttarakhand
Location	Manufacturer	Class
Haridwar	Hero MotoCorp	Two wheelers
Pantnagar	Bajaj Auto	Two wheelers
Pantnagar	Ashok Leyland	Commercial vehicles
Pantnagar	Tata Motors	Commercial vehicles
Haridwar	Mahindra & Mahindra	Commercial vehicles

== West Bengal ==
List of automotive plants in West Bengal
Location	Manufacturer	Class
Kharagpur	Tata Hitachi Construction Machinery	Construction Equipments
Changual, Kharagpur	TIL(Tractors India)	Construction equipment vehicles & Reach Stackers
Kamarhatty, Kolkata	TIL(Tractors India)	High capacity cranes

== See also ==
- Chakan, Pune
