= List of automobile manufacturers of India =

== Current domestic manufacturers ==
Brand	Operation	Parent company
Tata Motors	1945–present	Tata Group
Ashok Leyland	1948–present	Hinduja Group
Mahindra & Mahindra	1945–present	Mahindra Group
SML	1983–present	Mahindra Group
Eicher Motors	1948–present	
Bajaj Auto	1945–present	Bajaj Group
Force Motors	1958–present	Firodia Group

Minor companies

- Hradyesh (2011–present)
- ICML (2003–present)
- Kerala Automobiles Limited (1984–present)
- Tara International (1978–present)
- Vehicle Factory Jabalpur (1969–present)

== Foreign manufacturers or foreign companies in a joint venture with Indian manufacturers ==
Company	Operations	Parent company	Notes
Maruti Suzuki	1981–present	Suzuki	Founded by the Government of India in 1981, which owned it until 2007. It was sold to the Japanese automaker Suzuki Motor Corporation.
BMW India	2006–present	BMW	BMW has a manufacturing unit in Chennai, that began operations in 2007. BMW says that the plant runs on 100 percent green electricity. All of the M series and high-end models are not manufactured in India.
Mini India	2013–present	BMW	
Citroën India	2021–present	Stellantis	
Stellantis India	2016–present	Stellantis	
Honda Cars India	1995–present	Honda	
Hyundai Motor India	1996–present	Hyundai Motor Group	Foreign manufacturer with highest market share
Kia India	2017–present	Hyundai Motor Group	
Isuzu Motors India	2012–present	Isuzu	
Jaguar Land Rover India	2008–present	Tata Motors	
Mercedes-Benz India	1994–present	Mercedes-Benz	
JSW MG Motor India	2017–present	SAIC Motor/JSW Group	
Nissan Motor India	2005–present	Renault-Nissan-Mitsubishi Alliance	
Renault India	2005–present	Renault-Nissan-Mitsubishi Alliance	
Toyota Kirloskar Motor	1997–present	Toyota	A joint venture between Japan's Toyota and India's Kirloskar Group
Lexus India	2017–present	Toyota	
Volkswagen India	2007–present	Volkswagen Group	
Audi India	2007–present	Volkswagen Group	
Porsche India	2004–present	Volkswagen Group	
Škoda India	2001–present	Volkswagen Group	
Volvo India	1998–present	Volvo	

== Former manufacturers ==
- Chinkara Motors (2003–2016)
- Rajah Motors (1981–2009)
- Premier Automobiles Limited (1944–2019)
- San Motors (1996–2013)
- Sipani (1978–1997)
- Standard Motor Products (1948–2006)
- Hindustan Motors (1942-2014)

=== Former foreign manufacturers & joint ventures ===
- Daewoo Motors India (1995–2003)
- Ford India (1995–2021)
- General Motors India (1995–2017)

== See also ==
- Automotive industry in India
- List of car manufacturers
