= EKA Mobility =

Indian electric vehicle manufacture

- Type: Private
- ISIN: INE0SF503017
- Industry: Electric vehicles
- Founded: July 2019; 7 years ago in Pune, Maharastra, India
- Founder: Sudhir Mehta
- Area served: Worldwide
- Key people: • Sudhir Mehta (Chairman)
- Products: • Electric buses • Electric small commercial vehicles
- Owner: Dr. Sudhir Mehta & family (Promoter & Majority)
- Number of employees: 6000+
- Parent: Pinnacle Mobility Solutions Private Limited
- Website: ekamobility.com

EKA Mobility is an Indian electric vehicle manufacturer headquartered in Pune, Maharashtra.

The company was founded in 2019 as a subsidiary of Pinnacle Industries, an automotive components manufacturer.

EKA Mobility specializes in the production of electric buses and electric small commercial vehicles.

== History ==
Pinnacle Mobility Solutions Private Limited was incorporated on 2 July 2019 as a non-government company and is registered under the Registrar of Companies, Pune. It operates as a subsidiary of Pinnacle Industries.

EKA was launched by Pinnacle Industries to cater to the growing demand for electric mobility solutions.

== Operations and products ==
EKA Mobility specializes in the production of electric buses and small commercial vehicles.

EKA has also collaborated with the Dutch conglomerate VDL Group.

== Investments ==
In 2023, Japan's Mitsui & Co. invested Rs 600 crore in EKA Mobility to support its electric vehicle expansion plans. This was Mitsui's second investment into the company.

== Leadership ==
EKA Mobility is led by Sudhir Mehta, the chairman and managing director of Pinnacle Industries. Additionally, Lakshminarayan, Chairman of TVS Automotive Systems Limited, and Rashmi Urdhwareshe, former director of ARAI, are members of the advisory board.

== See also ==
- • Electric vehicle industry in India
- • Production-Linked Incentive (PLI) Scheme
