= Simple Energy (vehicle company) =

Indian electric vehicle manufacturer

Simple Energy Ltd.
- Type: Private
- Founded: 2019; 7 years ago
- Founder: Suhas Rajkumar
- Headquarters: Bengaluru, Karnataka, India
- Area served: India
- Key people: Kiran Poojary, Shreshth Mishra
- Products: Simple One; Simple OneS; Two wheeler
- Number of employees: 500
- Website: simpleenergy.in

Simple Energy is an electric vehicle (EV) start-up based in Bangalore, India, founded by Suhas Rajkumar in 2019. It is headquartered in Bangalore, India.

== History ==
Simple Energy produced its first electric scooter in 2019, followed by their main product, Simple One, in 2023.

The company opened a new manufacturing facility in Shoolagiri, Tamil Nadu, in January 2023. It had a round of fund raising in July 2024.Recently, they have started commercially manufacturing the country's first rare earth free motors at its Hosur, Tamil Nadu production facility.
