= European Clean Hydrogen Alliance =

The European Clean Hydrogen Alliance (ECH2A) is a stakeholder platform launched by the European Commission in July 2020, as part of the EU Hydrogen Strategy, and is currently coordinated by the Directorate-General for Internal Market, Industry, Entrepreneurship and SMEs (DG GROW). Its main goal is to accelerate the large-scale deployment of clean hydrogen technologies by 2030, supporting the EU's climate neutrality objectives and industrial competitiveness.

The ECHA brings together over 1,400 stakeholders along the hydrogen value chain, grouped in three roundtables focused on production, infrastructure (transmission, distribution and storage), and end-use. It maintains a pipeline of over 400 projects across the European Union to facilitate investment and showcase hydrogen projects. Only infrastructure investments capable of meeting the thresholds set by Directive (EU) 2023/2413 (a reduction of CO₂ emissions generated over the full life cycle of the fuels of at least 73.4%, equivalent to 3 tCO₂/tH₂) may be admitted into the project pipeline.

== Funding and IPCEI Support ==
The Alliance complements the Important Projects of Common European Interest (IPCEI) framework. As of May 2024, 113 projects were approved for State aid for up to €20 billion in public support and were expected to attract €19 billion in private investment.

IPCEI clusters:

- Hy2Tech (technology)
- Hy2Use (industrial applications)
- Hy2Move (mobility)
- Hy2Infra (infrastructure)
