= Wirtgen =

Wirtgen is a German surname. It may refer to:

- Ferdinand Paul Wirtgen (1848–1924), German pharmacist and botanist; son of Philipp Wilhelm Wirtgen
- Philipp Wilhelm Wirtgen (1806–1870), German botanist and teacher; father of Ferdinand Paul Wirtgen

Wirtgen may also refer to:

- Wirtgen Group, an international mining, recycling, and road construction equipment company headquartered in Germany and subsidiary of John Deere.
