= Atul Auto =

Indian automobile company

Atul Auto Limited
- Type: Public
- Traded as: BSE: 531795; NSE: ATULAUTO
- Industry: Automotive
- Headquarters: Rajkot, Gujarat, India
- Products: Auto rickshaw, Tuktuk
- Number of employees: 575 (31 March 2025)
- Subsidiaries: Atul Greentech
- Website: atulauto.co.in

Atul Auto Limited is an Indian three wheeler (auto rickshaw, tuk-tuk, e-rickshaw) manufacturing company based in Rajkot.

== History ==
The company's origins lie in the 1970s, when Jagjivanbhai Chandra sought to modify motorcycles to make transport to meet the needs of rural areas of Saurashtra, and adapted the engines from golf carts scrapped by the Maharaja of Jamnagar, resulting in his first chhakada vehicles. The company incorporated in 1986, and production begin in 1992.

Atul Auto has its manufacturing facilities at Rajkot and Ahmedabad.
