= Pithampur =

- Town
- Pithampur
- Nickname: Detroit of India
- Location in Madhya Pradesh, India Pithampur (India)
- Coordinates: 22°37′11″N 75°41′36″E
- Country: India
- State: Madhya Pradesh
- District: Dhar

Government
  - Body: Indore Metropolitan Region

Area
  - Total: 200 km^{2} (77 sq mi)
  - Rank: 25

Population (2011)
  - Total: 126,099
  - Rank: 25
  - Density: 630/km^{2} (1,600/sq mi)

Languages
  - Official: Hindi
- Time zone: UTC+5:30 (IST)
- PIN: 454775
- Telephone code: 0729252
- Vehicle registration: MP11

Pithampur is a town near Dhar city in the Dhar district of Madhya Pradesh, India. Pithampur is an industrial city, and is a part of Indore Metropolitan Region. Pithampur houses major industries and companies of Madhya Pradesh.

== Demographics ==
As of the 2011 Census of India, Pithampur had a population of 1,26,099. Males constitute 58% of the population and females 42%. Pithampur has an average literacy rate of 62%, higher than the national average of 59.5%:- male literacy is 73%, and female literacy is 47%. In Pithampur, 18% of the population is under 6 years of age.

== Pithampur Industrial Area ==
Pithampur has an Industrial area. Parts of Pithampur Industrial area hosts several Large Scale Industries like Pinnacle Industries Limited.

== Transport ==
The nearest airport is Indore.
