= Tara International =

Indian marketer for Tara Green Auto

- Industry: Automotive
- Headquarters: Mumbai, India
- Key people: Tara S. Ganguly
- Products: Automobiles
- Parent: Bengal Enamal
- Website: www.tarainternational.us/index.php

Tara International, a subsidiary of Bengal Enamal, located in Mumbai, India, is the marketer for Tara Green Auto, a producer of battery electric vehicles to include two, three and four wheel designs. Tara S. Ganguly is the current managing director.

== Products ==
Tara International offers a range of battery electric vehicles. Its product line includes Electric bicycles, electric scooters, and Electric ATVs, as well as BEV Trikes and BEV cars. The company proposes to import 60–70% of components from China and manufacture the remainder in India The product range also includes buses with capacity for up to 52 seats and commercial vehicles such as golf carts.

== Retrofitting ==
Tara will remove the existing petrol, diesel, CNG, or LPG engine and put the EV motor and batteries in most vehicles, but this depends on the vehicle's condition.
