= India Kawasaki Motors =

Indian motorcycle retailer

India Kawasaki Motors Private Limited
- Type: Private company
- Industry: Automotive
- Founded: 1 July 2010; 16 years ago
- Headquarters: Pune, Maharashtra, India
- Key people: Naoki Matsumoto - Managing Director
- Products: Motorcycles, scooters, sports bikes
- Number of employees: 300
- Parent: Kawasaki Heavy Industries
- Website: www.kawasaki-india.com

India Kawasaki Motors Private Limited (IKM) is an Indian motorcycle retailer. It was established in May 2010 in Pune, Maharashtra, as a wholly owned subsidiary of Kawasaki Heavy Industries for imports and sales of motorcycles. Kawasaki made a technical assistance agreement with Bajaj Auto Ltd. in 1984, and cooperated to expand production and sales of motorcycles in India. In November 2016 India Kawasaki Motors decided to break ties with Bajaj Auto Ltd. for sales and service from April 2017 and sell its motorcycles through its own network.

India Kawasaki Motors currently sells the Ninja 300, Ninja 400, Ninja 650, Ninja 1000, Z650, Z650 RS, Z900, ZH2, ZH2 SE, Versys 650, Versys 1000, Vulcan S, Ninja ZX-10R, Ninja H2, Ninja H2R and Ninja H2 Carbon are sold through Kawasaki exclusive dealerships. In the past, Kawasaki manufactured commuter bikes such as KB100, 4S Champion, KB125, Boxer, Aspire, Caliber, Wind and Eliminator jointly with Indian partner Bajaj Auto Ltd. IKM’s annual capacity currently stands at 2,500-3,000 units.

== Vehicles ==
=== Sports Bikes ===
- Ninja H2R
- Ninja H2
- Ninja H2 CARBON
- Ninja ZX-14R
- Ninja ZX-10RR
- Ninja ZX-10R
- Ninja ZX-6R
- Ninja 1000
- Ninja 1100SX
- Ninja H2 SX
- Ninja H2 SX SE
- Ninja 650
- Ninja 300
- Ninja 500
- Ninja ZX-4R
- Ninja ZX-4RR
- ZH2
- ZH2 SE
- Z900
- Z650
- Versys 1000
- Versys 1100
- Versys 650
- Versys X-300

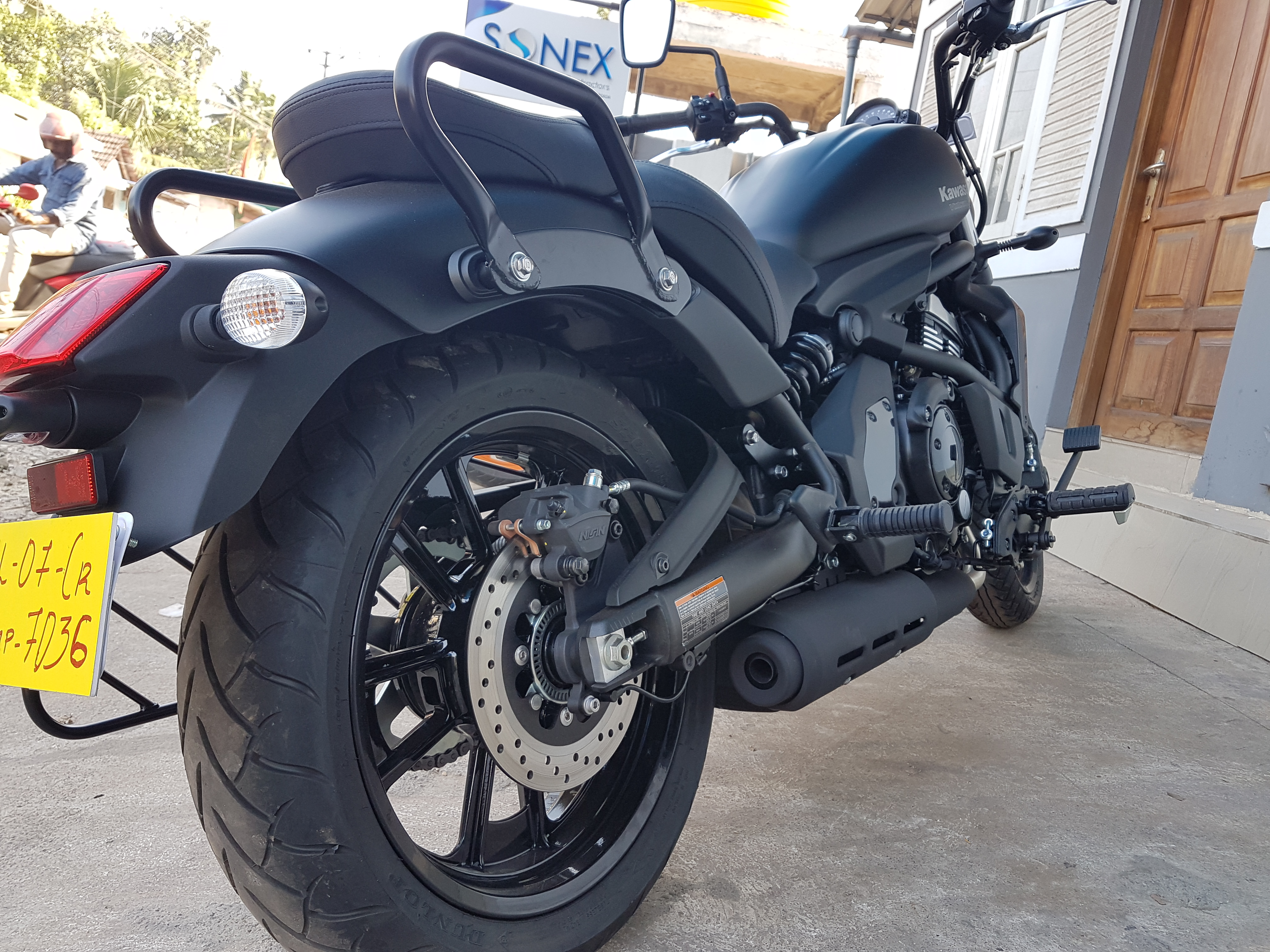
Vulcan S

=== Cruiser Bike ===
- Vulcan S
- Eliminator 500
- W175

=== Dirt Bikes ===
- KLX 110
- KLX 140
- KX 65
- KX 85
- KLX 230
- KLX 450R
- KX 100
- KX 250
- KX 450F

== Discontinued ==
=== Motorcycles/Sports Bikes ===
- Kawasaki Ninja 250R
- Kawasaki ER-6N 650
- Kawasaki Z800
- Kawasaki KB100
- Kawasaki Boxer
- Kawasaki Caliber
- Kawasaki Caliber 115
- Kawasaki Caliber Croma
- Kawasaki Aspire
- Kawasaki Wind 125
- Kawasaki 4S Champion
- Kawasaki Z250
- Kawasaki KZ440
- Kawasaki Ninja 400
