= Euler Motors =

Indian electric vehicle company

- Type: Private
- Founded: 2018; 8 years ago
- Founder: Saurav Kumar
- Headquarters: New Delhi, India
- Area served: Delhi; Bangalore; Hyderabad; Chandigarh; Pune
- Key people: Saurav Kumar (CEO)
- Products: Three-wheeler electric vehicles; Light commercial vehicle
- Brands: NEO
- Website: www.eulermotors.com/en/

Euler Motors is an electric vehicle (EV) start-up based in Delhi, and was founded by Saurav Kumar in 2018. It is headquartered in Delhi, India.

== Awards ==
Euler Motors is the winner of Apollo Awards, 2022 and also the winner of Businessworld's Auto World 40 Under 40 Winners felicitated by Nitin Gadkari, Union Minister of Road Transport & Highways.
