= Mercedes-Benz India =

Automobile manufacturer company

Mercedes-Benz India Pvt. Ltd.
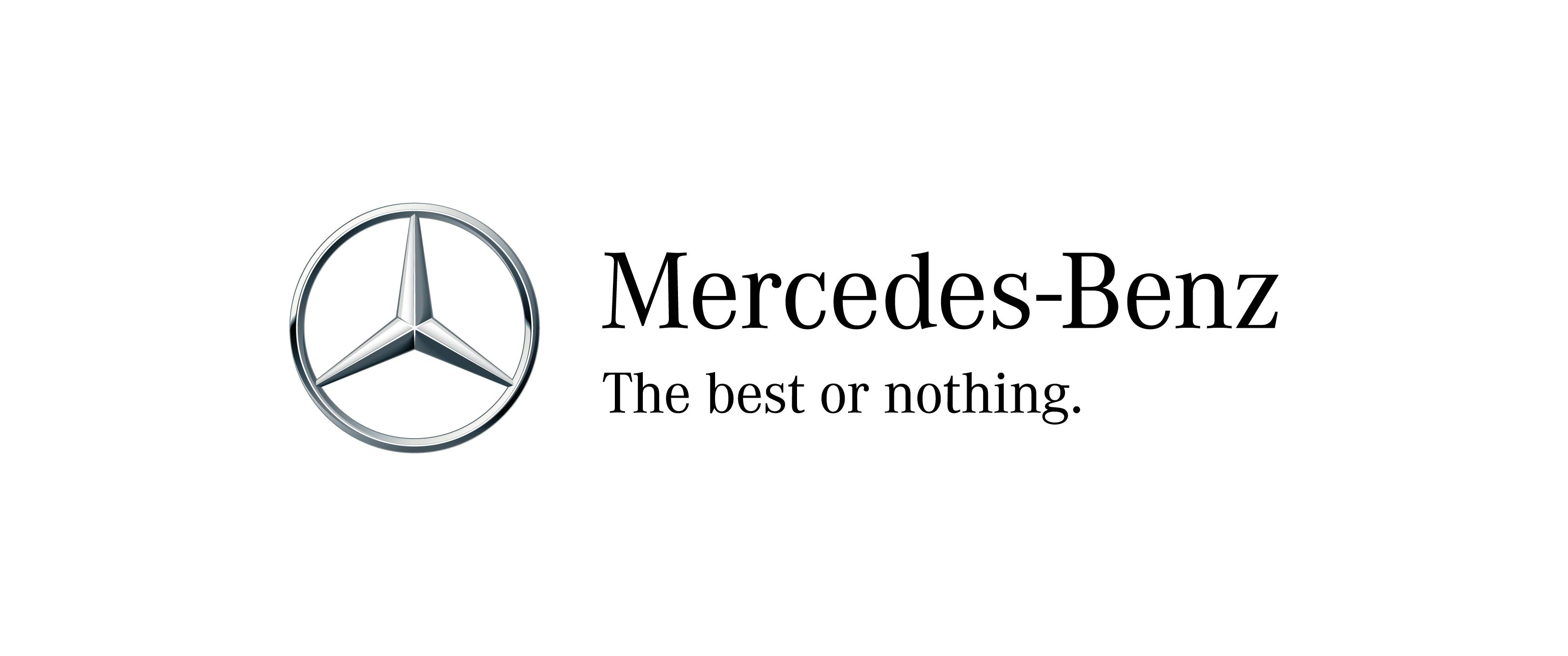
- Type: Subsidiary
- Industry: Automotive
- Founded: 1994; 32 years ago in Pune, India
- Headquarters: Chakan, Pune, India
- Key people: Santosh Iyer (CEO); Emrah Ozer (CFO)
- Products: Luxury vehicles
- Production output: ▲16,497 (2023)
- Revenue: ▲₹10,450 crore (US$1.1 billion) (2023)
- Net income: ▲₹884 crore (US$92 million) (2023)
- Parent: Mercedes-Benz Group
- Website: mercedes-benz.co.in

Mercedes-Benz India Pvt. Ltd. is a wholly owned subsidiary of the German Mercedes-Benz Group founded in 1994, with headquarters in Pune, Maharashtra, India. It is the first luxury automotive brand to officially enter the Indian market.

== History ==
Daimler established Mercedes-Benz India Ltd. in 1994, signing a venture with TELCO for local production of vehicles. It was the first German luxury brand to officially enter the Indian market after launching the W124 Mercedes-Benz E-Class, marking entry of luxury brand segment in India. However, the car was not a success due to public perception, as Mercedes Benz had transitioned to the W210 E-Class globally, but over the years, the W124 has been positively received for reliability and simplicity. Mercedes Benz eventually launched the W210 E-class in 1998 and produced the car in partnership with TELCO with CKD kits.

Mercedes-Benz India is a wholly owned subsidiary of the Daimler AG.

The company is headquartered in Chakan, Pune, Maharashtra. In 2022, Daimler split into two separate entities, one focusing on passenger vehicles under the newly formed Mercedes-Benz Group moniker and the other on commercial vehicles as Daimler Trucks.

== Products ==
Mercedes-Benz started assembly and manufacturing in India in 1994 based in New Delhi under Pushpindar Singh Chopra. Mercedes-Benz launched its new used car brand, Mercedes-Benz Certified in India in December 2014 with the simultaneous inauguration of 12 new Mercedes-Benz Certified outlets across India.

In 2020, Mercedes-Benz manufactured AMG vehicles and produced three AMG models: the AMG GLC 43 4MATIC Coupe, the AMG A 35 4MATIC+ saloon, and the AMG GLA 35 4MATIC+ SUV. In 2021, Mercedes-Benz India launched a new used car online platform called Mercedes-Benz Marketplace. In 2022, India became the first market for Mercedes-Benz outside of Germany to locally manufacture the flagship luxury EV, the EQS 580. This was the 14th type of Mercedes-Benz automobile to be locally assembled by the company.

In 2022, the company launched the EQS 580; the EQS 580 4Matic has an ARAI-certified range of 857 km. Mercedes-Benz launched its fourth electric vehicle for India, the EQB, with a 7-seat layout. As of 2022, Mercedes-Benz India has set up 35 Ultra-Fast Chargers across India.

=== Models ===
- Mercedes-Benz C-Class
- Mercedes-Benz E-Class
- Mercedes-Benz S-Class
- Mercedes-Benz V-Class
- Mercedes-Benz G-Class
- Mercedes-Benz CLE
- Mercedes-Benz GLA-Class
- Mercedes-Benz GLC-Class
- Mercedes-Benz GLE-Class
- Mercedes-Benz GLS-Class
- Mercedes-Benz EQS
- Mercedes-Benz EQS SUV
- Mercedes-Maybach
- Mercedes-AMG

== Projects ==
=== Retail of the Future ===
Mercedes-Benz India launched Retail of the Future in 2021. Mercedes-Benz sells cars directly to buyers.

=== Mercedes-Benz Research and Development India ===
Mercedes-Benz Research and Development India (MBRDI) is a research and development centre for Mercedes-Benz Group AG outside of Germany. It was established in 1996 in Bengaluru and Pune.

== Sales performance ==
Mercedes-Benz India recorded its highest ever sales in 2024. The company delivered 19,565 new cars to customers, with a year-on-year growth of 12.4%. Mercedes-Benz India has a network of 47 Indian cities.
