= Kerala Automobiles Limited =

Trivandrum based auto manufacturing factory

Kerala Automobiles Limited (KAL)
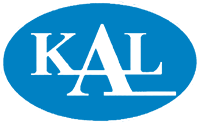
- Company type: Public Sector
- Industry: Automotive
- Founded: 1978; 48 years ago
- Headquarters: Aralummoodu PO, Neyyattinkara, Thiruvananthapuram- 695123
- Area served: Kerala, India
- Key people: Pulluvila Stanly (Chairman); V. S. Rajeev (Managing Director)
- Products: Autorickshaws; Pickup-Vans; Tipper
- Owner: Government of Kerala
- Website: KAL

Kerala Automobiles Limited (KAL) is a public sector automobile manufacturing company in Thiruvananthapuram, Kerala, India. The KAL undertakes the manufacturing and marketing of various models of Three Wheelers. The company is ISO 9001:2015 certified.

== Overview ==
KAL products include Pick up Van, Delivery Vans, Hydraulic Tippers, etc., and exports three-wheeler vehicles to Egypt.

== Models ==
- Kerala Neem G
- Kerala Green Stream
- Electric Pick-up Van
- Electric Tipper Van
