= Isuzu Motors India =

Indian car manufacturer and seller

Isuzu Motors India Private Limited
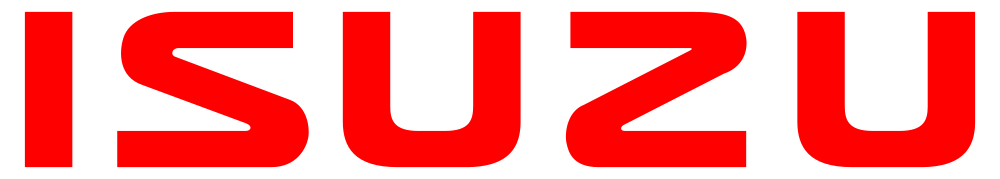
- Company type: Private
- Industry: Automotive
- Founded: August 2012
- Headquarters: Chennai, India
- Key people: Rajesh Mittal (Managing Director); Takeshi Hirano (Deputy Managing Director)
- Products: Pick-up vehicles for both commercial & personal segments and Sports Utility Vehicles
- Owner: Isuzu
- Parent: Isuzu
- Website: Isuzu India

Isuzu Motors India Private Limited is a subsidiary of Isuzu, Japan was established in August 2012 in India having its manufacturing plant in Sri City, now in Tirupati district, Andhra Pradesh 55KM away from Chennai. The Corporate Head Office is present in Vadapalani, Chennai. Isuzu currently sells a range of Isuzu D-Max pick-up trucks that includes variants like Regular Cab Flat Deck and S-CAB. Isuzu also sells the (1st Gen – Facelifted) MU-X, a large sized Sports Utility Vehicle (SUV) in automatic transmission in India. Both vehicle models are available through Isuzu's exclusive dealer outlets.

Isuzu Motors India unveiled the ISUZU D-MAX V-Cross, India's first adventure utility vehicle at the Auto Expo 2016. The V-Cross has been positioned as a lifestyle pick-up and can be registered as a personal vehicle. In Dec-2020 Isuzu Motors India launched a contest for existing Indian businesses and startups with an aim to reward the best business idea using the Isuzu D-Max as a trusted business partner, by giving away the Isuzu D-Max Super Strong variant as the prize to kick-start their venture.

The company has so far established its network with 43 dealer outlets in the country including key cities such as Delhi, Jaipur, Gurugram, Mumbai, Chennai, Bengaluru, Hyderabad, Trivandrum, Coimbatore, Mangalore, Madurai, Visakhapatnam, Tirupati, Cochin, Calicut, Ahmedabad, Rajkot, Ludhiana, Lucknow, Indore, Vadodara, Kolkata, Jalandhar, Jodhpur, Mohali, Nagpur, Vijayawada, Rajahmundry, Faridabad and Pune. The current products are sold through these dedicated Isuzu outlets to cater to the market demand for pick-up trucks. Isuzu Motors India has plans to increase its dealer outlets significantly in future.

Isuzu Motors India signed a MoU with the Andhra Pradesh Government to facilitate investments by its nominated supplier partners in the state. The auto component companies signed MoUs to explore possibilities of appropriate investments in the state and to cater to the requirements of the OEMs having their manufacturing facilities in the state.

Isuzu Motors Limited, Japan – headquartered in Tokyo, is a global manufacturer of light, medium and heavy commercial vehicles, utility vehicles and diesel engines. The company has operations in over 25 countries, selling in more than 100 countries worldwide. The company has significant market share in pickups and pickup based derivatives in many markets. The company manufactures and sells over 6 lakh vehicles annually across the world. Isuzu has been in the diesel engine field for long time and had built over 23 million diesels since its predecessor developed Japan's first air-cooled automotive diesel engine in 1936.

== Manufacturing facility ==
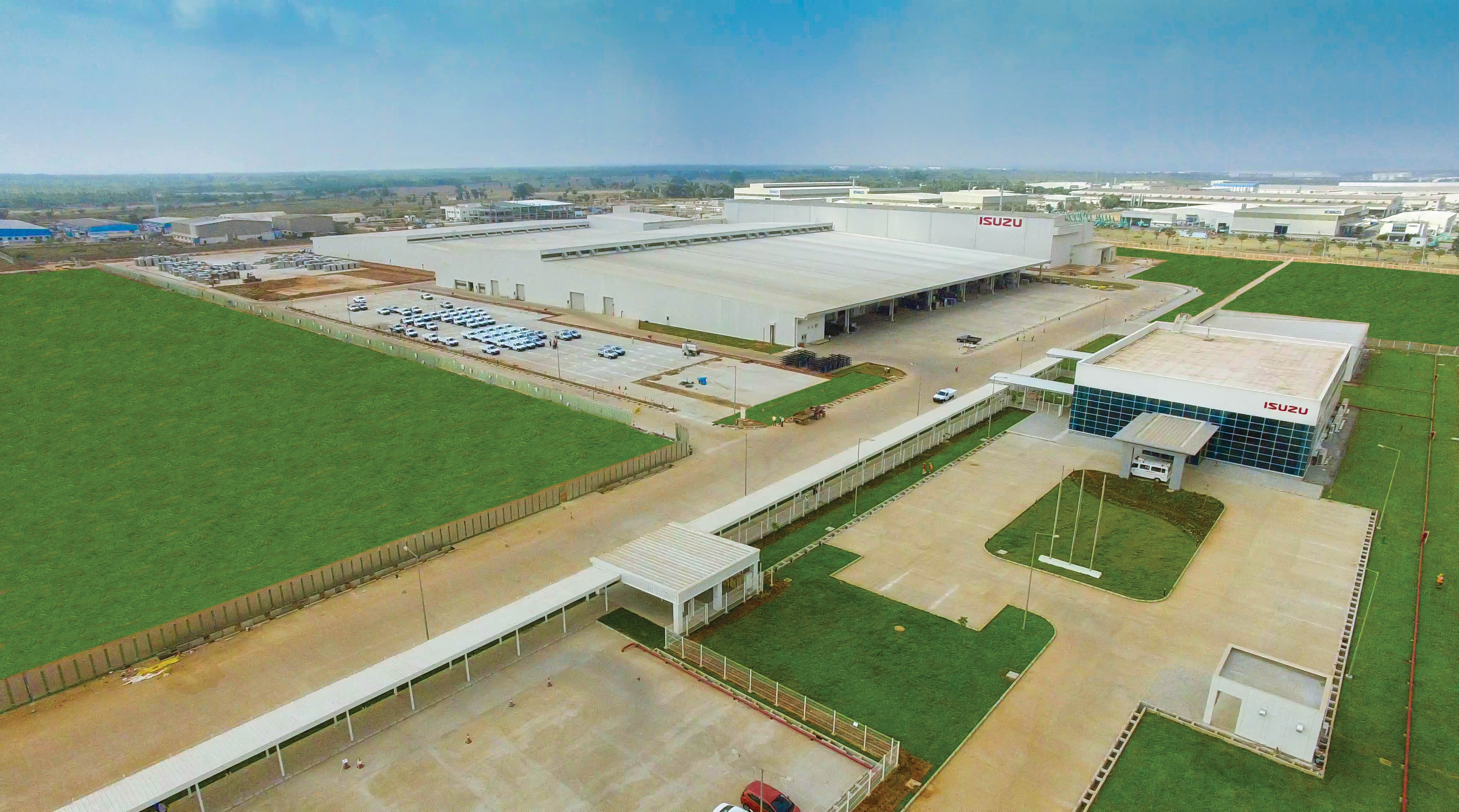
Isuzu Motors India manufacturing plant aerial view

Officials of Isuzu and the state government signed the MoU here in the presence of Chief Minister Kiran Kumar Reddy on 15 March 2013 to set up a manufacturing facility in Sricity, Chittoor District. Isuzu Motors India inaugurated its manufacturing plant at Sri City, Andhra Pradesh which is located in chittoor district on 27 April 2016. The first locally made Isuzu D-Max and V-Cross rolled out from the assembly lines on the day of the inauguration in April 2016.

== History ==
Since its inception in 1916, the company – Tokyo Ishikawajima Shipbuilding and Engineering Co., Ltd, has been in the field of manufacturing automobiles. The company later in 1934 named its truck 'Isuzu' which was then altered and the company was reorganised to 'Isuzu Motors Limited' in the year 1949 with a capital of 150 million yen. Since then, the company grew with the introduction of new products and diesel engines for the commercial and passenger vehicle segments, across the globe.
