= Redigo =

Redigo may refer to:

- Redigo (TV series), a 1963 Western dramatic series
- Aermacchi M-290 RediGO, a 1985–1995 Finnish-Italian turboprop-powered military basic trainer and liaison aircraft
- Datsun redi-GO, a 2016–present Japanese-Indian city car
