= Dongfeng Nammi =

Chinese electric vehicle manufacturer

Dongfeng Automobile Nammi Technology
- Native name: 东风汽车纳米科技有限公司
- Formerly: Dongchuang Zilian (Wuhan) New Energy Technology
- Type: State-owned enterprise
- Industry: Automotive
- Founded: 2020; 6 years ago
- Headquarters: Shiyan, Hubei, China
- Key people: Chen Meng (general manager)
- Products: Passenger cars
- Owner: Dongfeng Motor Corporation (100%)
- Website: www.dna-nev.com.cn

Dongfeng Nammi, (Chinese: 东风纳米, literally: East wind Nanometre) previously known as Dongchuang Zilian (Wuhan) New Energy Technology (东创紫联), is the electric vehicle division of Chinese State-owned automaker Dongfeng Motor Corporation, specializing in designing and developing budget electric cars.

The company used to be specifically responsible for the domestic sales of electric passenger vehicles produced by eGT New Energy Automotive, a joint venture between Dongfeng and Renault-Nissan Alliance, but became an independent brand which has its own production base since 2023. The vehicles of Dongfeng Nammi shares the production line and supply chain with eGT New Energy Automotive in Shiyan city of Hubei.

== History ==
Dongchuang Zilian (Wuhan) New Energy Technology was established on October 28, 2020, with Dongfeng Group holding 100% of the shares. It was primarily responsible for the domestic sales of vehicles manufactured by eGT New Energy Automotive Co., Ltd. in China. It used to be a sales company.

In February 2023, Dongchuang Zilian was renamed as Dongfeng Motor Nammi Technology Co., Ltd. Following this renaming, Dongfeng Nami officially assumed the role of a second-tier unit within the Dongfeng Motor Group, embarking on an independent path of brand operation.

During the same month, Dongfeng Nami announced the investment a total of 5.31 billion Yuan in establishing a production base in Xiangyang, Hubei Province. Another vehicle production base is in Shiyan city of Hubei. Dongfeng Nami also announced its S3 platform, an EV architecture focus on the pure electric small car platform specially developed by Dongfeng Motor for Dongfeng Nammi.

In August 2023, Dongfeng Motor formally launched its pure-electric vehicle brand, Dongfeng Nammi, dedicated to small-sized battery electric vehicle, along with its Nammi 01. Unlike the company's previous models, Nano EX1 and Nano Box which were developed by eGT, the Nammi 01 is the first vehicle developed by the company.

== Products ==
=== Current models ===
- Nammi 01 (2024–present), subcompact hatchback
- Nammi 06 (2025–present), compact SUV
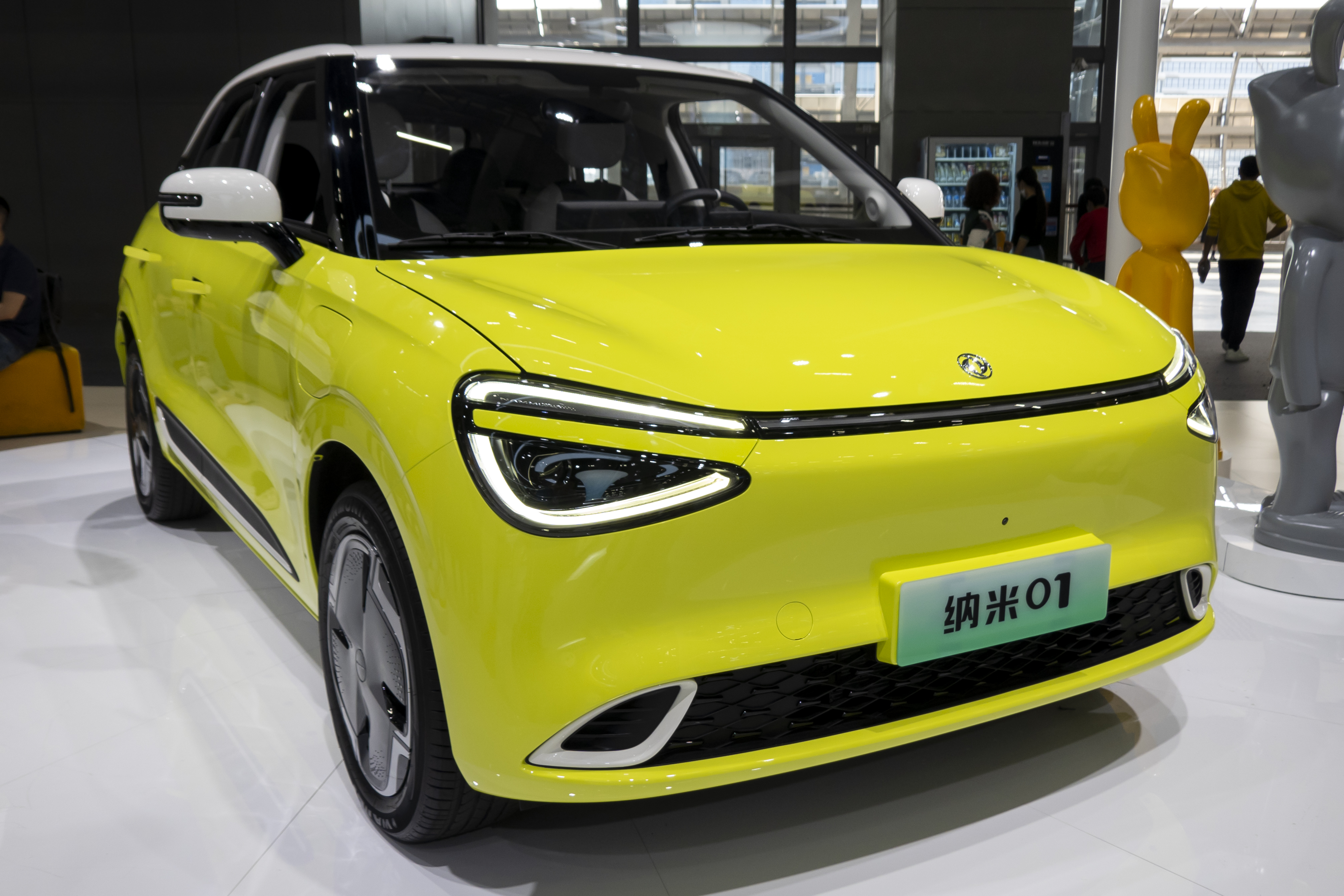
Nammi 01

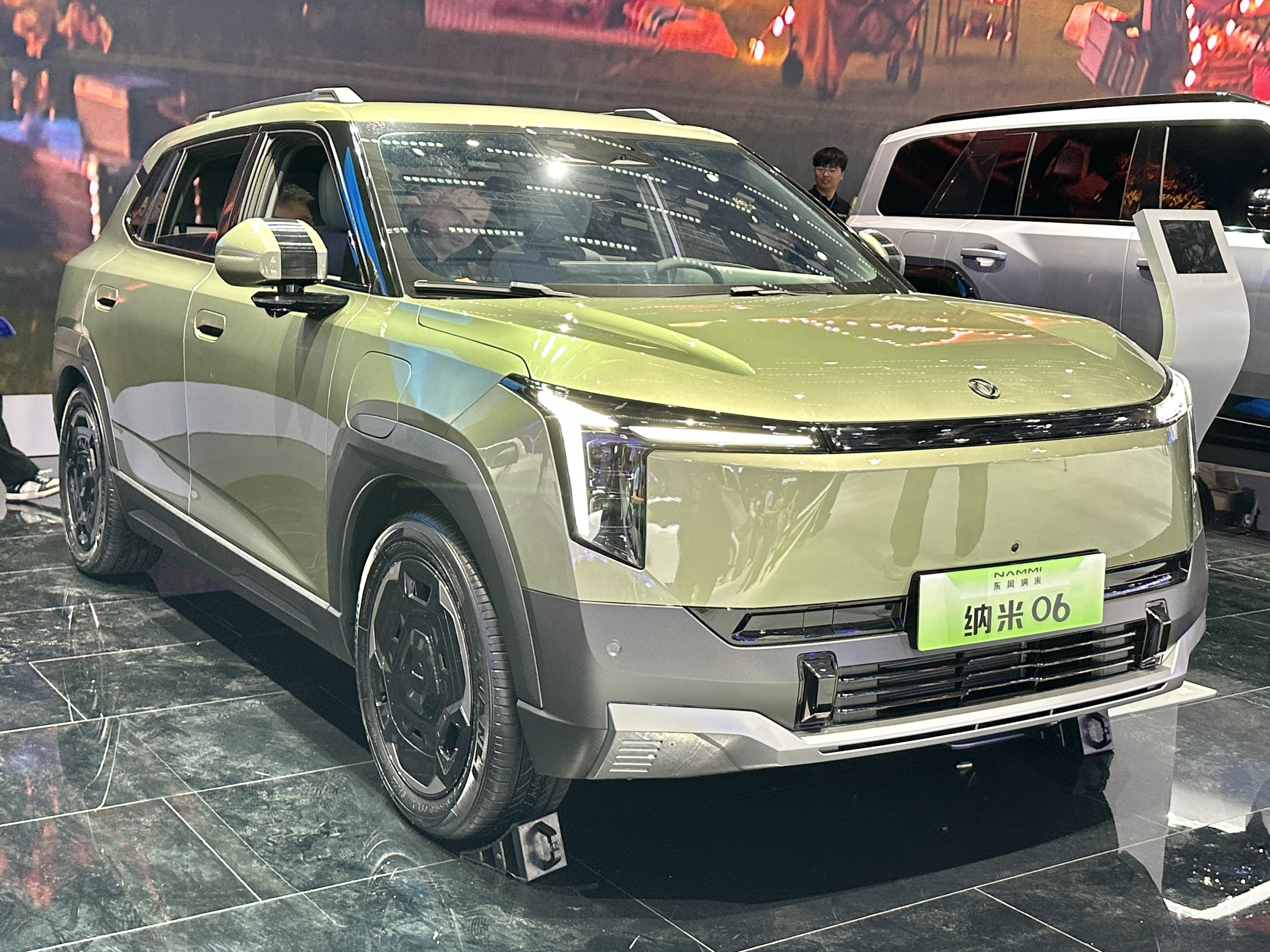
Nammi 06

=== Discontinued models ===
- Nano EX1 (2020–2024), city car, also rebadged as Aeolus EX1, Forthing T1, Fengon E1, Dacia Spring, Renault City K-ZE, Nissan Venucia E30
- Nano Box (2022–2024), city car
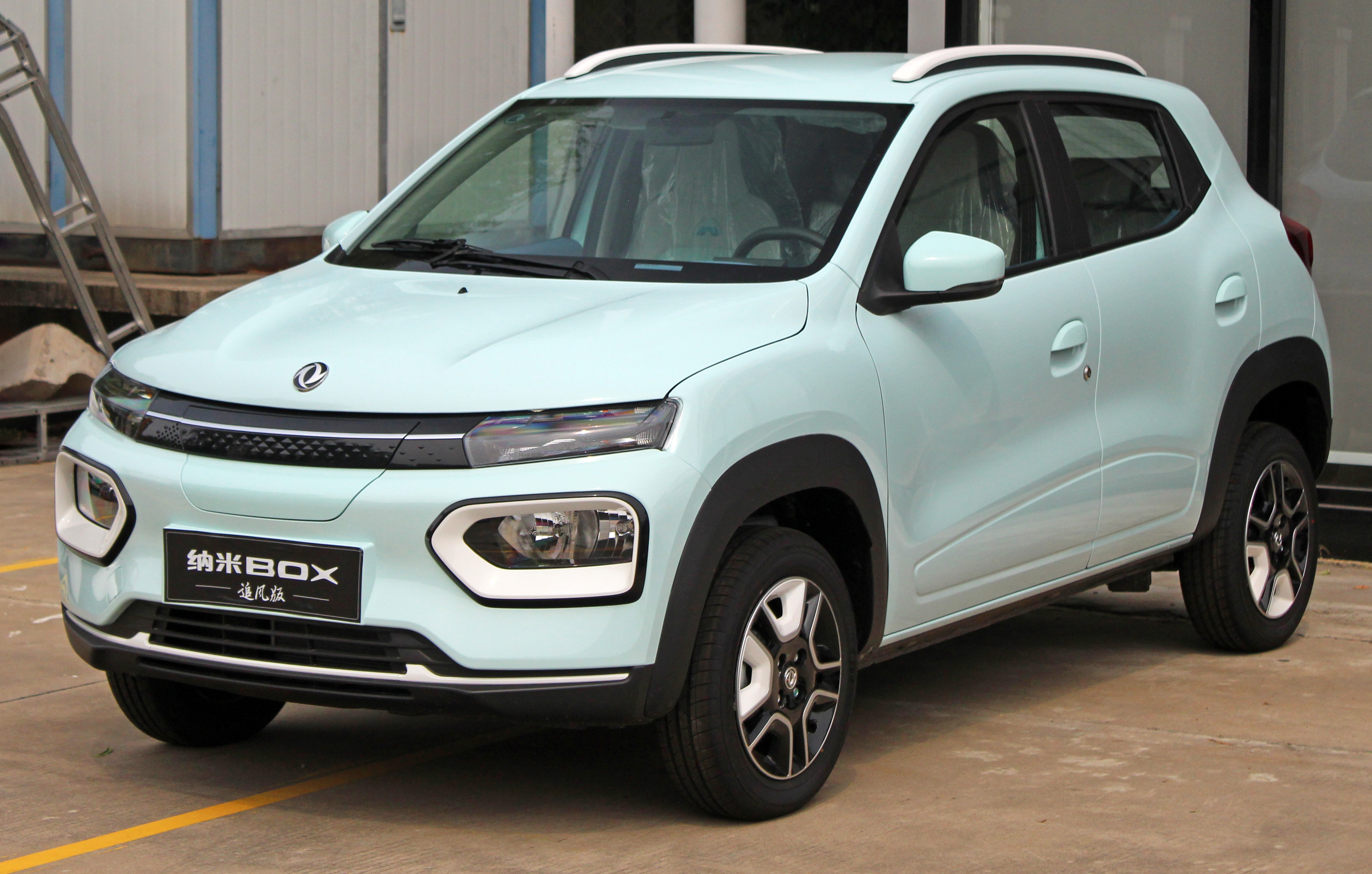
Dongfeng Nano Box

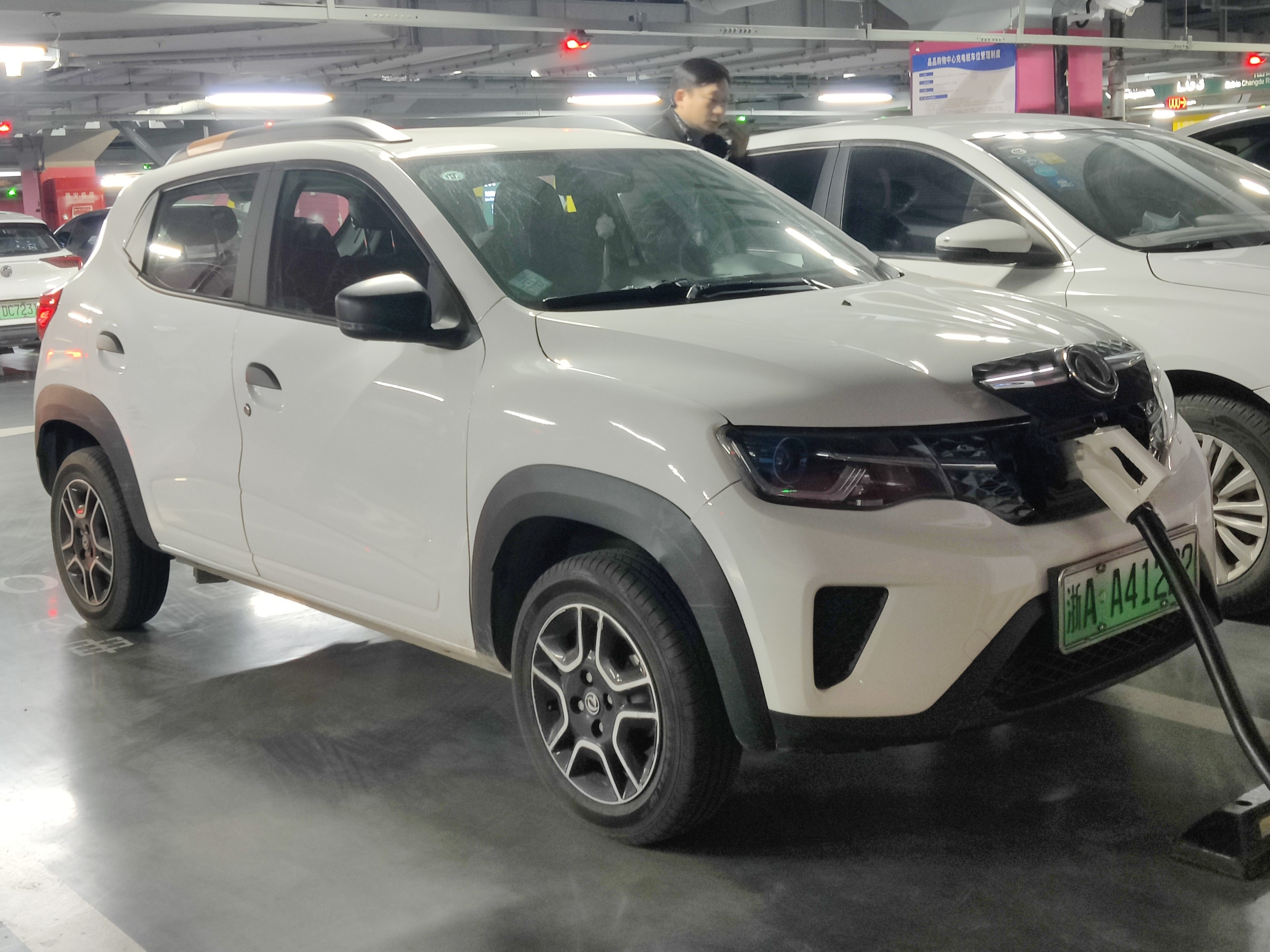
Dongfeng Nano EX1

== See also ==
- Automobile manufacturers and brands of China
- List of automobile manufacturers of China
