= Nammi 01 =

Battery electric subcompact hatchback

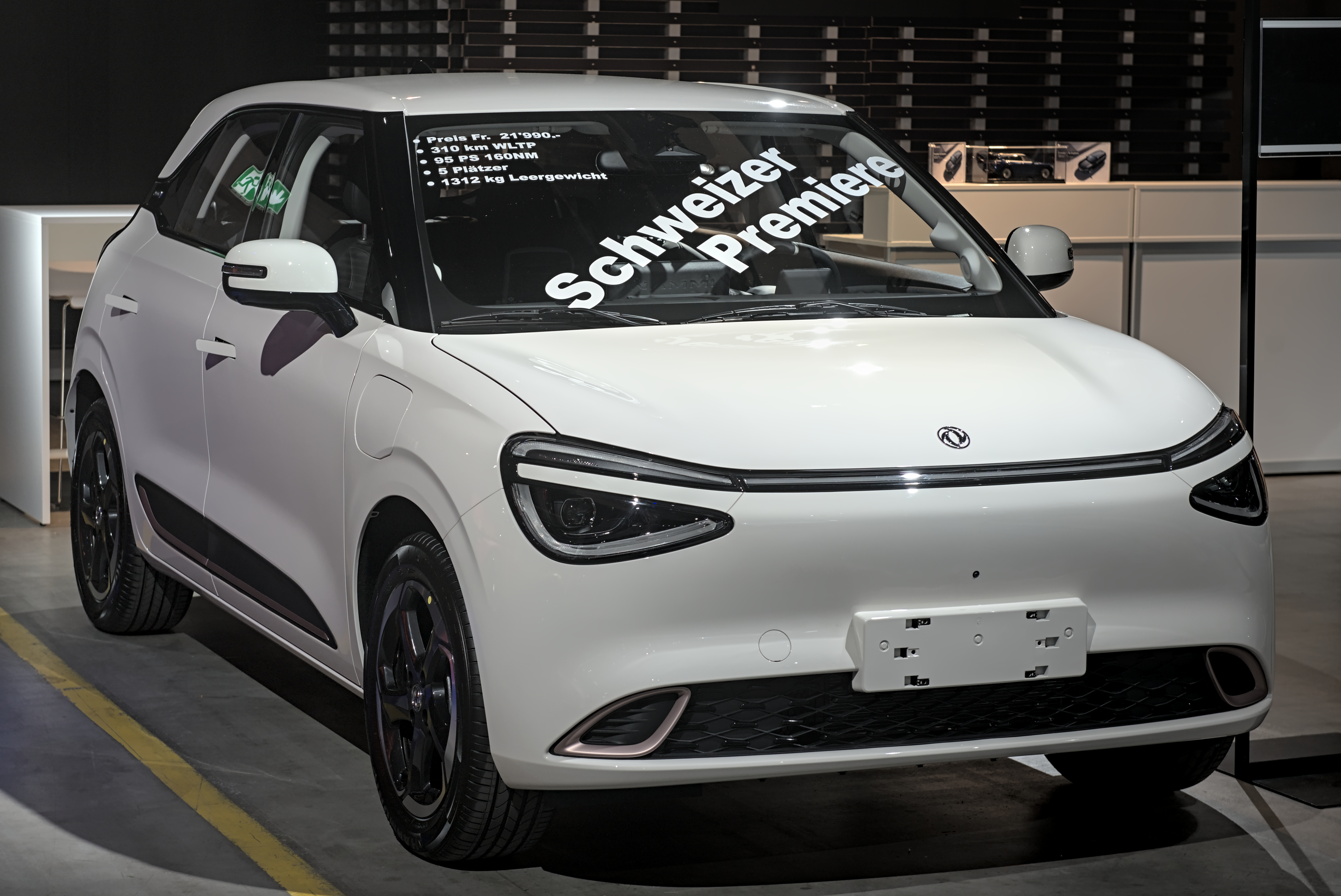

Overview
- Manufacturer: Dongfeng Nammi
- Also called: Dongfeng Box (export); Dongfeng Nammi Box (Norway, Finland, Switzerland, Nepal); Innoson/IVM EX02 (Nigeria); Itaoua Native (Burkina Faso); GuGo motors BOX (Pakistan); Opaia Okwa (Angola)
- Production: 2024–present
- Assembly: China: Xiangyang, Hubei

Body and chassis
- Class: Subcompact car (B)
- Body style: 5-door hatchback
- Layout: FF layout
- Platform: Dongfeng Quantum Architecture S3
- Related: Nammi 06

Powertrain
- Electric motor: Permanent-magnet synchronous motor
- Battery: 31.45 kWh lithium iron phosphate battery; 42.3 kWh lithium iron phosphate battery
- Range: 31.45 kWh: 230 km (140 mi) (WLTP); 330 km (210 mi) (CLTC); 42.3 kWh: 310 km (190 mi) (WLTP); 430 km (270 mi) (CLTC)

Dimensions
- Wheelbase: 2,660 mm (104.7 in)
- Length: 4,030 mm (158.7 in)
- Width: 1,810 mm (71.3 in)
- Height: 1,570 mm (61.8 in)
- Curb weight: 1,312 kg (2,892 lb)

The Nammi 01 (Chinese: 东风纳米01; pinyin: Dōngfēng nàmǐ 01) is a battery electric subcompact hatchback produced by Dongfeng Nammi since January 2024.

== Overview ==
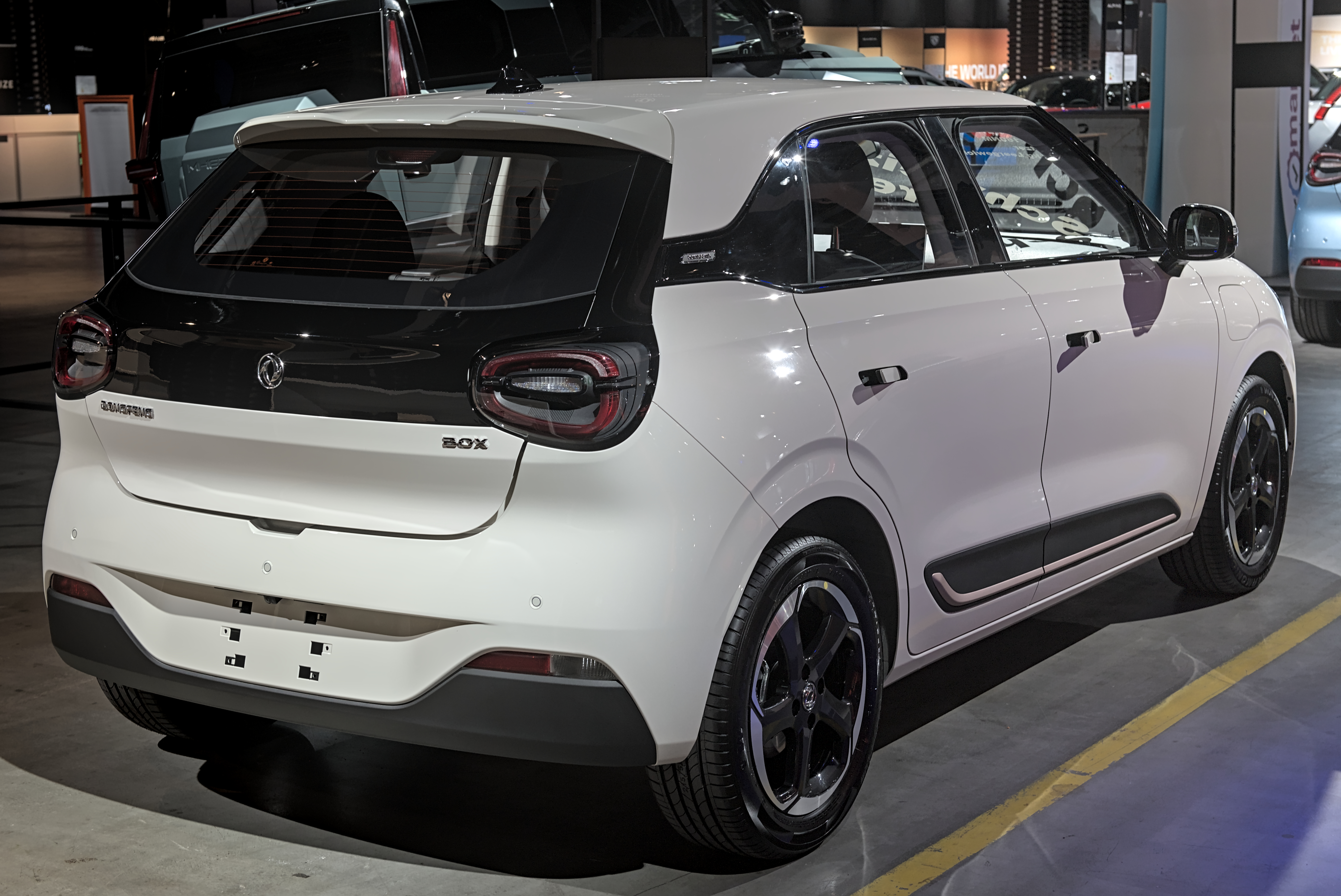
Rear view

Interior

Initially was unveiled at a dedicated event in August 2023, Dongfeng revealed the Nammi 01 at Auto Guangzhou on 17 November 2023, and simultaneously began pre-sale of the car to customers. It officially began rolling off the production line on 6 January 2024, as the first model under the newly created Nammi EV brand.

== Specifications ==
The Nammi 01 is available in two different lithium iron phosphate battery packs; one with a capacity of 31.45 kWh and range of 330 km (210 mi) and another with a capacity of 42.3 kWh and range of 430 km (270 mi), both of which are powered by a front-mounted permanent-magnet synchronous motor which has an output of 70 kW (94 hp) and 160 N⋅m (120 lb⋅ft) of torque.

== Markets ==
=== Europe ===
The Dongfeng Box is the official name of the model for the European market. In August 2024, presentations of the model were held in several European countries. In Norway, Finland and Switzerland, the car is marketed as the Dongfeng Nammi Box.

=== Hong Kong ===
The Dongfeng Box was launched in Hong Kong on 5 September 2024, in the Kowloon district of Hong Kong at the Olympian City Mall.

=== Malaysia ===
The Dongfeng Box was launched in Malaysia on 22 November 2024, by Pekema subsidiary of Central Auto Distributors. It is available with two variants: E2 (31.45 kWh) and E3 (42.3 kWh).

=== Nepal ===
The Dongfeng Nammi Box was launched in Nepal on 25 August 2024, as part of the model's right-hand drive (RHD) international debut. It is available with three variants: E1, E2 and E3, powered by either 31.4 kWh and 42.3 kWh battery packs.

=== Singapore ===
The Dongfeng Box was launched in Singapore on 25 September 2024, by Volt Auto. It is available in the sole variant powered by the 42.3 kWh battery pack.

=== South Africa ===
The Dongfeng Box was launched in South Africa on 25 November 2025, as part of Dongfeng entry to the South African market. It is available with four variants: E1 330, E2 330, E2 430 and E3 430, powered by either 31.4 kWh and 42.3 kWh battery packs.

=== Vietnam ===
The Dongfeng Box was launched in Vietnam on 10 January 2025, as part of Dongfeng's entry to the Vietnamese market. It is available with four variants: E1 (330 km), E2 (330 km), E2 (430 km) and E3 (430 km), powered by either 31.4 kWh and 42.3 kWh battery packs.

== Safety ==
Euro NCAP test results Dongfeng Box (LHD) (2025)
Test	Points	%
Overall:	3 /5 stars	
Adult occupant:	27.7	69%
Child occupant:	39.9	81%
Pedestrian:	42.8	67%
Safety assist:	13.9	77%

== Sales ==
Year	China
2024	33,437
2025	36,626
