= Dongfeng Vigo =

Battery electric compact crossover SUV

Overview
- Manufacturer: Dongfeng Nammi
- Also called: Nammi 06 (China); Evolute i-JOY (Russia, second generation)
- Production: 2025–present
- Assembly: China: Xiangyang, Hubei

Body and chassis
- Class: Compact crossover SUV (C)
- Body style: 5-door SUV
- Layout: FF layout
- Platform: Dongfeng Quantum Architecture S3
- Related: Nammi 01

Powertrain
- Electric motor: 135 kW permanent magnet synchronous
- Power output: 181 hp (135 kW; 184 PS)
- Battery: 44.94 kWh LFP Sunwoda; 51.87 kWh LFP Sunwoda
- Range: 300–350 km (190–220 mi) (WLTP); 401–471 km (249–293 mi) (CLTC)

Dimensions
- Wheelbase: 2,715 mm (106.9 in)
- Length: 4,306 mm (169.5 in)
- Width: 1,868 mm (73.5 in)
- Height: 1,645 mm (64.8 in)
- Curb weight: 1,975 kg (4,354 lb)

The Dongfeng Vigo is a battery electric compact crossover SUV produced by Dongfeng since 2025. It was first sold in China by Dongfeng's Nammi sub-brand under the name Nammi 06 (Chinese: 东风纳米06; pinyin: Dōngfēng nàmǐ 06).

== Overview ==
The first images of the Nammi 06 were revealed on 21 February 2025 before launch presentation on 8 April. It had its first public appearance at 2025 Auto Shanghai where pre-orders opened on April 28, with deliveries beginning on 27 May 2025. It is intended to compete with the BYD Yuan Up, and Dongfeng says that it will enter global markets.

The Nammi 06 shares its architecture with the smaller Nammi 01, which it also shares its exterior design language with. It has 17-inch wheels, a split-opening tailgate, and a 500 L (18 cu ft) rear cargo area.

The interior features an 8.8-inch digital gauge cluster integrated into the dashboard, with a standing 12.8-inch central infotainment touchscreen. It has a two-spoke steering wheel with a column shifter, and the center console features a 50W active-cooled wireless charging pad with a storage compartment below. It is equipped with a 6-speaker sound system, and higher trims have heated, ventilated, and massaging seats and a panoramic sunroof.

Rear view

Interior

== Specifications ==
All variants of the Nammi 06 come with a single 181 hp (135 kW; 184 PS) front motor, and is available with two Sunwoda-supplied LFP battery options: the standard 44.94 kWh pack with a CLTC range rating of 401 kilometres (249 mi), and the bigger 51.87 kWh pack with 471 kilometres (293 mi) of range. It is capable of DC fast charging from 30–80% in 18 minutes, and has a top speed of 150 km/h (93 mph).

== Markets ==
=== Malaysia ===
The Dongfeng Vigo was launched in Malaysia on 5 February 2026, in the sole variant powered by the 51.87 kWh battery pack.

=== Philippines ===
The Dongfeng Vigo was launched in the Philippines on 26 May 2026, in the sole variant powered by the 51.87 kWh battery pack.

=== Singapore ===
The Dongfeng Vigo was launched in Singapore on 20 January 2026, in the sole Essential trim powered by the 51.87 kWh battery pack.

=== South Africa ===
The Dongfeng Vigo was launched in South Africa on 10 April 2026, with two variants: E1 (44.94 kWh) and E3 (51.87 kWh). At the time of its introduction, the Vigo was the cheapest battery electric crossover SUV on sale in South Africa.

== Sales ==
Since its launch on 27 May 2025, the Nammi 06 received over 6,000 orders after 23 days.

Year	China
2025	8,720
