= List of Renault engines =

Engines used by French automaker Renault SA have historically been referenced in technical specifications along two distinct systems:

- A purely numeric system used from the origins of the company until the mid-1980s
- An alphanumeric system in use since then

== Numbering systems ==
=== Numeric ===
The numeric engine referencing system used until the mid-1980s was simply the chronological sequence of engine development projects. Thus, variants based on the same engine block may have unrelated numbers.

=== Alphanumeric ===
The system in use since the mid-1980s is of the format XnY-zzz where

- X is a letter specifying the engine family
- n is a one-digit code specifying the engine architecture as follows:
  1. Petrol engine with single-barrel carburetor and parallel valves (a layout often but not always associated with an overhead valve design)
  2. Petrol engine with double-barrel carburetor and parallel valves
  3. Petrol engine with single- or multi-point fuel injection and parallel valves
  4. Petrol engine with four valves per cylinder
  5. Petrol engine with direct petrol injection, prior to F engine: single-barrel carburetor and crossflow valve layout (deprecated)
  6. Petrol engine with double-barrel carburetor and crossflow valve layout
  7. Petrol engine with multi-point fuel injection with half-spherical combustion chambers and two valves per cylinder (includes also an early 16-valve version of the F-type engine)
  8. Diesel engine with indirect injection (prechamber)
  9. Diesel engine with direct injection
- Y is a one-letter indicator of displacement:
  A: under 750 cc
  B-U: from 750 to 2,250 cc in 50 cc, then 100 cc increments as displacement increases
  V-Z: above 2250 cc in increments larger than 100 cc
- zzz is a three-character alphanumeric code (usually starting with 7 or A) referring to key details of the variant's configuration (e.g., turbocharged, implemented in a specific vehicle, manual or automatic transmission, catalytic converter or not, etc. An odd number refers to an engine configured for automatic transmission, while an even number is meaning manual gearbox.)

== Engine families ==
=== A ===
The A engine was an all-aluminum overhead valve inline-four designed in the mid-1960s for the Renault 16 and produced in three variants:

- A1K: 1,470 cc
- AxL: 1,565-1,605 cc (also used in the R15 and R17 models).
- AxM: 1,647 cc

=== B ===
The B family (for the Billancourt factory where it was produced, also referred to as the Billancourt engine) was a cast-iron overhead valve three-bearing crankshaft inline-four designed in the mid-1940s for the 4CV and also used in the Renault 4 and Dauphine:

- 748 cc (out of production before alphanumeric codes were introduced)
- 782 cc (out of production before alphanumeric codes were introduced)
- B1B: 845 cc

=== B/BR (2016-) ===
The new B family three cylinder petrol engine appeared from 2016. NMKV developed the BR06 engine based on this engine for Nissan and Mitsubishi Kei car

- B4A/BR08: 799 cc Renault Kwid, Datsun redi-Go
- B4D: 999 cc (71x84); Renault Kwid, Renault Twingo, Renault Clio, Renault Triber, Dacia Sandero, Dacia Logan

=== C ===
The C family (for the Cléon-Fonte factory where it was produced, also referred to as Sierra in early variants), being also a cast-iron overhead valve inline-four but now with a five-bearing crankshaft, designed in the early 1960s for the Renault 8. An extremely sturdy, low-cost design, it was continuously refined over its 35-year career and was used in every supermini and compact Renault type up to and including the 1993 Twingo:

- C1C (689): 956 cc (65x72); 32 kW
- C1E (688): 1,108 cc (70x72); 28-34 kW
- C1G: 1,237 cc (71,5x77); 40 kW
- C3G: 1,239 cc (74x72); 40 kW; monopoint injection
- 810: 1,289 cc (73x77; out of production before alphanumeric codes were introduced); 32-47 kW
- C3J: 1,390 cc (75,8x77); 43 kW; monopoint injection.
- C1J/C2J (847): 1,397 cc (76x77); 43-52 kW normal aspiration / 77-88 kW turbo
- C6J (840): 1,397 cc (76x77 with hemispherical head); 68 kW normal aspiration, 79-116 kW turbo
- C7K: 1,430 cc (76x79)

=== CH ===
The CH-serie was a 90° V6 engine developed by Gordini for Renault's autosport activities, the engine was used by Equipe Renault Elf in Formula One from 1973 to 1978. This François Castaing design was the predecessor of the famous EF series.

- CH1 (N/A): 1,997 cc Bore 86.0 mm (3.4 in) Stroke 57.3 mm (2.25 in)

285 bhp @ 9,800rpm (1973), 300 bhp @ 10,500rpm (1977)

- CHS (Turbo): 1,997 cc Bore 86.0 mm (3.4 in) Stroke 57.3 mm (2.25 in)

500 bhp @ 9,500rpm (1975–1978)

- CHS 2 (Turbo): 2,138 cc Bore 89.0 mm (3.5 in) Stroke 57.3 mm (2.25 in)

520/540 bhp @ 9,500rpm (1978)

=== D ===
The D family is the successor to the smaller versions of Type C, introduced in the mid-1990s, and is a cast-iron overhead camshaft inline-4 that powers the Renault Twingo:

- D4F: 1149 cc 16v 75 bhp - 2001 (petrol engine used on Dacia Sandero II, Dacia Logan II, Renault Clio and the Proton Savvy)
- D4Ft: 1149 cc 16v 100 bhp - 2007 (A turbocharged version of the D4F, with uprated internals to support the extra power produced)
- D7F: 1149 cc 8v 54 bhp - 1996 (uprated to 57 bhp in 2001)

A 1000 cc D7D version was abandoned after early development.

=== E ===
The E family (for Energy) is the successor to the larger versions of Type C. It is a cast-iron overhead camshaft inline-4 introduced on the Renault 19 in 1988 and widely used in the Clio and Mégane lineups:

- E5F/E7F: 1171 cc
- E5J/E6J/E7J: 1390 cc (E7J 260 with gearbox JH3 050 - is used in Dacia SuperNova. Solenza has E7J 262)
- E7M/E4M: 1598 cc

=== EF ===
The EF-serie was a 90° V6 Turbocharged engine jointly developed by Renault and Gordini, the engine was used by Equipe Renault Elf in Formula One from 1977 to 1985. This engine derived from the CH series designed by François Castaing, the F1 engine was developed by Bernard Dudot.

- EF1 Turbo: 1,492 cc Bore 86.0 mm (3.4 in) Stroke 42.8 mm (1.7 in) 7.0:1 Compression

525 bhp (1977), 530 bhp (1979), 585 bhp (1982), 650 bhp (1983)

- EF1 Bi-Turbo: 1,492 cc Bore 86.0 mm (3.4 in) Stroke 42.8 mm (1.7 in) 7.0:1 Compression

530 bhp (1979), 585 bhp (1982), 650 bhp (1983)

- EF4(B) Bi-Turbo: 1,492 cc Bore 86.0 mm (3.4 in) Stroke 42.8 mm (1.7 in) 7.0:1 Compression

760 bhp (1984–1986)

- EF15(B, C) Bi-Turbo: 1,494 cc Bore 80.1 mm (3.2 in) Stroke 49.4 mm (1.9 in) 7.5:1 Compression

815 bhp (1985–1986), 900 bhp (1986)

=== F ===
The F inline-4 family (for Fonte, French for cast iron) was the successor to the A family. Launched in 1981 on the Renault 9 and Renault 11, it has been the mainstay of Renault's engine lineup through the early 2000s in a succession of increasingly powerful petrol and Diesel variants in overhead camshaft configurations. It was also Renault's first production four-valve design. It is being replaced by the M engine resp. R engine (diesel only).

- F1N/F2N/F3N: 1721 cc
- F7P: 1764 cc (injection R19 16V 138HP)
- F3P: 1794 cc
- F4P: 1783 cc (evolution of the F3P, 16V with variable valve control on the inlet camshaft)
- F3R/F4R/F7R: 1998 cc
- F5R: 1998cc (direct fuel injection - IDE - only 2 years in production, used in the Megane Coupé and the Laguna II)
- F8Q/F9Q: 1870 cc (indirect injection/direct injection/common rail)

=== G ===
The G engine was designed in the late 1980s to be a modular family of overhead camshaft inline 4- and 5-cylinder petrol and diesel engines. A G7R petrol and a G8T Diesel variant were in development when Renault announced a merger with Volvo who was designing its own modular family along the same lines. The group decided to cancel the petrol versions, but diesel production started in 1993 and they were built for nearly two decades, until 2011. Despite the breakdown of the merger in 1993, Renault did use Volvo petrol engines (Type N) in its mid- and full-size models until the early 2000s.

- G8T/G9T: 2188 cc
- G9U: 2464 cc

=== H ===
H engines summarize two families of gasoline engines, the smaller with a max. cylinder bore of 72.2 mm and a larger family with typically 78 mm bore:

1. The smaller family covers 0.9 - 1.33 litres of swept volume and was co-developed by Renault, Mercedes-Benz and Nissan. The largest naturally aspirated version has three cylinders and 1.0L, four cylinder engines are not known without turbocharging. This family was introduced to Renault, Mercedes and Nissan cars sold in Europe.
1. The bigger family covers 1.0 - 1.6 litres of swept volume and are co-developed by Renault and Nissan. Engines are mostly naturally aspirated while some versions with turbo or super charging are available. Most engines had been introduced by Nissan.

Multiple usage of the Renault H series resp. Nissan HR name plates may cause some confusion because both families offer a three-cylinder 1.0L version and another 1.2L version with 3 resp. 4 cylinders. It appears to be that the earlier engine was named HR10 (bore 78mm x 69.7 mm stroke) while the later got HRA0 (72.2 x 83.1) resp. the earlier was named HR12 (78 x 83.6) and the later got HRA2 (72.2 x 73.1). Renault may not suffer from this because they never utilized the bigger three cylinder engines. Nonetheless both families have DOHC and an aluminium alloy crankcase and cylinder head. For this engine family some of the naming system has been taken over from Nissan: 't' means 'turbo-charged' and 'k' stands for 'kaizen' which means 'change for better' or 'continuous improvement' in Japanese.

- late 2008- : H4Jt, 1397 cc, turbo-charged petrol engine used on Renault Mégane
- 04/2009- : H4M, 1598 cc, petrol engine used on Renault Samsung SM3
- 03/2010- : H4K, 1498cc, petrol engine used on Renault Duster, Renault Captur
- 09/2012- : H4Mk, 1598 cc, updated H4M petrol engine used on Renault Samsung SM3
- 02/2012- : H5Ft, 1197/1198 cc, turbo-charged petrol engine used on Renault Clio IV, Renault Captur, Renault Kangoo II, Renault Mégane III, Renault Mégane IV, Renault Scénic III, Renault Scénic IV, Renault Kadjar, Dacia Lodgy, Dacia Dokker, Dacia Duster. Marketed as the 1.2 TCe, this engine has been plagued by abnormal oil consumption.
- 05/2012- : H4Bt, 898 cc, turbo-charged petrol engine used on Dacia Sandero II, Dacia Logan II, Nissan Micra, Renault Clio IV, Renault Captur, Renault Twingo III, Smart Fortwo
- 11/2014- : H4D, 999 cc, n/a petrol engine used on Renault Twingo
- 05/2018- : H5Ht, 1332 cc, used on Mercedes A class(W177) and other compact cars, Renault Scenic IV, Renault Captur, Renault Megane IV, Renault Clio V, Nissan Qashqai, Renault Kadjar, Dacia Duster, Dacia Lodgy, Renault Samsung XM3, Renault Oroch
- 04/2020- : H4Dt/H5D, 999 cc, turbo-charged petrol engine used on Renault Clio, Nissan Almera, Dacia/Renault Duster

=== J ===
The J family (also referred to as the Douvrin engine) was an all-aluminum overhead camshaft inline-four design jointly developed with PSA. Introduced in 1977, it was phased out in 1996 and replaced by the F series.

- J5R/J6R/J7R: 1995 cc
- J6T/J7T: 2165 cc
- J8S: 2068 cc (diesel)

=== K ===
The K type is a major evolution of the E type.

- K4J/K7J: 1,390 cc (16v/8v)
- K4M/K7M: 1,598 cc (16v/8v)
- K9K: 1,461 cc (dCi)

=== L ===
The L type is an overhead camshaft petrol V6 developed jointly with PSA, who refer to it as the ES engine:

Renault used this engine first in the Laguna in 1997, shortly after it became available in the Safrane, and the Espace rated 194 PS (143 kW). Engines after 2001 got a new injection system and variable valve timing, this variant is rated 211 PS (155 kW), was being used in the Avantime, and the Laguna II V6. The engine was also used in the Clio V6, rated 230 PS (169 kW) in the phase 1 vehicles, and 255 PS (188 kW) after the facelift.

- L7X: 2,946 cc

=== M ===
The M engine is an overhead camshaft engine developed jointly with Nissan, who refer to it as the MR engine. Two Diesel versions are in use at Renault as of the mid-2000s, although the petrol versions already launched by Nissan will almost certainly be used as well.

- M9R: 1,995 cc, bore 84mm, stroke 90mm (diesel engine used in Nissan Qashqai, Renault Mégane, Scénic, Laguna, Vel Satis, Koleos and Espace; launched early 2005)
- M9T: 2,298 cc, bore 85mm, stroke 101,3mm (diesel engine used in Master and other vans, launched 2010, Nissan Navara D23 (YS23DDT/T) from 2014)
- M4R: 1,997cc (petrol engine used on Renault Clio III, Laguna III, Megane III, Latitude and Fluence; launched November 2006)
- M5M: 1,618cc (petrol engine used on Renault Clio RS, Renault Talisman, Renault Megane IV, Renault Kadjar)
- M5R: 1,997cc (petrol engine used on Renault Koleos II)
- M5Pt: 1,797cc (petrol engine used on Alpine A110 (2017), Renault Espace V, and Megane IV RS280)

=== N ===
Renault's N designation refers to the sourced all-aluminum Volvo modular 4-valve DOHC inline-4 -5 engines fitted in the Laguna and Safrane.

- N7Q: 2.0l (1,948 cm^{3}) Bore 83.0 mm (3.27") Stroke 90.0 mm (3.55") 10.5:1Cr 100/102 kW (136/139 bhp) 06/'95 → 03/'01
- N7U: 2.5l (2,435 cm^{3}) Bore 83.0 mm (3.27") Stroke 90.0 mm (3.55") 10.5:1Cr 121 kW (165 bhp) 07/'96 → 12/'00 (only Safrane)

=== P ===
The P engine is an overhead camshaft Diesel V6 sourced from Isuzu and used in the Vel Satis sedan and Espace minivan:

- P9X: 2958 cc

=== R ===
The R-Type is a family of straight-4 turbocharged diesel engines based on its predecessor F9M. Replaced the K engine. Production started in 2011.

- R9M: 1598 cc, 130 PS to 160 PS
- R9N: 1749 cc, 120 PS to 150 PS

=== RS ===
The RS Prefix is Renault's internal designation for their Formula 1 racing engines.

- RS01: N/A V10 (65°) 3493 cc 650 bhp
- RS02: N/A V10 (65°) 3500 cc 660 bhp
- RS3(B, C): N/A V10 (67°) 3493 cc 700 bhp
- RS4: N/A V10 (67°) 3493 cc 750 bhp
- RS5: N/A V10 (67°) 3493 cc 760-780 bhp
- RS6(B): N/A V10 (67°) 3500 cc 790-830 bhp
- RS7(B, C): N/A V10 (67°) 3000 cc 675-700 bhp
- RS8(B): N/A V10 (67°) 2998 cc 700 bhp
- RS9(B): N/A V10 (71°) 3000 cc 730-760 bhp, 775 bhp
- RS21: N/A V10 (111°) 2997 cc 780 bhp
- RS22: N/A V10 (112°) 2998 cc 800+ bhp
- RS23(B): N/A V10 (112°) 2998 cc 800 bhp
- RS24(B): N/A V10 (72°) 2998 cc 820 bhp
- RS25(B, C, D, E): N/A V10 (72°) 2998 cc 800 bhp, 820 bhp, 850 bhp, 900 bhp
- RS26(B, C, D, E): N/A V8 (90°) 2398 cc 740 bhp, 750 bhp, 760 bhp, 770 bhp
- RS27: N/A V8 (90°) 2400 cc >750 bhp

=== S ===
The S engine was a cast-iron overhead camshaft inline-4 Diesel engine sourced from Italian engine manufacturer SOFIM. It has been used in the Trafic and Master utility van and the Safrane sedan since 1981:

- S8U/S9U: 2445 cc
- S9W: 2799 cc

=== V ===
The V engine is Renault's internal designation for the Nissan VQ engine, an overhead camshaft V6 used in the Vel Satis sedan, Latitude and Espace minivan. The V designation is also used for an unrelated diesel V6 engine jointly developed by Renault and Nissan, used in the Renault Laguna coupé, Latitude and designated V9X.

- V4U: 2495 cc
- V4Y: 3498 cc
- V9X: 2993 cc

=== X ===
The X engine (referred to as XZ and XY by PSA) was an all-aluminum overhead camshaft inline-4 jointly developed with PSA. Introduced in 1974, it powered the ill-fated Renault 14 midsize car and was phased out in 1982 by evolutions of the C series:

- X1G: 1219 cc
- X2J: 1360 cc

=== Z ===
The Z engine, also known as the PRV engine, was an aluminium overhead camshaft V6 developed jointly with PSA and Volvo in the early 1970s. Introduced in 1975 on the Renault 30, it also powered the 25, Safrane, Laguna, Espace, and Alpine. It also famously powered the DeLorean sports car.

- Z7U: 2,458 cc
- Z7V: 2,664 cc
- Z6W/Z7W: 2,849 cc
- Z7X: 2,975, then 2,963 cc
