= Datsun redi-Go =

Datsun redi-Go (CD0)
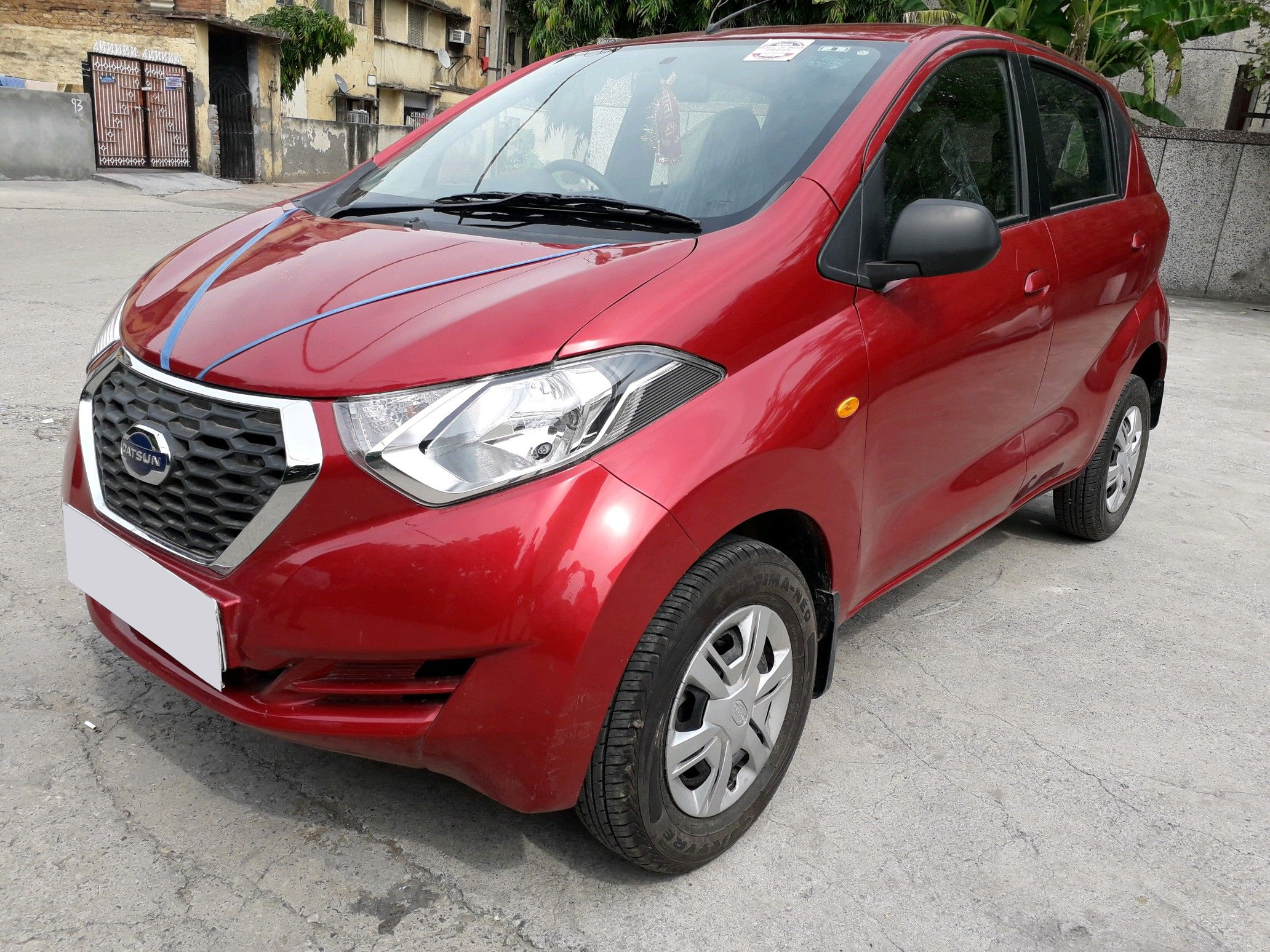

Overview
- Manufacturer: Datsun (Nissan)
- Production: 2016–2022
- Assembly: India: Chennai (Renault Nissan India)
- Designer: Kazuki Yamazaki (pre-facelift)

Body and chassis
- Class: City car
- Body style: 5-door hatchback
- Layout: Front-engine, front-wheel-drive
- Platform: Renault–Nissan CMF-A platform
- Related: Renault Kwid

Powertrain
- Engine: Petrol: 799 cc BR08DE I3; 999 cc BR10DE I3
- Power output: 40 kW (54 hp; 54 PS) (BR08); 50 kW (67 hp; 68 PS) (BR10)
- Transmission: 5-speed manual 5-speed automated manual transmission

Dimensions
- Wheelbase: 2,348 mm (92.4 in)
- Length: 3,430–3,435 mm (135.0–135.2 in)
- Width: 1,560–1,574 mm (61.4–62.0 in)
- Height: 1,541–1,546 mm (60.7–60.9 in)
- Kerb weight: 650 kg (1,430 lb)

The Datsun redi-Go is a city car produced by Datsun, a brand from Nissan, initially intended for the Indian market. A concept vehicle was unveiled at 2014 Auto Expo and the production model was unveiled on 14 April 2016. The redi-Go is targeted at a younger market.

== Characteristics ==
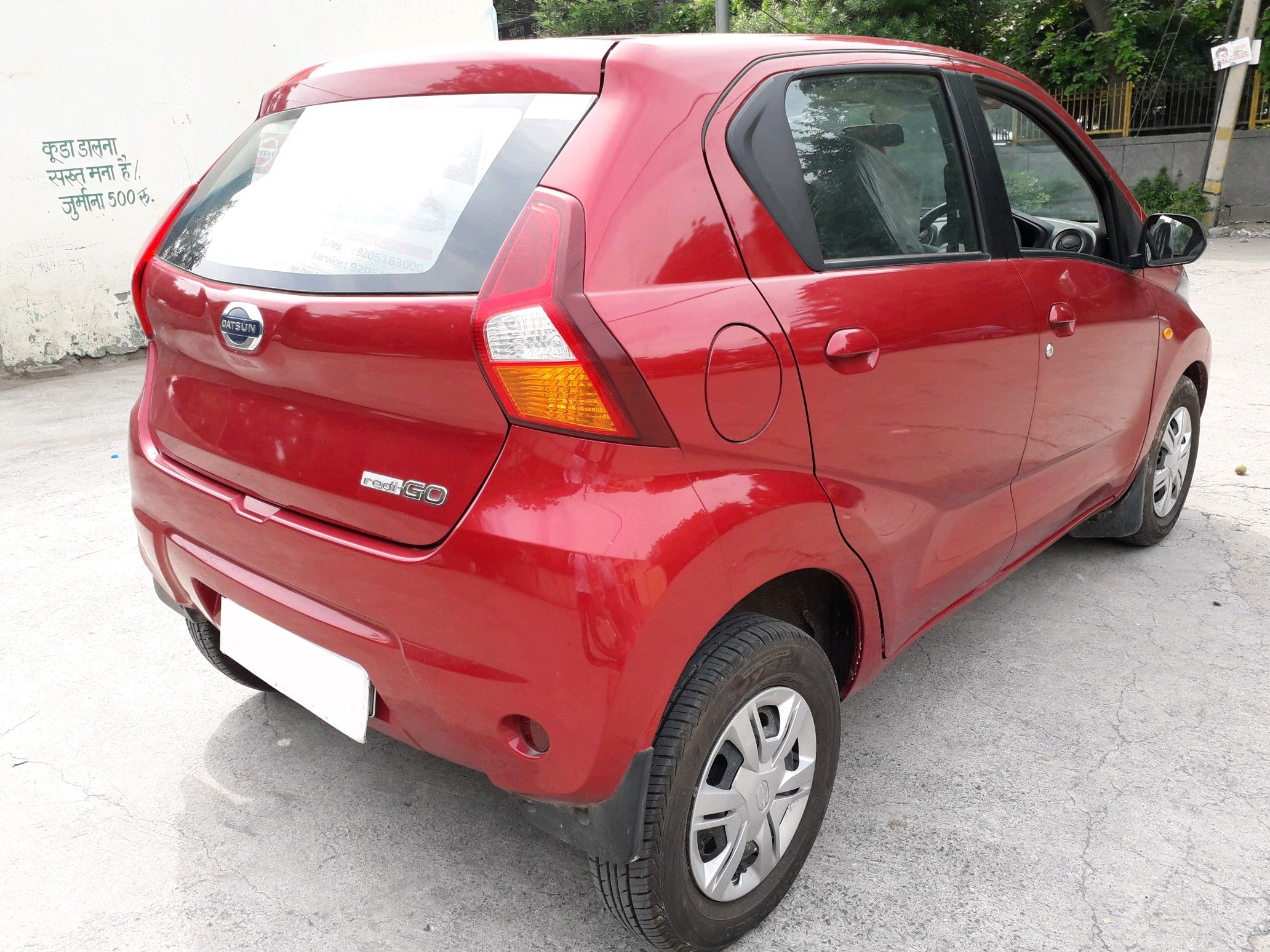
Rear view (pre-facelift)

The redi-Go uses the CMF-A platform as the Renault Kwid, which was launched earlier, with the same 0.8-litre BR08 three-cylinder petrol engine with a 40 kW (54 hp; 54 PS) power output and 72 N⋅m (53 lb⋅ft) of torque, coupled to a 5-speed manual transmission. In addition to the original 0.8-litre engine, a 1.0-litre BR10 engine option was also added in 2017. It produces 50 kW (67 hp; 68 PS) and 91 N⋅m (67 lb⋅ft) of torque.

The redi-Go is comparably lighter, shorter, and has a larger ground clearance (185 mm (7.3 in)) than the Kwid.

== Safety ==
The redi-Go for India with driver airbag received 1 star for adult occupants and 2 stars for toddlers from Global NCAP 1.0 in 2019 (similar to Latin NCAP 2013).

Global NCAP 1.0 test results (India) Datsun Redigo – Driver Airbag (2019, similar to Latin NCAP 2013)
Test	Score	Stars
Adult occupant protection	8.36/17.00	1 /5 stars
Child occupant protection	15.63/49.00	2 /5 stars
