= Renault Kwid =

Crossover city car

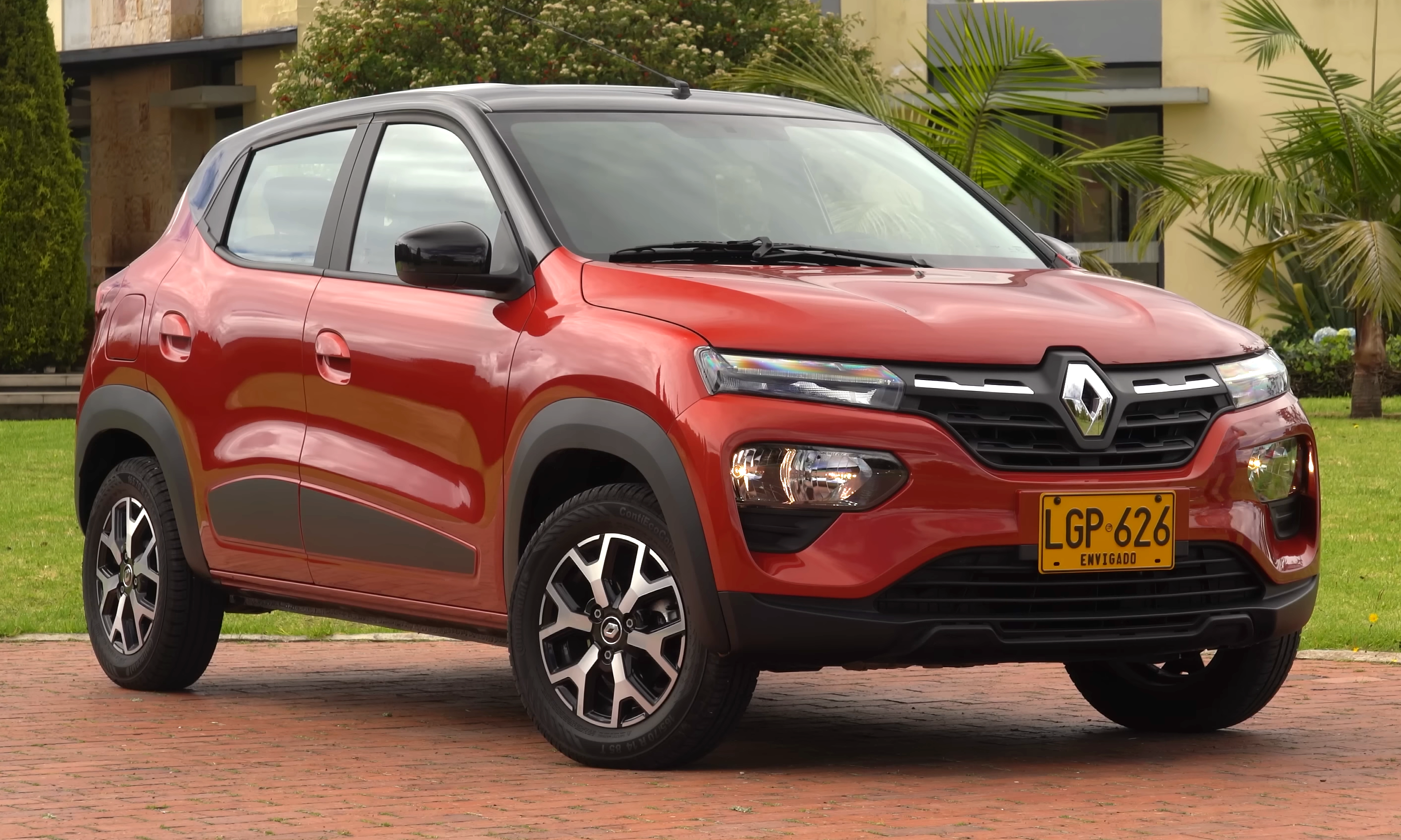
- 2023 Renault Kwid (Colombia; first facelift)

Overview
- Manufacturer: Renault
- Model code: BW
- Also called: IKCO K112 (Iran, code name); Renault Climber (Brunei); Dacia Spring; Renault City
- Production: 2015–present
- Assembly: India: Chennai (Renault Nissan India); Brazil: São José dos Pinhais (Renault Brazil); Colombia: Envigado (Sofasa, 2025–present)
- Designer: Serge Cosenza

Body and chassis
- Class: Crossover city car (A)
- Body style: 5-door hatchback
- Layout: Front-engine, front-wheel-drive
- Platform: Renault–Nissan CMF-A platform
- Related: Datsun redi-Go; Nissan Magnite; Renault Kiger; Renault Triber

Powertrain
- Engine: Petrol: 799 cc BR08DE I3; 999 cc BR10DE I3
- Power output: 40 kW (54 hp) (0.8); 50 kW (67 hp) (1.0)
- Transmission: 5-speed manual; 5-speed Easy-R automated manual

Dimensions
- Wheelbase: 2,422 mm (95.4 in)
- Length: 3,679–3,740 mm (144.8–147.2 in)
- Width: 1,579 mm (62.2 in)
- Height: 1,478 mm (58.2 in)
- Curb weight: 775 kg (1,709 lb)

Chronology
- Predecessor: Renault Sandero (Mexico)

The Renault Kwid is a crossover city car produced by the French car manufacturer Renault, initially intended for the Indian market and launched in 2015. In 2017, an improved Brazilian version was introduced for Latin American markets. Its battery electric version, named Renault City K-ZE, was launched in 2019, being manufactured in China and exported to Europe since 2021 as the Dacia Spring Electric and to Latin America since 2022 as Renault Kwid E-Tech.

== History ==
The Kwid was developed under the project code BBA. It is the first car to be based on the new CMF-A platform jointly developed by Renault and Nissan. It is slightly longer but narrower than Renault's smallest conventional vehicle, the Twingo with a high sitting position and a 180 mm (7.1 in) ride height.

The car was designed by an engineers' team settled in India led by Gérard Detourbet, a senior engineer, former mathematician described as "an innovation a minute" who led the development team for the first-generation Dacia Logan.

The Kwid was unveiled at Chennai on 20 May 2015 by Renault's CEO Carlos Ghosn. Ghosn said the car would be "a game changer for Renault in India." The car has 98 per cent of parts localisation and extensive engineering by local Renault personnel. The Kwid is aimed at competing with other small cars within the Indian market, such as the Suzuki Alto, and incorporates uncommon equipment for its segment such as a digital instrument cluster and a multimedia touchscreen.

In September 2015, the Kwid was launched in India at a starting price of 257,000 rupees, equal to $3,884. Sales started in September and had a "flying start" of 25,000 bookings in 2 weeks and 50,000 in 5 weeks, then 70,000 in 2 months, getting 10% of effective market shares in its segment. The Indian version is exported to various overseas markets such as Sri Lanka, Indonesia, Tunisia and Sub-Saharan Africa.

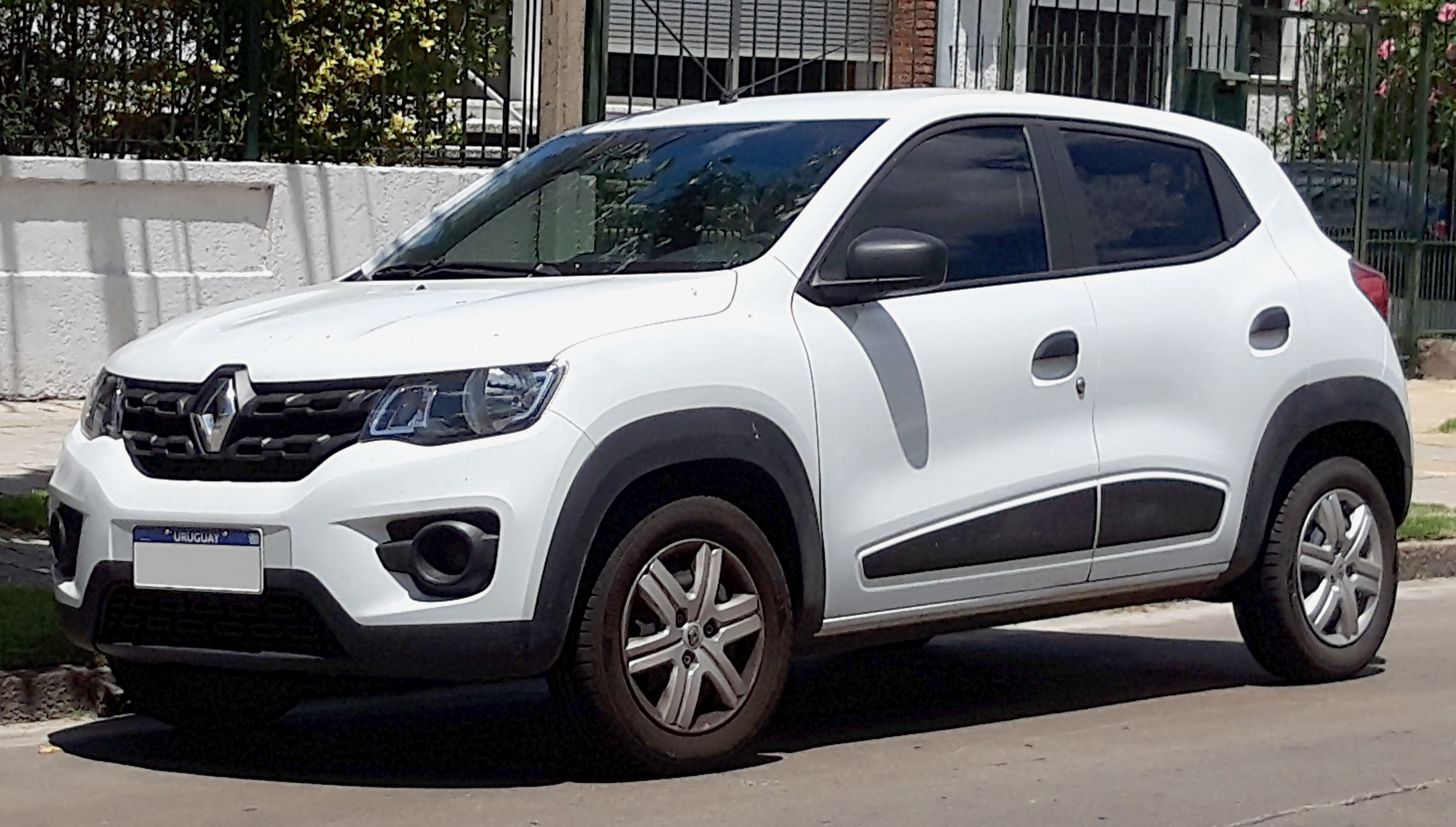
Front view (pre-facelift)

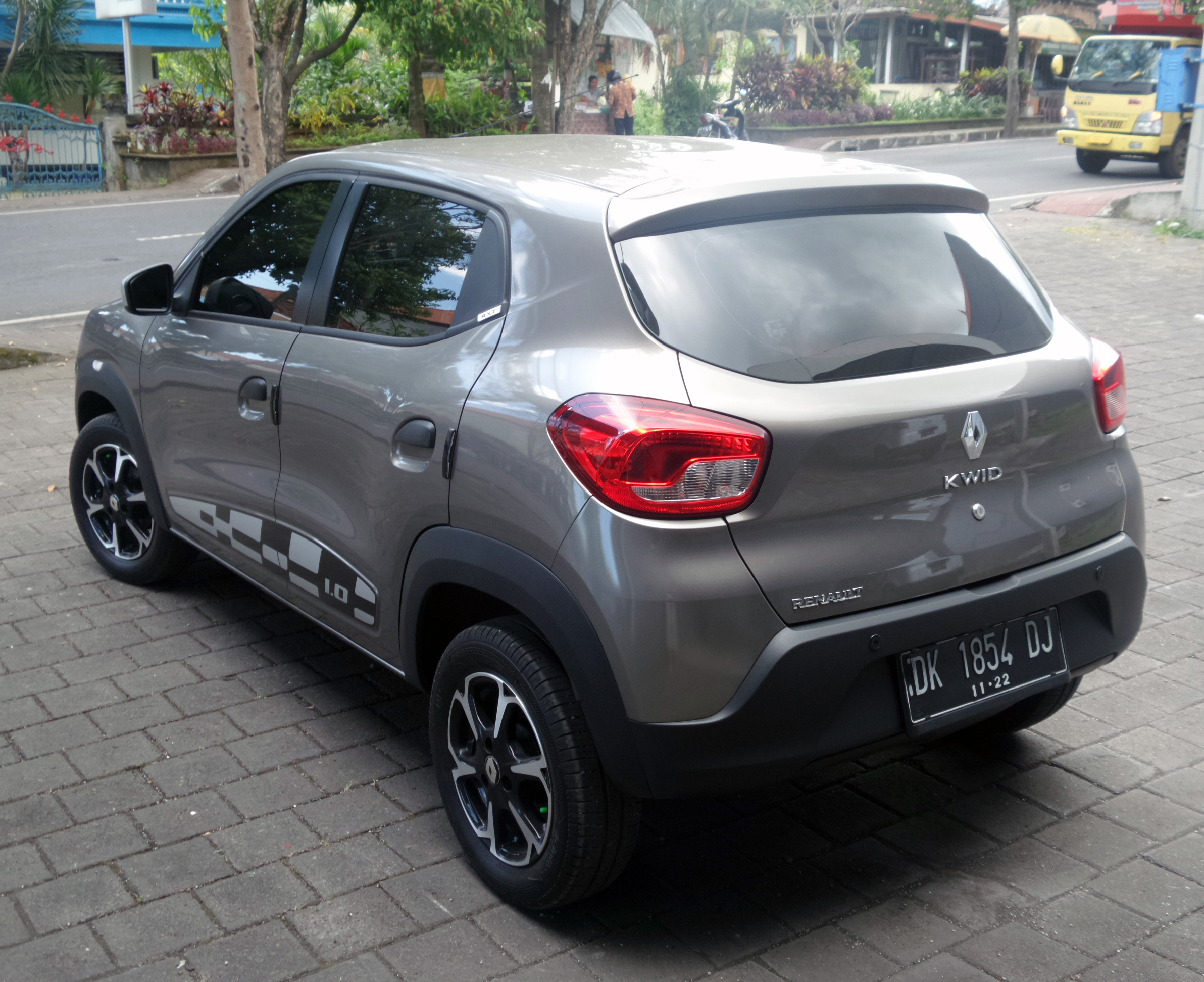
Rear view (pre-facelift)

== Overview ==
At launch, the only engine available was a three-cylinder, 799 cc unit with a 40 kW (54 hp) power output and 72 N⋅m (53 lb⋅ft) torque, coupled to a 5-speed manual transmission. According to the Indian newspaper The Financial Express, Kwid's 300-litre boot space is "the most voluminous in its class" and its fuel efficiency is "class-leading", at 59.2 mpg_{‑US}; 3.973 l/100 km (25.17 km/L). In August 2016, the Kwid received a more powerful 1.0-liter engine. The Kwid 1.0 is powered by a 999 cc engine which churns out 50 kW (67 hp) of power and 91 N⋅m (67 lb⋅ft) of peak torque.

The Renault Kwid received a minor update in July 2018. It gets new features such as pretensioner front seat-belts, two additional USB sockets, a rear armrest, a new grille and two new colour schemes. The Dacia Easy-R 5-speed automated manual transmission became available on Indian market Kwid models.

=== Latin American version ===
In 2017, a heavily revised version of the Kwid started production at the Renault plant in Brazil. To comply with stricter Brazilian regulations, the localised version has various structural reinforcements and four airbags as standard which made its weight go up 88 kg compared to the Indian version. This version only offers a 1.0-litre inline-three petrol engine.

It was later introduced to the Mexican market in May 2019, replacing the Sandero, although the Stepway version continued to be sold. It is offered with Intens, Iconic, and Outsider trim levels. A Bitono trim level was added later on 10 November 2020, with the main difference having a black roof and can be ordered in the Marfil (Ivory), Rojo Fuego (Fire Red), and Naranja Ocre (Ocher Orange) colours. It is identical to the Outsider trim level and is positioned above said trim.

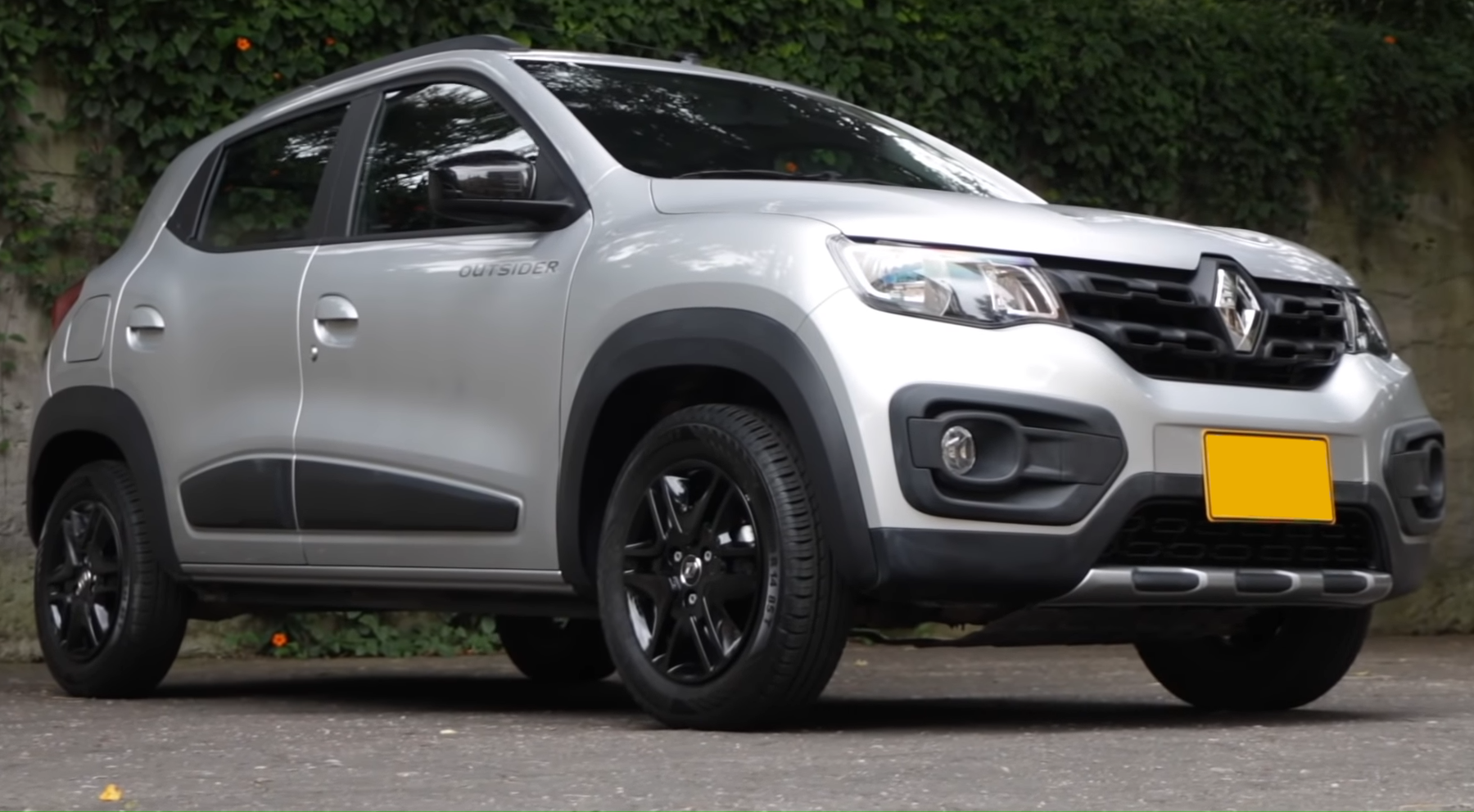
Renault Kwid Outsider (pre-facelift)

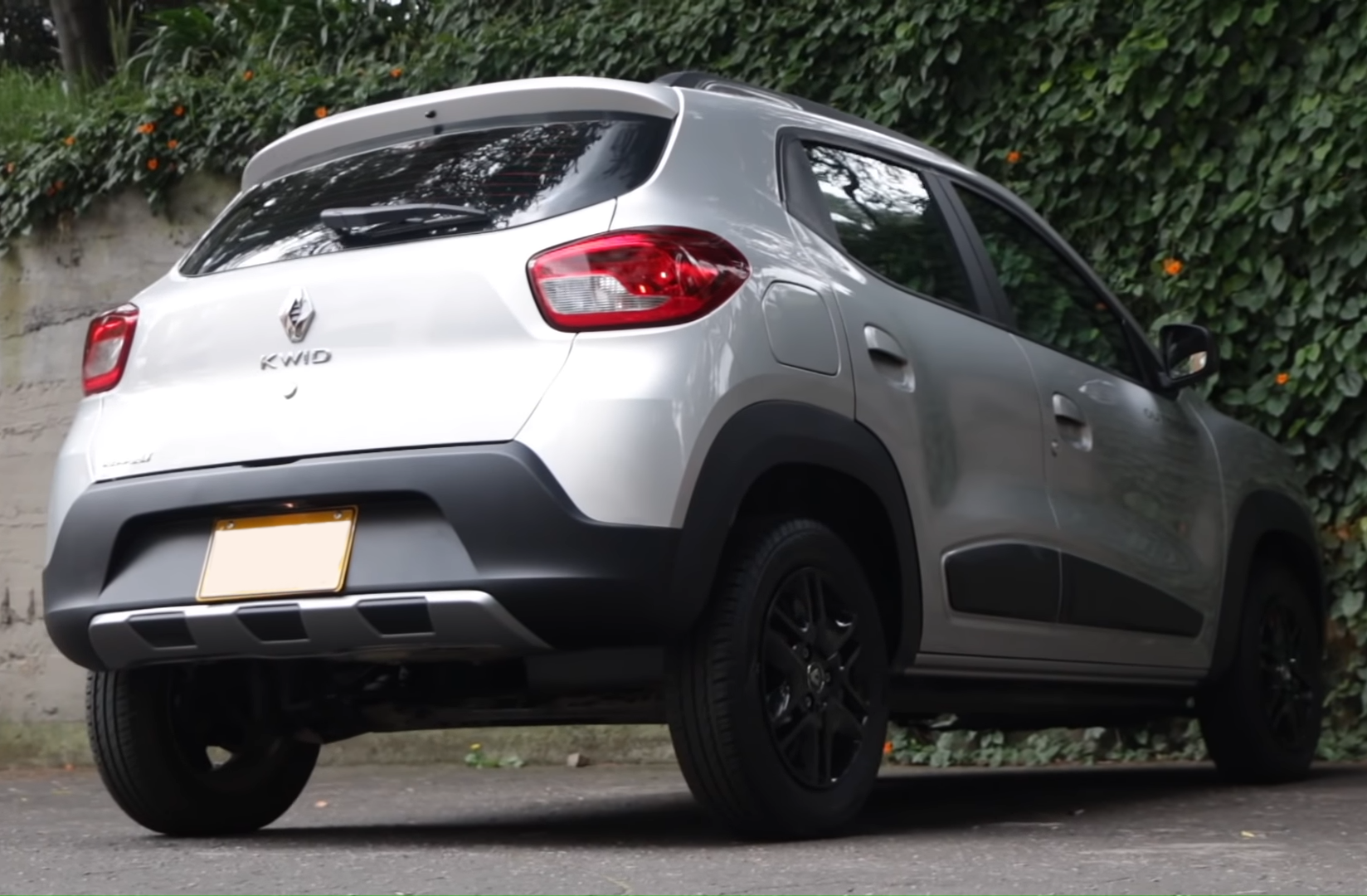
Renault Kwid Outsider (pre-facelift)

=== Facelift (2019) ===
The Kwid in its facelift form debuted in India in October 2019, with a front fascia inspired by their electric version Renault City K-ZE, unveiled earlier in 2018, with the featured split headlamps consisting of LED daytime running lights, turning lights and positioning lights in the top portion and the main beam in the bottom portion. The Kwid facelift also featured a larger 8.0-inch infotainment system equipped with Apple CarPlay and Android Auto and an optional passenger side front airbag.

This facelift was launched for the Brazilian and Latin American markets in early 2022.

The Kwid in facelift model was went on sale in Brunei in late July 2022, marking the return of the Renault brand in the Brunei market after 9 years. It is offered in RXT and Climber variants.

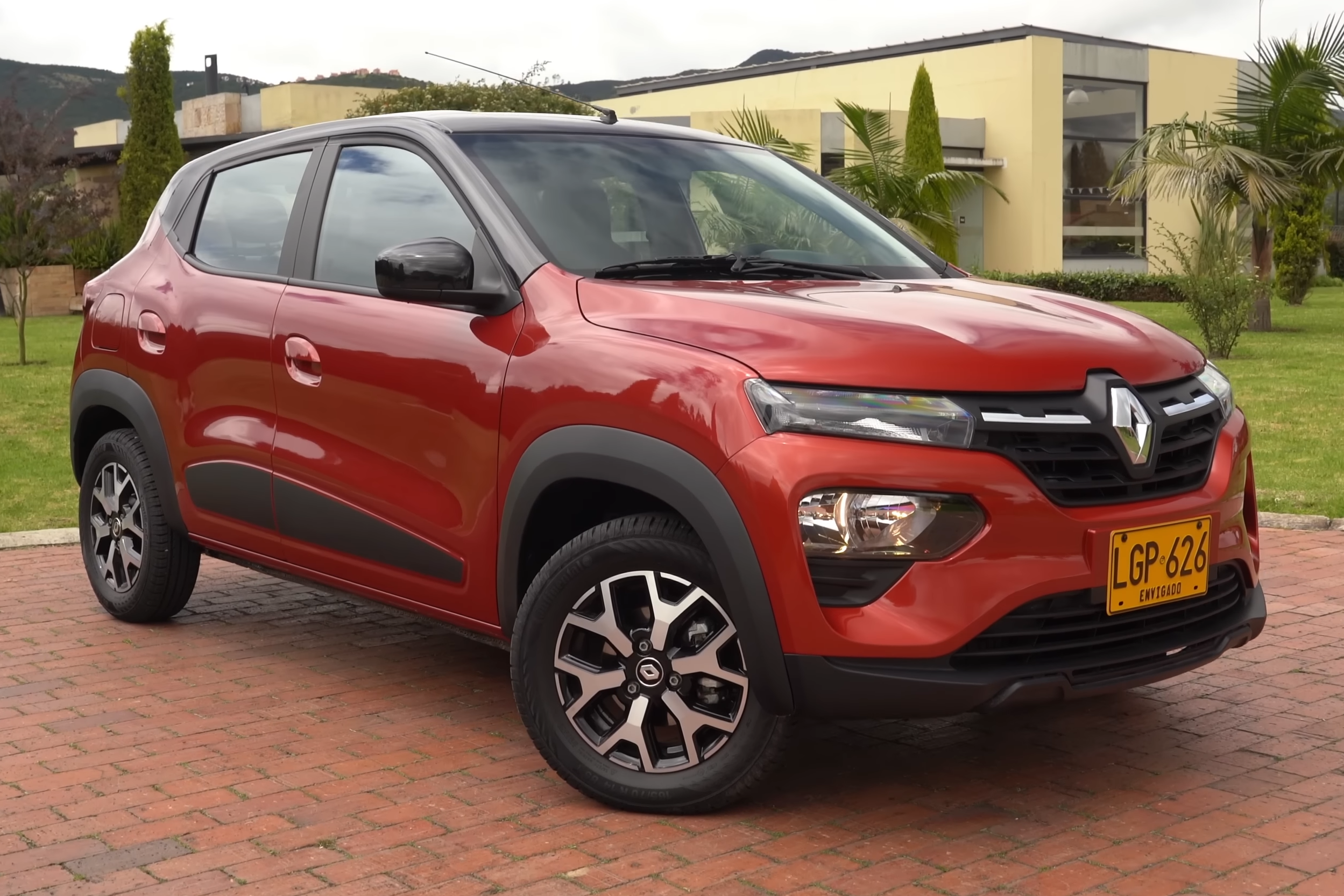
Renault Kwid (facelift)

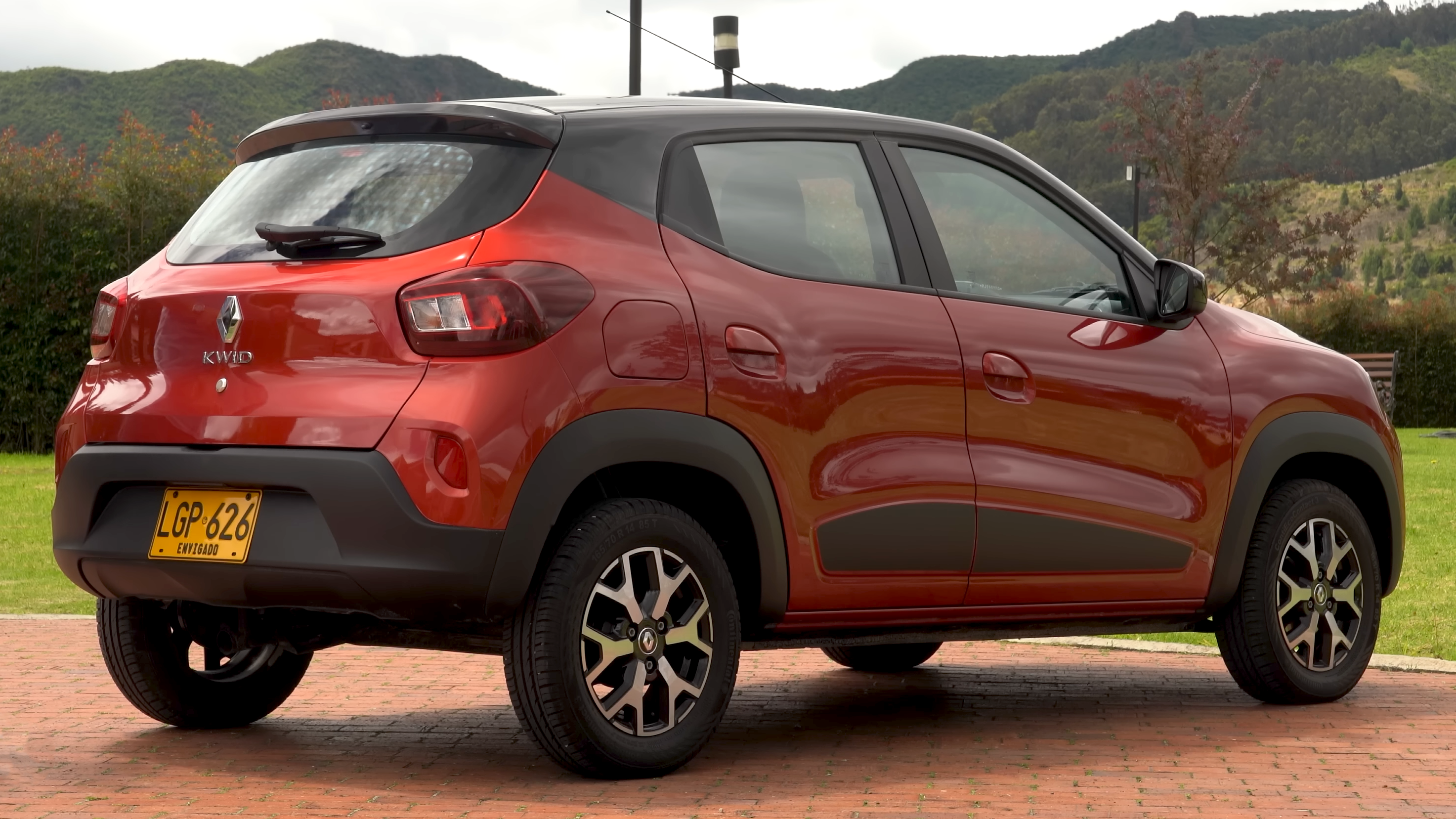
Rear view

=== Facelift (2026) ===
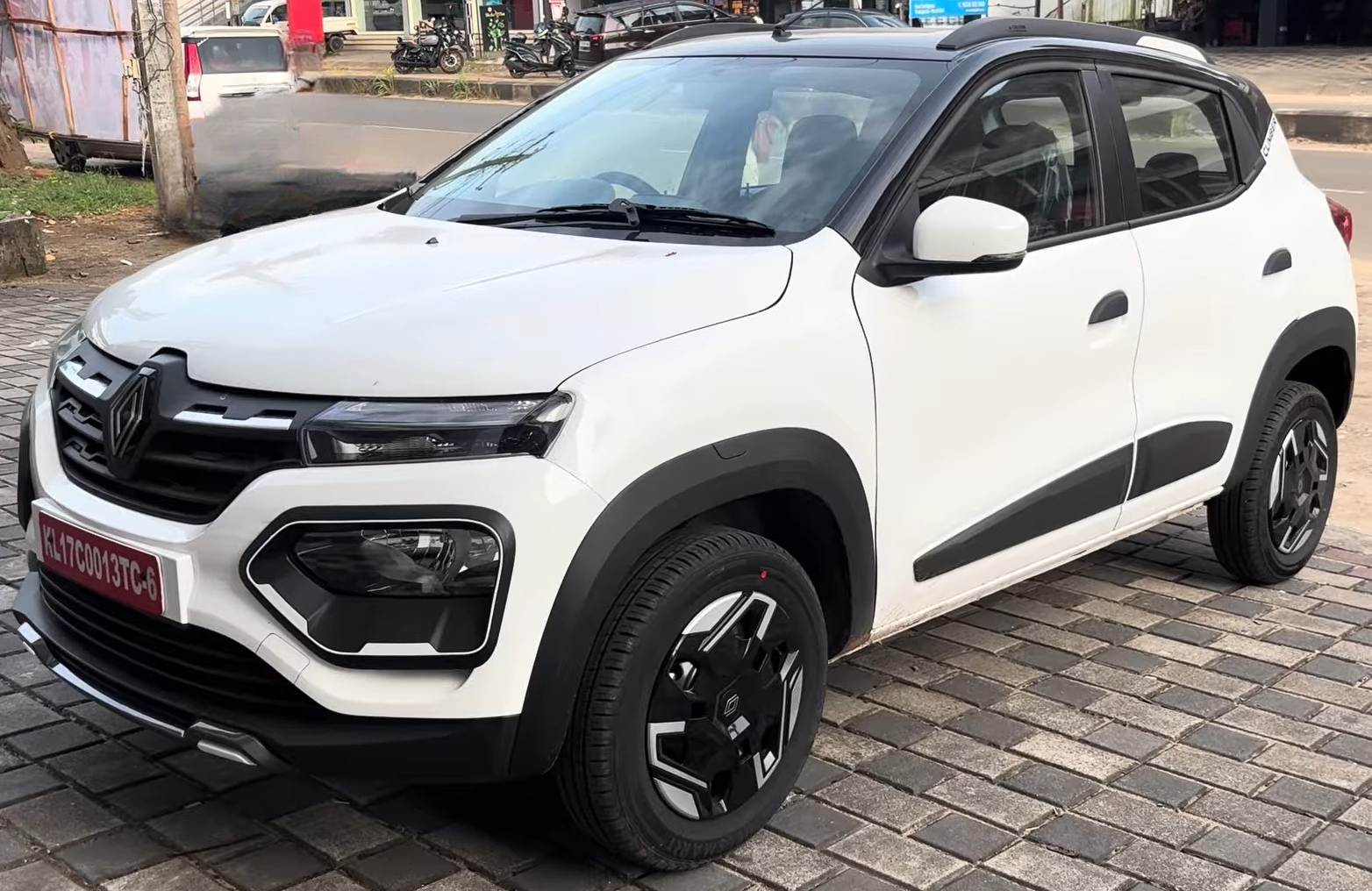
Renault Kwid facelift 2026

==== India ====
On 3 July 2026, Renault launched a facelift of the Kwid in India, featuring a new logo overall and new wheel covers, starting at ₹4.53 lakh (ex-showroom). The refresh streamlined the lineup by discontinuing the Authentic and Techno trims to offer only the Evolution and Climber variants while introducing an official retrofitted CNG kit option for manual transmission models.

== Safety ==
The Kwid is equipped with rear drum brakes.

=== Global NCAP ===
At tests conducted in 2016, the Indian version of the Kwid with no ABS scored a 0-star rating for adult occupants and 2 stars for infants from Global NCAP 1.0 (similar to Latin NCAP 2013). The Kwid was also criticised for being one of the Indian models not having airbags as standard. Renault and other car manufacturers made objections to Global NCAP for its methodology and for ignoring India's own safety criteria, complaints also made in other regions as the NCAPs try to raise the safety level beyond that prescribed by the local regulators, which corresponds to 0-stars. One version with driver airbag obtained 1 star for adult occupants but also 1 star for infants the same year. A two-airbag version for Africa was tested in 2020 and obtained 2 stars for both (similar to Latin NCAP 2013).

Global NCAP 1.0 test results (India) Renault Kwid (I) – No Airbags (2016, similar to Latin NCAP 2013)
Test	Score	Stars
Adult occupant protection	0.00/17.00	0 /5 stars
Child occupant protection	23.89/49.00	2 /5 stars

Global NCAP 1.0 test results (India) Renault Kwid (III) – No Airbags (2016, similar to Latin NCAP 2013)
Test	Score	Stars
Adult occupant protection	0.00/17.00	0 /5 stars
Child occupant protection	14.85/49.00	2 /5 stars

Global NCAP 1.0 test results (India) Renault Kwid (III) – Driver Airbags (2016, similar to Latin NCAP 2013)
Test	Score	Stars
Adult occupant protection	0.00/17.00	0 /5 stars
Child occupant protection	16.63/49.00	2 /5 stars

Global NCAP 1.0 test results (India) Renault Kwid (IV) – Driver Airbag (2016, similar to Latin NCAP 2013)
Test	Score	Stars
Adult occupant protection	8.28/17.00	1 /5 stars
Child occupant protection	10.91/49.00	1 /5 stars

=== Latin NCAP ===
The Brazilian-built Kwid in its most basic Latin American market configuration with 4 airbags and no ESC got a 3-star rating for both adults and infants from Latin NCAP 2.0 in 2017.

Latin NCAP 2.0 test results Renault Kwid + 4 Airbags (2017, based on Euro NCAP 2008)
Test	Points	Stars
Adult occupant:	22.85/34.0	3 /5 stars
Child occupant:	33.87/49.00	3 /5 stars

=== ASEAN NCAP ===
ASEAN NCAP test results Renault Kwid (2018)
Test	Points
Overall:	0 /5 stars
Adult occupant:	10.12
Child occupant:	14.56
Safety assist:	0.00

== Engines ==
Motor	Type	Displacement	Power	Torque	Top speed	Transmission	0–100 km/h	Fuel consumption
Petrol
0.8 SCe	I3	799 cc	40 kW (54 hp)	72 N⋅m at 4400 rpm	143 km/h	5-speed manual	16,4 s	4,1 L
1.0 SCe	I3	999 cc	50 kW (68 hp)	91 N⋅m at 4250 rpm	157 km/h	5-speed manual	13,9 s	4,7 L

== Sales ==
Year	India	South Africa	Brazil	Argentina	Colombia	Mexico	Global
2015	17,933						
2016	105,745						111,688
2017	92,440	8,027	22,576	430			124,807
2018	66,815	9,695	67,320	22,578			171,088
2019	53,438	11,848	85,117	12,058	8,706	7,196	183,989
2020	37,927	6,017	49,476	7,657	7,695	9,709	117,898
2021	31,656	7,919	52,922	3,168	8,410	11,368	120,056
2022	23,127	9,770	57,019	57	8,351	13,809	123,364
2023		6,222	63,321		4,805	19,906	
2024			57,285		3,744	17,195	
2025			60,275			18,158	

== Renault City K-ZE ==
Renault City K-ZE
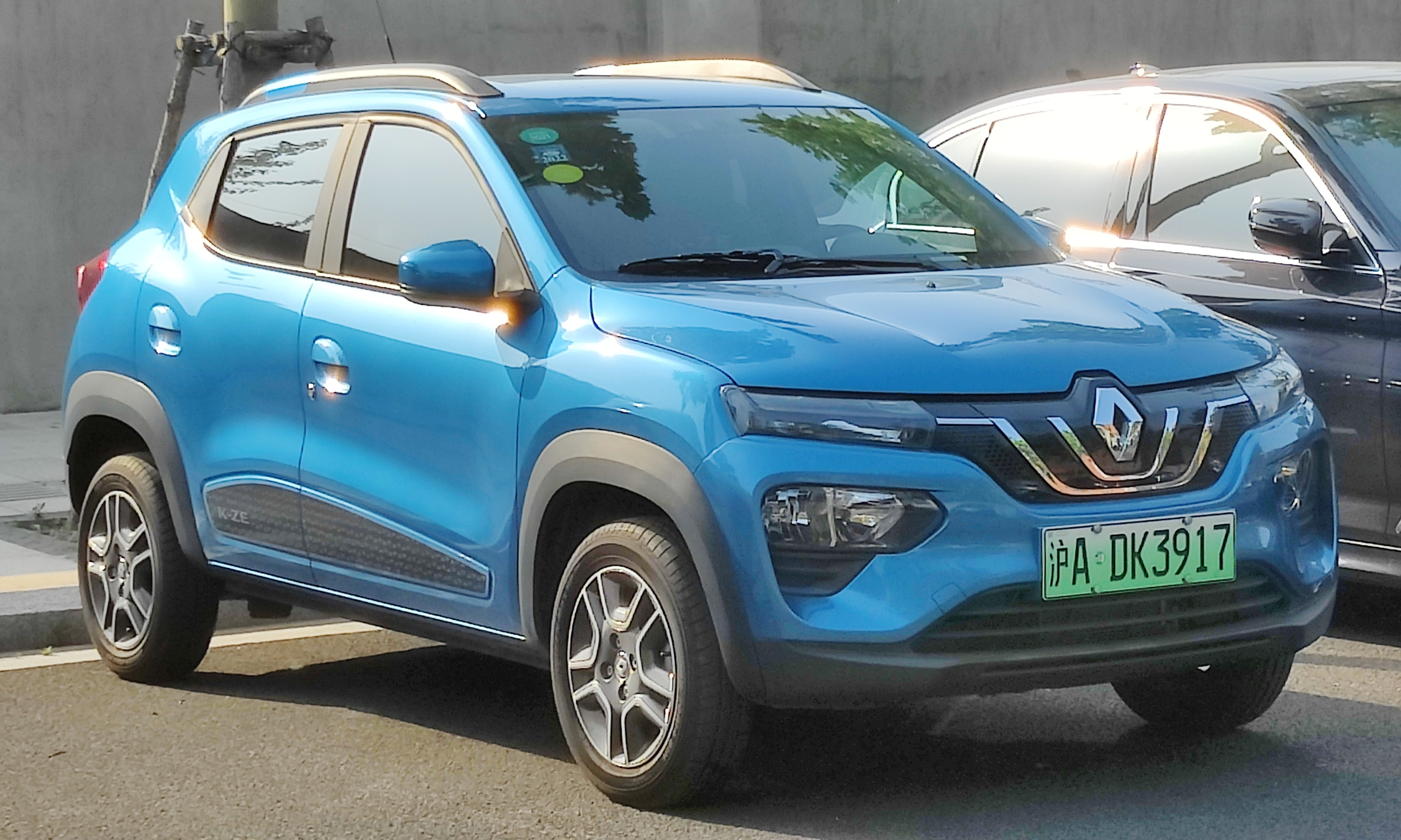

Overview
- Manufacturer: Renault
- Also called: Renault Kwid E-Tech Electric (South America); Dacia Spring Electric (Europe); Venucia e30; Dongfeng Aeolus EX1/Fengxing T1 /Fengguang E1/Nano Box; Forthing T1
- Production: 2019–present
- Assembly: China: Shiyan, Hubei (eGT New Energy Automotive); Slovenia: Novo Mesto, Revoz manufacturing plant (2nd Generation, 2027 Model Year)

Body and chassis
- Class: Crossover city car (A)
- Body style: 5-door hatchback
- Layout: Front motor, front-wheel drive
- Platform: Renault CMFA-EV platform Renault AmpR-Small Architecture (2nd Generation, 2027 Model Year)

Powertrain
- Electric motor: Permanent magnet synchronous
- Power output: 33 kW (45 hp)
- Battery: 26.8 kWh Li-ion; 27.4 kWh Li-ion (Dacia Spring Electric)

Dimensions
- Wheelbase: 2,423 mm (95.4 in)
- Length: 3,740 mm (147.2 in)
- Width: 1,580 mm (62.2 in)
- Height: 1,480 mm (58.3 in)

The Renault City K-ZE is a battery electric version of Renault Kwid, manufactured since 2019 in a facility in Shiyan, Hubei owned by eGT New Energy Automotive, a joint venture between Dongfeng, Renault and Nissan. A concept car was shown initially at the 2018 Paris Motor Show, and the final production model debuted in April 2019 at Shanghai Motor Show, going on sale later in September. Using a dedicated variant of the CMF-A platform, named CMFA-EV, the K-ZE is Renault's smallest electric vehicle, sitting beneath the Renault Zoe. It is notable for its low price, starting at less than $8,700 after incentives.

The model also introduced first hand the facelift for the ICE-powered Renault Kwid, launched in India in October 2019. In the front, the City K-ZE featured split headlamps consisting of LED daytime running lights, turning lights and positioning lights in the top portion and the main beam in the bottom portion. It also received tail lights with C-shaped LED light guides. Each wheel is fixed by 4 nuts instead of 3 like on the ICE versions. Currently, the electric models are not produced in a right-hand drive configuration.

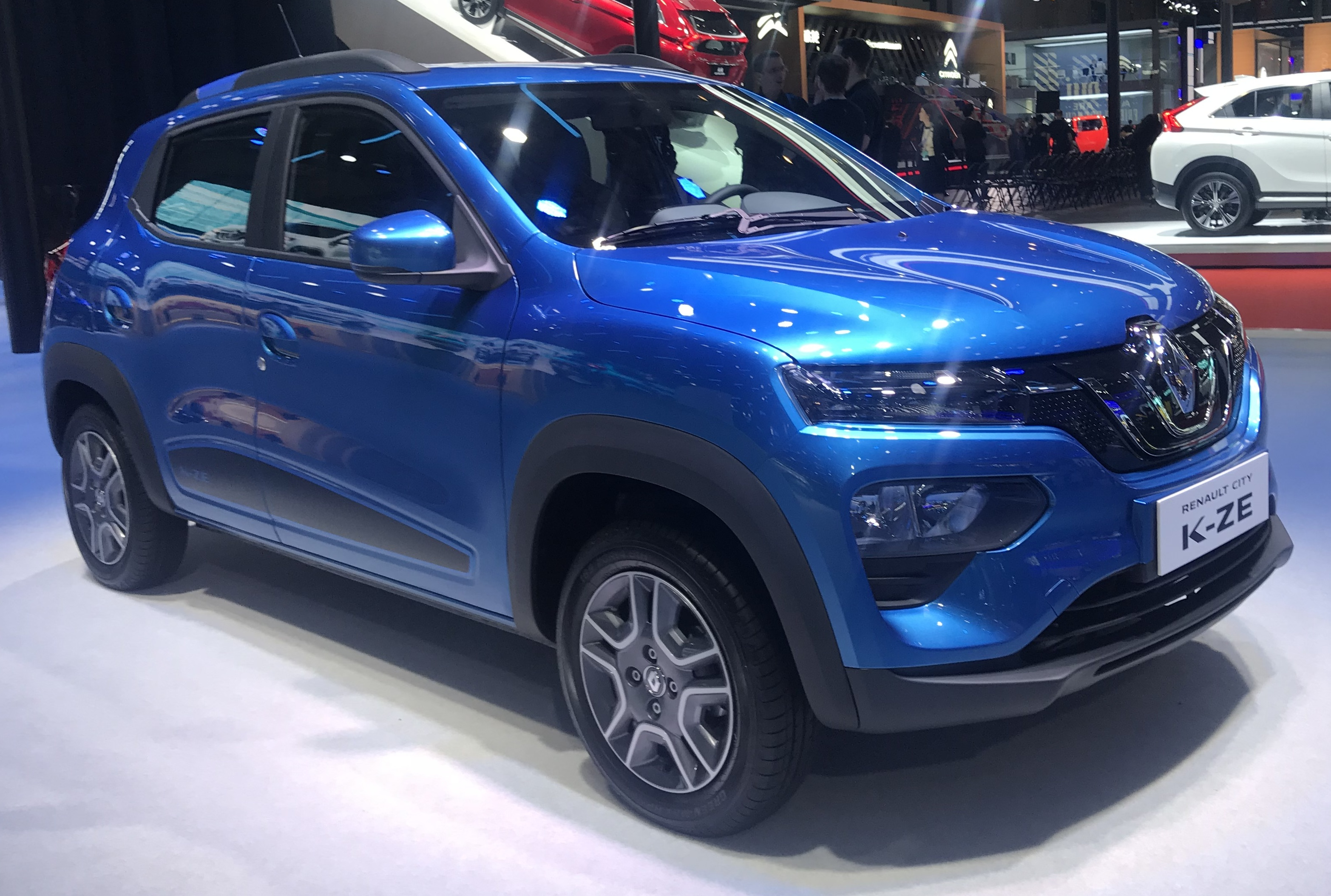
Front view

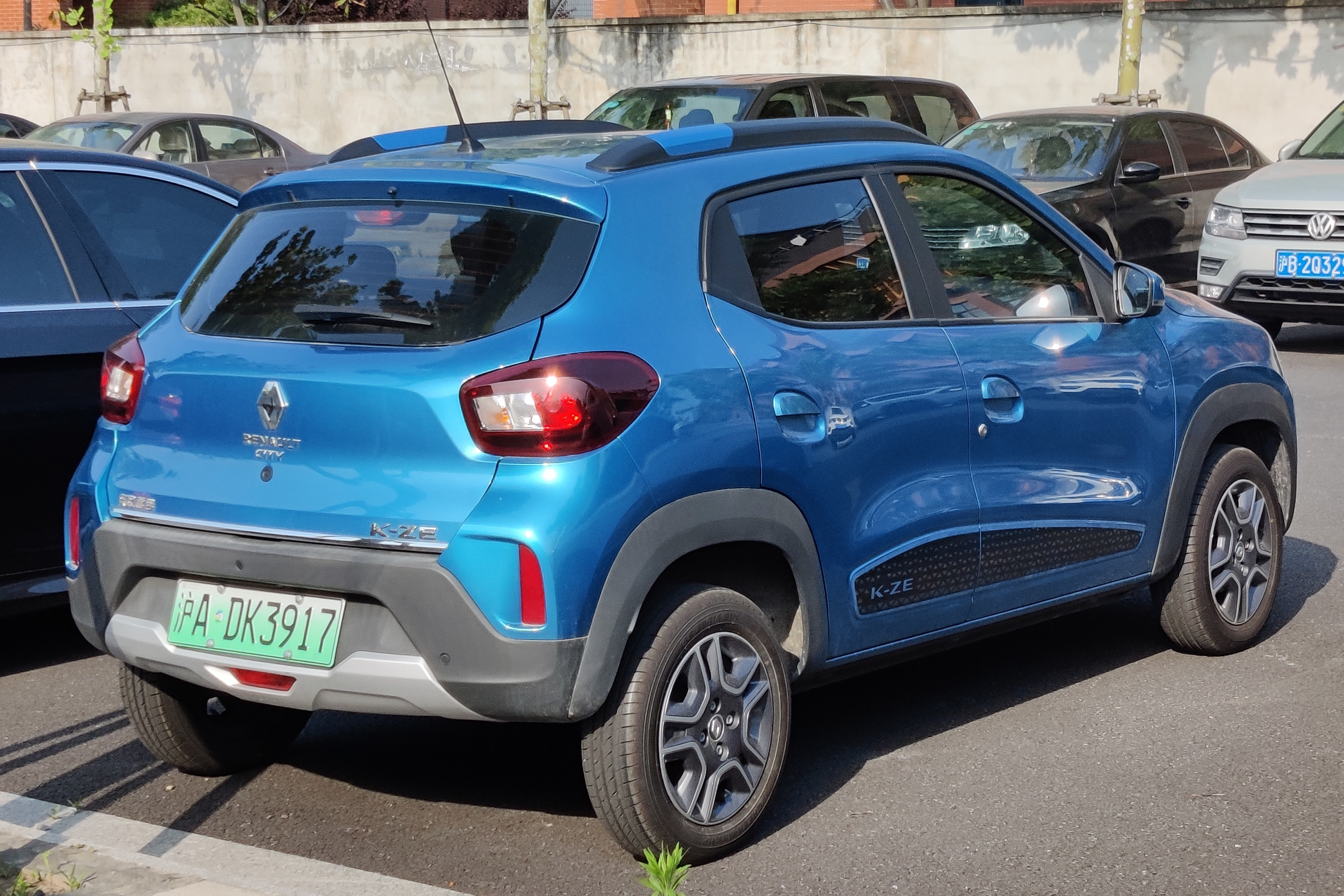
Rear view

=== Specifications ===
The vehicle uses a 26.8 kWh lithium-ion battery and is powered by a 33 kW (45 PS), 125 N⋅m (92 lb⋅ft) front-mounted electric motor driving the front wheels.

DC fast charging from 0% to 80% takes 50 minutes.

The EPA range is not given and can be estimated at 100 miles (160 km); this is based on the car's NEDC range and the ratio of the EPA range to the NEDC range available for another BEV city car, the Smart EQ Fortwo. While the car is rated at 271 km (168 mi) in China, this is based on the NEDC cycle, no longer in use in Europe as it gives wildly inaccurate results, especially for EVs.

Optional equipment includes an infotainment system with a 8-inch (200 mm) touchscreen, a backup camera and manual air conditioning. A smartphone app allows remote monitoring of the vehicle's status.

=== Pricing and reception ===
...this entry-level electric vehicle (EV) looks set to become the real “Tesla Killer” simply because it's the cheapest EV anywhere. The cheapest version of this Renault baby retails for a mere $8,700, or four times cheaper than the cheapest Tesla. Contrast that with the cheapest Tesla Model 3 with its $38,990 price tag and the $29,990 price for the Nissan Leaf...

— the International Business Times

With the price starting at RMB 61,800 (US$9,581.4) after incentives, which puts it at RMB 72,888 (US$11,300.47) without them, this electric car is very affordable by Western standards.

The City K-ZE represents a category of budget electric city cars that are popular in China but virtually nonexistent in the West. Among these, it is likely the first to carry the badge of a Western marque. In general, the prices of electric vehicles are much lower in China than in the US or Europe, and they are exhibiting a downward trend, while in the West, prices are showing an upward trend. A report by JATO Dynamics indicates that an all-electric car priced at $1 in 2011 would, as of 2019, cost $0.52 in China, compared to $1.42 in Europe and $1.55 in the US.

The car was launched in China on 10 September 2019.

The International Business Times wrote that it looks set to become the real "Tesla Killer" simply because of its low price, while erroneously stating it's the cheapest EV in the world (there are even cheaper EVs in China).

=== Dongfeng brands-badged models ===
Alongside the production version of the City K-ZE, Dongfeng Nissan showed off their version of an electric Kwid under the Venucia brand in the form of the Venucia e30. Going on sale in December 2019, the e30 is essentially a badge engineered City K-ZE, sharing the same basic powertrain and design. The e30 name was previously used on another badged engineered EV based on the first generation Nissan Leaf.

Dongfeng-Fengshen also unveiled the Aeolus EX1 during the 2019 Chengdu Auto Show. The EX1 is powered by an electric motor with a maximum power output of 33 kW (45 hp). As of December 2020, the Aeolus EX1 was relaunched as the Dongfeng EV EX1 sold under the Dongfeng EV brand.

In July 2022, a restyled version was introduced as the Dongfeng Nano Box sold under the Dongfeng EV brand and positioned above the Dongfeng EV EX1. In opposite of Venucia and Aeolus models—both of them with their front end inspired on the first ICE-powered Renault Kwid design—this one is more based on the City K-ZE fascia itself, but with more original design tweaks, thanks to plastic-molded components, much cheaper to modify than steel parts. Despite running the same engine as the other models, Dongfeng promises the Nano Box can run 331 km (206 mi) in the Chinese test cycle.

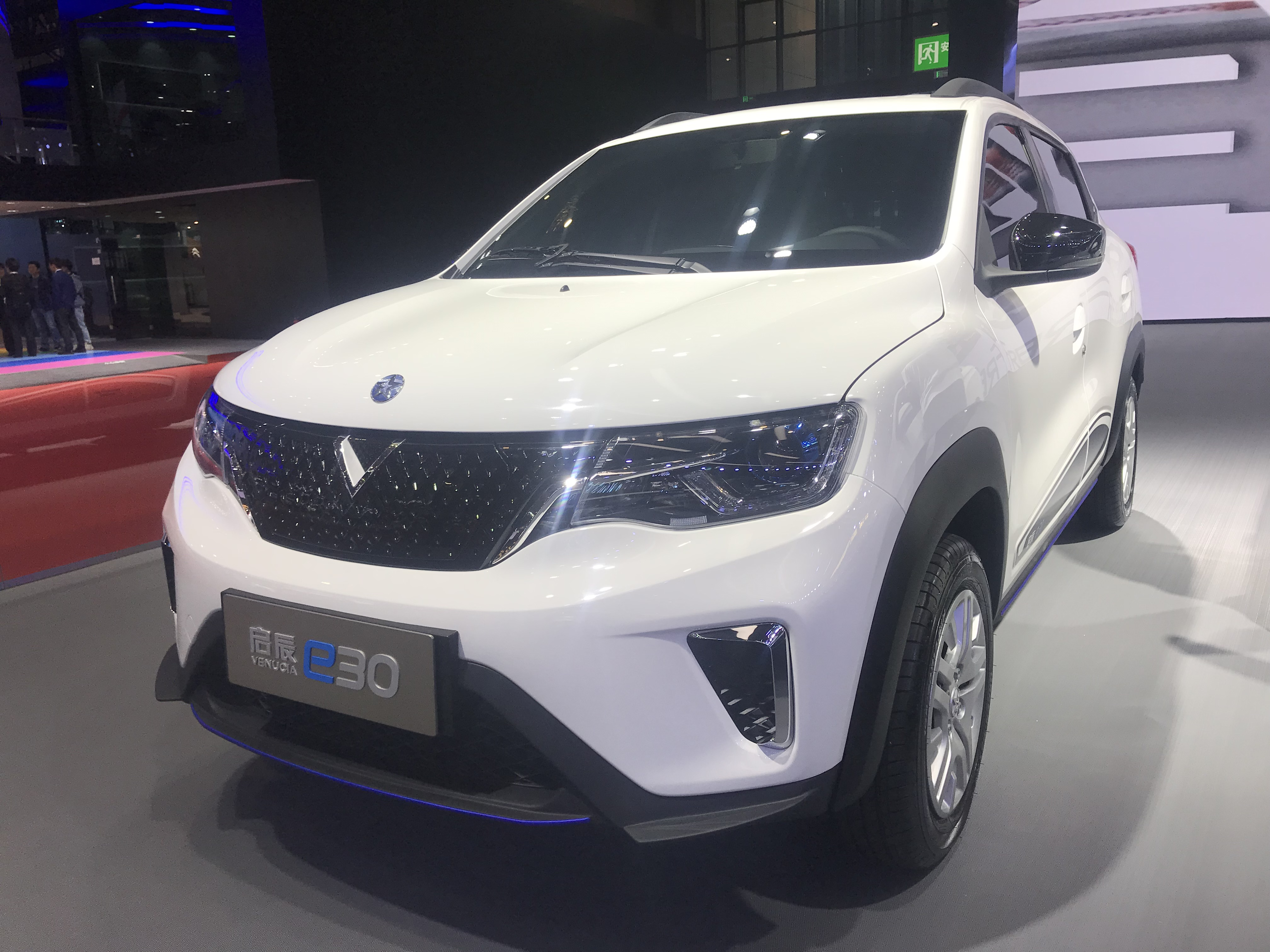
Venucia e30

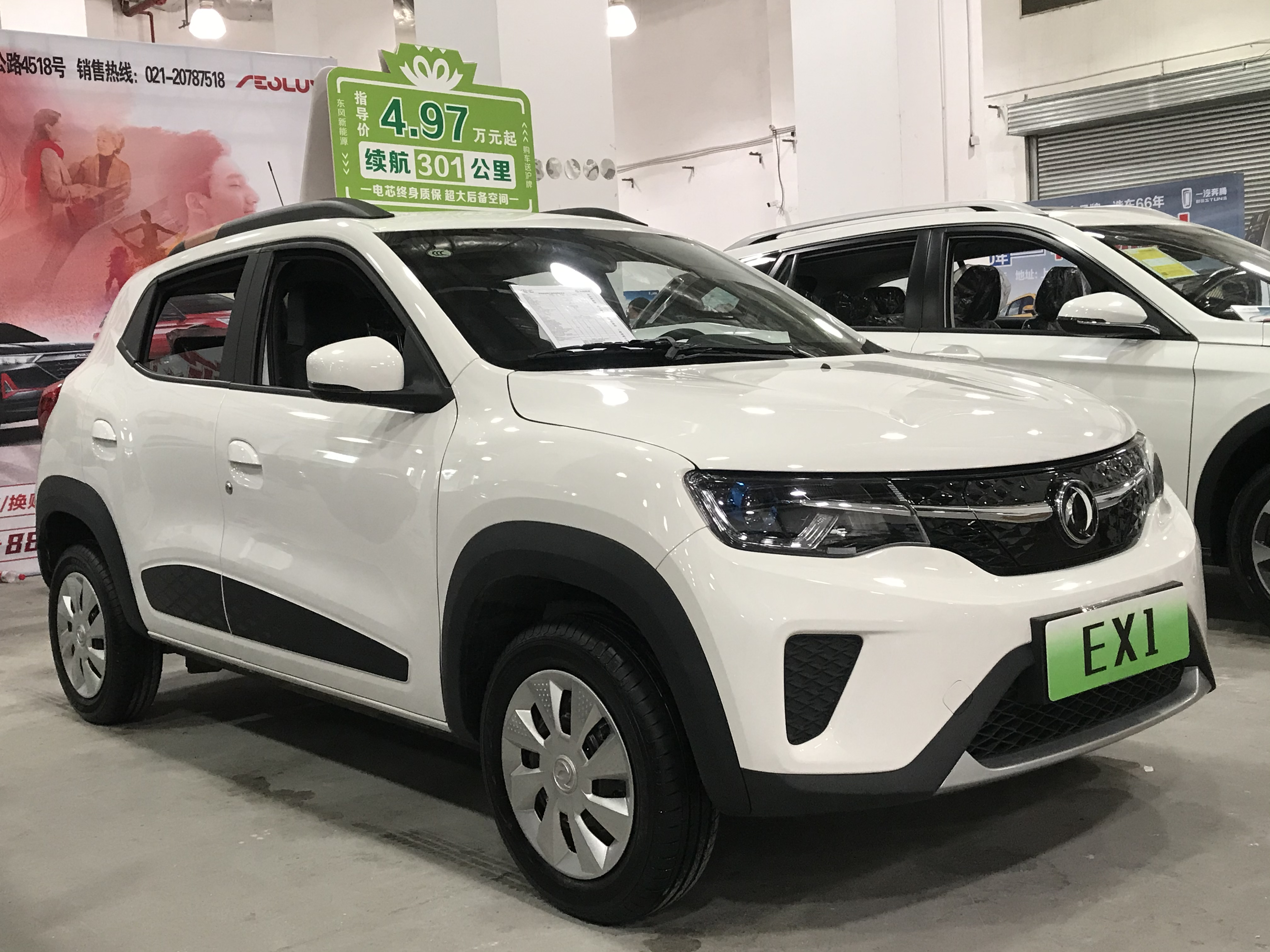
Aeolus EX1 (Fengshen EX1)

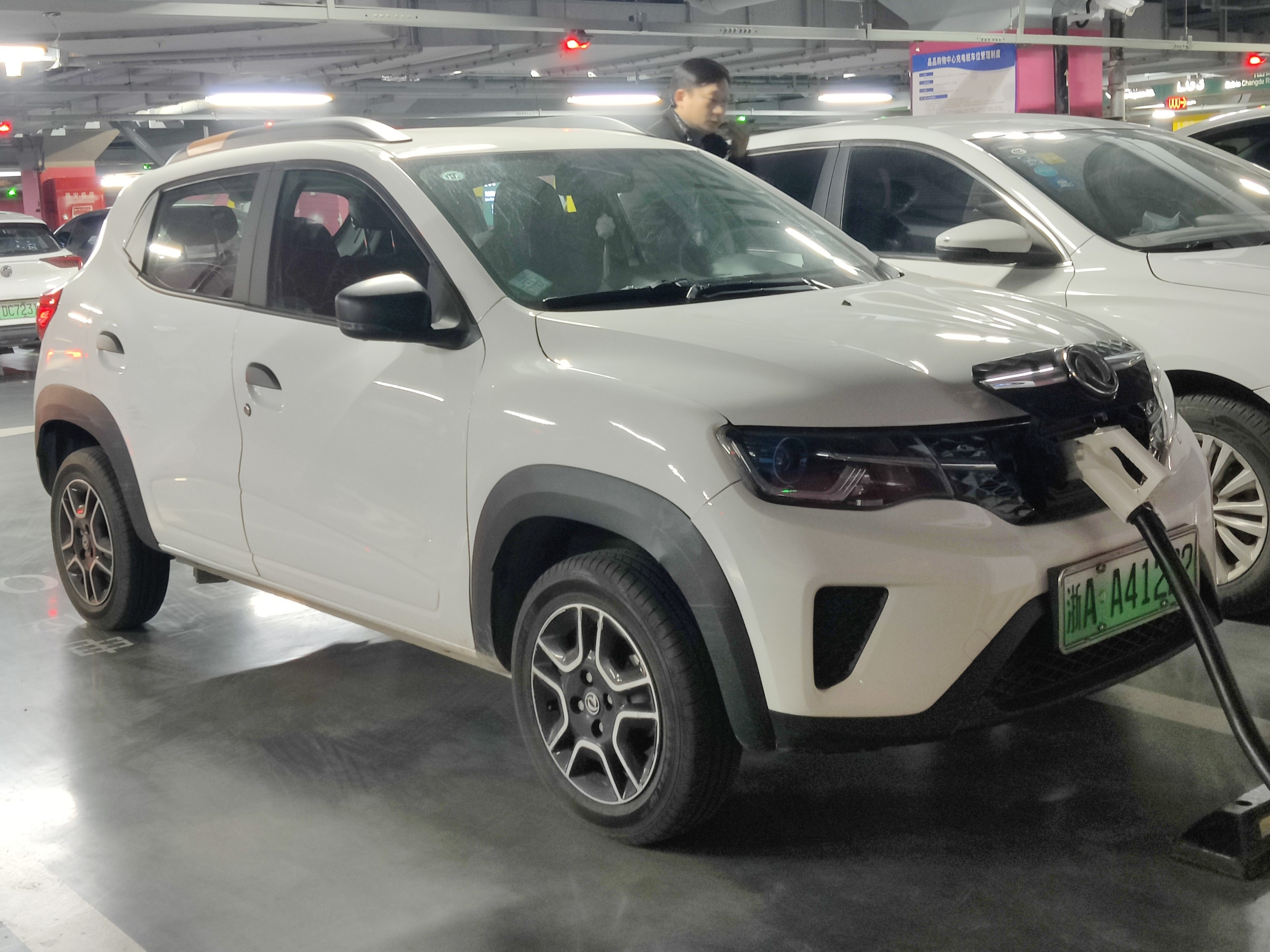
Dongfeng EV EX1 Pro

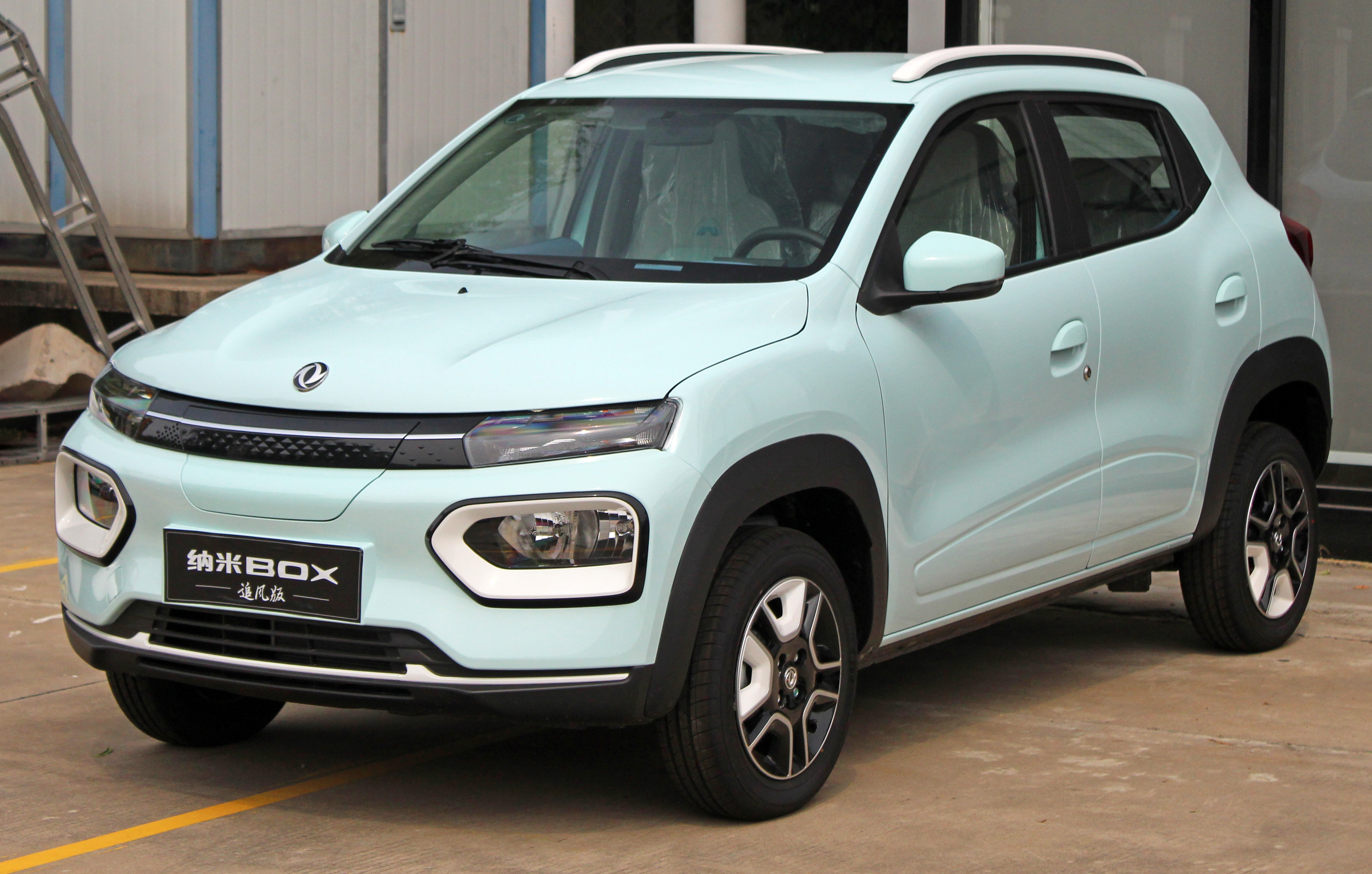
Dongfeng EX1 Nano Box

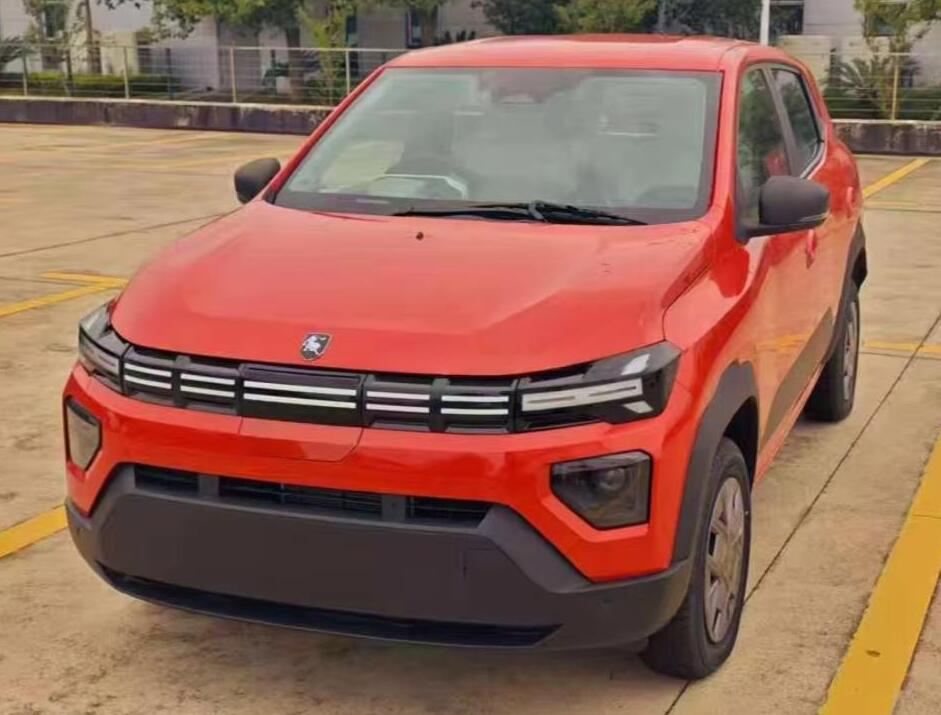
Forthing T1

== Dacia Spring Electric ==
Sold by Dacia for the European market, the first generation Dacia Spring was based off the Renault City K-ZE.

=== Renault Kwid E-Tech ===
The City K-ZE also began to be exported to Brazil in 2022 as a Renault Kwid top-range version, named the Renault Kwid E-Tech Electric, matching the current Renault branding for electric vehicles.

The Brazilian version has a 48 kW (65 PS) motor rather than the 33 kW (45 PS) used in the Chinese version, which is still less than the 53 kW (72 PS) of the 1.0-litre ICE version. It weighs 977 kg (2,154 lb) instead of the 818 kg (1,803 lb) of the standard Brazilian ICE version, so it can carry 4 people instead of 5 in the latter.

In 2023, the Kwid E-Tech Electric starts to be exported to most Latin America countries.

== Kwid concept ==
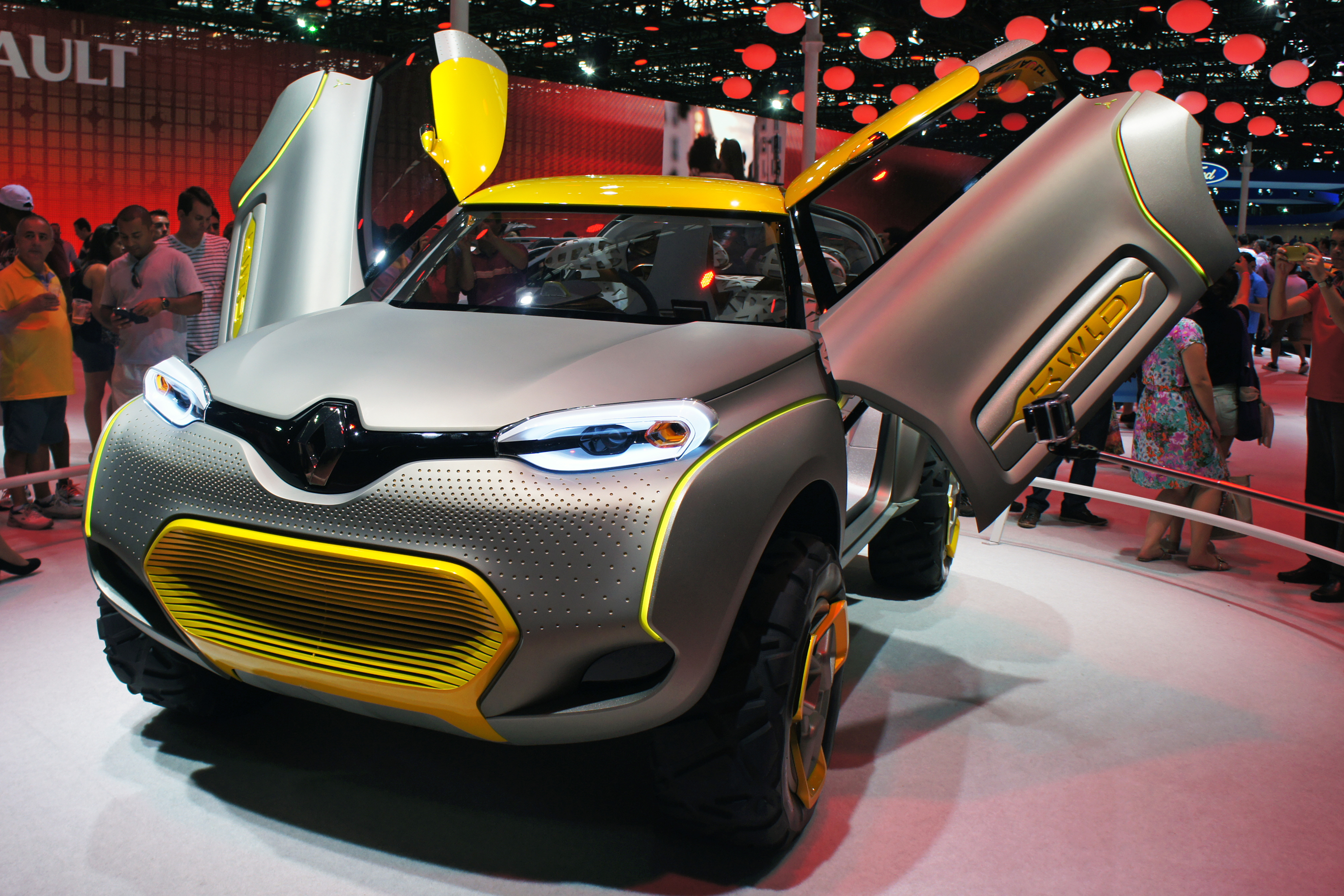
The Renault Kwid Concept at the 2014 São Paulo International Motor Show

The Renault Kwid concept was unveiled at the 2014 Auto Expo in India. The SUV-like concept incorporates a roof-mounted, remote-controlled quadcopter (called the "Flyer Companion"), butterfly doors and has large R16 wheels. According to Renault, the interior was "inspired by a nest" and has a 3-seat front and 2-seat rear arrangement.
