= Renault India =

Franco-Indian car manufacturer

Renault India Private Limited
- Type: Subsidiary
- Industry: Automotive
- Founded: October 2005; 21 years ago
- Headquarters: Chennai, India
- Key people: Venkatram Mamillapalle (Managing director) Stephane Deblaise
- Products: Automobiles
- Parent: Renault
- Website: renault.co.in

Renault India Private Limited is a fully owned subsidiary of Renault, France. It currently offers three models in the Indian market: the hatchback Kwid, the compact MPV Triber and the compact SUV Kiger.

== History ==
In February 2008, Renault-Nissan Alliance signed a memorandum of understanding with the Government of Tamil Nadu to set up a manufacturing plant in Oragadam near Chennai. Work on the plant began in June of the same year, and was completed in 21 months. Renault Design India was the first vehicle design studio set up by a foreign manufacturer in India. It was established in Mumbai in September 2008. The design house is integral to Renault's operations in India. One of its functions is to monitor customer trends and customize global products for India. At the end of 2015, Renault had approximately 200 dealerships across India, from only 14 in 2012.

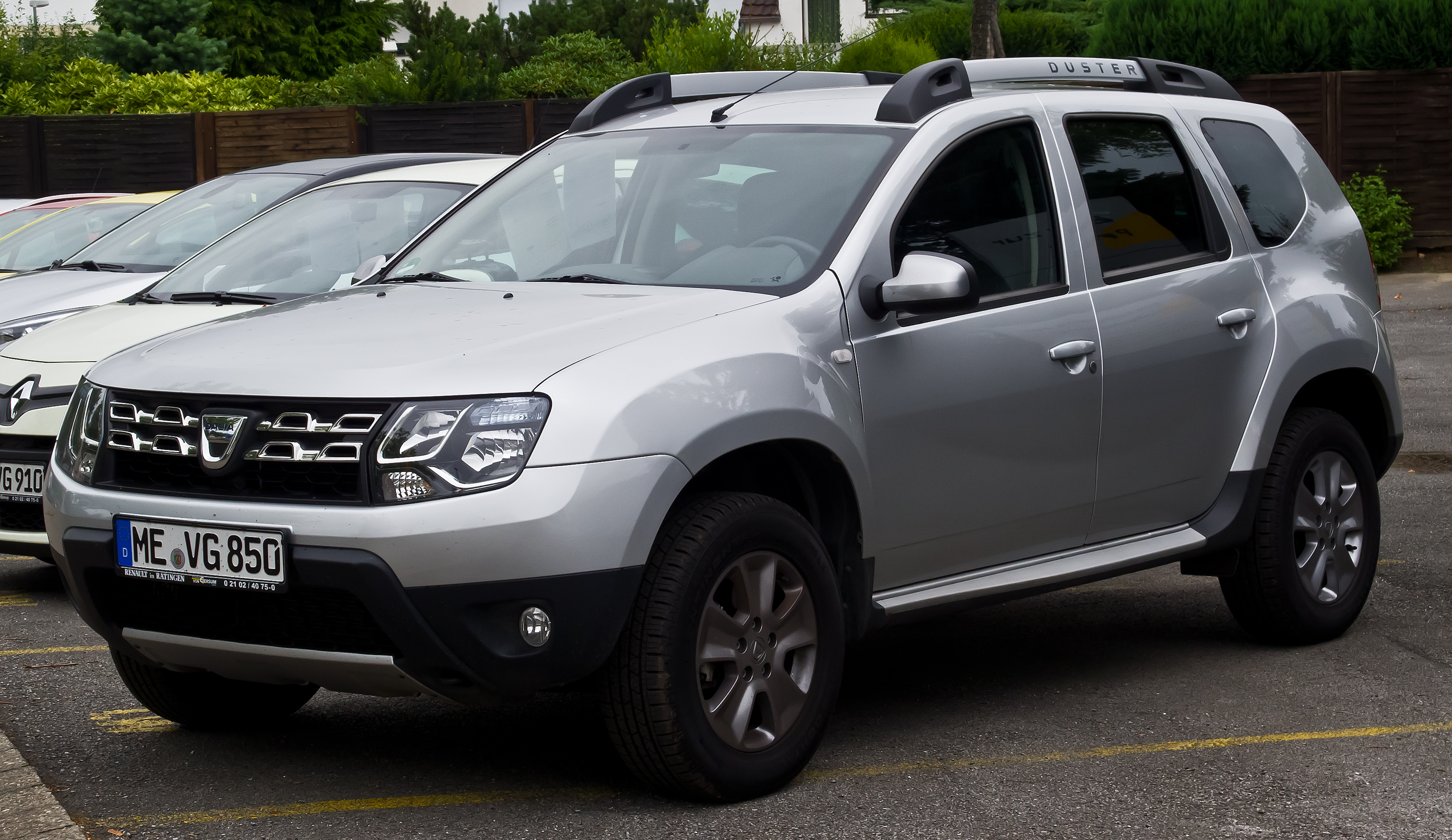
Renault Duster named 2013 Indian Car of the Year (ICOTY), got a total of 29 awards

The Renault Duster received more awards than any other car brand in India between 2012 and 2015. The Renault Duster received 29 awards in India, and the Renault company 34 awards.

- Indian Car of the Year (ICOTY): Duster, Car of the Year
- Autocar and Bloomberg TV: Duster, Car of the Year, Viewers' Choice, and SUV of the Year
- NDTV: Duster, Car of the Year and Compact SUV of the Year; Scala, Creative TV Commercial of the Year; Pulse, Premium Hatch of the Year; and Renault India, Car Manufacturer of the Year
- Top Gear: Duster, Compact SUV of the Year and Readers' Choice for the BBC and Times of India
- Car India: Duster, SUV of the Year
- Overdrive and CNBC-TV 18: Duster, Compact SUV of the Year
- Vicky.in, Motor Vikatan (Chennai) and Team BHP: Duster, Car of the Year
- Zigwheels and Economic Times: Duster, Car of the Year, Readers' Choice and entry-level SUV of the Year
- AutoJunction.in: Duster, Car of the Year and Utility Vehicle of the Year; Renault Pulse, SuperMini of the Year; Renault Scala, Mid-size Sedan of the Year

== Operations & Sales ==
In September 2008, Renault India opened its fifth global vehicle design studio in Mumbai.

In March 2010, Renault India and Nissan India opened a production facility in Chennai, which was established with an initial investment of Rs 45 billion (US$990 million). The plant has a combined annual capacity to produce 480,000 vehicles.

As of September 2015, Renault India had 175 dealerships in 16 cities across 9 states and 2 Union Territories, targeting 210 outlets at the end of 2015. It expanded to 190 dealerships in December 2015. Its expansion was attributed to the success of the Renault Kwid. Renault also developed virtual showrooms and some specific phone apps. As at 2015, Renault had 270 dealership across India.

Calendar Year	Sales
2011	1406
2012	35157
2013	64368
2014	44849
2015	53419
2016	132235
2017	112489
2018	82368
2019	88869
2020	89534

== Models ==
=== Current models ===
Model	Indian introduction	Current model		Notes
Model	Indian introduction	Introduction	Update (facelift)	Notes
Hatchback
Kwid	2015	2015	2019	
SUV/crossover
Kiger	2021	2021	2025	
Duster	2012	2026	—	Rebadged from Dacia Duster
MPV
Triber	2019	2019	2025	

The Kwid is Renault's first sub Rs 4 lakh segment car (earlier codenamed XBA). It was fully developed in India by Gérard Detourbet and his French and Indian team.

=== Discontinued models ===
Model	Released	Discontinued	Image
Fluence	2011	2017	
Koleos	2011	2017	
Pulse	2012	2018	
Scala	2012	2018	
Lodgy	2015	2020	(Dacia Lodgy pictured)
Captur	2017	2020	

== Milestones ==
2008

- Renault-Nissan Alliance signs a memorandum of understanding with the Government of Tamil Nadu to set up a manufacturing plant in Oragadam near Chennai
- The Renault DeSign Studio opened in Mumbai. It is one of the 5 satellite global design studios for Renault, monitoring customer trends and helping customize global products for India.
- Launch of International Logistics Network (ILN) in Pune handling components sourced from Indian suppliers for all Renault-Nissan Alliance production plants worldwide, in particular South Africa & Brazil.

2010

- Inauguration of the Renault-Nissan Alliance manufacturing facility in Chennai (investment of Rs. 4500 crores with a capacity to produce 480,000 cars per year).

2011

- Renault launches its first car in India, the Fluence.
- Renault – Nissan Alliance manufacturing facility rolls out its 100,000th car.
- All new Koleos global launch in India.
- Announcement of localization of the Renault K9K diesel engine.
- K9K powered Renault Pulse unveiled at the 2011 Indian Grand Prix by Formula1 drivers Mark Webber and Karun Chandok.

2012

- Renault launches the Pulse and unveils the Duster at the New Delhi Auto Expo 2012.
- Renault Scala launched in New Delhi.
- Renault encourages employee engagement, wins the 'Inter-corporate competition RED 2012' along with team of partners Nissan, RNAIPL & RNTBCI.

2013

- Inauguration of the new warehouse for the Renault Alliance International Parts Center (IPC) in Pune, earlier working since 2008 as ILN (see above).
- Renault launched the Gang of Dusters, the official community for Duster owners.
- Since the launch of the brand in early 2011, Renault has won over 43 awards till date. The Renault Duster alone receiving 29 awards, and pioneered a new segment of crossover SUV at low-to-medium cost in the Indian auto sector.
- Inauguration of the new warehouse for the Renault Alliance International Parts Center (IPC) in Chennai as a part of expansion.

2014

- Renault reaches landmark of 100,000 cars on Indian roads in less than 3 years of operation in India.

2015

- Looking to make a mark in the hatchback segment, Renault India launched the Kwid on September 24, 2015, at a starting price of Rs 2.56 lakh (ex-showroom Delhi). The most expensive variant of the car costs Rs 3.53 lakh(ex-showroom). The Renault Kwid has better features than any of its competitors.

The Kwid, based on the CMF-A platform, measures 3,679 mm in length, 1,579 mm in width, 1,478 mm in height and 2,422 mm in wheelbase. It has a ground clearance of 180 mm and a fuel tank capacity of 28-litre.

Features seen on the top-end variant include power steering, AC, front power windows, foglights, keyless entry and central locking, a 7-inch touchscreen MediaNAV system with Bluetooth, USB, AUX-in, an optional driver airbag and some design customizations.

- An updated version of the Duster is launched in October 2015.

2023

- On February 13, 2023, Renault and Nissan were planning to announce the launch of 6 new models for the Indian market.

2024

- Renault India sells over 1 million vehicles in India.
- Plans to launch an electric car by 2025.
- Opens a new R&D center in Bangalore.
- Invests more in manufacturing in Chennai.
- Focuses on social responsibility with local partnerships.
- Introduces a new Kwid variant with safety and tech upgrades.
- Improves customer service with extended warranties and service packages.

2025

- Renault launches the facelifted Triber and Kiger in India.

== Associations ==
=== Spellinc ===
Renault India's Corporate Social Responsibility (CSR) program commenced in 2013, focusing on education and road safety. It partnered with Linc Pen & Plastics Ltd for SPELLINC. The program started in September 2013 and ran until December across 8 cities (Delhi, Mumbai, Kolkata, Chennai, Bangalore, Ahmadabad, Jamshedpur and Ranchi) with a total of 1000 schools participating. The training module on road safety has been developed to be fun and interactive. It involves stage acts, singing and discussions with the students, with the aim of the operation to reach students and to convert them into Road Safety ambassadors.

=== Tour De India ===
Renault India supported the Tour De India 2013, a cycling event held for the first time in 2012. Tour de India 2013 was held in December with 3 races involving both competitive and entertaining cycling. Renault India was the Official Automobile Partner for the event, providing cars for the lead convoy, for the cycling teams and the Tour de India fleet in charge of recording the event.

=== Cricket ===
Renault sponsored a cricket series between India and Sri Lanka(2012) and Virat Kohli won the Man of the Series Award – a Renault Duster. The Indian cricket team was taken for a victory lap around the stadium with Mahendra Singh Dhoni(MS Dhoni) behind the wheel of the Renault Duster. The entire cricket team was seen on the SUV while taking the victory lap.

=== MRF Challenge ===
Renault cars compete in the Formula 2000 category of the MRF Challenge. The 20 cars of the category are also powered by Renault Sport 2-litre engines. These 16-valve, 4-cylinder, 1998cc F4R 832 engines can produce a maximum power of 210 bhp at 6,500rpm and maximum torque of 220 Nm at 5500rpm.

=== Limca Record – Renault Scala’s Mileage Run ===
The Renault Scala broke the Limca record for the highest fuel economy achieved in India using a stock car by achieving a real world economy of 54.15 km/L in an un-modified Renault Scala diesel sedan. The car covered the 62.28 km distance using only 1.24 litres, achieving a fuel economy of 54.15 km/L, which is 250.26% over ARAI certified figure. The distance was covered in 76 minutes.
