= Renault Nissan Automotive India =

Automobile manufacturer

Renault Nissan Automotive India Private Limited
- Type: Joint venture
- Industry: Automotive
- Founded: May 2010
- Headquarters: Chennai, Tamil Nadu, India
- Key people: Mr.Keerthi Prakash, MD & CEO
- Products: Automobiles
- Parent: Renault and Nissan
- Website: www.nissan.in www.renault.co.in

Renault Nissan Automotive India Private Limited is the Indian joint venture of Renault and Nissan and part of the Renault–Nissan–Mitsubishi Alliance.

== History ==
Renault Nissan Automotive India Private Limited was established in 2005.

== Manufacturing facilities ==
Renault Nissan Automotive India Private Limited have their manufacturing plant in Oragadam near Chennai. The plant has a capacity of 480,000 vehicles per annum. The capacity is divided equally between Renault India and Nissan Motor India. Renault is constructing a small car powered by an 800cc engine, to compete with Maruti Suzuki's Alto, Hyundai India's Eon and Chevrolet's Spark, in the segment, that makes up for about 40–45% of India's car market. RNAIPL has achieved production target of 5,00,000 lakhs vehicle in the month of October 2013 in the short span of 40 months after start of production. RNAIPL is one of the most profitable company which adopts Japanese manufacturing policy of Genba Kanri. The company works on the style of maximum productivity with minimum resources. But, in due course this manufacturing strategy sometimes frustrates its employees. The small car is likely to be rolled out from the Renault Nissan Alliance plant in Chennai and to hit the market in 2014–15.

In August 2015, RNAIPL put on hold its plans invest ₹5,000 Cr. in India due to non-payment of Investment Promotion Subsidies (IPS) promised by Tamil Nadu. The company claimed that it yet to receive a refund of ₹1,901 Cr and ₹ 822 Cr for IPS and input VAT respectively.

== Technical Center ==
Renault Nissan Technology Business Center India (RNTBCI) located at Mahindra World City, in Chengalpattu, Chennai is one of Nissan and Renault's Global Technical and Development Center. This unit is engaged in shared product development services for Renault and Nissan entities worldwide.

== Models ==
=== Renault ===
==== Current models ====
Model	Indian introduction	Current model		Notes
Model	Indian introduction	Introduction	Update (facelift)	Notes
Hatchback
Kwid	2015	2015	2019	
SUV/crossover
Kiger	2021	2021	2025	
Duster	2012	2026	—	Rebadged from Dacia Duster
MPV
Triber	2019	2019	2025	

The Kwid is Renault's first sub Rs 4 lakh segment car (earlier codenamed XBA). It was fully developed in India by Gérard Detourbet and his French and Indian team.

==== Discontinued models ====
Model	Released	Discontinued	Image
Fluence	2011	2017	
Koleos	2011	2017	
Pulse	2012	2018	
Scala	2012	2018	
Lodgy	2015	2020	(Dacia Lodgy pictured)
Captur	2017	2020	

=== Nissan ===
==== Current models ====
Model	Indian introduction	Current model		Notes
Model	Indian introduction	Introduction	Update (facelift)	Notes
SUV/crossover
Magnite	2020	2020	2024	
Tekton	2026	2026	—	Rebadged from Dacia Duster
X-Trail	2005	2024	—	Imported from Japan
MPV
Gravite	2026	2026	—	Rebadged from Renault Triber

==== Discontinued models ====
Model	Released	Discontinued	Image
Teana	2006	2014	
Micra	2010	2020	
370Z	2011	2013	
Sunny	2011	2020	
Evalia	2012	2017	
Terrano	2013	2020	
GT-R	2016	2022	
Kicks	2019	2023	

=== Datsun ===
==== Discontinued models ====
Model	Released	Discontinued	Image
Go	2014	2022	
Go+	2015	2022	
redi-Go	2016	2022	

== Sales and service network ==
=== RIPL ===
As of 2015, Renault India has 224 outlets in India.

=== NMIPL ===
As of September 2015, Nissan Motor India has 201 dealerships across 148 cities in India.

== See also ==
- Nissan Motor Company
- Renault S.A.
- Mahindra Renault Limited
- Automobile industry in India
