= Nissan Motor India =

Indian subsidiary company

Nissan Motors India Pvt Ltd
- Type: Subsidiary
- Founded: 2005
- Headquarters: Chennai, Tamil Nadu, India
- Key people: Saurabh Vatsa (managing director)
- Products: Automobiles
- Operating income: 4.8 million$
- Net income: 153 crore
- Total equity: 1400 crore
- Number of employees: 13990
- Parent: Nissan Motor Company
- Website: nissan.in

Nissan Motor India Pvt Ltd is the Indian subsidiary of Nissan Motor Company of Japan.

== History ==
Nissan Motor India Pvt Ltd (NMIPL) is a wholly owned subsidiary of Nissan Motor Co. Ltd Japan. The company was incorporated in 2005 and offers hatchback, MUV, SUV and sedans in India. Nissan in India has a portfolio of two brands, Nissan and Datsun. In February 2008, Nissan, together with its global alliance partner Renault signed a MoU with Government of Tamil Nadu to set up a manufacturing plant at Oragadam, near Chennai with an investment of INR 45 billion over a period of 7 years. On 17 March 2010, the Renault-Nissan alliance plant was inaugurated in a record time of 21 months since its ground breaking ceremony in June 2008.

== Models ==
=== Nissan ===
==== Current models ====
Model	Indian introduction	Current model		Notes
Model	Indian introduction	Introduction	Update (facelift)	Notes
SUV/crossover
Magnite	2020	2020	2024	
Tekton	2026	2026	—	Rebadged from Dacia Duster
X-Trail	2005	2024	—	Imported from Japan
MPV
Gravite	2026	2026	—	Rebadged from Renault Triber

==== Discontinued models ====
Model	Released	Discontinued	Image
Teana	2006	2014	
Micra	2010	2020	
370Z	2011	2013	
Sunny	2011	2020	
Evalia	2012	2017	
Terrano	2013	2020	
GT-R	2016	2022	
Kicks	2019	2023	

=== Datsun ===
==== Discontinued models ====
Model	Released	Discontinued	Image
Go	2014	2022	
Go+	2015	2022	
redi-Go	2016	2022	

== Sales and service network ==
Nissan has assumed full responsibility for the sales, marketing and distribution of all Nissan-branded vehicles in India, with immediate effect from 14 February 2014.

== Sales performance ==
NMIPL registered sales of over 99,000 units in FY 2024 (including 28,000 domestically and 71,000+ units in exports).

== See also ==
- Nissan Motor Company
- Automotive industry in India
