= Nissan Motor Indonesia =

Indonesian subsidiary company

PT Nissan Motor Indonesia
- Type: Subsidiary
- Industry: Automotive
- Predecessor: PT Indocitra Buana
- Founded: 1986; 40 years ago (As PT Indocitra Buana); 2001; 25 years ago (As PT Nissan Motor Indonesia)
- Headquarters: Jakarta, Indonesia
- Area served: Indonesia
- Key people: Isao Sekiguchi (president director)
- Products: Automobiles
- Production output: ▼4,696 vehicles (2019); ▼15,308 vehicles (2018); ▼20,451 vehicles (2017)
- Brands: Nissan; Datsun (2014–2020); Infiniti (2011–2016)
- Parent: Indomobil Group; Nissan Motor Company
- Website: nissan.co.id

PT Nissan Motor Indonesia (also called NMI) is a subsidiary of Nissan Motor Company in Indonesia. The company was founded in 2001 and headquartered in Jakarta. Previously, Nissan vehicles were distributed by PT Indocitra Buana (established 1986), a joint venture company between Indomobil Group and Bimantara Citra. Together with PT Nissan Motor Distributor Indonesia, these companies acts as both national sales/distribution company and formerly a manufacturing company.

In 2010, Nissan Motor Indonesia was planned to selling Infiniti vehicles to Indonesia. It was officaly started on 16 March 2011. It was closed in May 2018 due to poor sales.

On 8 May 2014, the plant 2 was opened. Which increased its total annual production capacity from 60,000 units to 80,000 units. Total 33 billion Yen (Rp 3,7 trillion) was be invested to the second plant. The second factory is dedicated to assembly to the Datsun Go vehicle.

In January 2019, NMI closed their Plant 1 in Purwakarta, effectively ending the production of Grand Livina, X-Trail, Serena and Juke. The plant would be converted to an engine manufacturing plant for Mitsubishi. Meanwhile, Datsun models stay on production in their Plant 2 until its closure in January 2020. On 18 March 2020, President of NMI Isao Sekiguchi officially announced the end of Nissan vehicle manufacturing in Indonesia. Manufacturing previously based in Indonesia was moved to Thailand.

== Models ==
=== Current models ===
==== Imported ====
- Nissan Fairlady Z (planned)
- Nissan Navara (2015–2018, 2026–present) (Note: This vehicle was discontinued in 2018, but it was relaunched in 2026.)
- Nissan Patrol (2027, planned)
- Nissan Serena (2019–present)
- Nissan Terra (2018–2020, 2023–present) (Note: This vehicle was discontinued in 2021, but it was relaunched in 2022)
- Nissan X-Trail (2019–present)

=== Former models ===
==== Manufactured locally ====
Nissan

- Nissan Evalia
- Nissan Juke
- Nissan Livina
- Nissan Livina X-Gear
- Nissan March
- Nissan Serena
- Nissan Terrano
- Nissan X-Trail

Datsun

- Datsun Cross
- Datsun Go Panca
- Datsun Go+ Panca

==== Imported ====
Nissan

- Nissan 350Z
- Nissan Almera (fleet only)
- Nissan Cefiro
- Nissan Elgrand
- Nissan GT-R
- Nissan Kicks
- Nissan Latio
- Nissan Latio sedan (fleet only)
- Nissan Leaf
- Nissan Magnite
- Nissan March
- Nissan Pathfinder
- Nissan Patrol
- Nissan Sentra
- Nissan Silvia
- Nissan Teana

Infiniti

- Infiniti FX
- Infiniti G37 Coupe
- Infiniti I30
- Infiniti M37
- Infiniti Q50
- Infiniti QX70
- Infiniti QX80

== Exports ==
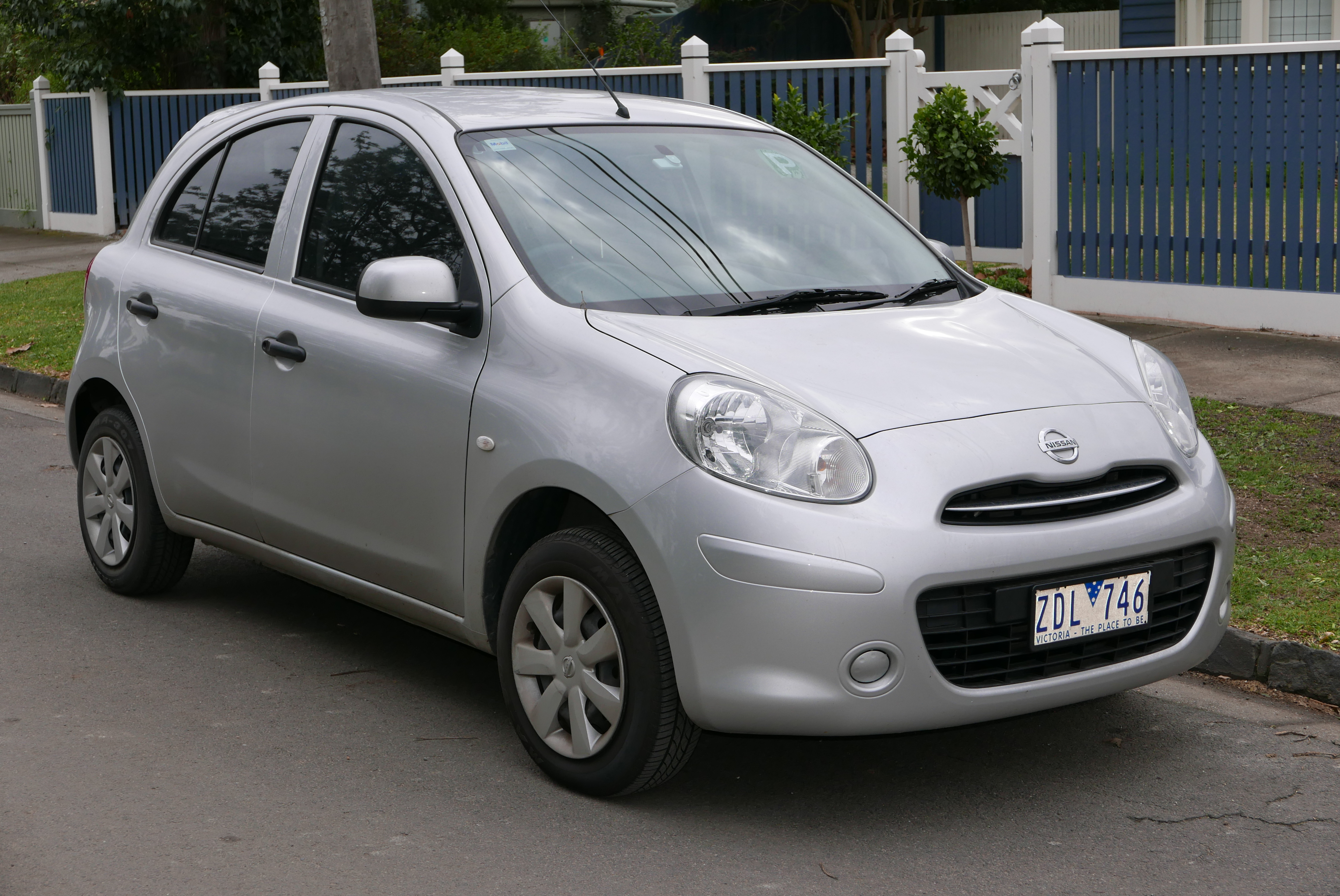
The Nissan Micra in Australia was imported from Indonesia.

Between 2009 and 2014, NMI exported the locally assembled X-Trail to Malaysia and Thailand. NMI supplied the March/Micra to Australia between 2010 and 2013. From 2014 to 2017, the Juke and Livina X-Gear was exported to Thailand. The plant also exported the Grand Livina and Livina X-Gear by knock-down kits to Malaysia later to be assembled by Tan Chong Motor Assemblies between 2007 and 2019.

== Annual sales ==
Year	Sales
2000	1,859
2001	3,983
2002	4,565
2003	7,925
2004	11,906
2005	10,041
2006	3,707
2007	18,920
2008	31,708
2009	21,305
2010	36,634
2011	55,783
2012	66,638
2013	60,372
2014	33,017
2015	24,953
2016	13,054
2017	13,534
2018	6,885
2019	12,302
2020	10,849
2021	3,177
2022	2,413
2023	1,639

Excluding Datsun and Infiniti brands
