= Magnite =

Magnite may refer to:

- Nissan Magnite, a subcompact crossover SUV model
- Magnite Inc, an American online advertising technology firm formerly known as Rubicon Project

== See also ==
- Magnetite, a rock mineral
