= Renault Triber =

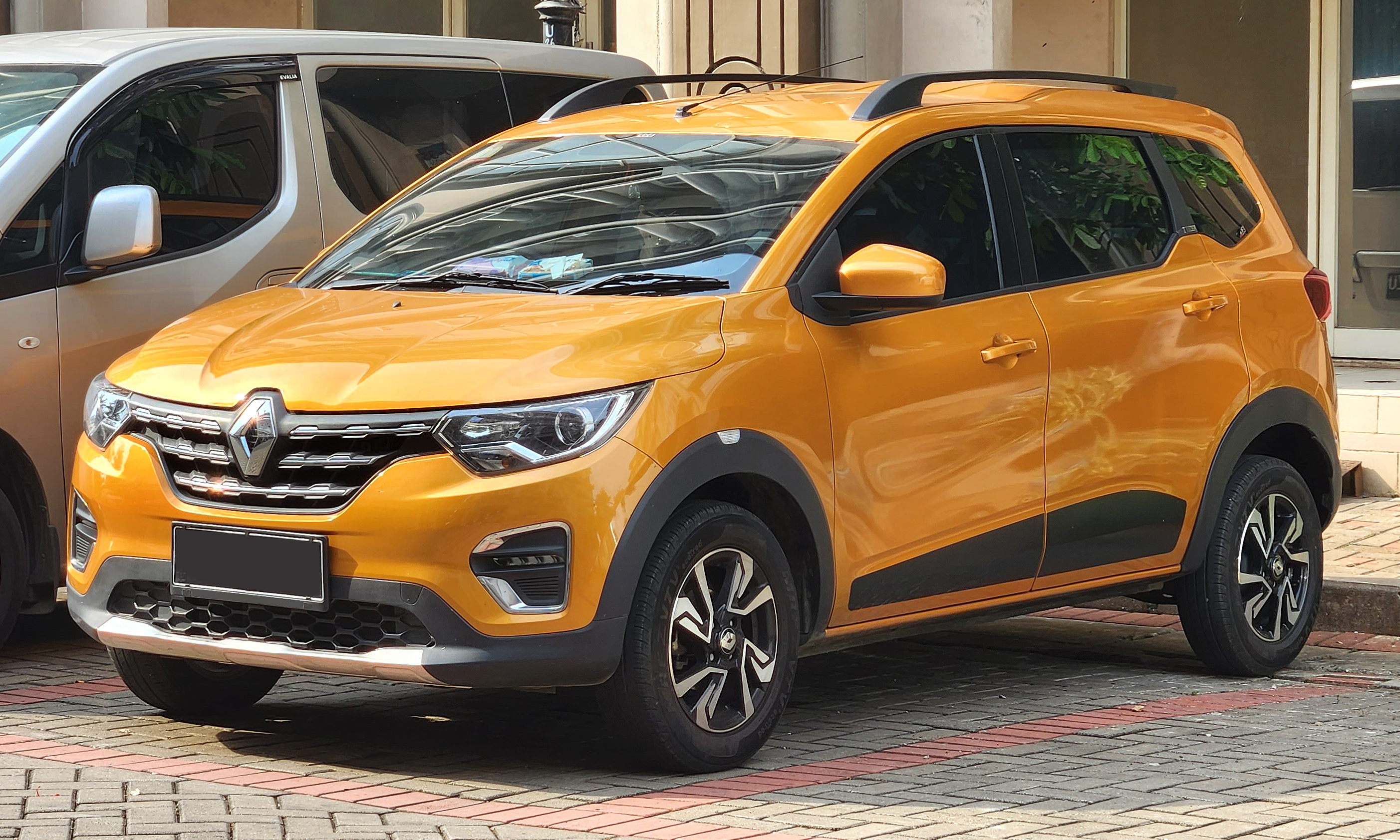
- Renault Triber (pre-facelift)

Overview
- Manufacturer: Renault
- Model code: T15 (Nissan)
- Also called: Nissan Gravite (India)
- Production: 2019–present (Renault); 2026–present (Nissan)
- Assembly: India: Chennai (Renault Nissan India)
- Designer: Under the lead of Laurens van den Acker

Body and chassis
- Class: Mini MPV
- Body style: 5-door wagon
- Layout: Front-engine, front-wheel-drive
- Platform: Renault–Nissan CMF-A+
- Related: Renault Kiger; Nissan Magnite; Renault Kwid

Powertrain
- Engine: Petrol: 999 cc B4D I3; 999 cc HRA0DET turbo I3
- Power output: 53 kW (71 hp; 72 PS) for NA and 74 kW (99 hp; 101 PS) for Turbo
- Transmission: 5-speed manual; 5-speed Easy-R automated manual

Dimensions
- Wheelbase: 2,636 mm (103.8 in)
- Length: 3,990 mm (157.1 in); 3,985 mm (156.9 in) (Facelift); 3,987 mm (157.0 in) (Nissan Gravite)
- Width: 1,739 mm (68.5 in)
- Height: 1,643 mm (64.7 in)
- Kerb weight: 947 kg (2,088 lb)

The Renault Triber is a mini MPV with three-row seating, primarily produced for the Indian market by the French car manufacturer Renault through its Indian subsidiary Renault India. It was introduced in India on 19 June 2019 and went on sale in August 2019.

== Overview ==
=== Development ===
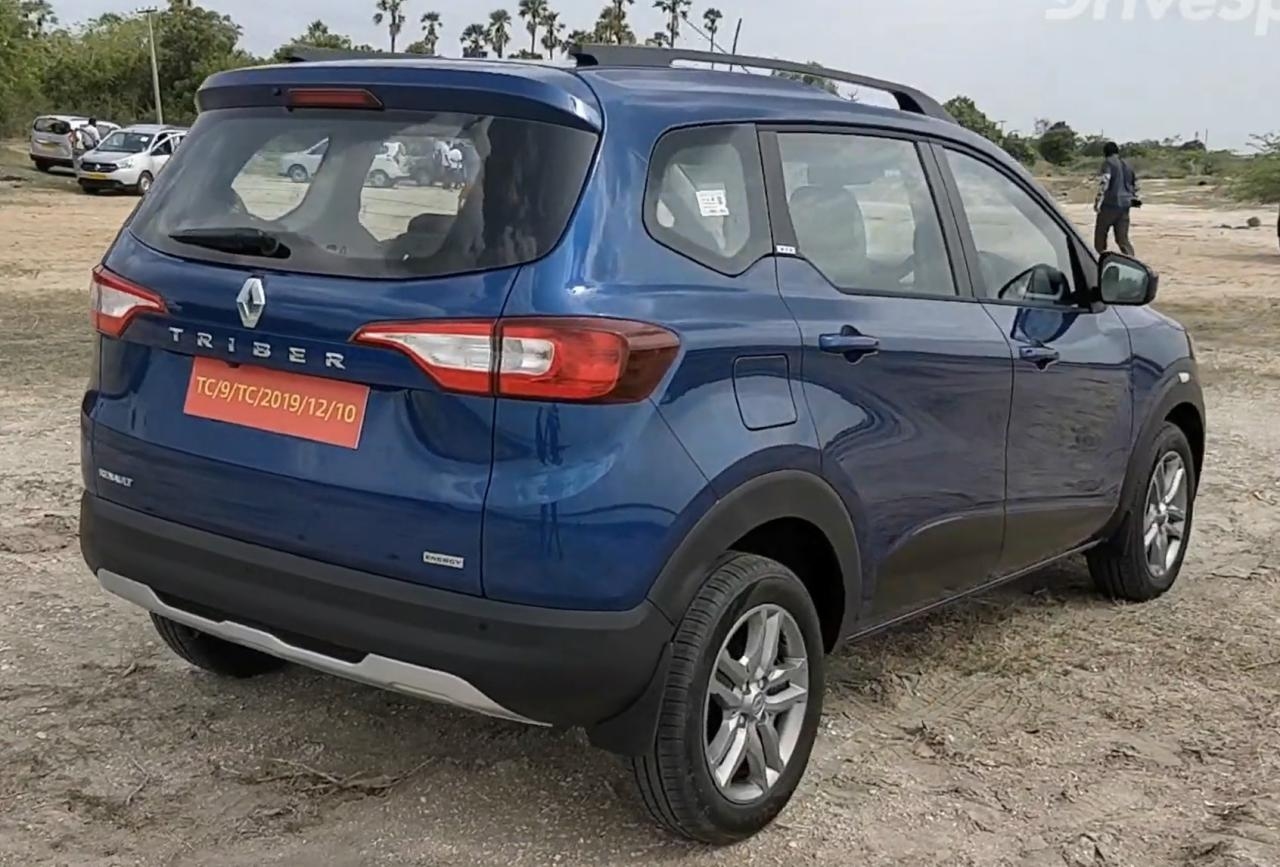
Rear view

Developed under the body code "RBC", the Triber is built on top of the CMF-A platform like the Kwid. Despite that, the car is built with over 90% dedicated parts not shared with other Renault and Nissan vehicles since it is a larger and wider car in the CMF-A family.

Laurens van den Acker, Corporate Design of Groupe Renault said the interior of the car is a "miracle" and refers to it as "a bit of a Leonardo da Vinci" as it offers three-row seating in a sub-four metre length. This was achieved by making the bonnet and engine bay as short as possible, making it not possible to fit a diesel engine or any larger petrol engine to the car. The car's width is spanning at 1,739 mm (68.5 in) to maximize cabin space, especially in the second row where three people had to fit comfortably. The stretched wheelbase and the reduced overhang also contributed to the spacious cabin space which Van den Acker claimed is around 3 metres long. The second row seats comes with a reclining and split folding function. There is a dedicated AC vent for the third row of seats, armrests and charging sockets. The third row can be removed altogether to liberate up to 625 L (38,140 cu in) of boot space.

One of the difficult parts of the development of the Triber is maximizing the headroom for the third-row passengers, as the space is usually occupied by the rear hatch door hinge mechanism. The rear part of the roof is raised, allowing more headroom and a roof-mounted air conditioner blowers. The roof bump is masked by the roof rail, making it less visible.

The car is also designed with a faux-crossover look, which Van den Acker said "gives the car a much tougher stand, and brings it in an SUV sphere". It would also make the car appeal to consumers in India who prefers a high driving position and high ground clearance.

=== Triber Express ===
In 2022, Renault introduced the Triber Express to the South African market. It is a light commercial vehicle variant that does not have rear seats and has a steel cargo cage that can be accessed through either the tailgate or the rear doors. The model has a claimed load capacity of 1,500 L (330 imp gal; 400 US gal) with a payload capacity of 542 kg (1,195 lb).

=== 2025 facelift ===
The facelifted Triber was launched on 23 July 2025.

The front gains new LED headlights with integrated DRLs, a bolder gloss-black grille, revised bumper with larger air dam and repositioned fog lamps, plus Renault's new 2D diamond logo. Sides include 15-inch flex wheels and blacked-out handles, while the rear features slimmer smoked LED tail lamps, new 'TRIBER' lettering, and reprofiled bumper.

Cabin upgrades bring a lighter grey-beige dashboard, higher-mounted 8-inch touchscreen with wireless Android Auto/Apple CarPlay, 7-inch digital driver's display, cruise control, rain-sensing wipers, and auto headlamps. Higher variants add a 360-degree camera and driver armrest, enhancing usability without major layout changes.

On September 28 2026, Renault India expanded the Triber lineup by launching a 1.0 liter turbocharged petrol variant delivering 100 hp and 180 Nm of torque, with prices starting at Rs.7.84 lakh (ex-showroom).

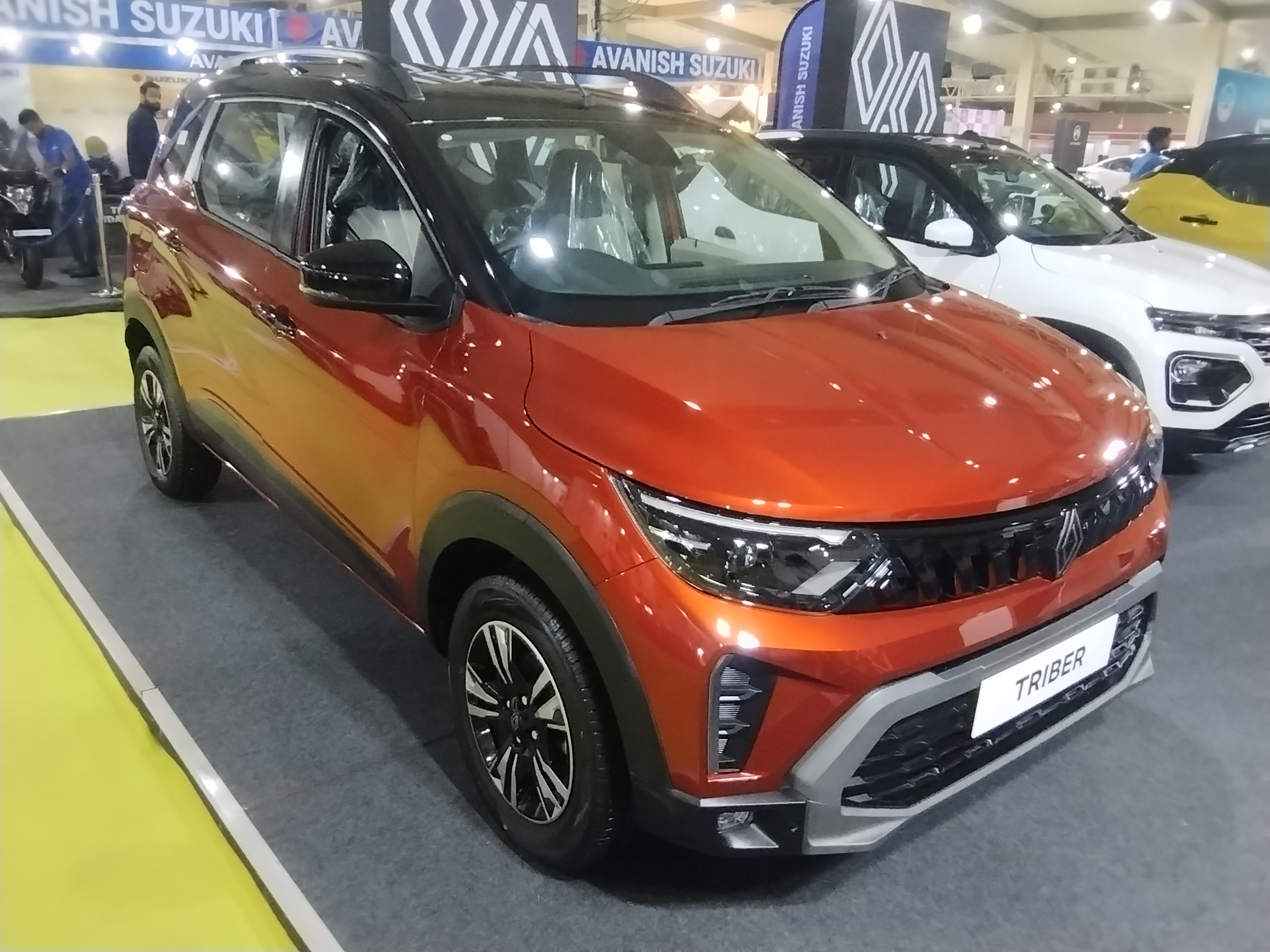
2025 facelift

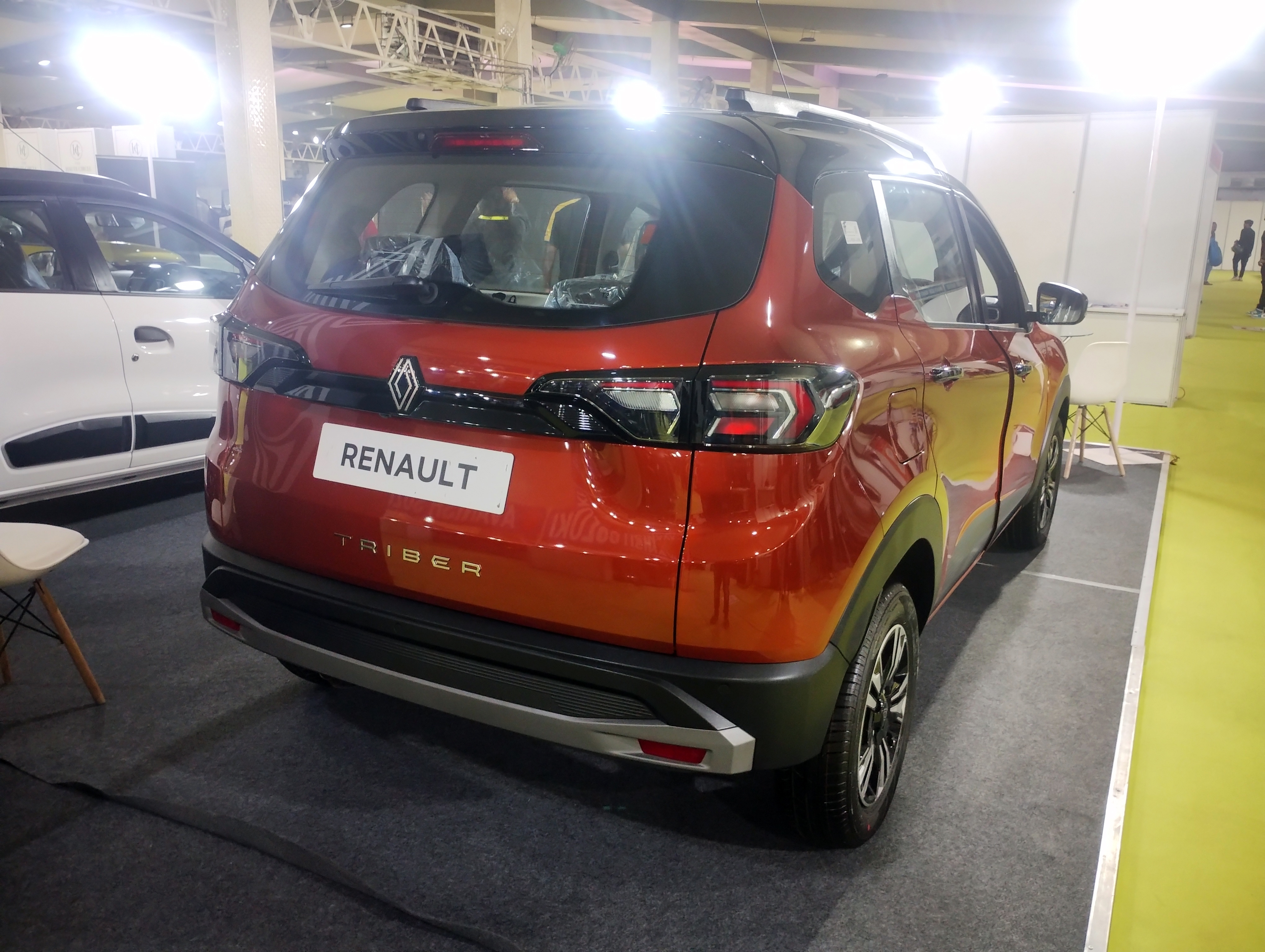
Rear view

== Nissan Gravite (T15) ==
The Nissan Gravite is a rebadged variant of the Triber for the Indian market. It was introduced in India on 17 February 2026 and went on sale in March 2026.

== Powertrain ==
The Triber is powered by an upgraded version of the Kwid's 999 cc BR10 three-cylinder petrol engine producing 53 kW (71 hp; 72 PS) at 6,250 rpm and 96 N⋅m (71 lb⋅ft) of torque at 3,500 rpm. The transmission options for the Triber are a 5-speed manual and a 5-speed automated manual gearbox.

A CNG variant is expected to be introduced by December 2024 according to a company official.

== Export markets ==
The Triber is exported to nearby right-hand drive emerging markets such as Indonesia and South Africa. It was introduced in Indonesia on 12 July 2019 and displayed at the 27th Gaikindo Indonesia International Auto Show from 18 to 28 July 2019. Renault received 1,033 bookings for the Triber at the show. The Triber started to be delivered to customers in March 2020. The RXZ trim of Triber in Indonesia has 15-inch dual-tone alloy wheels unseen in other markets. The South African introduction was also followed later in February 2020.

The Triber was went on sale in the Brunei market in late July 2022, marking the return of the Renault brand in the Brunei market after 9 years. It is offered in RXZ variant.

== Safety ==
=== India ===
The Indian-manufactured Triber was tested in its most basic safety specification for India (double frontal airbags, no ISOFIX) by Global NCAP 1.0 (similar to Latin NCAP 2013) in 2021, and scored four stars for adult occupant protection and three stars for child occupant protection. The vehicle's passenger compartment became unstable during the frontal crash test, but footwell intrusion and rupture was insignificant. The Q1.5 dummy which was installed rearward-facing scored full points in the dynamic test, but the Q3 dummy was installed forward-facing and its head crossed excursion limits, showing poor protection. The recommended child restraints for the test were Britax BabySafe Group 0+ and Britax Duo Plus Group I for the 1.5 year-old and the 3 year-old respectively. Both restraints were installed using a three-point seatbelt, because the Triber does not offer ISOFIX anchorages in its basic safety specification.

Global NCAP 1.0 test results (India) Renault Triber – 2 Airbags (2021, similar to Latin NCAP 2013)
Test	Score	Stars
Adult occupant protection	11.62/17.00	4 /5 stars
Child occupant protection	27.00/49.00	3 /5 stars

The Triber for the Indian market is available with double frontal airbags as standard and can be equipped with optional side torso airbags. ESC is not available on the Triber. The Triber does not offer three-point seatbelts and head restraints in all seating positions. ISOFIX anchorages are only available on higher variants.

=== South Africa ===
The South African version of the Triber received 2 stars for adults and 2 stars for toddlers from Global NCAP 2.0 in 2024 (similar to Latin NCAP 2016).

Global NCAP 2.0 test results (South Africa) Renault Triber – 2 Airbags (2024, similar to Latin NCAP 2016)
Test	Score	Stars
Adult occupant protection	22.29/34.00	2 /5 stars
Child occupant protection	19.99/49.00	2 /5 stars

The 2025 facelifted Triber is equipped with 6 airbags as standard across all variants, 21 safety features on all base variants, and 24 safety features on the top trim. It is also a part of the Human First program.

== Sales ==
Year	India
2019	24,142
2020	38,906
2021	32,766
2022	31,678
2023	32,664
2024	22,446
