= Renault Kiger =

Subcompact crossover SUV

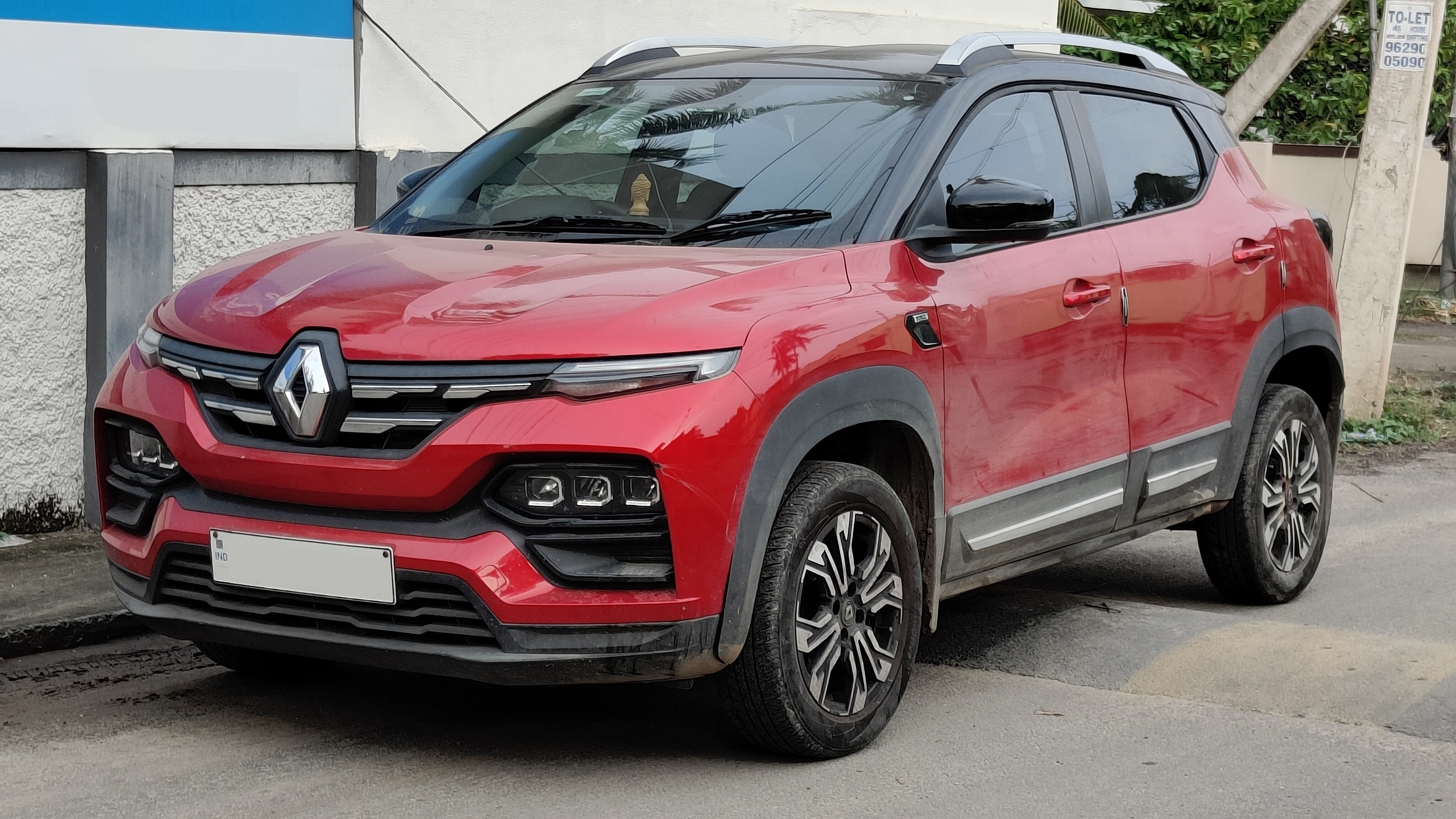
- 2022 Renault Kiger RxZ (India)

Overview
- Manufacturer: Renault
- Production: 2021–present
- Assembly: India: Chennai (Renault Nissan India)
- Designer: Serge Cosenza

Body and chassis
- Class: Subcompact crossover SUV
- Body style: 5-door SUV
- Layout: Front-engine, front-wheel-drive
- Platform: Renault–Nissan CMF-A+
- Related: Nissan Magnite; Nissan Gravite; Renault Triber; Renault Kwid

Powertrain
- Engine: Petrol: 999 cc B4D I3; 999 cc HRA0 turbo I3
- Transmission: 5-speed manual; 5-speed Easy-R automated manual; CVT (turbo)

Dimensions
- Wheelbase: 2,500 mm (98.4 in)
- Length: 3,991 mm (157.1 in)
- Width: 1,750 mm (68.9 in)
- Height: 1,600 mm (63.0 in)
- Kerb weight: 1,012 kg (2,231 lb)

The Renault Kiger is a Subcompact crossover SUV manufactured and marketed by Renault. It was revealed in January 2021 and has been marketed since March 2021. Designed and manufactured in India, it is positioned under the Duster to occupy the sub-4 metre crossover SUV segment in India.

== Overview ==
Developed under the project code HBC, the design of the Kiger was previewed in its concept "showcar" version on 18 November 2020. The production version was released on 28 January 2021 in New Delhi. Kiger is the work of the French and Indian design divisions. The Kiger is built on the Renault-Nissan CMF-A+ platform shared with the closely related Triber MPV and the Nissan Magnite. The crossover receives a sculpted hood, a semi-floating roof with an integrated gallery that extends to the windshield, as well as two central exhaust outlets.

In India, the vehicle is available with the 1.0-liter B4D three-cylinder naturally aspirated petrol engine as standard, capable of 72 PS (71 hp; 53 kW) and 96 N⋅m (9.79 kg⋅m; 70.8 lb⋅ft) paired with a 5-speed manual or an Easy-R automated manual transmission. Upper trims gets the 1.0-liter HRA0 turbocharged petrol engine produces 100 PS (99 hp; 74 kW) and 152–160 N⋅m (15.5–16.3 kg⋅m; 112–118 lb⋅ft) of torque, mated with a five-speed manual transmission or an optional CVT.

At launch, Renault claimed the vehicle has the best-in-class cargo capacity with a volume of 405 litres, expandable to 879 litres after folding the rear seats.

The Kiger was introduced in Indonesia in August 2021. It is offered in a single RXZ trim with a 1.0-litre turbocharged engine option.

The Kiger was introduced in Brunei in late July 2022, marking the return of the Renault brand in the Brunei market after 9 years. It is offered in the RXZ variant with a 1.0-litre turbocharged engine option. The RXT variant (1.0 L naturally aspirated engine) was added in late October 2023.

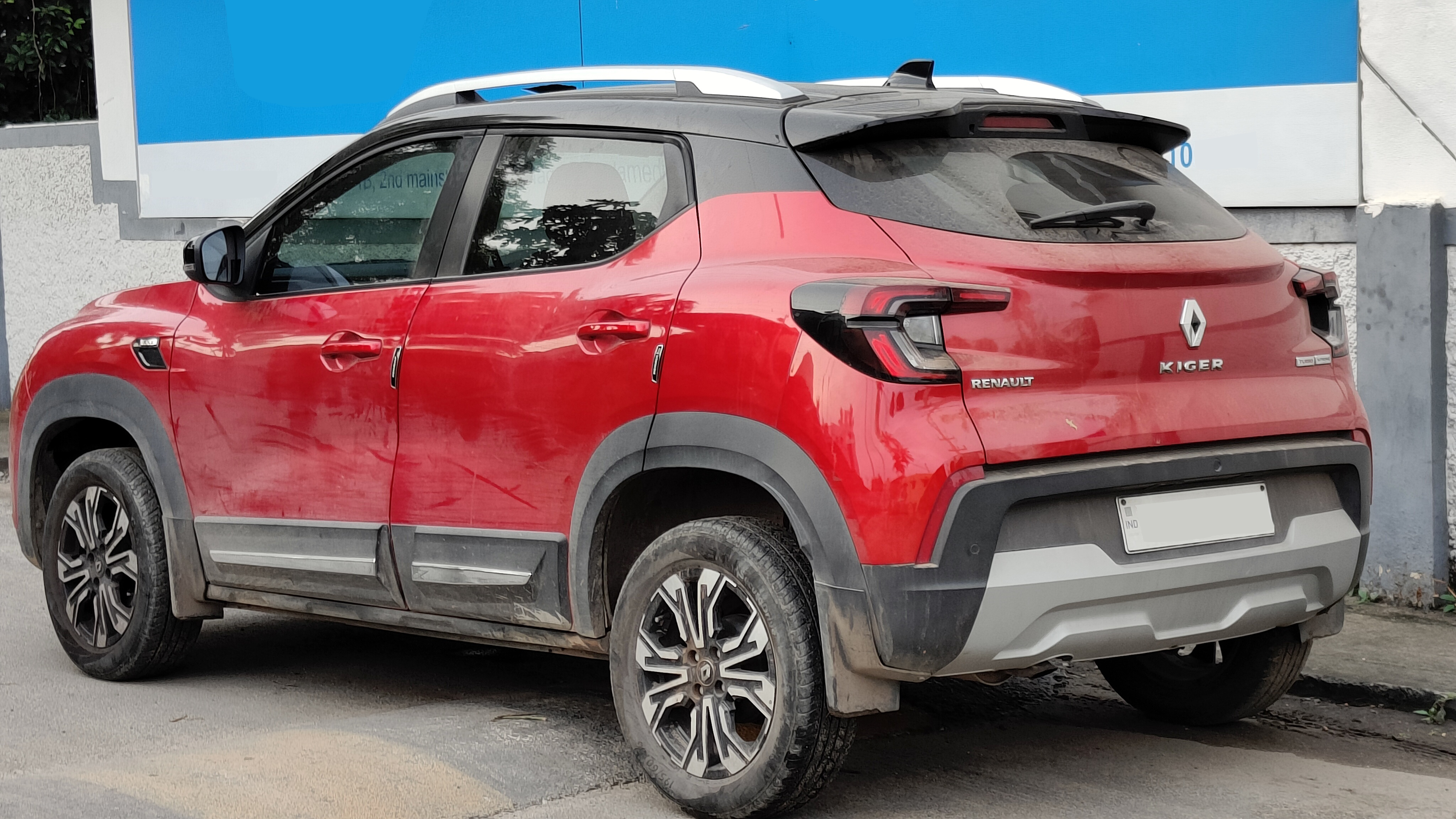
Rear view

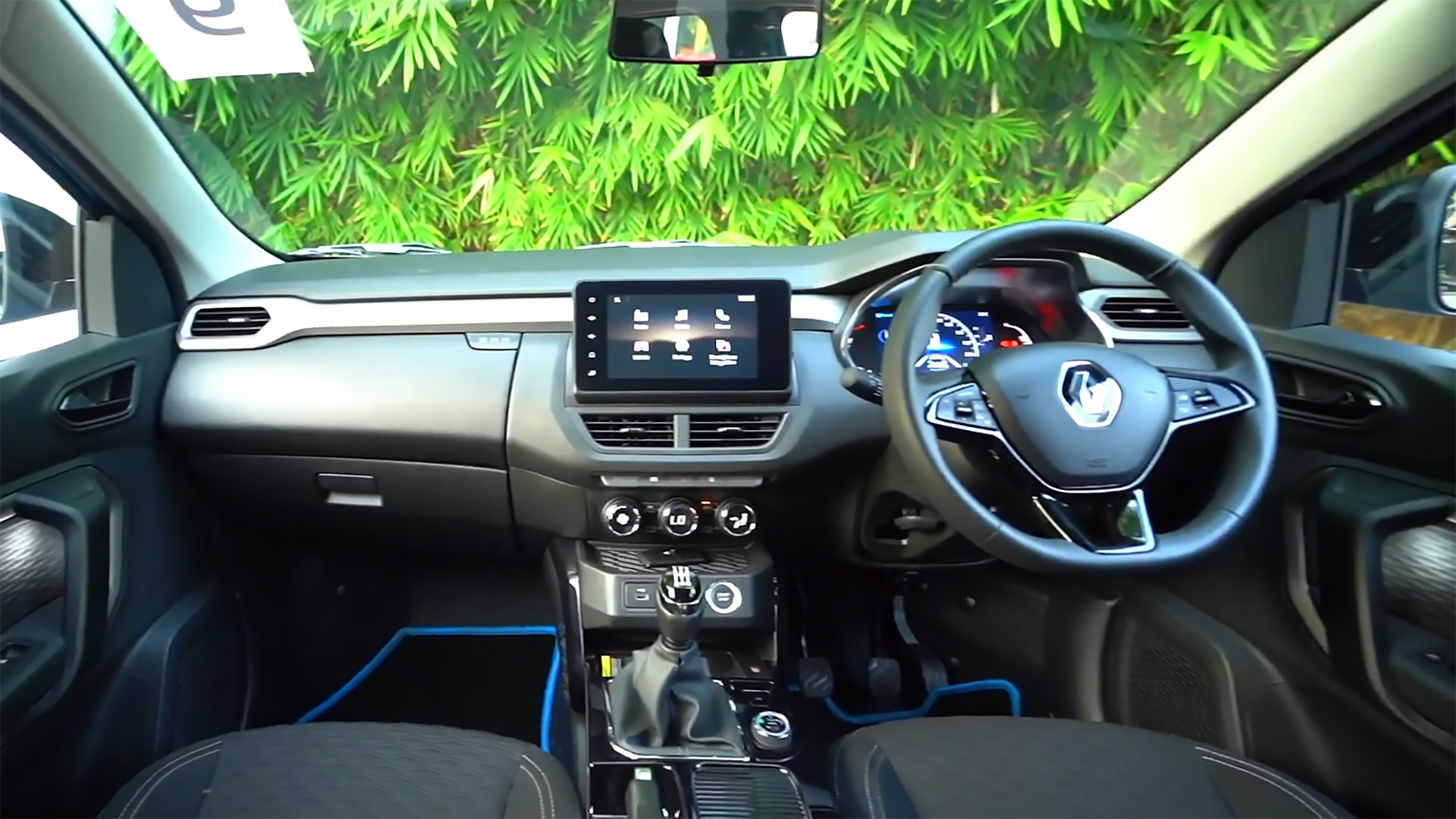
Interior

=== 2025 Facelift ===
The facelifted Kiger was unveiled on 24 August 2025. The exterior changes includes redesigned front and rear bumpers, the split headlights incorporates additional fog lights, the new Renault logo on the front fascia, new graphic designs on the C-pillar, new alloy wheel designs and new exterior colours. Compared to the pre-facelift model, the interior received minimal changes, however, the dashboard received new colour combinations, updated upholstery choices, the steering wheel featured the new Renault logo, and improvised interior features across the line-up.

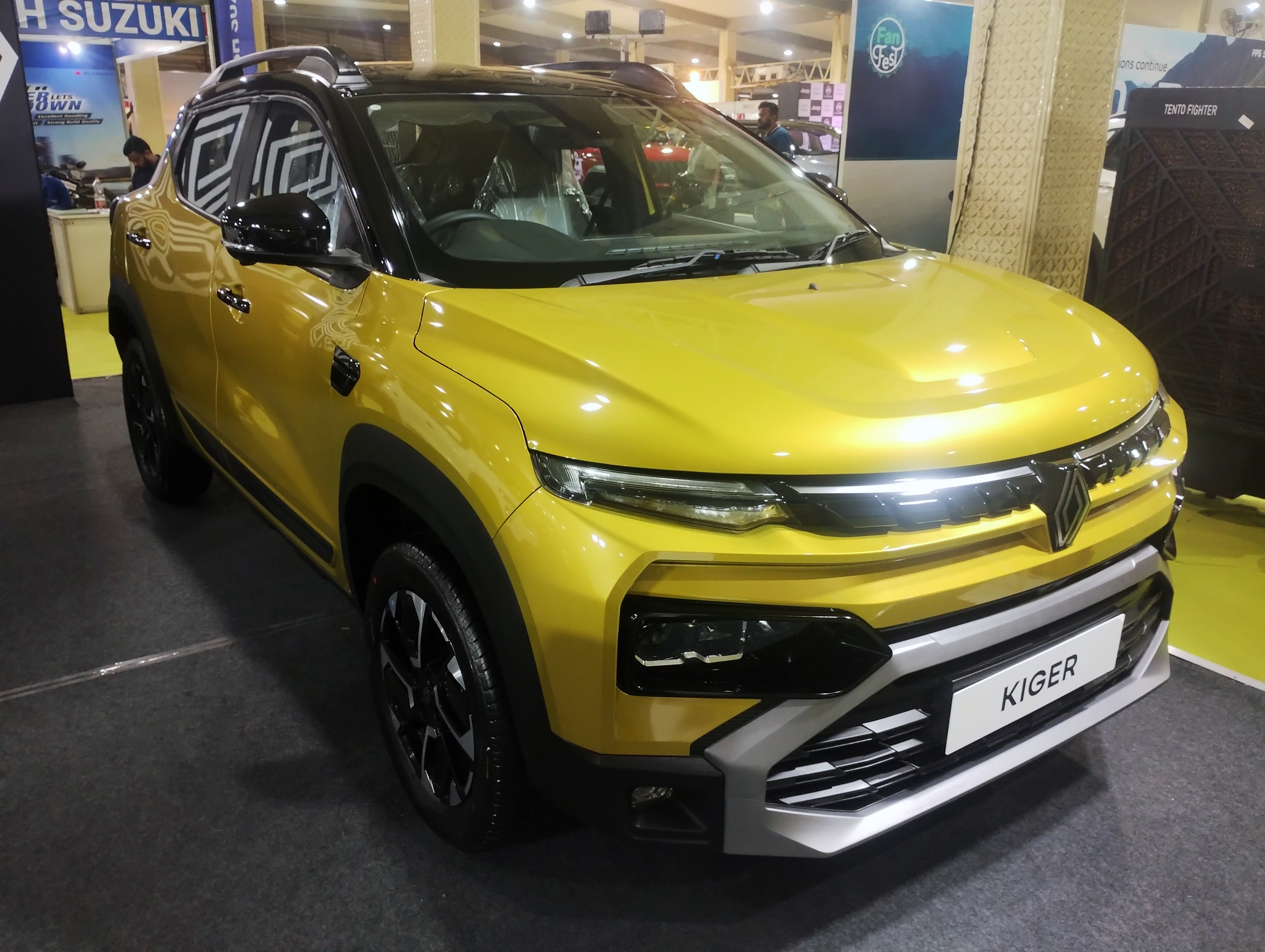
2025 Facelift

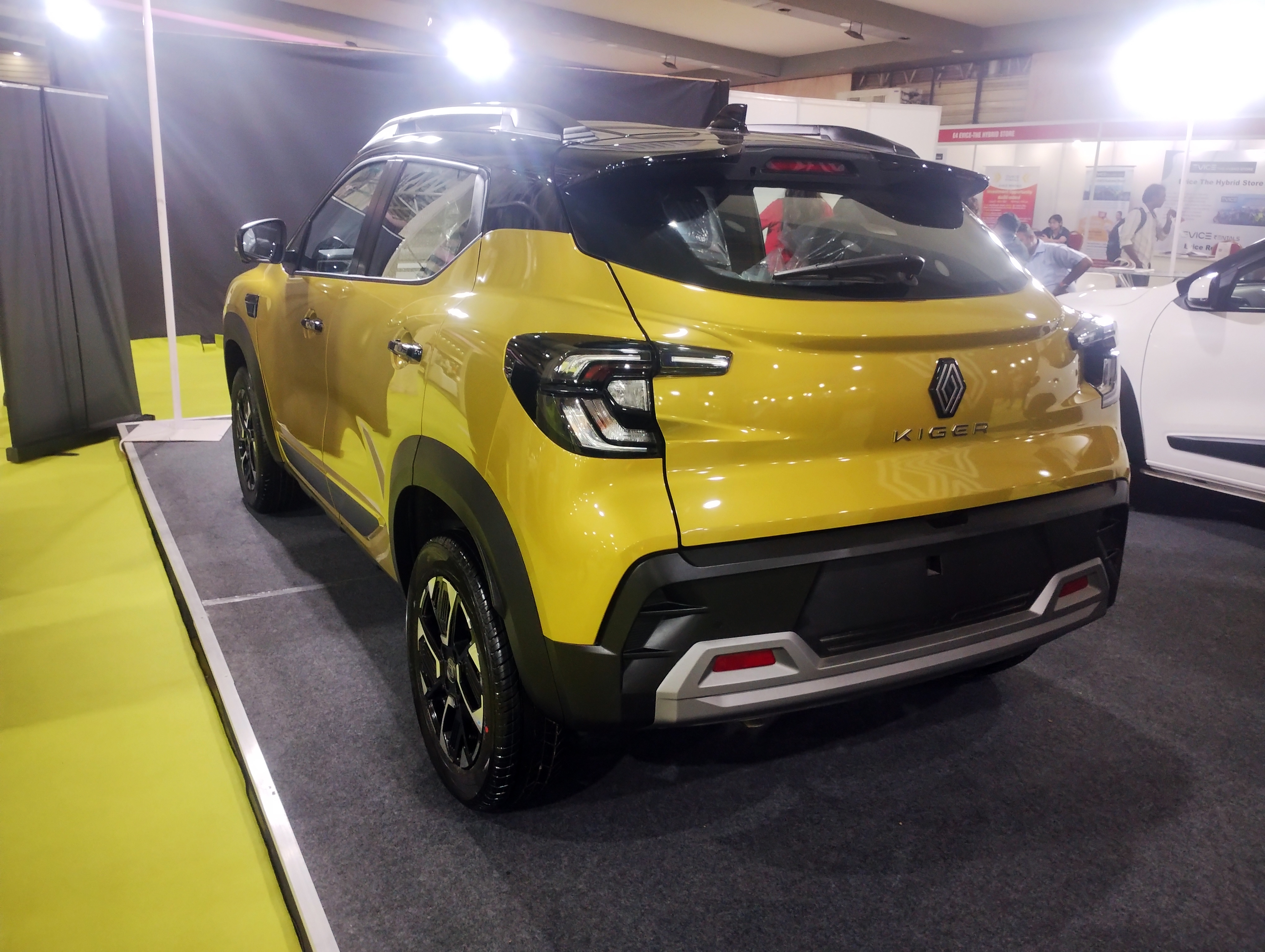
Rear view

== Safety ==
Global NCAP 1.0 test results (India) Renault Kiger – 2 Airbags (H1 2022, similar to Latin NCAP 2013)
Test	Score	Stars
Adult occupant protection	12.34/17.00	4 /5 stars
Child occupant protection	21.05/49.00	2 /5 stars

The Renault Kiger, manufactured and sold in India, was tested by Global NCAP 1.0 in H1 2022 (similar to Latin NCAP 2013) in its most basic safety specification of double frontal airbags and ISOFIX anchorages, and scored four stars for adult occupant protection and two stars for child occupant protection. The vehicle's passenger compartment became unstable during the frontal crash test, but like the Renault Triber tested earlier, footwell intrusion and rupture was insignificant.

During the test it was found that the Top Tether anchorages in the Kiger purchased for the test could not be used by consumers because they were completely sealed by the fabric lining the boot, and would require cutting of the fabric to be accessed. Hence Global NCAP decided that Renault would not be allowed to use the anchorages in the test and had to install both child seats using an adult seatbelt.

The Kiger for the Indian market is available with double frontal airbags as standard and can be equipped with optional side torso airbags. ESC is not available on the Kiger in India but is offered as an option in South Africa. The Kiger does not offer three-point seatbelts in all seating positions which can cause severe spinal and abdominal injuries to an adult occupant in a crash.

Global NCAP 2.5 test results (Africa) Renault Kiger – 2 Airbags (2026, similar to Latin NCAP 2019)
Test	Score	Stars
Adult occupant protection	21.60/34.00	2 /5 stars
Child occupant protection	16.80/49.00	1 /5 stars

Global NCAP 2.5 test results (Africa) Renault Kiger – 6 Airbags (2026, similar to Latin NCAP 2019)
Test	Score	Stars
Adult occupant protection	25.20/34.00	4 /5 stars
Child occupant protection	30.21/49.00	3 /5 stars
