= Datsun Go =

City car/mini MPV produced by Nissan

Datsun Go/Go+
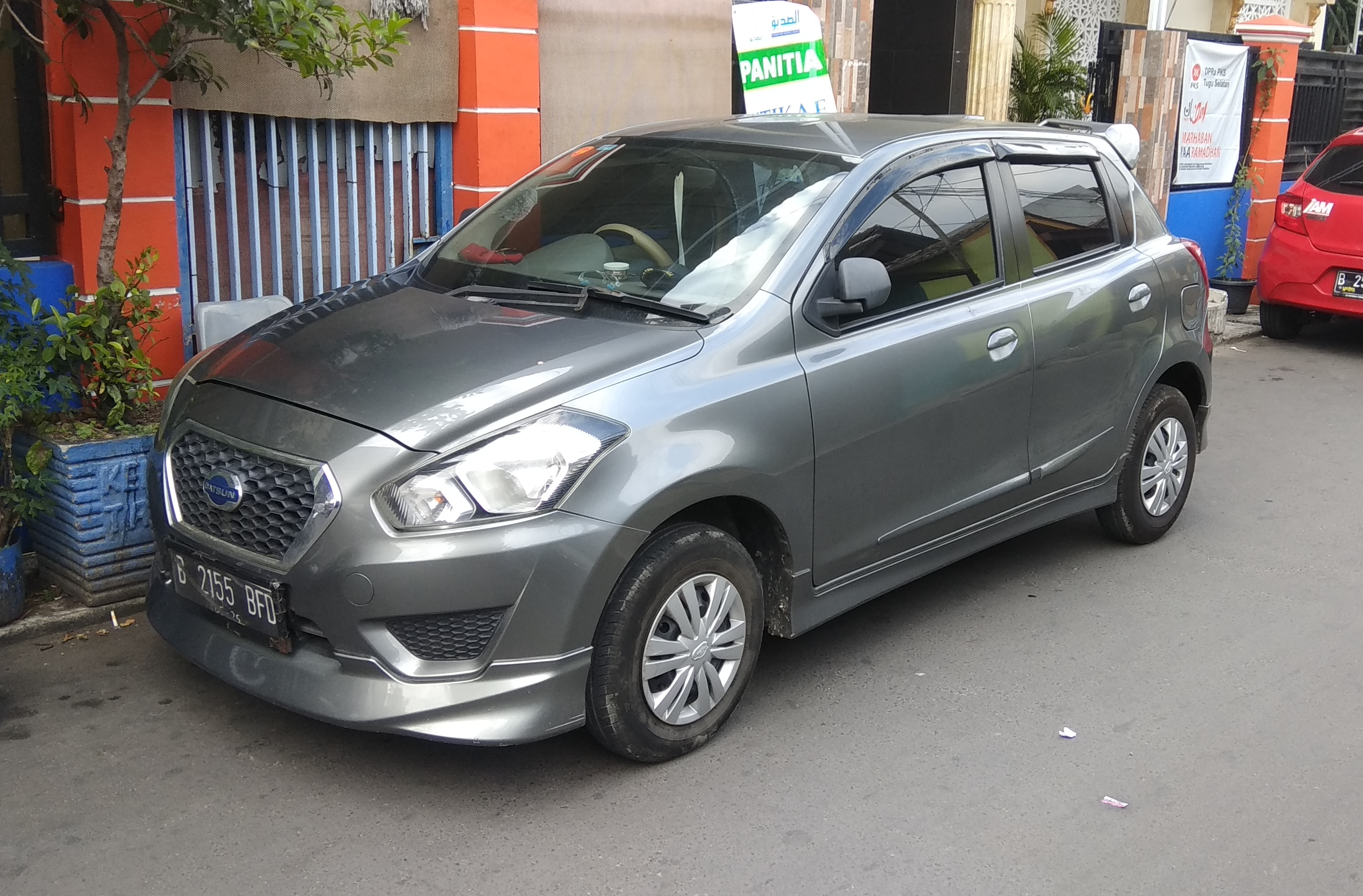
- 2015 Datsun Go Panca T Active (pre-facelift, Indonesia)

Overview
- Manufacturer: Datsun (Nissan)
- Model code: AD0
- Production: 2014–2022 (India); 2014–2020 (Indonesia)
- Assembly: India: Chennai (Renault Nissan India); Indonesia: Purwakarta (Nissan Motor Indonesia)
- Designer: Hiroshi Oda and Choi Jinwook (pre-facelift)

Body and chassis
- Class: City car (Go); Mini MPV (Go+/Cross)
- Body style: 5-door hatchback (Go); 5-door wagon (Go+/Cross)
- Layout: Front-engine, front-wheel-drive
- Platform: Nissan V platform
- Related: Nissan Micra/March (K13)

Powertrain
- Engine: Petrol: 1.2 L HR12DE I3
- Power output: 50–57 kW (67–76 hp; 68–77 PS)
- Transmission: 5-speed manual (2014–2020); CVT (2018–2020)

Dimensions
- Wheelbase: 2,450 mm (96.5 in)
- Length: 3,785 mm (149.0 in) (Go); 3,995 mm (157.3 in) (Go+/Cross)
- Width: 1,635 mm (64.4 in) (Go/Go+); 1,670 mm (65.7 in) (Cross)
- Height: 1,485 mm (58.5 in) (Go); 1,490 mm (58.7 in) (Go+); 1,560 mm (61.4 in) (Cross)
- Kerb weight: 785 kg (1,731 lb) (Go); 812 kg (1,790 lb) (Go+)

Chronology
- Successor: Nissan Magnite (Indonesia)

The Datsun Go/Go+ is a city car and mini MPV with "5+2" seating capacity that was produced by the Japanese automaker Nissan under the Datsun brand (which was revived in 2013) between 2014 and 2022. Named after the "Dat-Go", Datsun's first car launched in the early 20th century, the Go was available in developing markets such as India, South Africa and Indonesia. It is built on the same V platform as the K13 Nissan Micra/March, from which it has inherited much of its components. In 2018, Nissan introduced a crossover derivative called the Datsun Cross, which was previewed as the Datsun Go-cross Concept in 2015. The Cross was only available in Indonesia.

== Overview ==
The Go was unveiled globally in Delhi, India on 15 July 2013, and went on sale in India in early 2014. It was unveiled in Jakarta, Indonesia on 17 September 2013 and went on sale in mid-2014 under Indonesian government's Low Cost Green Car (LCGC) program.

The Go is powered by a 1.2-litre (1,198 cc) three-cylinder DOHC engine with electronic fuel injection, which is the same unit used in the Micra. It produces 67 hp (50 kW; 68 PS) and 104 N⋅m (77 lbf⋅ft) of torque.

The Indonesian-market Go series was officially succeeded by the Nissan Magnite crossover SUV in early 2021 after Nissan ceased production of the Go series in 2020.

The Go series stopped production globally in 2022 as the Datsun brand was discontinued for the second time.

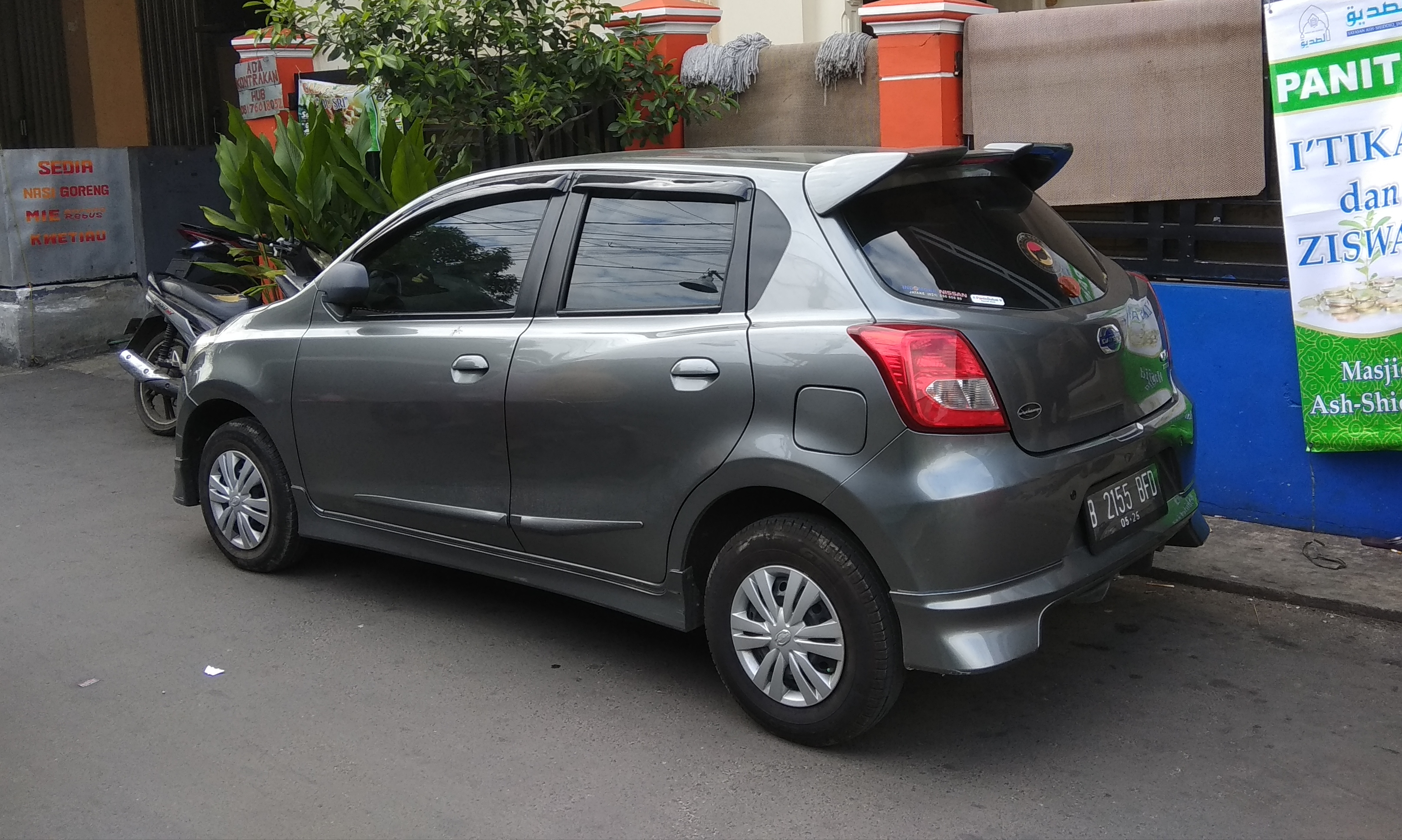
2015 Go Panca T Active (pre-facelift, Indonesia)

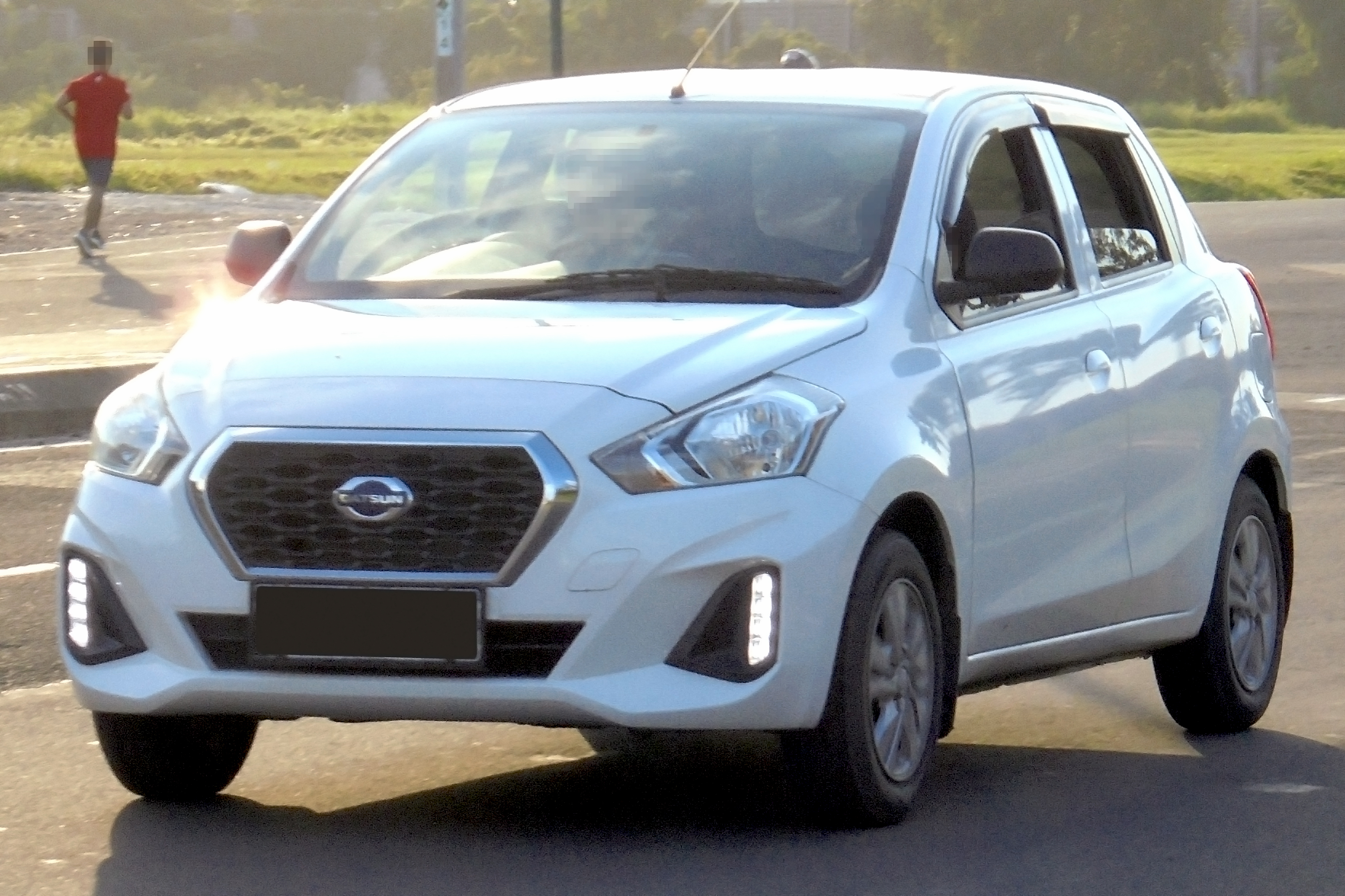
2019 Go Panca A (facelift, Indonesia)

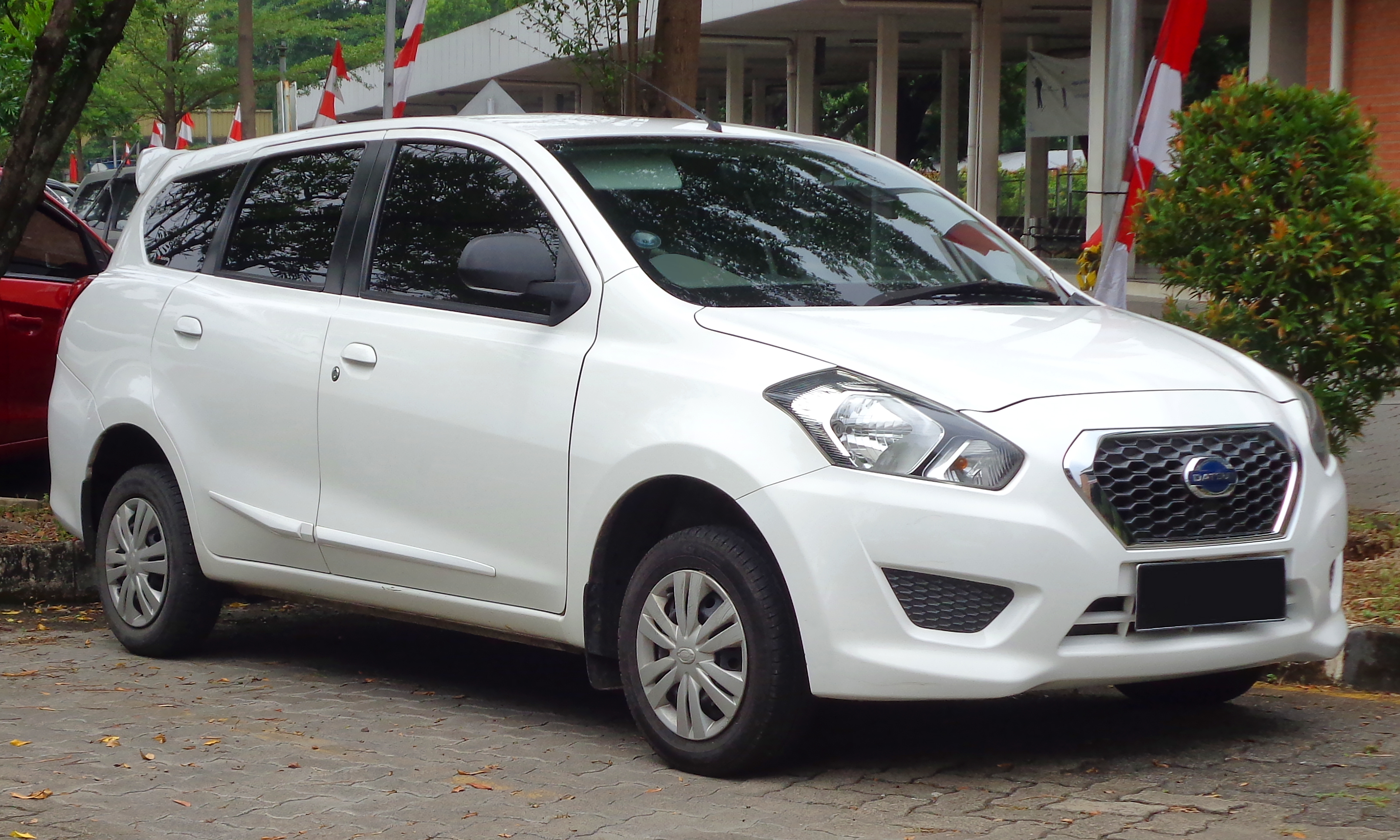
Go+ Panca T (pre-facelift, Indonesia)

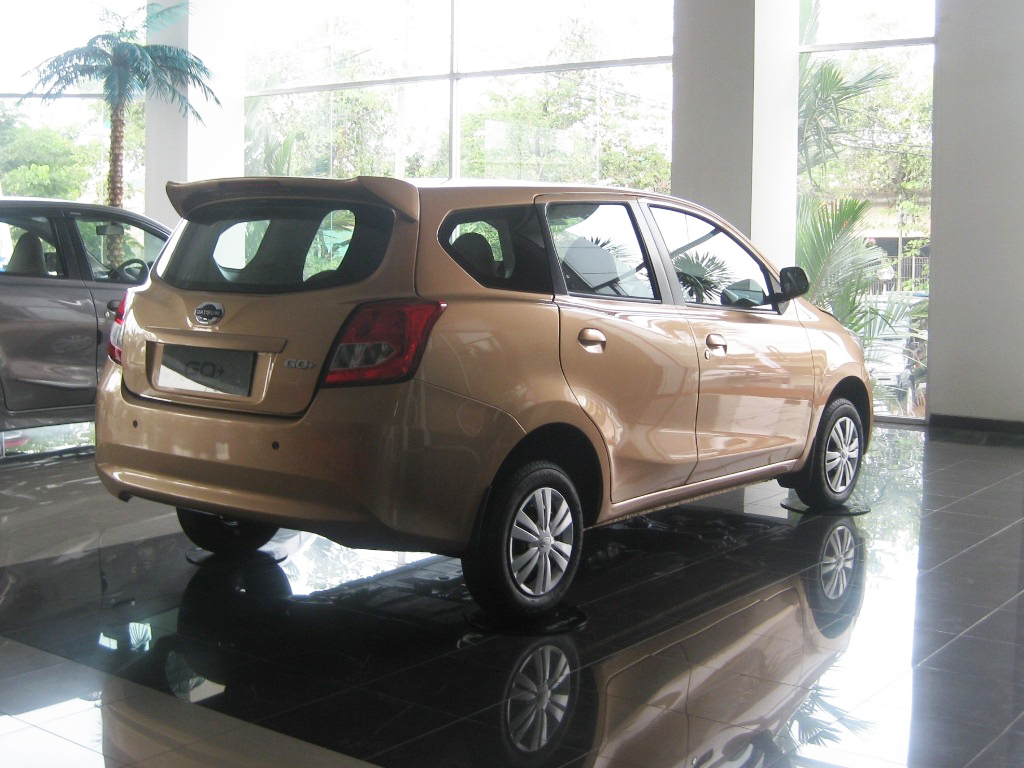
Go+ Panca T (pre-facelift, Indonesia)

== Markets ==
=== Indonesia ===
In Indonesia, the Go+ (marketed as Go+ Panca) was launched prior to the Go in May 2014 under the LCGC program. Initial trim levels were: D, A, A Option, T, and T Option. On 6 August 2014, the T Style trim (placed above T Option) was introduced.

In August 2014, the Go hatchback (marketed as Go Panca) was launched following the Go+. As of 2015, it was available in three trims: T, T Option and T Active. Both T Style and T Active trims were equipped with body kits as standard.

The facelifted Go and Go+ with automatic transmission (CVT) were launched in Indonesia on 7 May 2018. Both shared the same dashboard as the Cross (the Go+ variant with crossover-inspired styling) that was launched earlier. The CVT-equipped model was briefly not included in the Low Cost Green Car incentive programme due to lower local parts content, which incurs luxury tax for the variant.

On 2 August 2018, the Go Live special version equipped with aerokits was introduced. Later in 2019, it became equipped with Vehicle Dynamic Control (VDC).

=== India ===
The Go+ was launched in India in 2015. At that time, it was available in four trim levels. The company claims that the engine returns an ARAI-certified fuel economy of 20.62 km/L (58.2 mpg_{‑imp}; 48.5 mpg_{‑US}).

== Datsun Cross ==
The Datsun Cross is the crossover-inspired variant of the Go+. It was launched in Indonesia on 18 January 2018, after being previewed as a concept car called the Datsun Go-cross Concept at the 2015 Tokyo Motor Show in October, 2016 Auto Expo in India in February and 2016 Indonesia International Auto Show in August. The model is not included in the Low Cost Green Car incentive programme due to its price tag exceeding the required bracket.

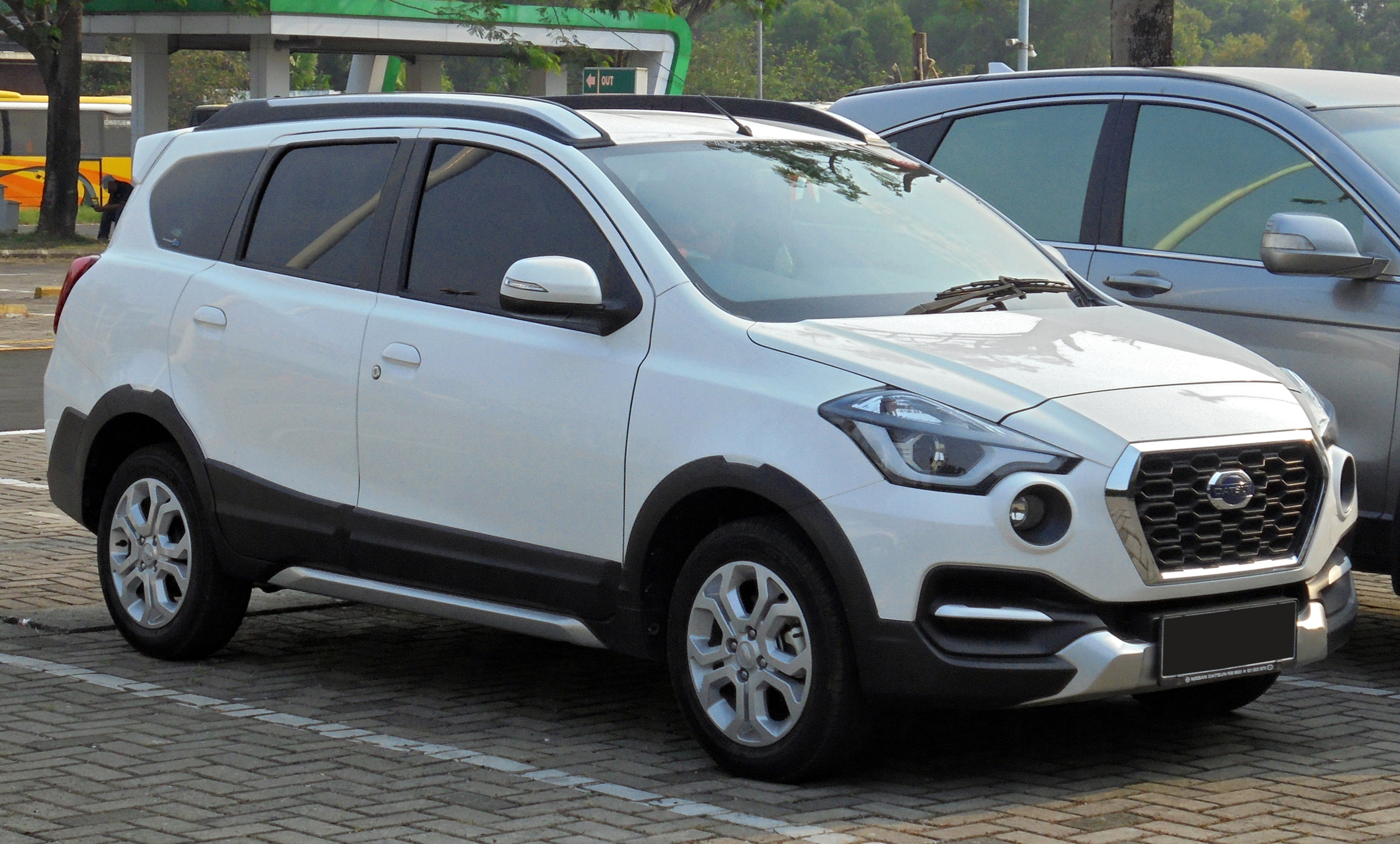
2018 Datsun Cross 1.2 CVT (Indonesia)

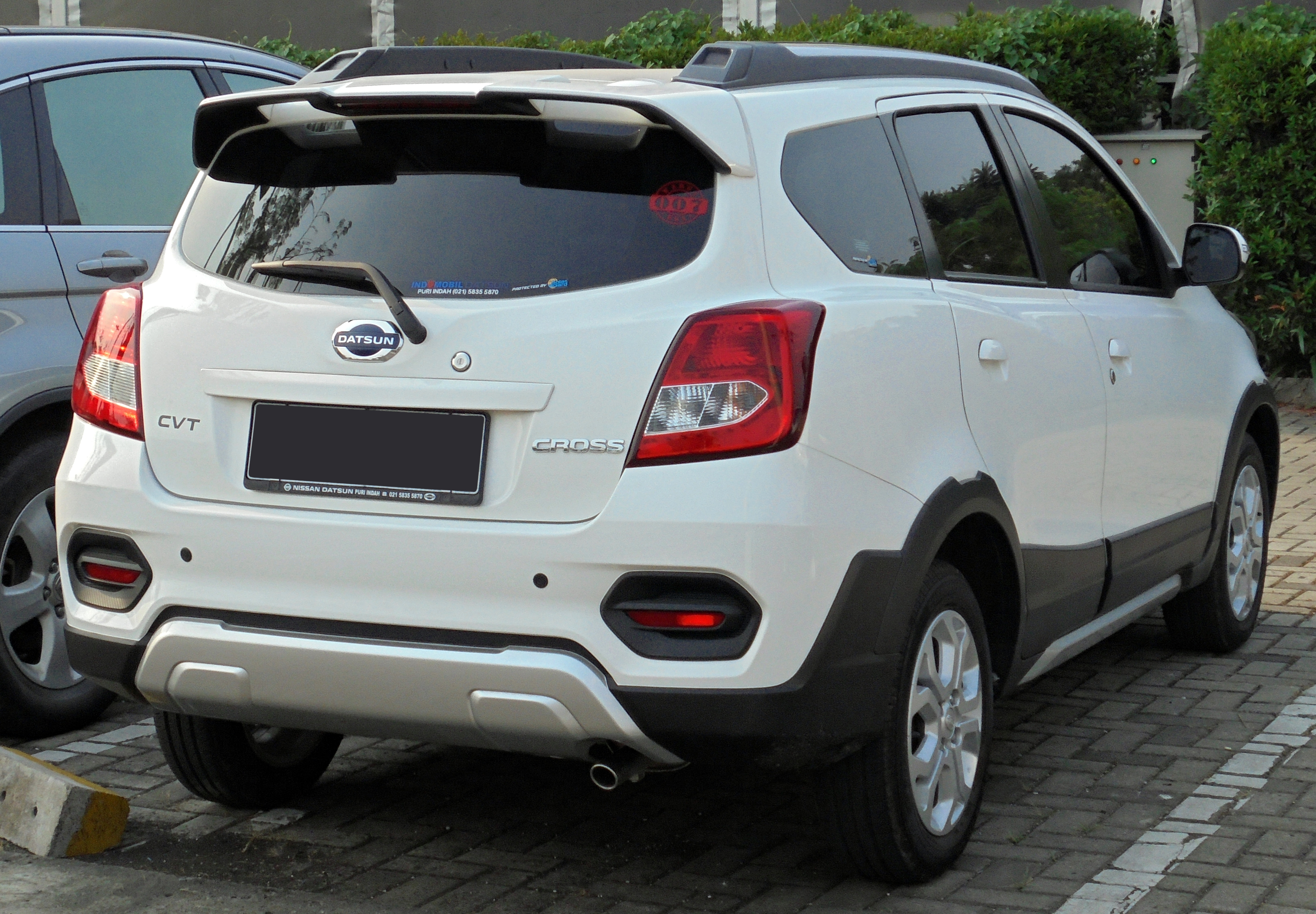
2018 Cross 1.2 CVT (Indonesia)

== Safety ==
Global NCAP 1.0 test results (India) Datsun Go – no airbags (2014, similar to Latin NCAP 2013)
| Test | Score | Stars |
|---|---|---|
| Adult occupant protection | 0.00/17.00 | 0 /5 stars |
| Child occupant protection | 15.06/49.00 | 2 /5 stars |

During a crash test in India, the Go with no airbags and no ABS received a zero-star rating from Global NCAP 1.0 (similar to Latin NCAP 2013) in 2014, prompting NCAP's chairman Max Mosley to request that the car be withdrawn from the market in a letter to Renault-Nissan CEO Carlos Ghosn as it was completely wrecked during the test.

The South African version of the Datsun Go+ with driver airbag and no ABS received 1 star for adult occupants and 2 stars for infants from Global NCAP 1.0 in 2017 (similar to Latin NCAP 2013).

Global NCAP 1.0 test results (South Africa) Datsun Go+ – 1 airbag (2017, similar to Latin NCAP 2013)
| Test | Score | Stars |
|---|---|---|
| Adult occupant protection | 4.00/17.00 | 1 /5 stars |
| Child occupant protection | 17.04/49.00 | 2 /5 stars |

ASEAN NCAP test results Datsun Go (2015)
| Test | Points | Stars |
|---|---|---|
| Adult occupant: | 6.82 | 2 /5 stars |
| Child occupant: | 46% | 2 /5 stars |
| Safety assist: | NA | |

== Awards ==
In the 2016 Frost & Sullivan Automotive Awards, the Go+ received "Indonesia Value-For-Money Car of the Year Award" for its market share, product innovation and also marketing and business development strategies.

== Sales ==
From its launch in 2014 up to May 2015, both the Go and Go+ sold for almost 30,000 units in Indonesia, 70 percent of which came from the Go+.

| Year | Indonesia | | |
| Year | Go | Go+ | Cross |
|---|---|---|---|
| 2014 | 2,733 | 17,787 | |
| 2015 | 9,462 | 19,896 | |
| 2016 | 8,833 | 16,650 | |
| 2017 | 4,303 | 6,181 | |
| 2018 | 4,782 | 3,263 | 2,293 |
| 2019 | 3,013 | 1,612 | 1,862 |
| 2020 | 215 | 85 | 0 |
