= Gérard Detourbet =

French automotive executive (1946–2019)

Gérard Detourbet (28 September 1946 – 5 December 2019) was a French automotive manager at Renault, where he was Managing Director of the Renault–Nissan Alliance "Alliance A Segment Development Unit".

== Career ==
Detourbet was a university mathematics lecturer before joining Renault's computer training center in 1971. Later, he ran through a variety of positions within the Renault Group. These included being responsible for the development of the body of the Renault 25, a product manager for engines, and later for the drive trains.

From 2003, after Renault purchased the Automobile Dacia company from the Romanian government, Detourbet was responsible for the development of the X90 (Logan) project, and concentrated on the production of modern, but very cheap entry-level cars for Eastern Europe and developing countries.

In particular, the development of the Renault Kwid under his leadership has been widely seen as groundbreaking.
