= Nissan Magnite =

Subcompact crossover SUV

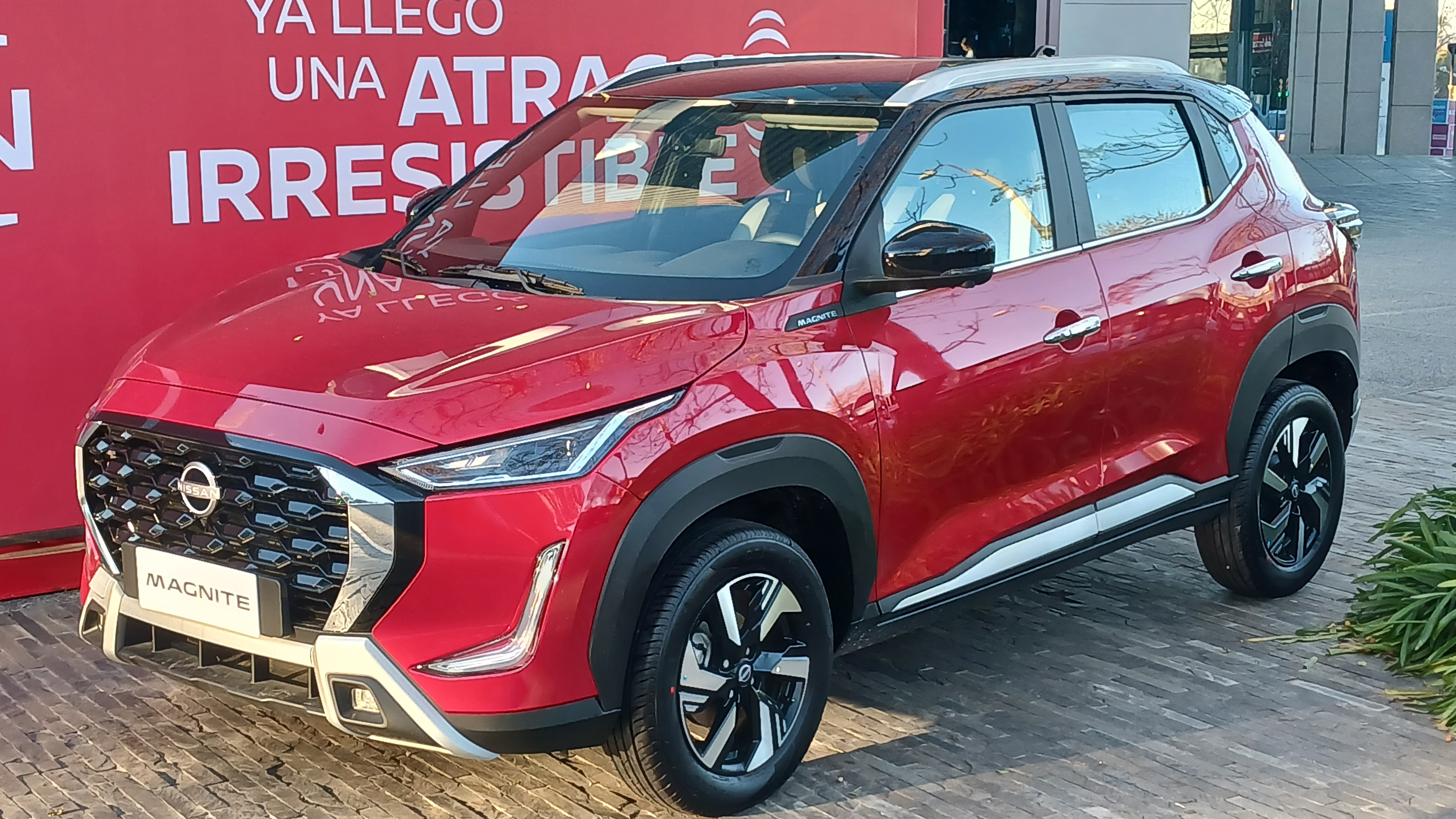
- 2025 Nissan Magnite Exclusive (facelift)

Overview
- Manufacturer: Nissan
- Model code: DD0
- Production: 2020–present
- Assembly: India: Chennai (Renault Nissan India); Egypt: 6th of October

Body and chassis
- Class: Subcompact crossover SUV
- Body style: 5-door SUV
- Layout: Front-engine, front-wheel-drive
- Platform: Renault–Nissan CMF-A+
- Related: Nissan Gravite; Renault Kiger; Renault Triber; Renault Kwid

Powertrain
- Engine: Petrol: 999 cc BR10 HS I3; 999 cc HRA0DET turbo I3
- Transmission: 5-speed manual; 5-speed EZ-Shift automated manual (2023–present); X-Tronic CVT (turbo)

Dimensions
- Wheelbase: 2,500 mm (98.4 in)
- Length: 3,994 mm (157.2 in)
- Width: 1,758 mm (69.2 in)
- Height: 1,572 mm (61.9 in)
- Kerb weight: 939–1,059 kg (2,070–2,335 lb)

Chronology
- Predecessor: Datsun Go/Cross (Indonesia)

The Nissan Magnite is a subcompact crossover SUV manufactured and marketed by Nissan. Unveiled in October 2020, the Magnite is placed below the Juke in Nissan's global SUV lineup, making it the smallest Nissan crossover SUV worldwide.

The name "Magnite" is a portmanteau of the words "magnetic" and "ignite".

== Overview ==
=== Pre-production ===
In its development phase, the Magnite was planned as a flagship SUV for the Datsun marque. However, as the Datsun marque was slated to be discontinued, the Magnite was handed to the Nissan brand in the final phases of its development. The name "Datsun Magnite" has been trademarked in India since April 2019, followed by the name "Nissan Magnite" in March 2020. The vehicle was previewed for the first time in February 2020 in a side view silhouette form. The concept version was revealed virtually on 17 July 2020 as the Magnite Concept.

=== Production model ===
The production model was revealed on 21 October 2020, and production started on 30 October 2020. It was launched in India on 2 December 2020, followed by Indonesia on 21 December.

The vehicle is built on an extended version of the CMF-A platform called the CMF-A+ platform. The platform also underpins the Renault Triber and Kiger. Initially the vehicle was only exported to several right-hand drive emerging markets worldwide, consisting of Indonesia, South Africa, Nepal, Bhutan, Bangladesh, Sri Lanka, Brunei, Uganda, Kenya, Seychelles, Mozambique, Zambia, Mauritius, Tanzania, and Malawi.

In October 2023, the Magnite gained an automated manual transmission option (marketed as EZ-Shift) for the naturally aspirated model.

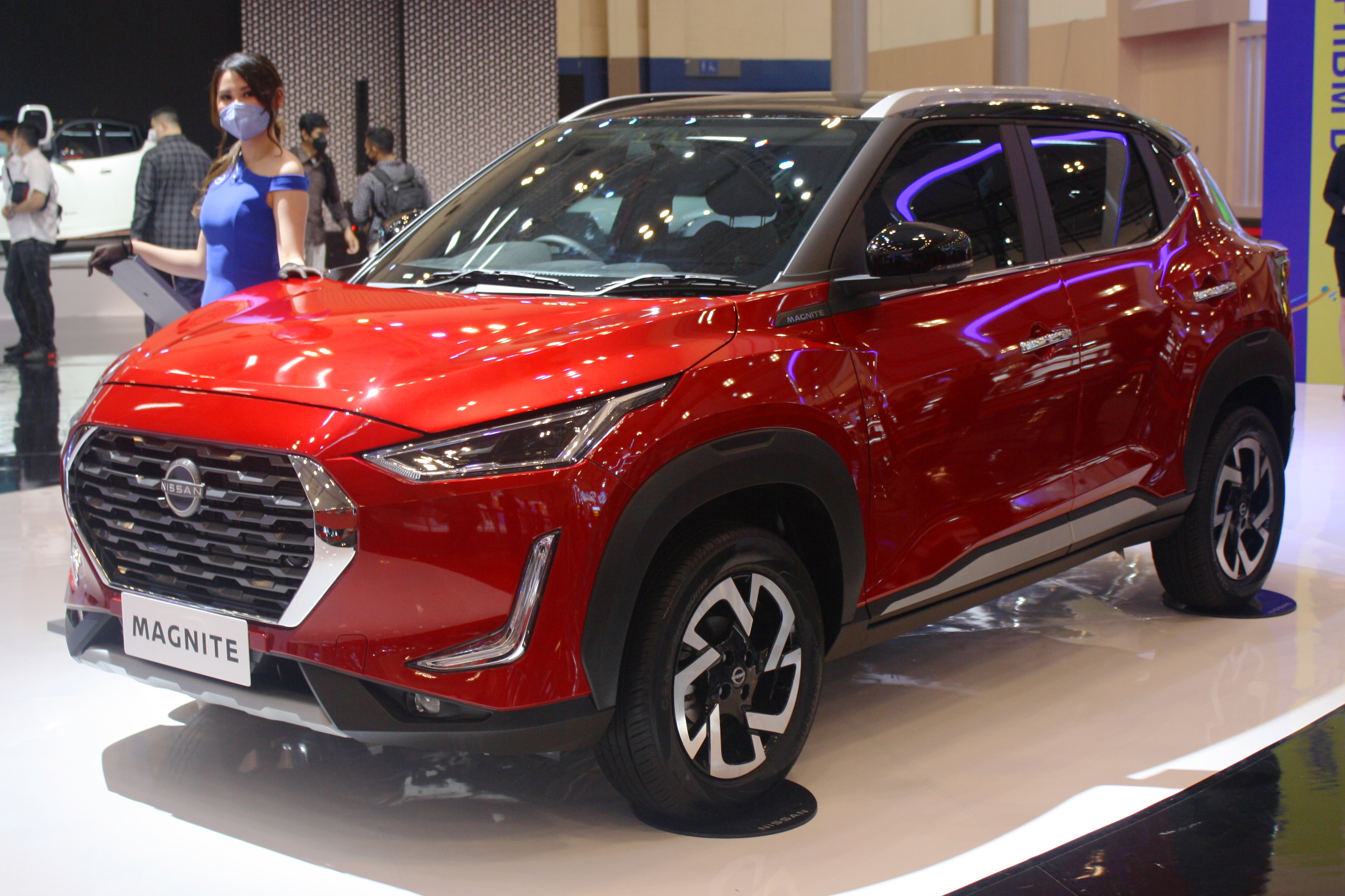
2021 Nissan Magnite Premium (pre-facelift; Indonesia)

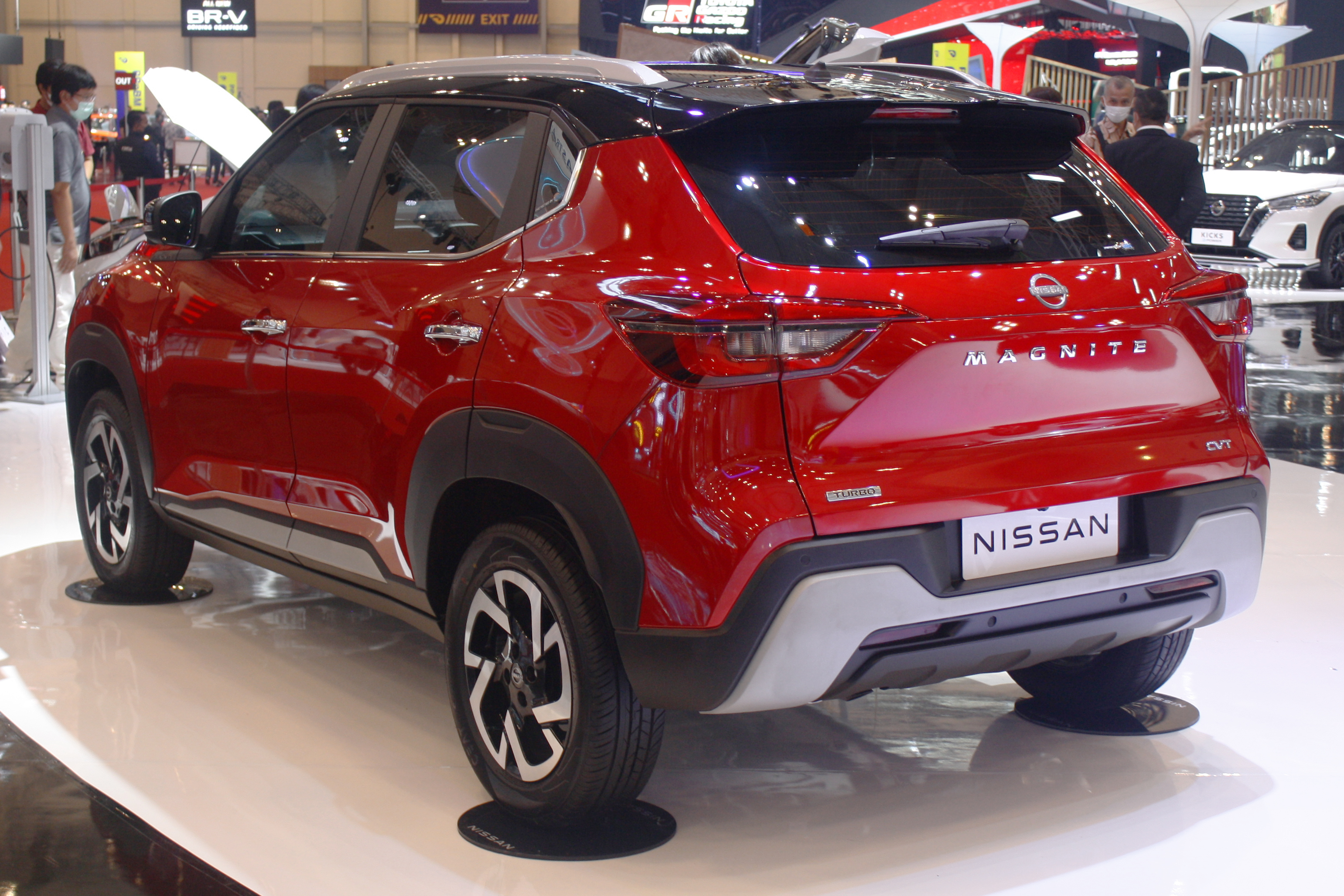
Rear view (pre-facelift)

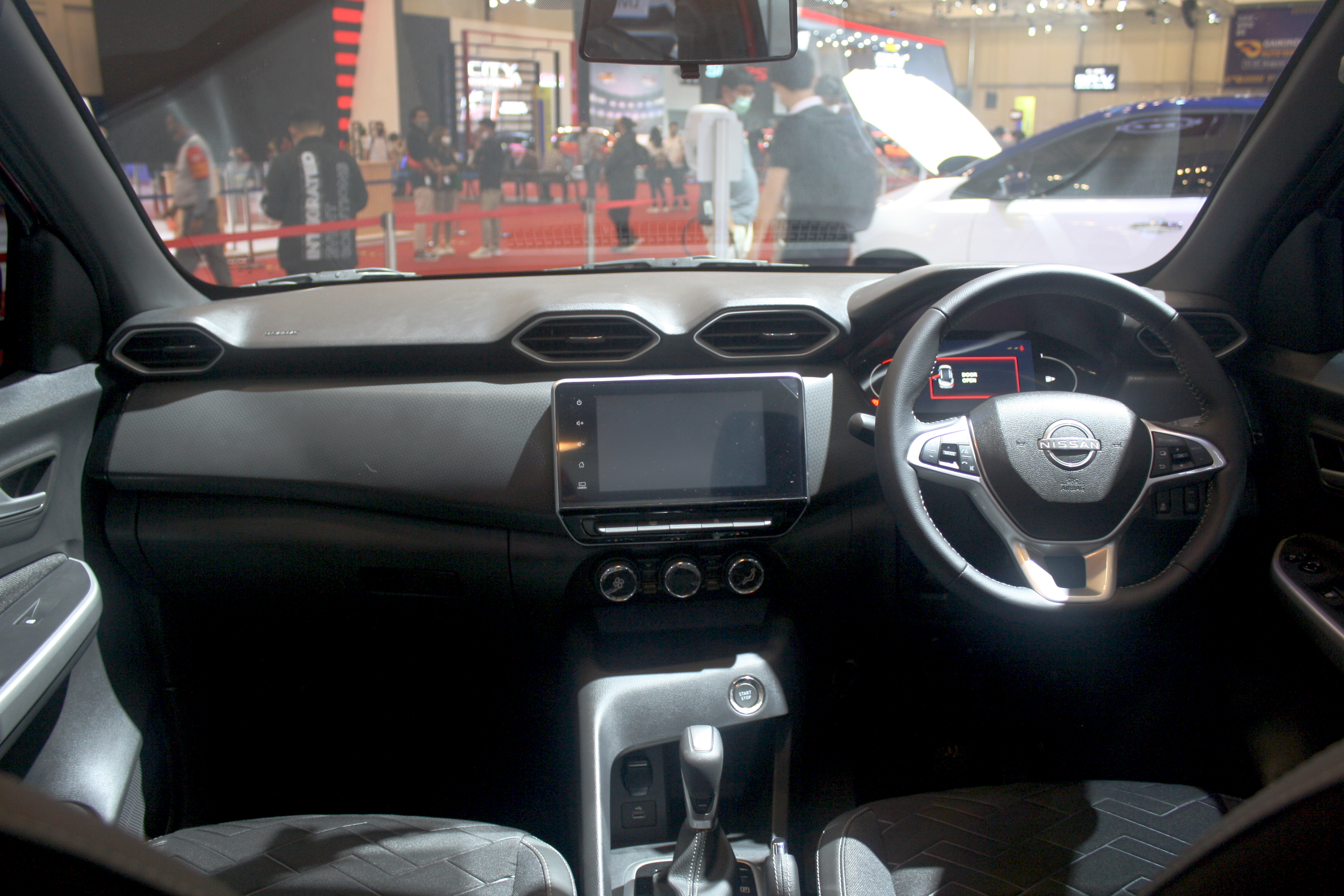
Interior (pre-facelift)

=== Facelift ===
The facelifted Magnite was unveiled on 4 October 2024. The changes includes an updated front fascia with a larger grille, new gloss black surrounds and repositioned foglights, the rear received new taillights with updated lighting graphics, and new alloy wheel designs. Inside, there were minimal changes for the interior but there was a new black and orange colour theme made available.

In February 2025, the facelifted Magnite began exporting to the Middle East, Latin America, North Africa, and Asia-Pacific in left-hand drive version.

The facelifted Magnite debuted in the Middle East on March 17, 2025, featuring a 1.0-liter turbocharged engine paired with a CVT transmission. It comes in three trim levels: S, SV, and SL.

The Magnite was released in Mexico on 4 April 2025, it features a 1.0 liter turbocharged engine paired to a manual or CVT transmission. It comes in trim levels: Advance and Exclusive.

The Magnite was released in Laos on 15 August 2025, and released in Egypt on 25 July 2026 as a CKD Model, it features a 1.0 liter turbocharged engine paired to a CVT transmission.

In 2024, Nissan Philippines previewed the Magnite at the Philippine International Motor Show. The model was subsequently listed in Land Transportation Office (LTO) homologation documents in 2025, confirming its arrival in the local market. The official launch is expected in late 2025 or early 2026, with variants including the VE Turbo and VL Turbo imported from India.

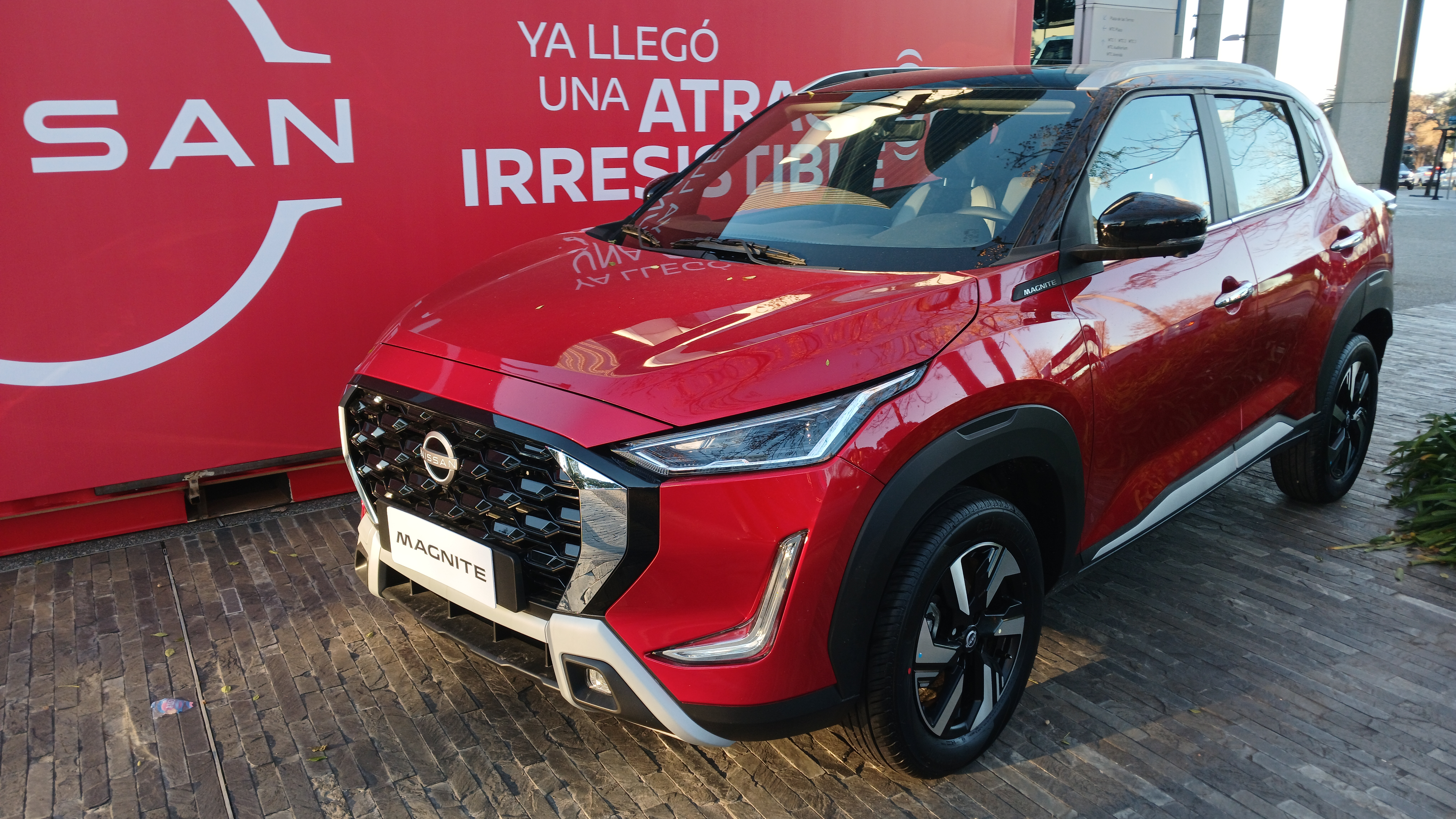
Facelift Magnite (front)

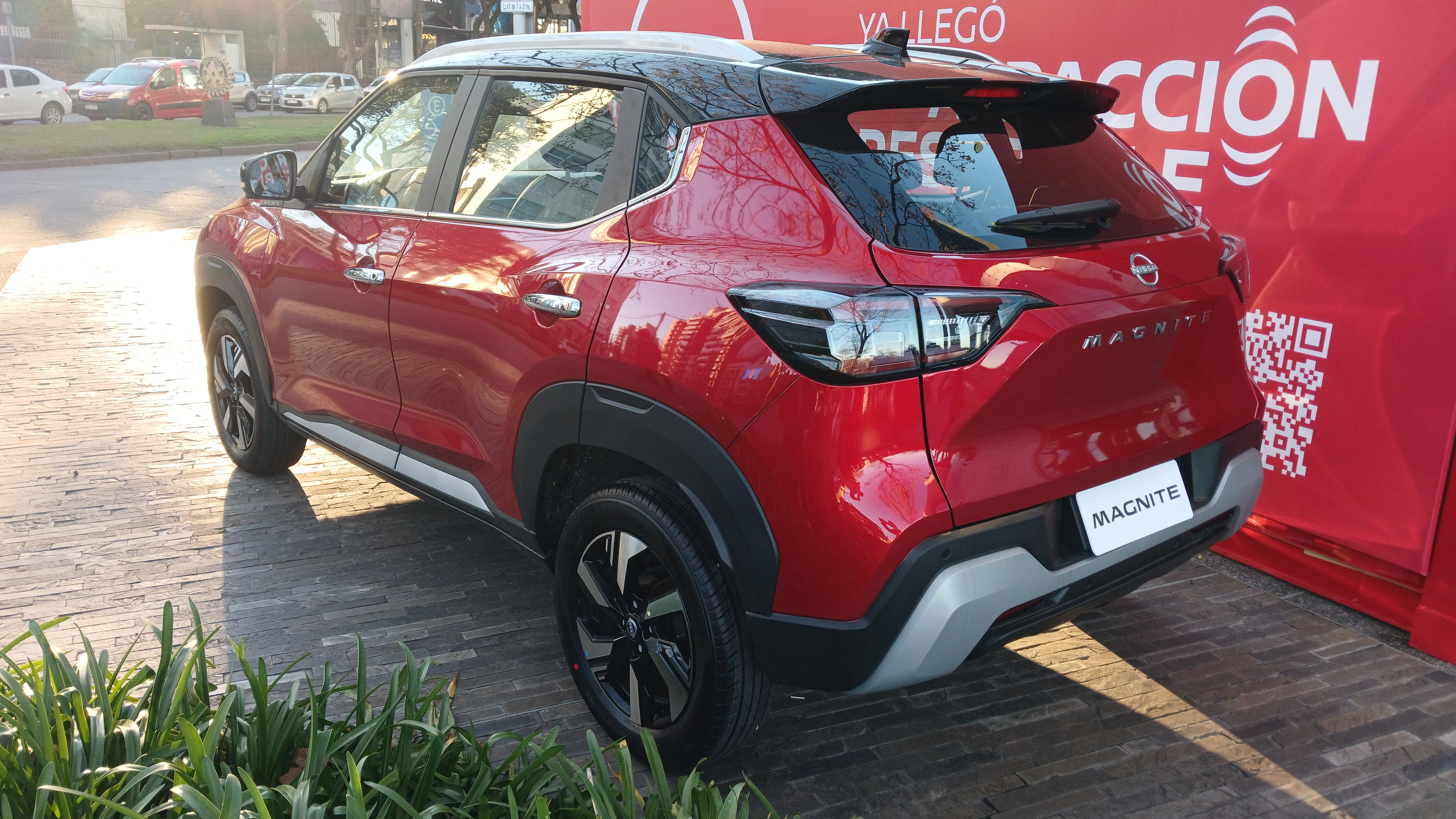
Facelift Magnite (rear)

== Safety ==
=== Global NCAP ===
The pre-facelift Indian market Magnite received 4 stars for adult occupants and 2 stars for toddlers from Global NCAP in H1 2022 (similar to Latin NCAP 2013):

Global NCAP 1.0 test results (India) Nissan Magnite – 2 Airbags (H1 2022, similar to Latin NCAP 2013)
Test	Score	Stars
Adult occupant protection	11.85/17.00	4 /5 stars
Child occupant protection	24.88/49.00	2 /5 stars

The pre-facelift model was then assessed under Global NCAP's new protocols (similar to Latin NCAP 2016), achieving 2 stars for adult and child occupant protection due to the lack of side and curtain airbags and poor availability of ESC.

Global NCAP 2.0 test results (India and South Africa) Nissan Magnite – 2 Airbags (July 2025, similar to Latin NCAP 2016)
Test	Score	Stars
Adult occupant protection	14.49/34.00	4 /5 stars
Child occupant protection	18.89/49.00	2 /5 stars

Nissan then submitted the facelifted Magnite for a voluntary test, achieving 4 stars for adult and child occupant protection, with protection of the driver's chest in the frontal test being deemed "weak".

Global NCAP 2.0 test results (India and South Africa) Nissan Magnite – 6 Airbags (July 2025, similar to Latin NCAP 2016)
Test	Score	Stars
Adult occupant protection	26.51/34.00	4 /5 stars
Child occupant protection	36.00/49.00	2 /5 stars

Nissan then made unspecified changes to the Magnite's restraint systems, and achieved 5 stars for adult occupant protection. Driver chest protection was deemed "good", and Nissan demonstrated that the knees of occupants of different statures would be safeguarded from hard structures in the dashboard.

Global NCAP 2.0 test results (India and South Africa) Nissan Magnite – 6 Airbags (July 2025, similar to Latin NCAP 2016)
Test	Score	Stars
Adult occupant protection	32.31/34.00	5 /5 stars
Child occupant protection	33.61/49.00	3 /5 stars

=== ASEAN NCAP ===
The ASEAN market Magnite received 4 stars from ASEAN NCAP in 2020:

ASEAN NCAP test results Nissan Magnite (2020)
Test	Points
Overall:	4 /5 stars
Adult occupant:	28.09
Child occupant:	31.96
Safety assist:	11.00

== Sales ==
Year	India	South Africa	Indonesia
2020	560		
2021	34,086	3,263	434
2022	32,546	6,065	453
2023	30,146	8,581	303
2024	29,009	10,059	135
