= Ashok Leyland STiLE =

STiLE
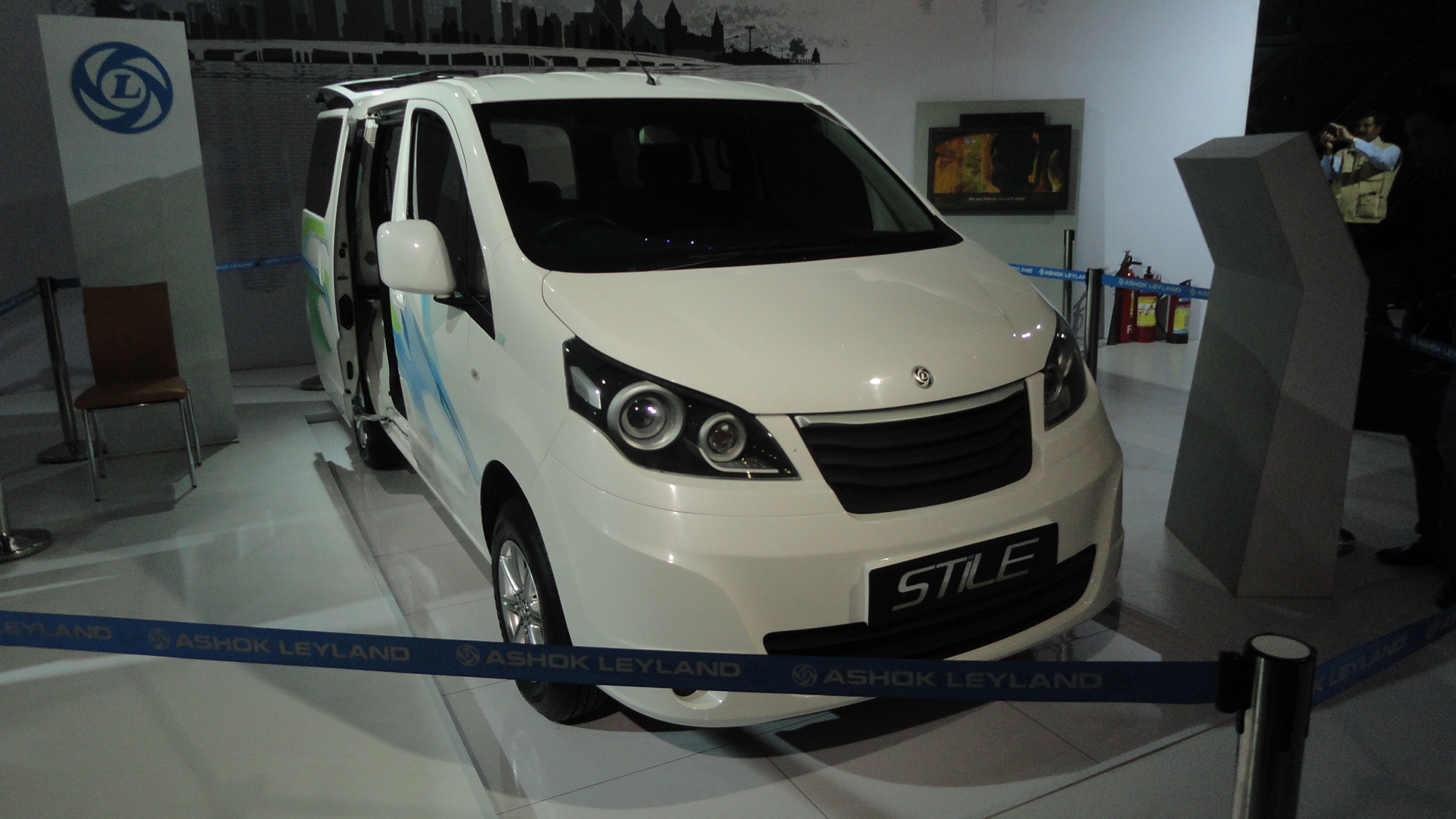
- Ashok Leyland STiLE

Overview
- Type: Minivan
- Manufacturer: Ashok Leyland
- Also called: Nissan NV200
- Production: July 2013–May 2015
- Assembly: India

Body and chassis
- Class: Minivan
- Body style: 5-door MPV
- Layout: Front-engine, rear-wheel-drive
- Platform: Nissan Evalia

Powertrain
- Engine: 1,461 cm^{3} (89.16 cu in): Common rail dCi (diesel)
- Transmission: Manual

Dimensions
- Wheelbase: 2,725 mm (107.2835 in)
- Length: 4,400 mm (173.23 in)
- Width: 1,700 mm (66.93 in)
- Height: 1,860 mm (73.23 in)
- Curb weight: 1,426 kg (3,144 lb)

Chronology
- Predecessor: Nissan Evalia
- Successor: None

The Ashok Leyland STiLE (or STiLE) is a minivan manufactured by Ashok Leyland and was a rebadged Nissan NV200 produced under license for the Indian market. The vehicle was unveiled during the 2012 Auto Expo and was launched in July 2013.

STiLE was produced as a "minivan" to be used as a commercial vehicle (hotel shuttles, taxi, ambulances, panel van, courier service, inter-city) and for intra-city travel.

== History ==
The STiLE was unveiled during India's 2012 Auto Expo. It was launched on July 16, 2013. The vehicle was a modified Evalia platform and it was manufactured the same plant as that of the Evalia. STiLE was manufactured as a MPV for urban conditions. The prototype STiLE unveiled at the Auto Expo had Ashok Leyland's 1.5-liter engine which was later replaced by the K9K (a family of straight-4 turbocharged diesel engines co-developed by Nissan and Renault) that powers the Evalia.

Unlike the Evalia, which produced 85 bhp (63 kW), STiLE produced 75 bhp (56 kW). The company had initially planned to introduce a compressed natural gas (CNG) engine along with the conventional diesel engine.

On February 27, 2015, an Ashok Leyland representative said that there were plans to relaunch the STiLE.

In May 2015, Ashok Leyland shut down production of the vehicle due to low demand.

== Variants ==
Although Ashok Leyland had originally announced two different engine types (CNG and diesel), STiLE was manufactured only with diesel engines.

STiLE had three variants: LE, LS and LX. All three variants had same engine displacement, bhp and specifications except for seating capacity (LE had 8 seats whereas other two variants had option between 7 and 8 seats) and alloy wheels given as an option with LS and LX variants.

== See also ==
- Nissan NV200
