= Nissan NV200 =

Light 4/5 door van

Nissan NV200 (M20)
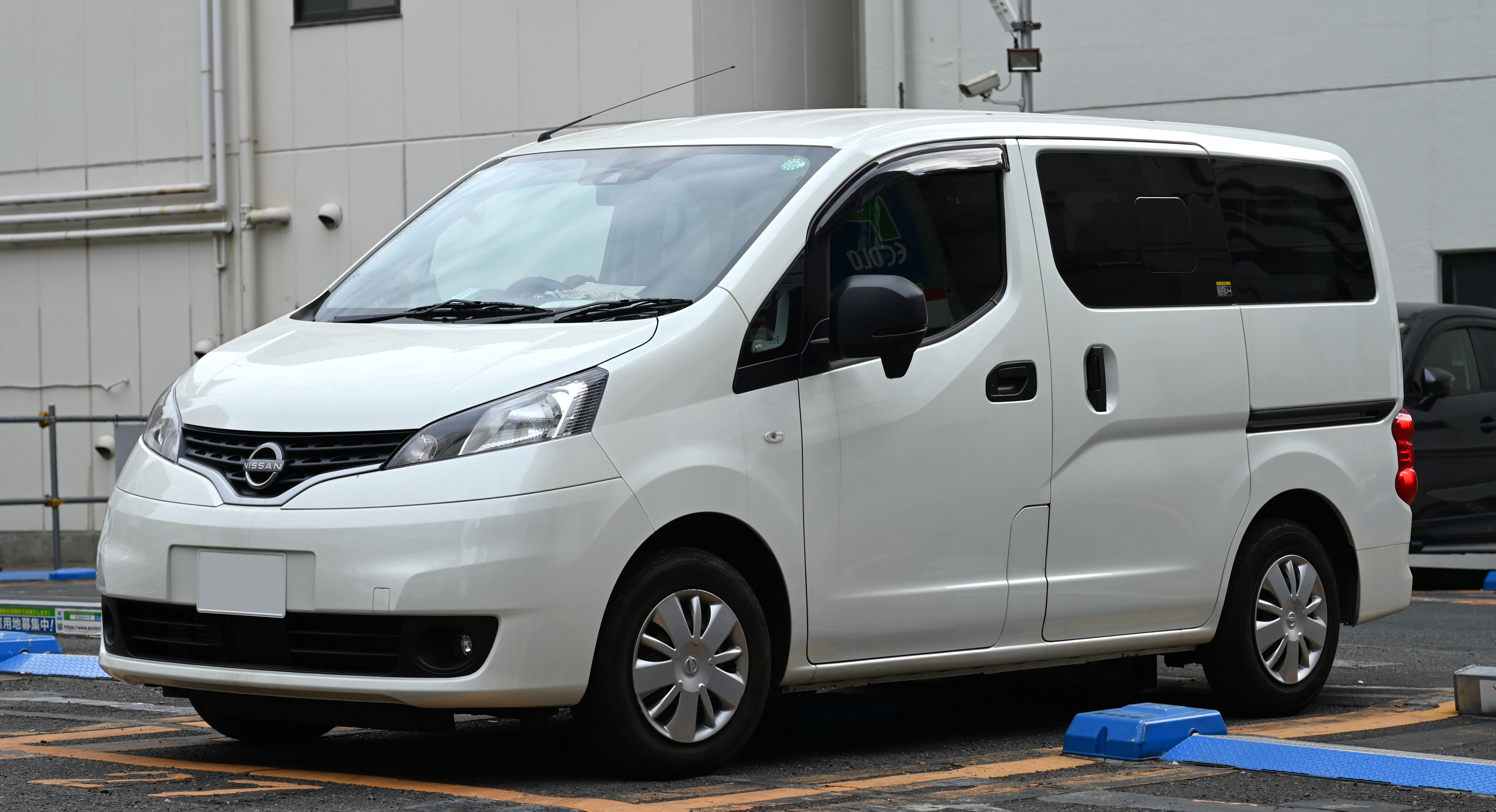
- 2021 Nissan NV200 Vanette (Japan)

Overview
- Manufacturer: Nissan
- Also called: Nissan Evalia (India and Indonesia); Nissan NV200 Vanette (Japan); Mitsubishi Delica D:3; Mitsubishi Delica Van; Chevrolet City Express; e-Wolf Delta 2 Shuttle (electric); Ashok Leyland Stile (India)
- Production: 2009–present
- Assembly: Japan: Shōnan, Kanagawa (Nissan Shatai); Mexico: Jiutepec, Morelos (Nissan Mexico); Spain: Barcelona (Nissan Motor Ibérica: 2009–2021); China: Zhengzhou, Henan (Zhengzhou Nissan); India: Chennai (Renault Nissan India: 2012–2015); Indonesia: Purwakarta (NMI: 2012–2016); Malaysia: Kuala Lumpur (TCMA)

Body and chassis
- Class: Light commercial vehicle/Leisure activity vehicle (M)
- Body style: 4/5-door van
- Layout: Front-engine, front-wheel-drive Front-engine, four-wheel-drive
- Platform: Renault–Nissan B platform

Powertrain
- Engine: Petrol: 1.5 L HR15DE I4; 1.6 L HR16DE I4; 2.0 L MR20DE I4; Diesel: 1.5 L K9K I4
- Electric motor: EM57 AC synchronous motor (e-NV200)
- Transmission: CVT; 4-speed automatic 5-speed manual 6-speed manual (Europe)

Dimensions
- Wheelbase: 2,725 mm (107.3 in); 2,926 mm (115.2 in) (North America)
- Length: 4,400–4,410 mm (173.2–173.6 in); 4,729 mm (186.2 in) (North America)
- Width: 1,695 mm (66.7 in); 1,730 mm (68.1 in) (North America)
- Height: 1,855–1,885 mm (73.0–74.2 in); 1,867 mm (73.5 in) (North America)

Chronology
- Predecessor: Nissan NV200/Evalia: Nissan Kubistar (Europe); Nissan Vanette Van (Japan); Mitsubishi Delica D:3/Delica Van: Mitsubishi Delica Cargo (Japan)
- Successor: Nissan NV250 (Europe)

The Nissan NV200 is a light commercial and leisure activity, 4/5-door van designed and produced by the Japanese automaker Nissan since 2009.

== Overview ==
The vehicle was previewed as the NV200 Concept at the 2007 Tokyo Motor Show, followed by the 2008 Nissan Tenjin Motor Show. The concept vehicle was equipped with a remote control panel for a spider camera, and equipment for organizing and editing photographs and images on the move.

The vehicle was unveiled at the 2009 Geneva Motor Show, followed by 2010 Beijing International Automobile Exhibition. The vehicle went on sale in Japan before summer 2009, followed by Europe in autumn 2009 and then in China and other markets. Available in combi and passenger car versions, NV200 was built on a modified version of Nissan's B platform, with fully independent strut type front suspension mounted on a separate subframe and a leaf spring rear axle.

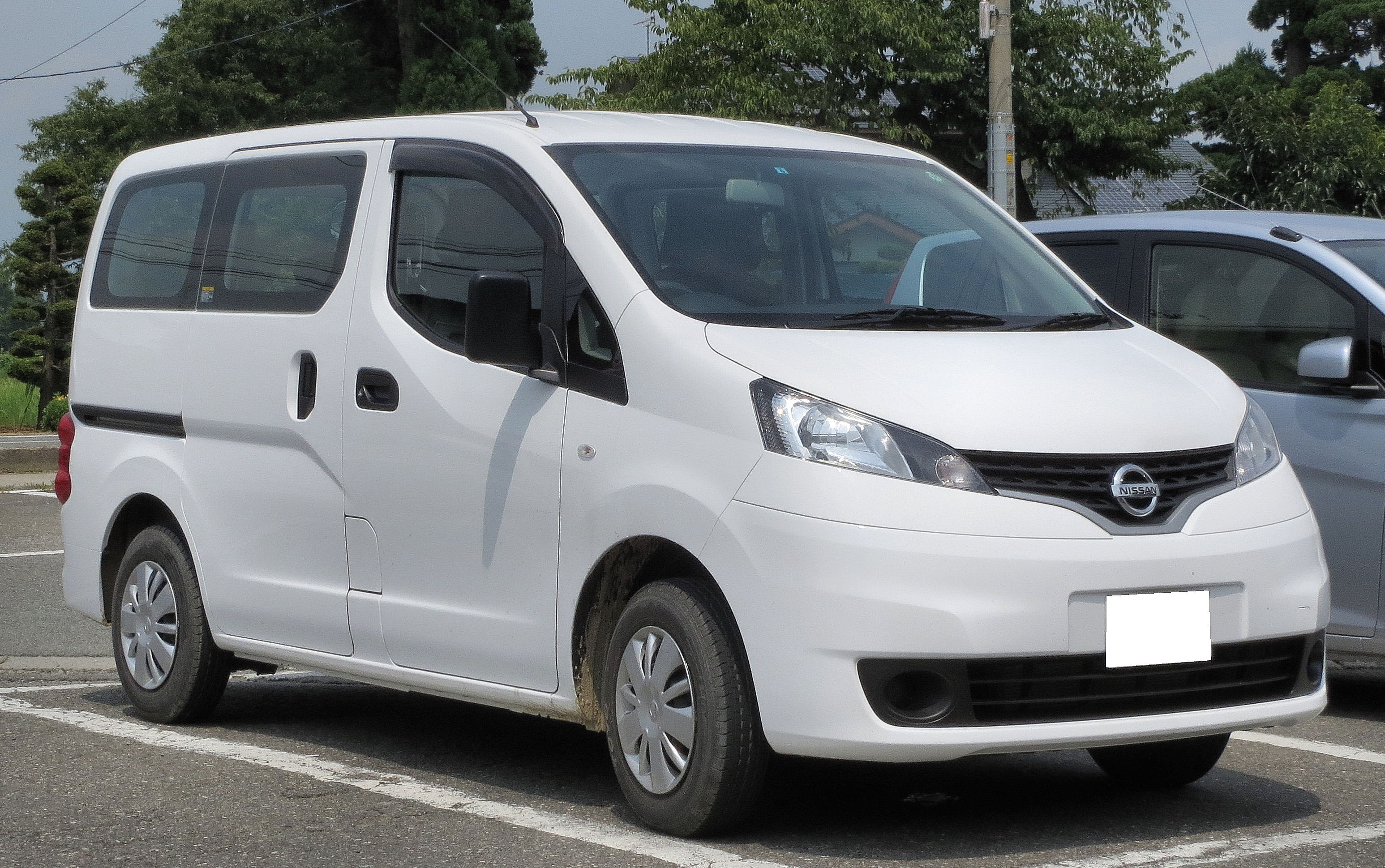
Nissan NV200 Vanette Van VX (Japan)

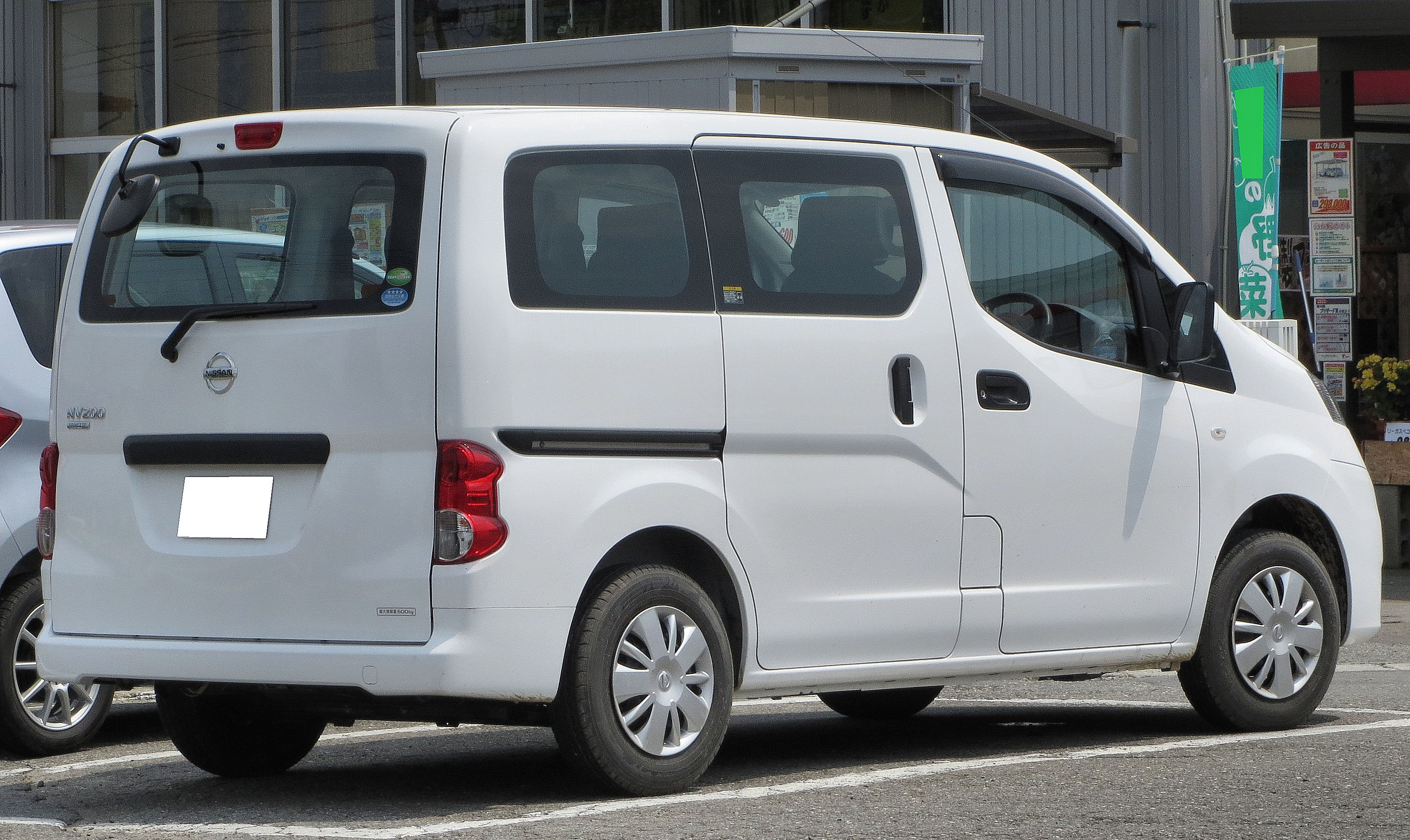
Nissan NV200 Vanette Van VX (Japan)

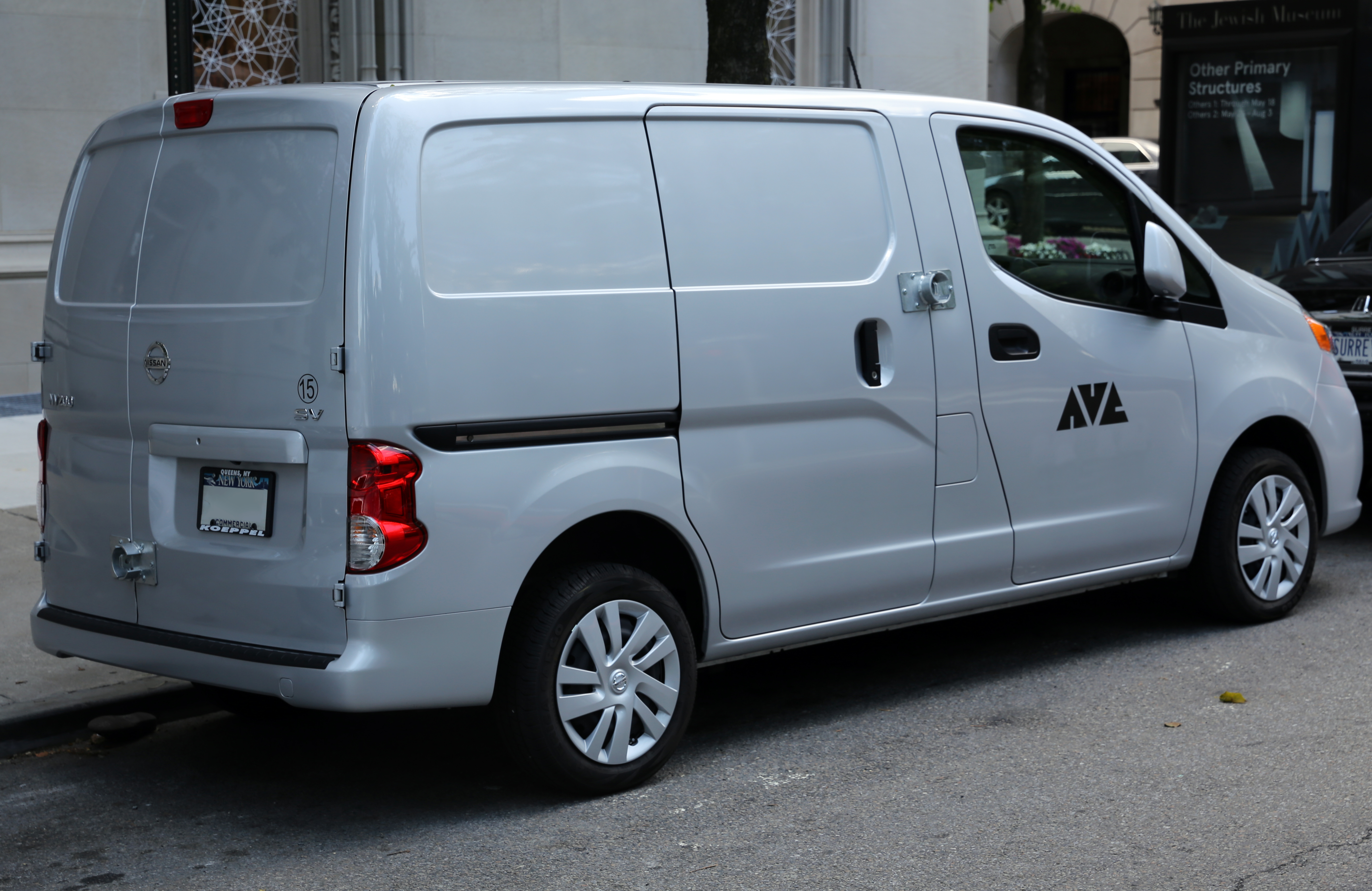
Nissan NV200 SV van (US)

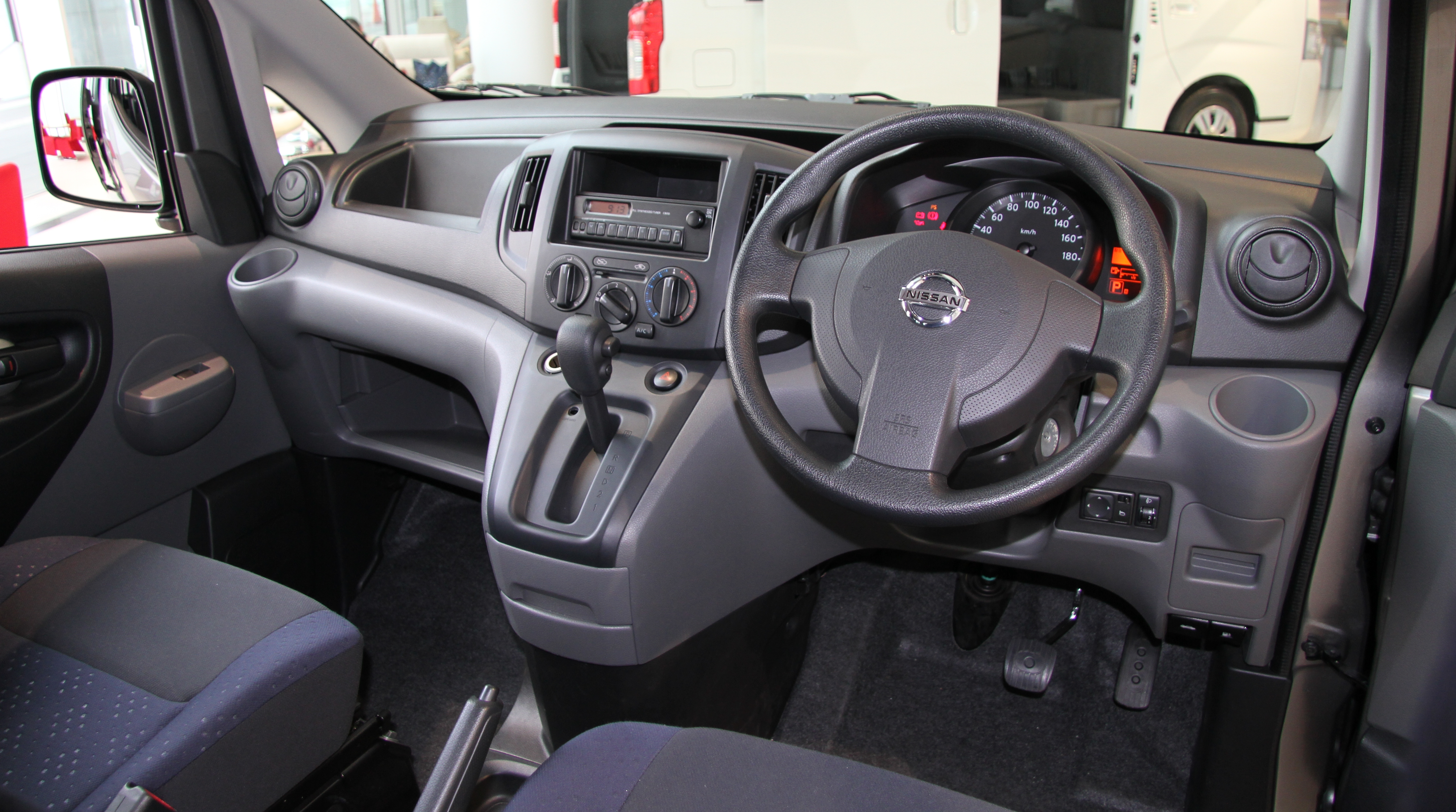
Interior

== Markets ==
=== Japan ===
In Japan, the NV200 Vanette replacing the older Nissan Vanette. The NV200 Vanette went on sale on 21 May 2009 in Japan. At launch, the NV200 Vanette was available in 3 grades: DX van, GX van, and 16S wagon.

In October 2010, the wagon 16S was replaced with 16X-2R and 16X-3R. the VX grade available in the same year.

In 2022, the passenger car variant get some improvements, the camper-based MyRoom variant was also released.

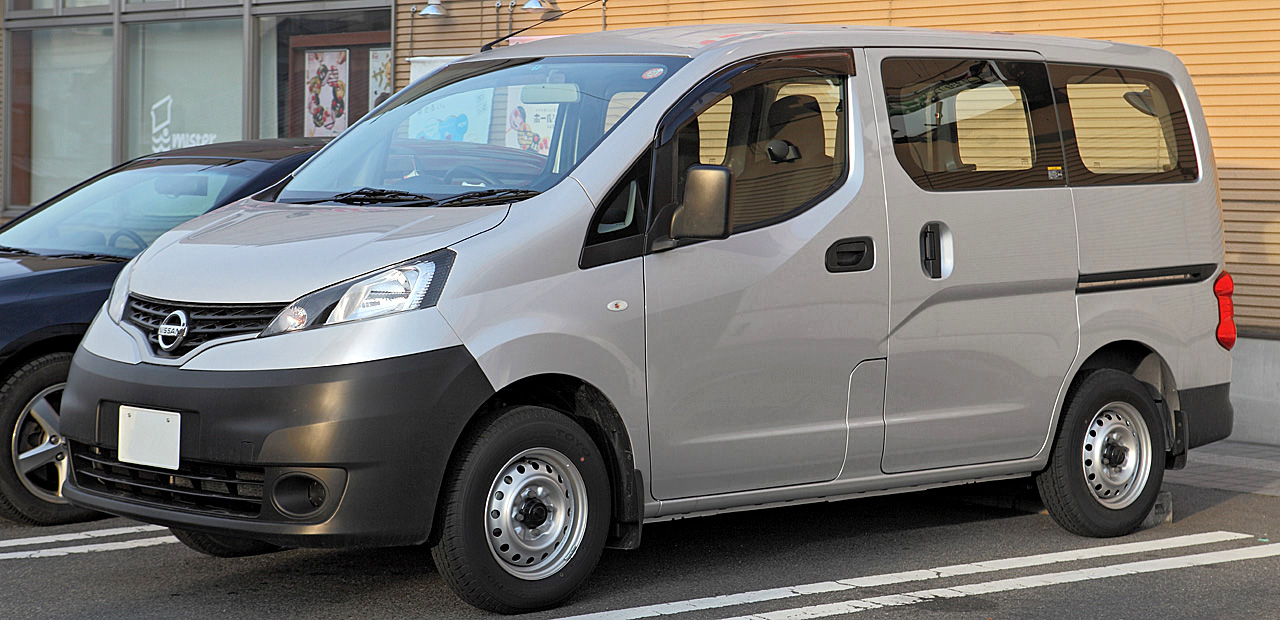
Nissan NV200 Vanette Van DX (Japan)

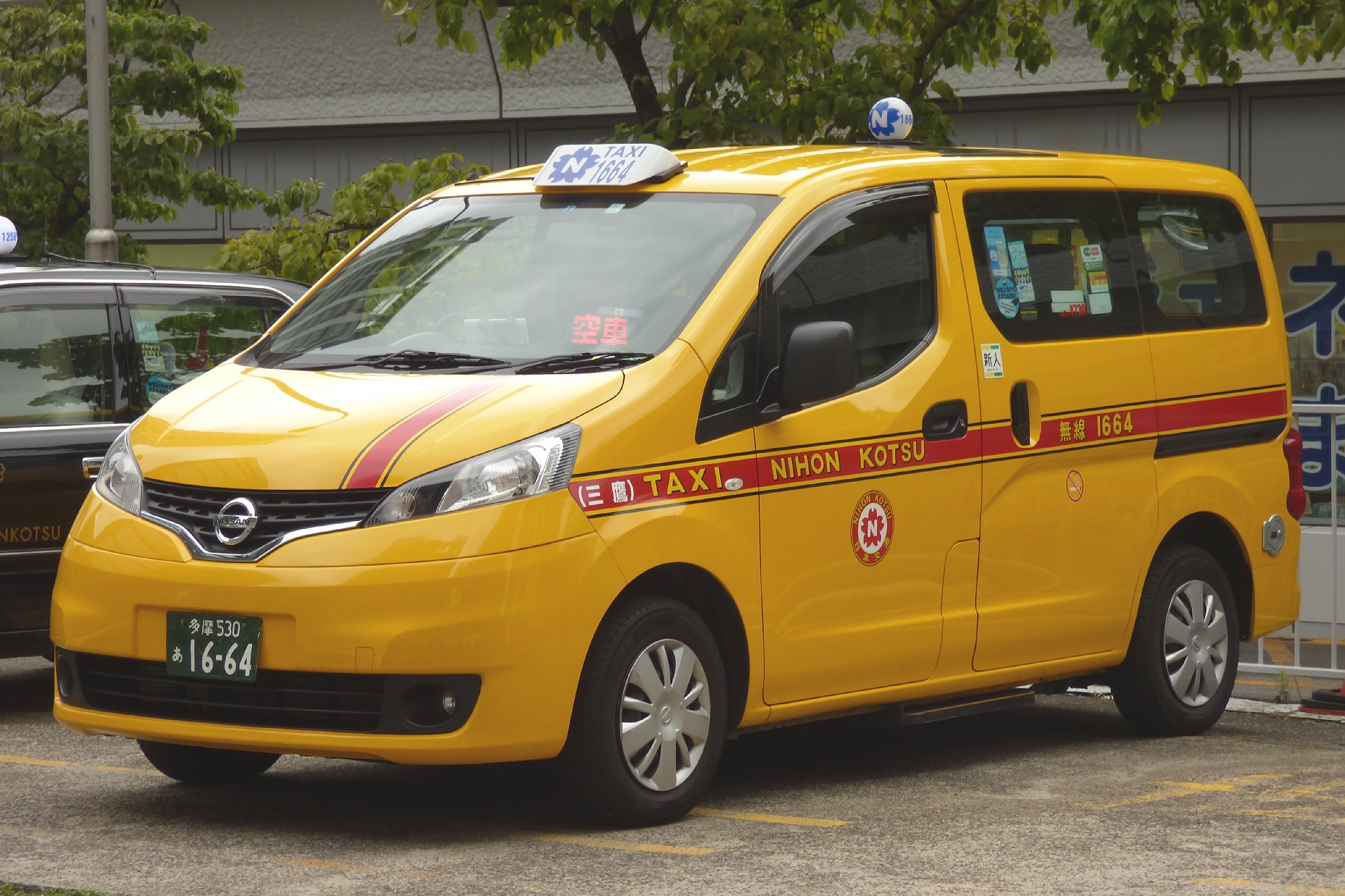
Nissan Vanette Taxi (Japan)

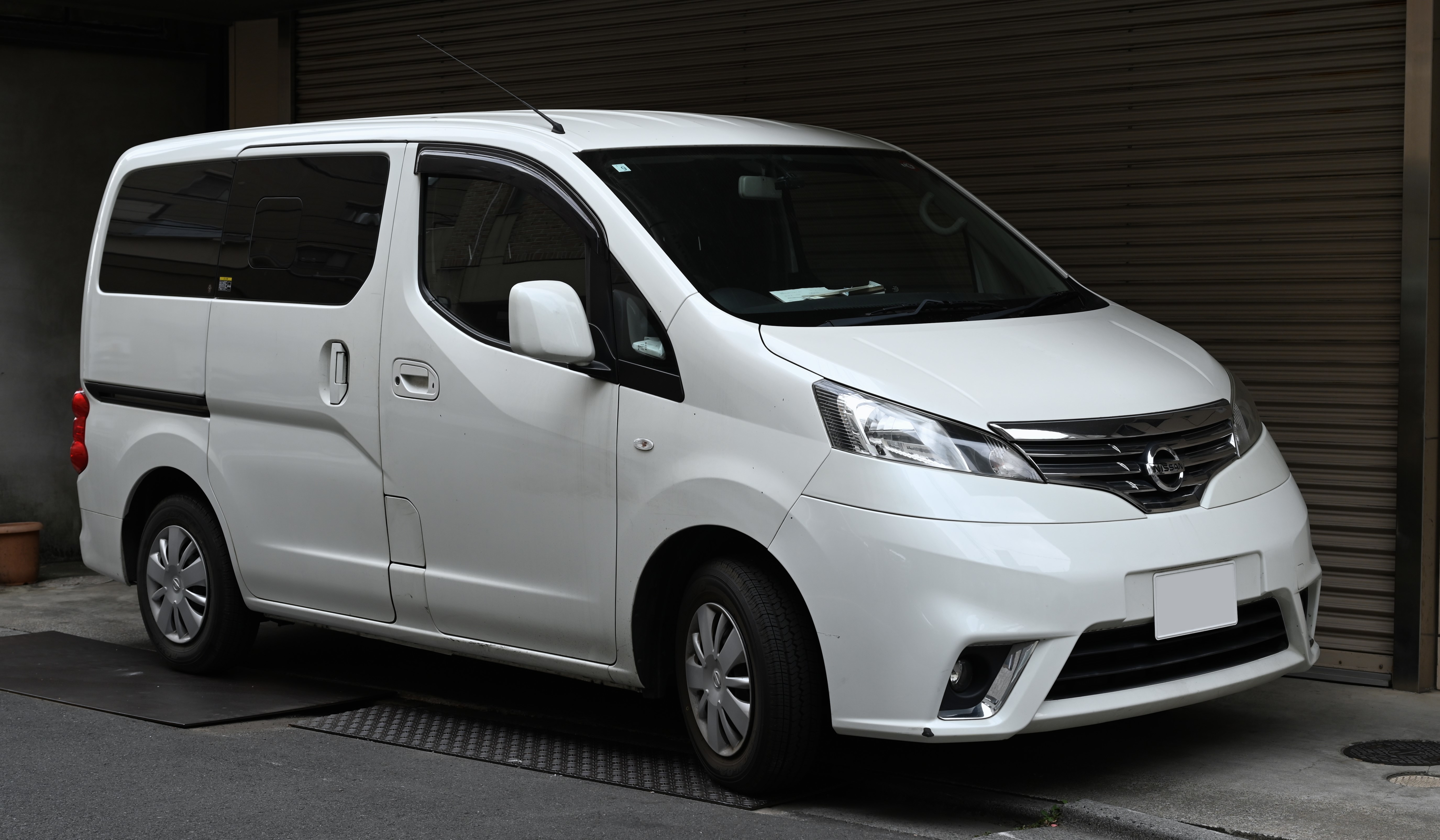
Nissan NV200 Vanette Premium GX

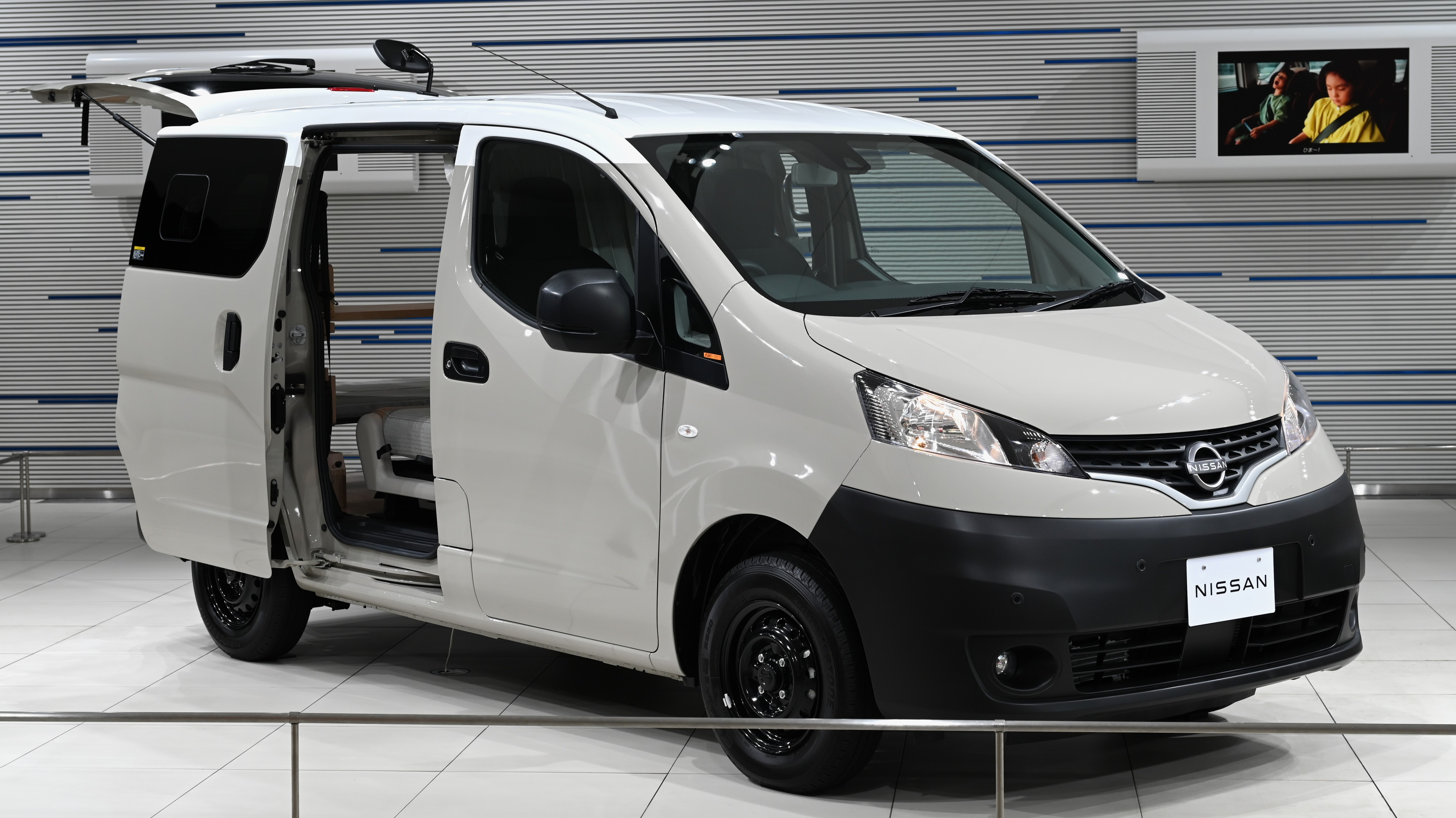
Nissan NV200 Vanette DX MyRoom

==== Mitsubishi Delica D:3 and Delica Van (2011–2019) ====
A Badge engineered versions of the NV200 was sold in Japan by Mitsubishi Motors as the Mitsubishi Delica D:3 and Delica Van. Both are equipped with a 1.6-liter straight-four engine. Both models went on sale in Japan on 6 October 2011.

At launch Delica D:3 models include the M (5-seater) and G (7-seater), while the Delica Van models include DX (2/5-person) (5MT/4AT), GX (2/5-person) (4AT). The Delica D:3 and Delica Van were discontinued in April 2019 due to poor sales.

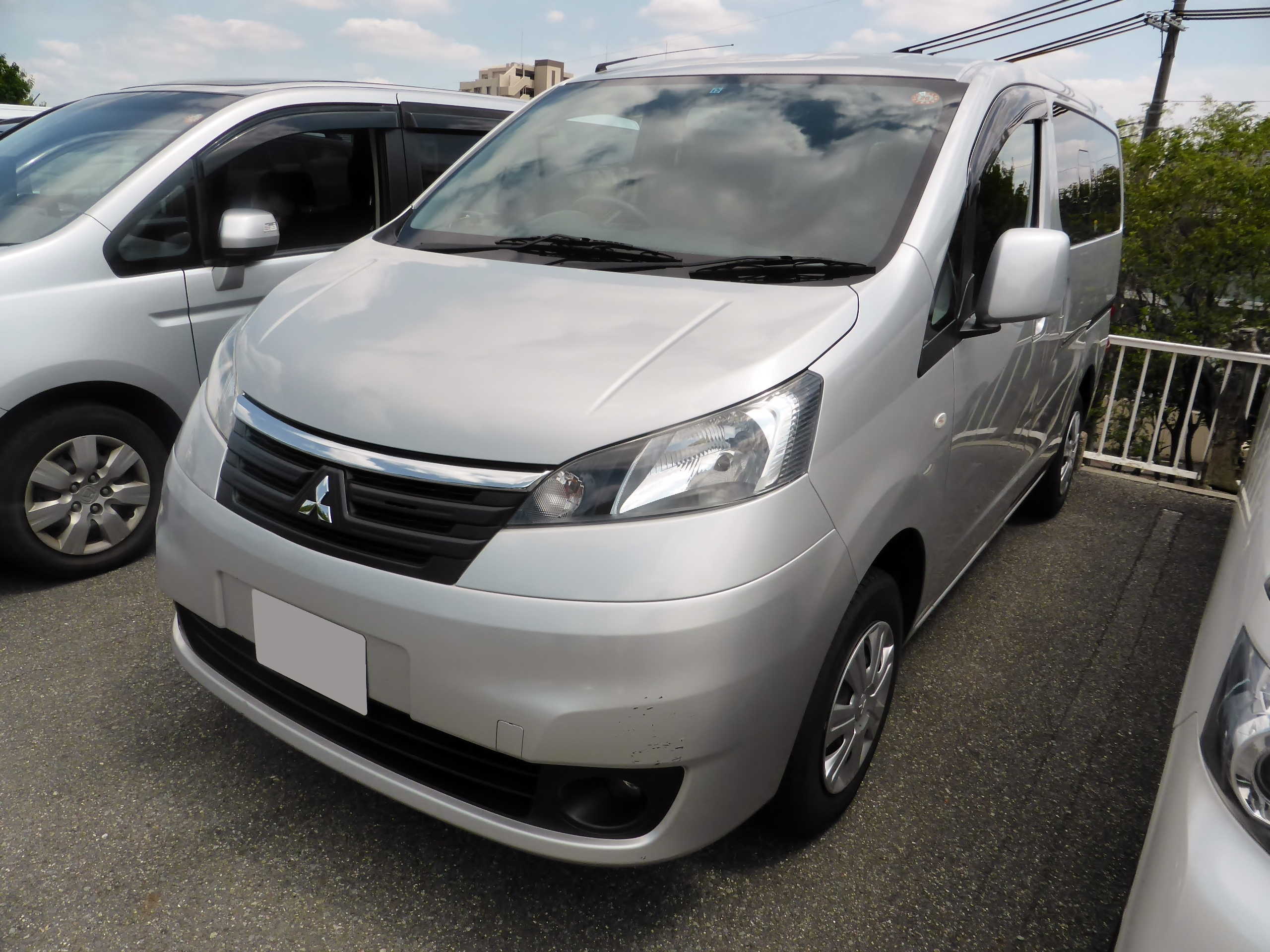
Mitsubishi Delica D:3 G (BM20)

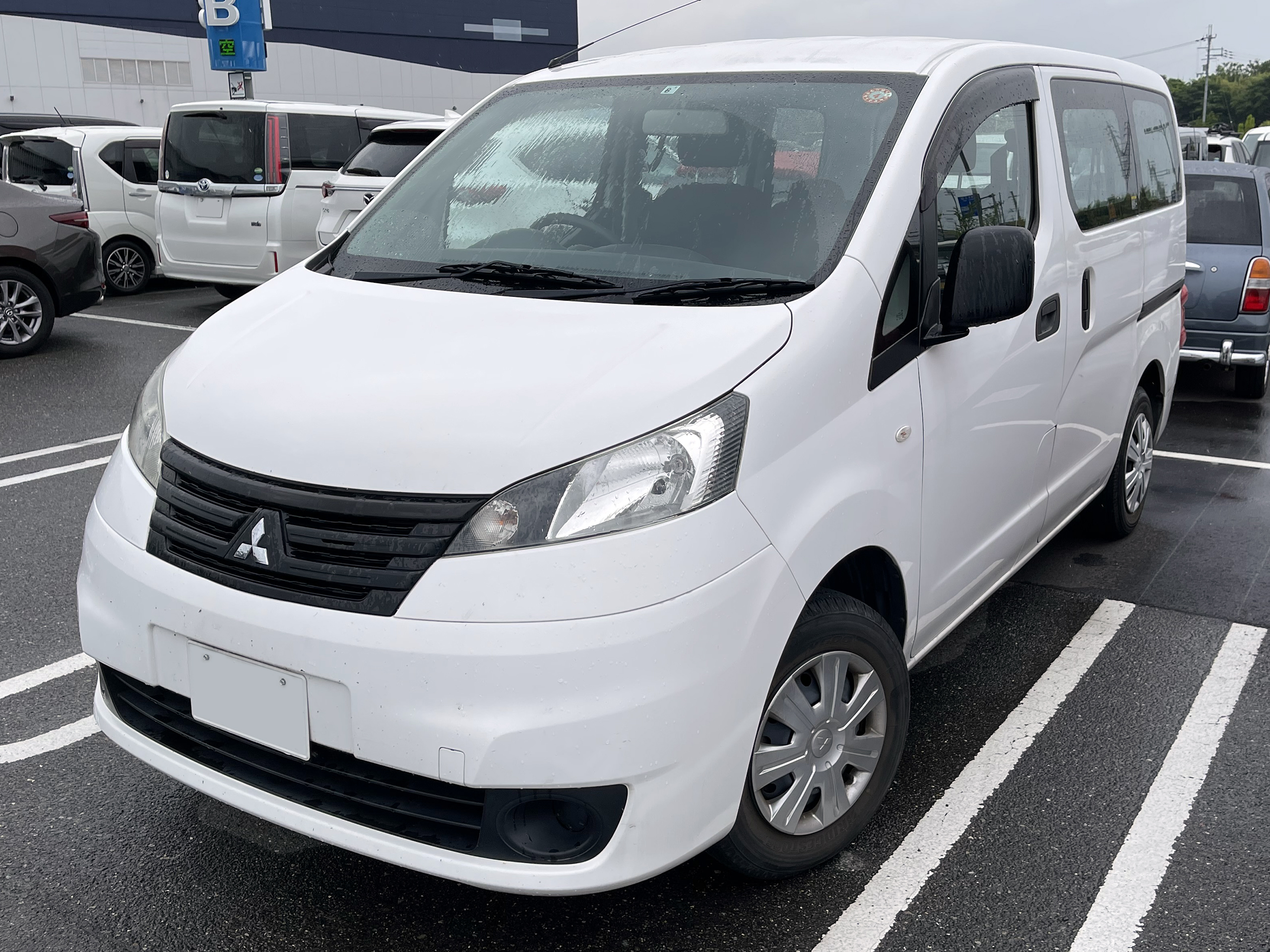
Mitsubishi Delica Van DX (BVM20)

=== North America ===
The Nissan NV200 began production at Nissan Mexicana's Cuernevaca Assembly plant in 2013 for the North American market. By 2020, Nissan had captured only a small fraction of the commercial van market in America, and announced shortly afterward that NV200 production for North America would end in summer 2021.

==== NV200 New York City taxi ====
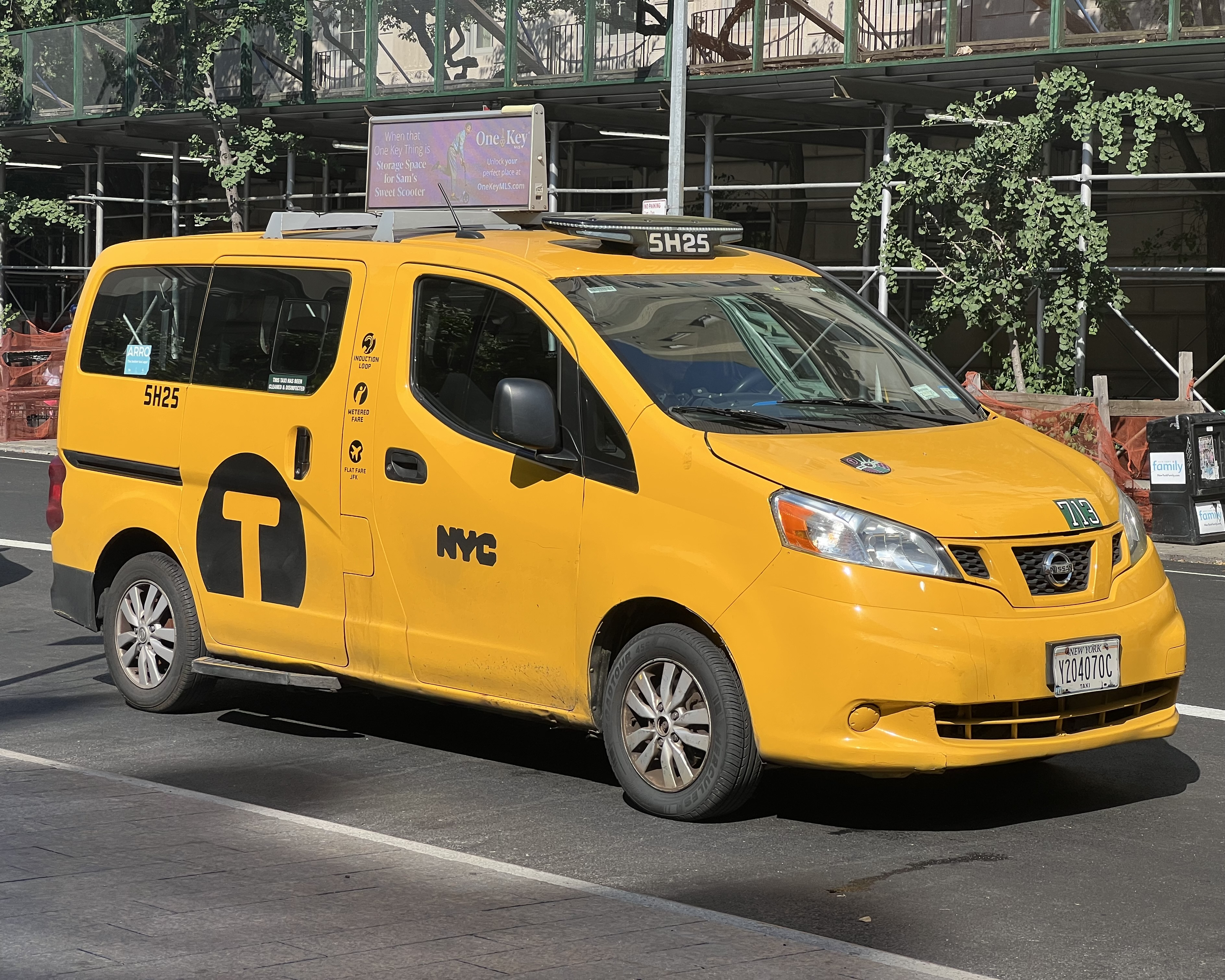
Nissan NV200 New York City Taxi

The prototype version of the NV200 New York taxi vehicle was unveiled in 2011 Nissan Taxi of Tomorrow Design Expo, followed by 2012 New York International Auto Show, Nissan's Yokohama headquarters, and 2012 Paris Motor Show.

It is equipped with a 2.0-litre 4-cylinder engine, a low-annoyance horn with exterior lights that indicate when the vehicle is honking, sliding doors with entry step and grab handles, transparent roof panel (with shade), independently controlled rear air conditioning with a grape phenol-coated air filter, breathable, antimicrobial, environmentally friendly and easy-to-clean seat fabric that simulates the look and feel of leather; overhead reading lights for passengers and floor lighting to help locate belongings, a mobile charging station for passengers that includes a 12 V electrical outlet and two USB plugs, a six-way adjustable driver's seat that features both recline and lumbar adjustments, even with a partition installed; standard driver's navigation and telematics systems; front and rear-seat occupant curtain airbags, as well as seat-mounted airbags for the front row; standard traction control and Vehicle Dynamic Control (VDC), lights that alert other road users that taxi doors are opening.

The production model was unveiled at the 2013 Matsuya Ginza's 'New York Week' fair, and went on sale as 2014 model year vehicle. The Nissan NV200 New York City taxi was built in North America at Nissan's facility in Cuernavaca, Mexico.

The vehicle entered the New York City taxi fleet near the end of October 2013. The first buyer of Nissan NV200 New York City taxi was medallion number 7F20 owner Ranjit Singh, with delivery of taxi from Koeppel Nissan in Queens on 18 October 2013, and first 1-passenger fare service performed from JFK International Airport on 23 October 2013 to Manhattan.

New York Supreme Court Justice Peter Moulton ruled that the deal between NYC and Nissan was "null, void and unenforceable" since the NV200 is not a hybrid vehicle. In addition, Manhattan Supreme Court Justice Schlomo Hagler ruled the New York City Taxi and Limousine Commission exceeded its authority for mandating the city's taxi fleets be replaced by Nissan NV200. That ruling was overturned by a New York appeals court on 10 June 2014, with Justice David B. Saxe finding that the commission's mandate was legal.

As of 16 December 2013, Nissan was in the process of distributing the first 200 units of the NV200 New York City taxi to dealers across New York City. The company also delivered another couple of hundred new taxis to dealers in Seattle, Los Angeles, Salt Lake City and Texas.

A version of NV200 New York City taxi with rear ramp for wheelchair access, integrated restraint system for securing of wheelchairs was unveiled at the 2012 New York International Auto Show as the NV200 Mobility Taxi. The conversion of the NV200 Mobility Taxi was done by BraunAbility.

==== NV200 Compact Cargo Van ====
The NV200 Compact Cargo Van was unveiled at the 2012 Chicago Auto Show. US models went on sale at Nissan Commercial Vehicle dealers beginning in early 2013 as 2013 model year vehicles. Early models include a 2.0-liter 16-valve 4-cylinder engine and Xtronic CVT. The 2014 model year vehicle went on sale in January 2014. The introductory lineup consisted of the S and SV models.

=== Europe ===
Sales of European models of NV200 van and combi began from October 2009 in most European markets, followed by Family version in 2010. Early models include the 1.6-litre HR16 petrol with 108 PS (79 kW) or 1.5 dCi (K9K) diesel engine with 86 PS (63 kW), five-speed manual transmission, optional rear view parking camera. European models of NV200 were produced in Japan, until production started at Nissan's plant in Barcelona in November 2009.

On 1 February 2019, Nissan announced the discontinuation of the internal combustion engined NV200 in Europe and replaced it with the NV250, a rebadged Renault Kangoo. The last diesel NV200s were manufactured in mid-2019, and sales of this model were discontinued by early 2020.

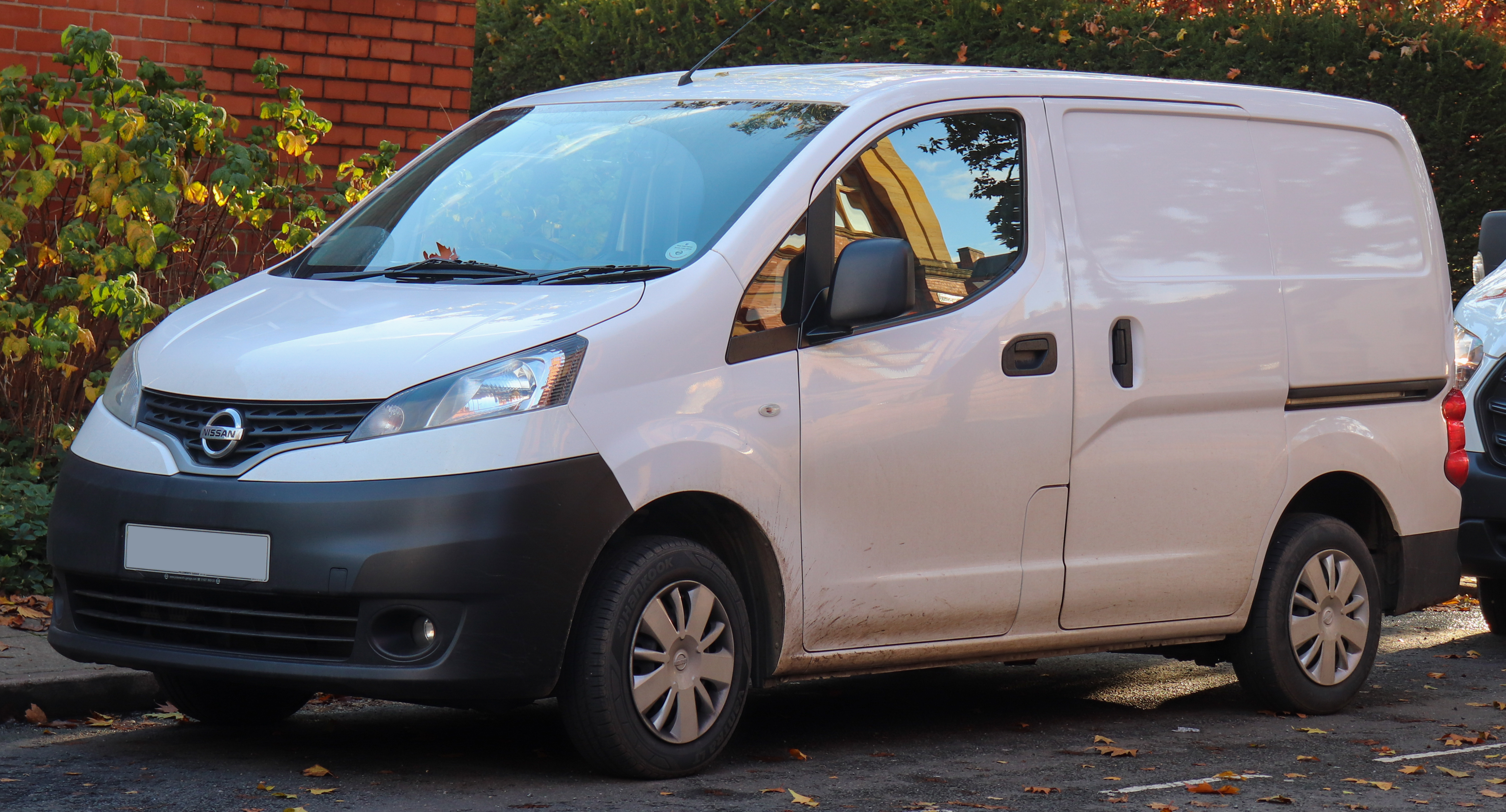
Nissan NV200 (Europe)

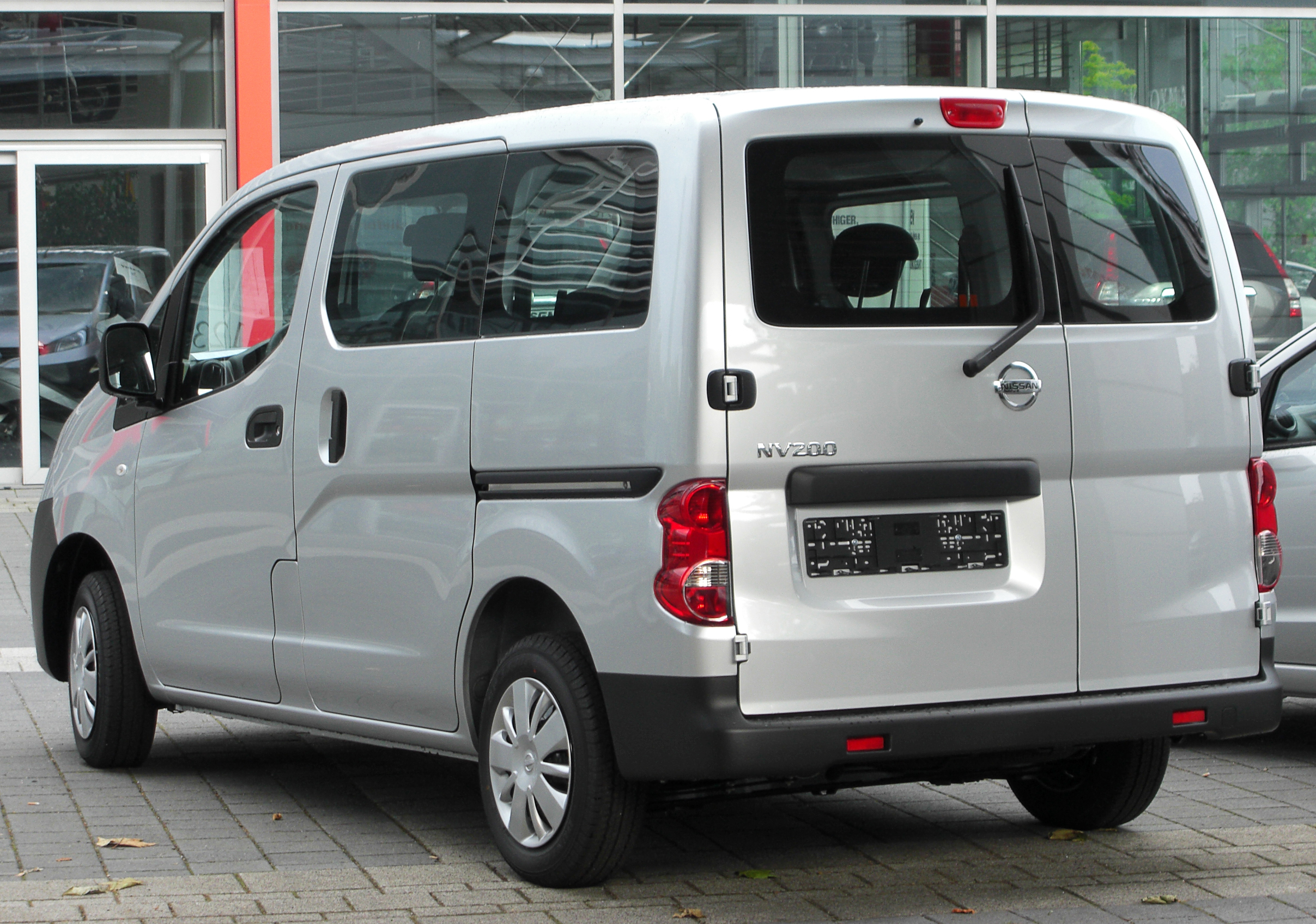
Nissan NV200 (Europe)

==== London taxi ====
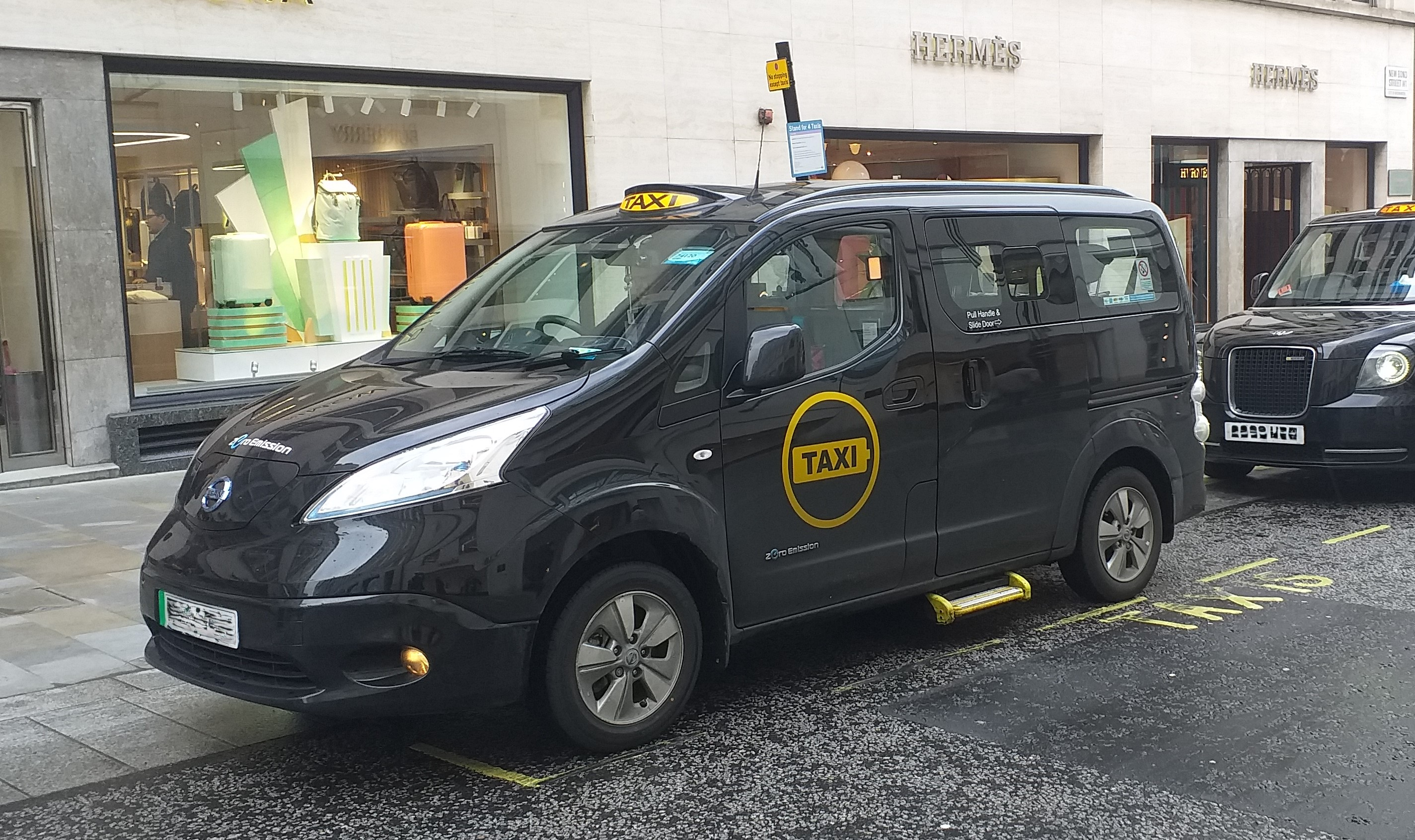
Nissan e-NV200 London Taxi

In 2011, Nissan approached both Transport for London (TfL) and the Licensed Taxi Drivers Association to adapt a version of the NV200 to the requirements of the streets of London. With experience from supplying engines to London Taxis International for their Coventry-built TX1, the NV200 London Taxi was developed in London by Nissan Design Europe at their offices in Paddington. The Coventry-based ADV Manufacturing Ltd was responsible for the engineering, development and final assembly of Nissan NV200 London Taxi.

The prototype vehicle, equipped with the standard Renault 1461cc (89/110PS) dCi (K9K) turbodiesel engine, 5-speed manual (89PS) or 6-speed manual (110PS) transmission was unveiled in London, followed by 2012 Paris Motor Show.

After feedback, and to meet new stricter European emissions legislation, Nissan offered production versions from January 2014 based on a 1.6-litre petrol engine and automatic transmission. The new Spanish-built NV200 London Taxi was launched in January 2014, to be followed by a battery-electric London Taxi based on the e-NV200 in 2015.

The entire London Taxi project was shelved later in 2014. A revised proposal was announced in 2017, which would come to fruition if the British Government approved electrification of the London Taxi network.

=== China ===
In China, the NV200 is built by Nissan in partnership with Dongfeng Motor, and was released in June 2010. Early models include HR16 DOHC (83 kW/150 Nm) engine. The Chinese market NV200 was refreshed in February 2014 with V-Motion grille, adding a new Luxury variant with redesigned three-bar grille, redesigned bumper and two-tone alloy wheels.

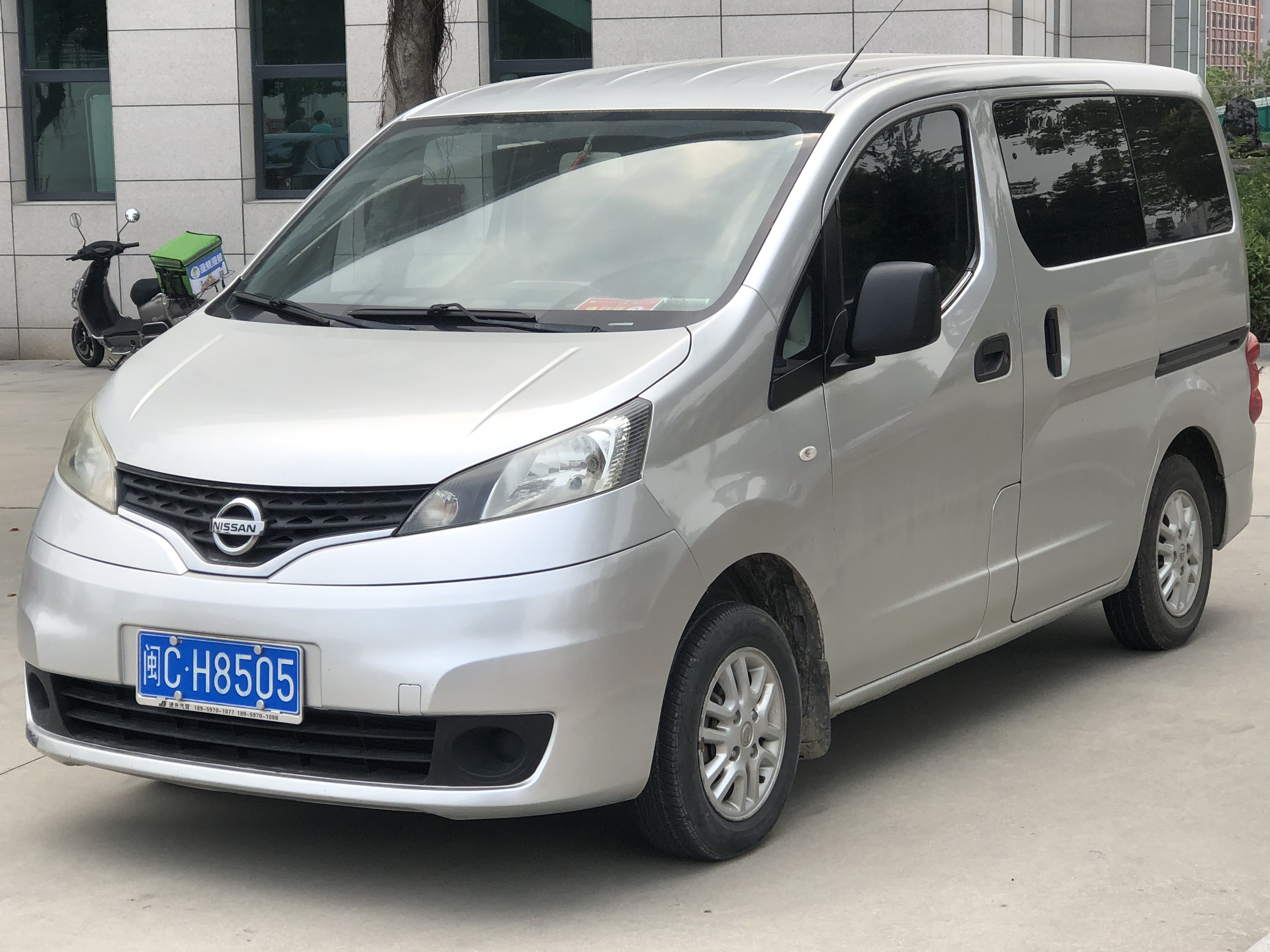
Nissan NV200 (China; pre-facelift)

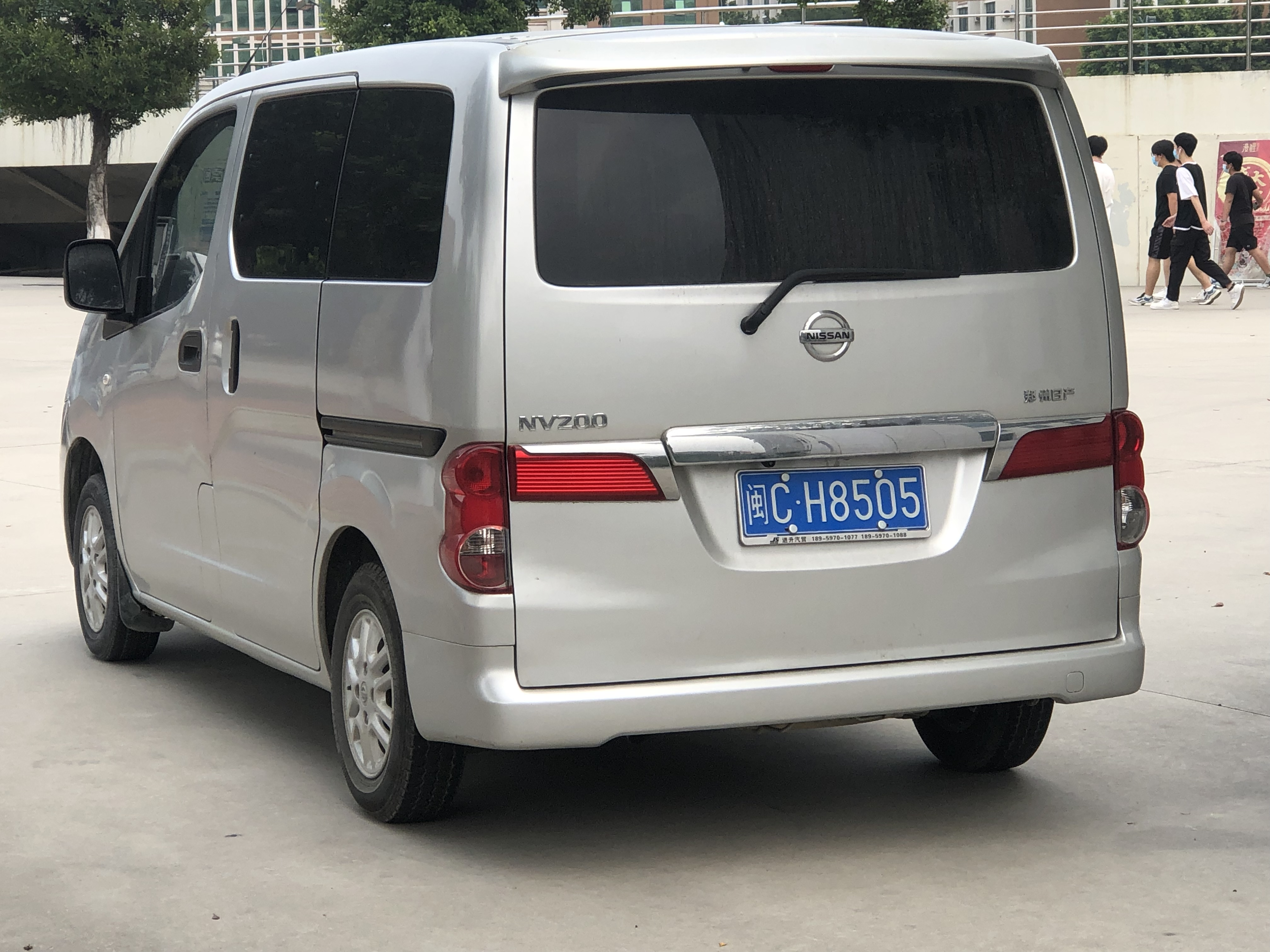
Nissan NV200 (China; pre-facelift)

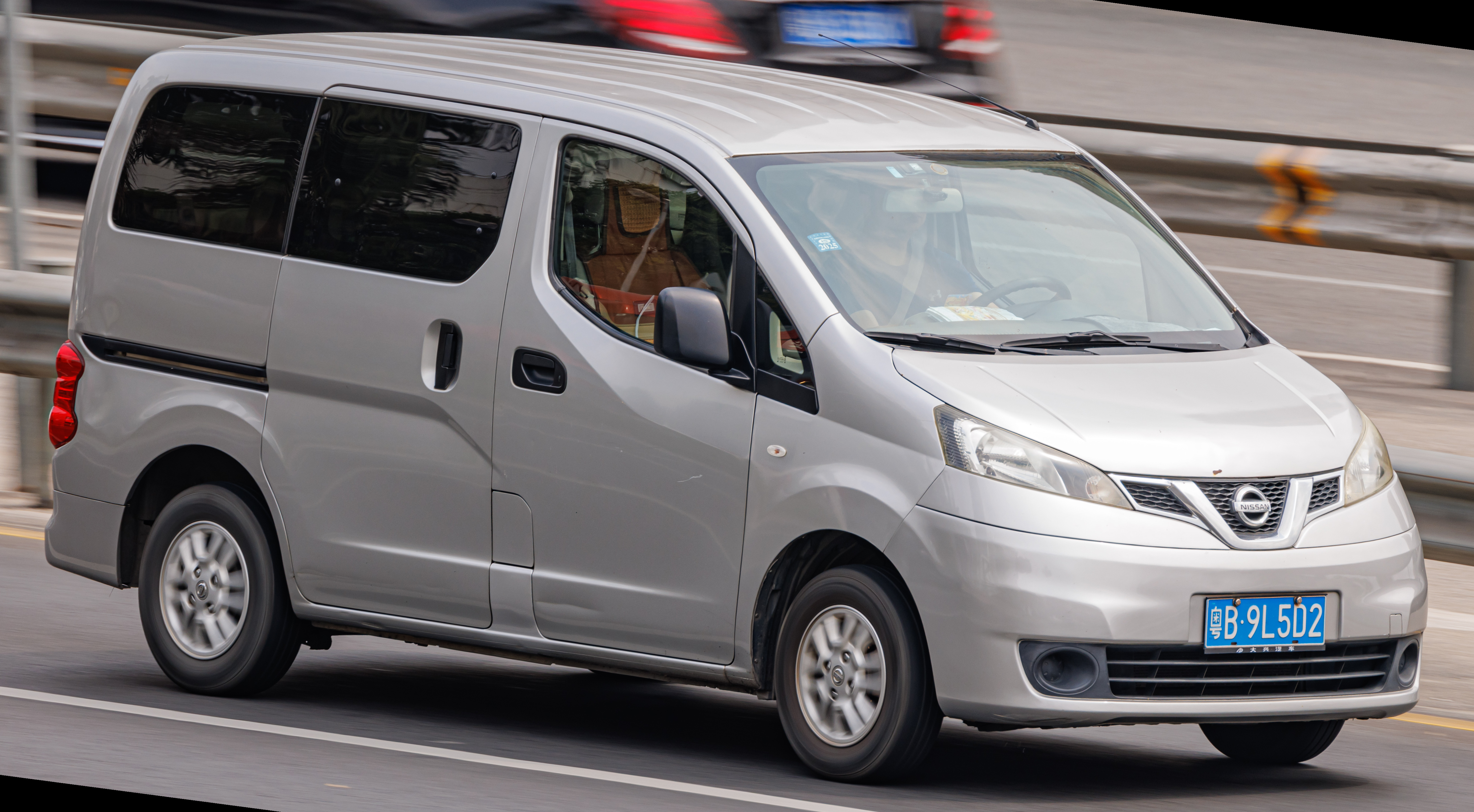
Nissan NV200 (China; facelift)

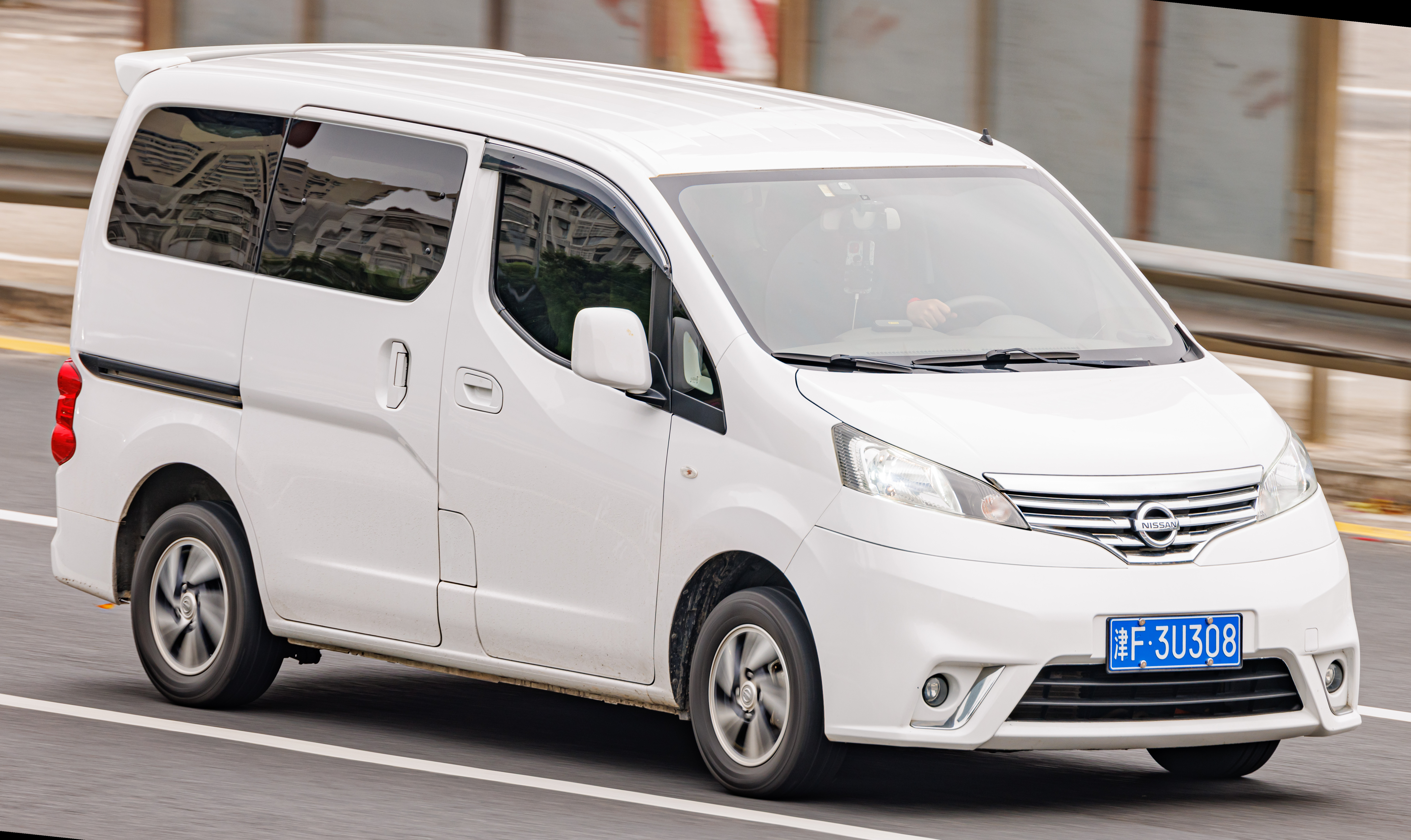
Nissan NV200 Luxury (China; facelift)

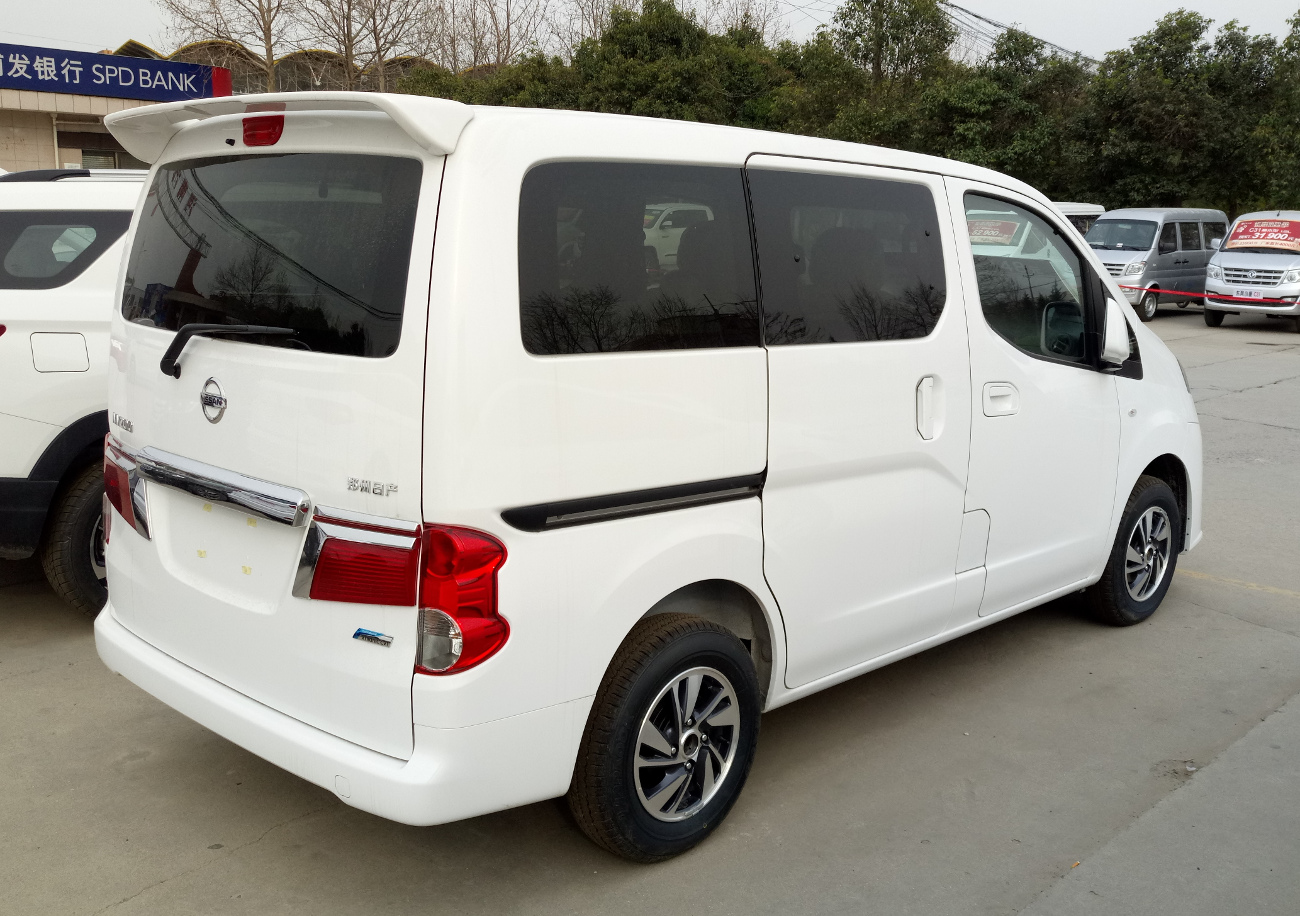
Nissan NV200 Luxury (China; facelift)

=== India ===
The Evalia was launched in India in September 2012. It was offered in a total of four variants: the base XE, XE Plus, XL and the top end XV with a 1.5-litre dCi diesel engine paired to a 5-speed manual transmission. In June 2015, Nissan stopped production of the vehicle due to low demand, with 2,412 units sold since its launch.

==== Ashok Leyland STiLE ====
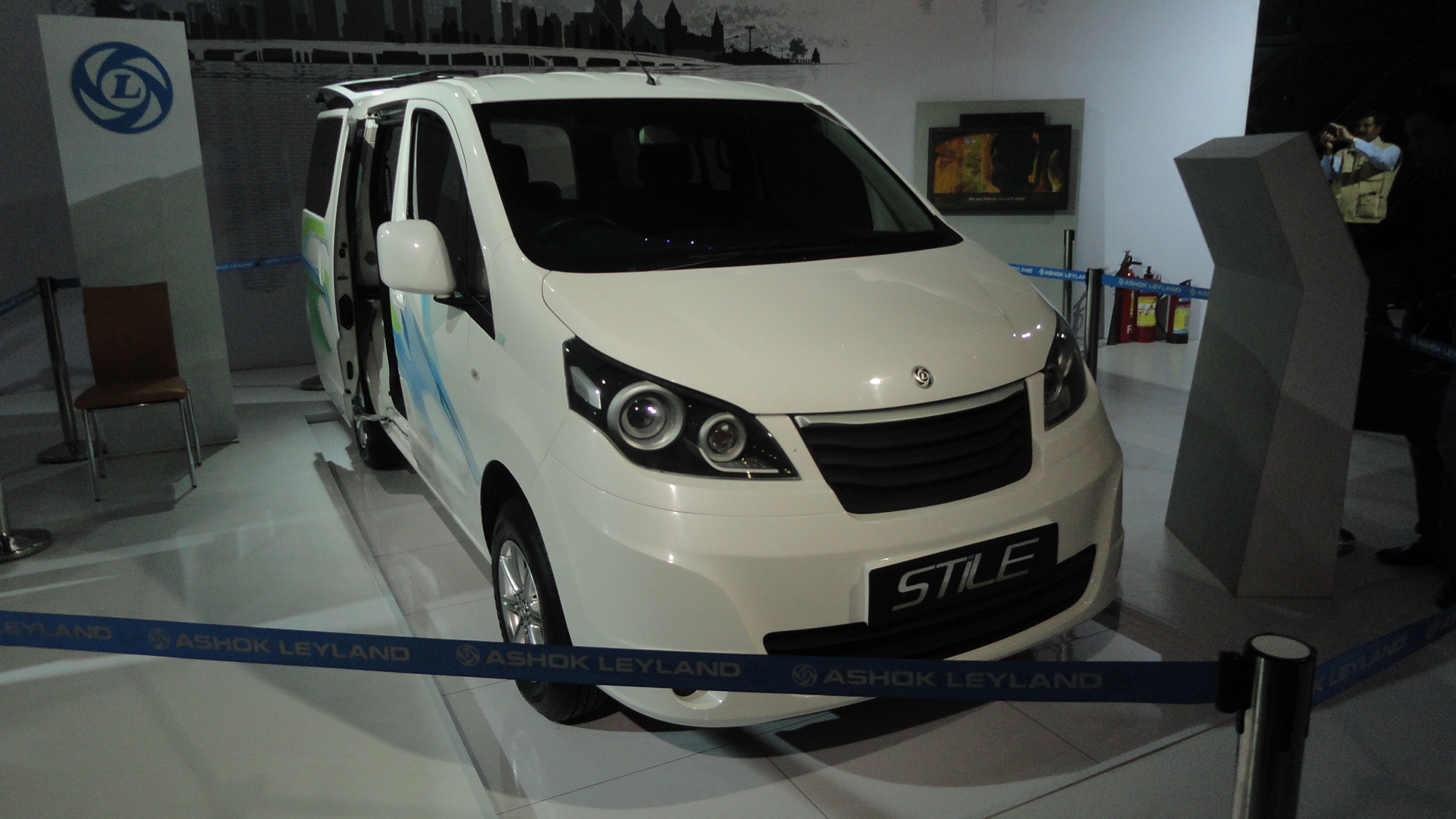
Ashok Leyland STiLE

A badge engineered version of the NV200 went on sale as the Ashok Leyland STiLE since September 2013. Early models included 1.5-litre K9K (86PS) engine, 5-speed manual transmission. It was withdrawn from sale during 2015 due to low sales.

=== Indonesia ===
The Evalia was launched in Indonesia on 7 June 2012. It was initially available in five grade levels: S, L, SV, XV, and L XV. The Evalia received an update on 23 January 2014 and is offered in three grade levels: St, SV and Highway Star. The Evalia was discontinued in the country in 2018, due to poor sales.

== Nissan e-NV200 ==
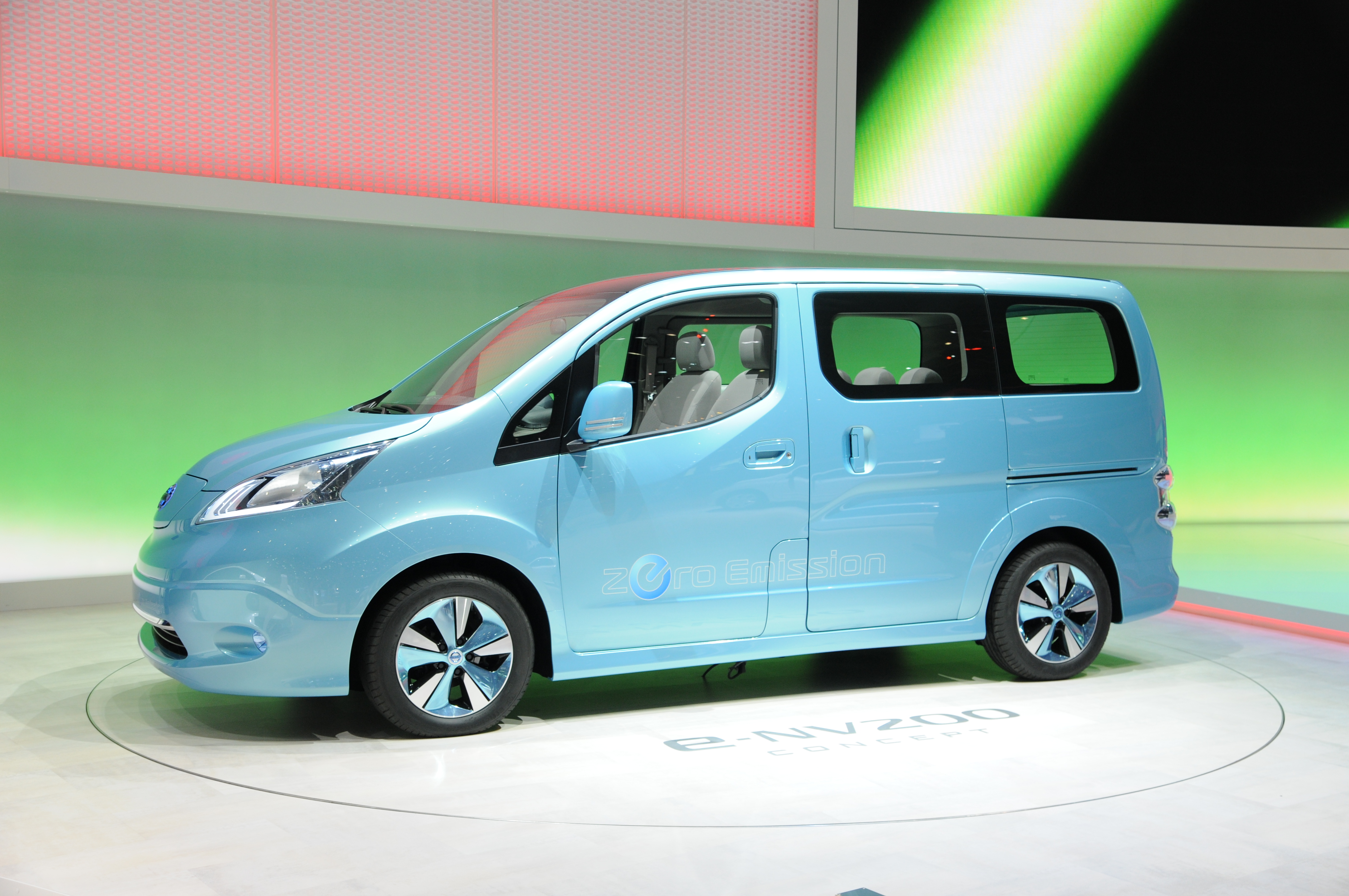
Nissan e-NV200 concept presented at the 2012 Geneva Motor Show.

The e-NV200 is the battery-electric version of the NV200 panel van. Nissan introduced the concept version of the e-NV200 at the 2012 North American International Auto Show in Detroit. The e-NV200 has a 24 kWh battery pack that was expected to have a range similar to Nissan Leaf of 73 mi (117 km).

Trials with a prototype were conducted with Japan Post Service beginning in July 2011, followed by trials with FedEx in London starting in December 2011, AEON Retail Co., Ltd., FedEx Express in Yokohama Area, Tochigi prefectural government in prefecture's rural areas from 3 September 2012.

More testing with a more advanced pre-production version, unveiled at the 64th IAA Commercial Vehicle International Motor Show in Hanover, took place in Singapore, the UK, the U.S. and Brazil, Coca-Cola Central Japan Co. starting in mid-November 2012, FedEx Express in Singapore, Saitama City, DHL Japan in Tokyo Metropolitan Area.

A more extensive 6-month trial with 28 units delivered to British Gas began in the UK in November 2013. The pre-production version of e-NV200 was unveiled at the 2013 Tokyo Motor Show.

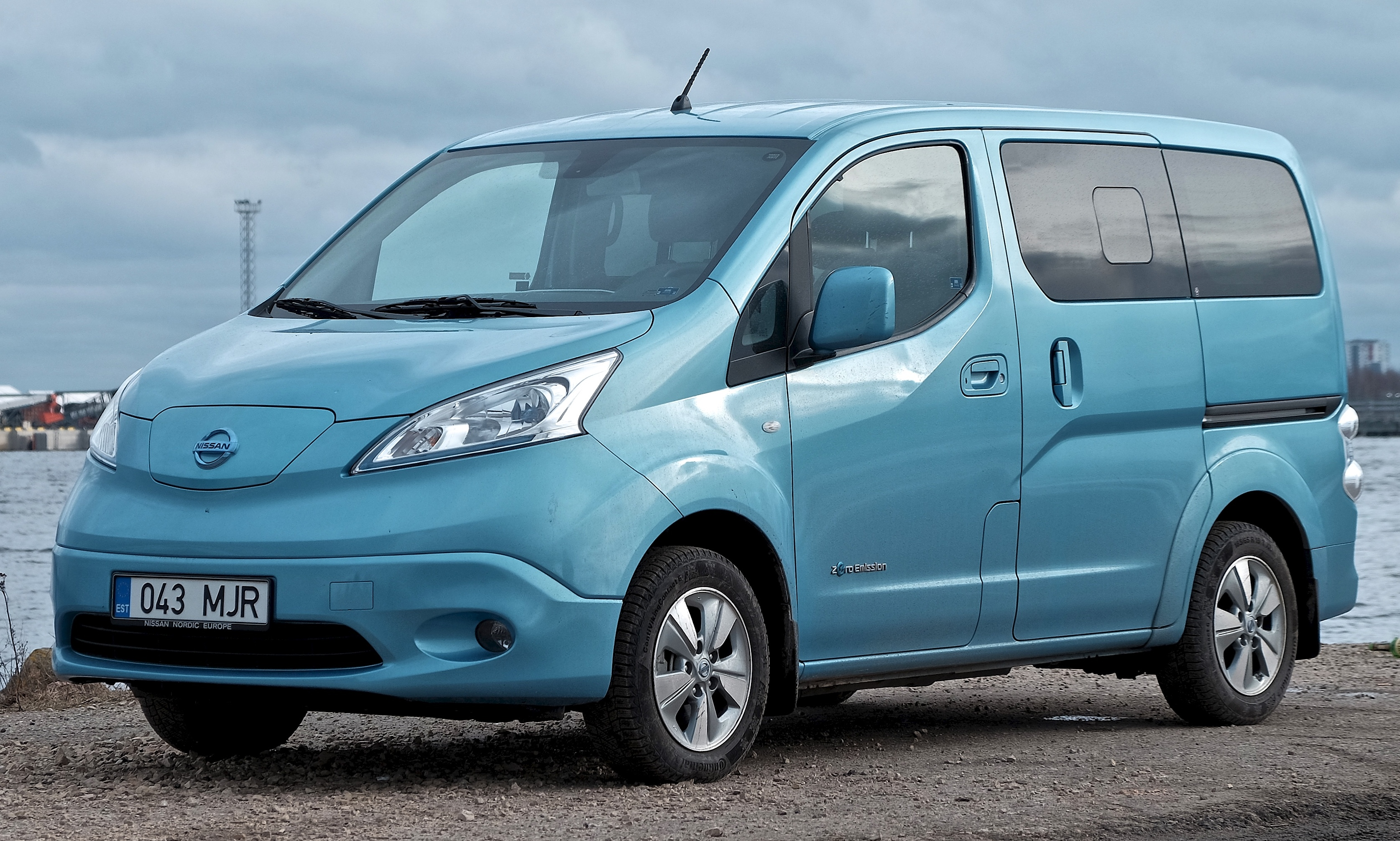
Nissan e-NV200

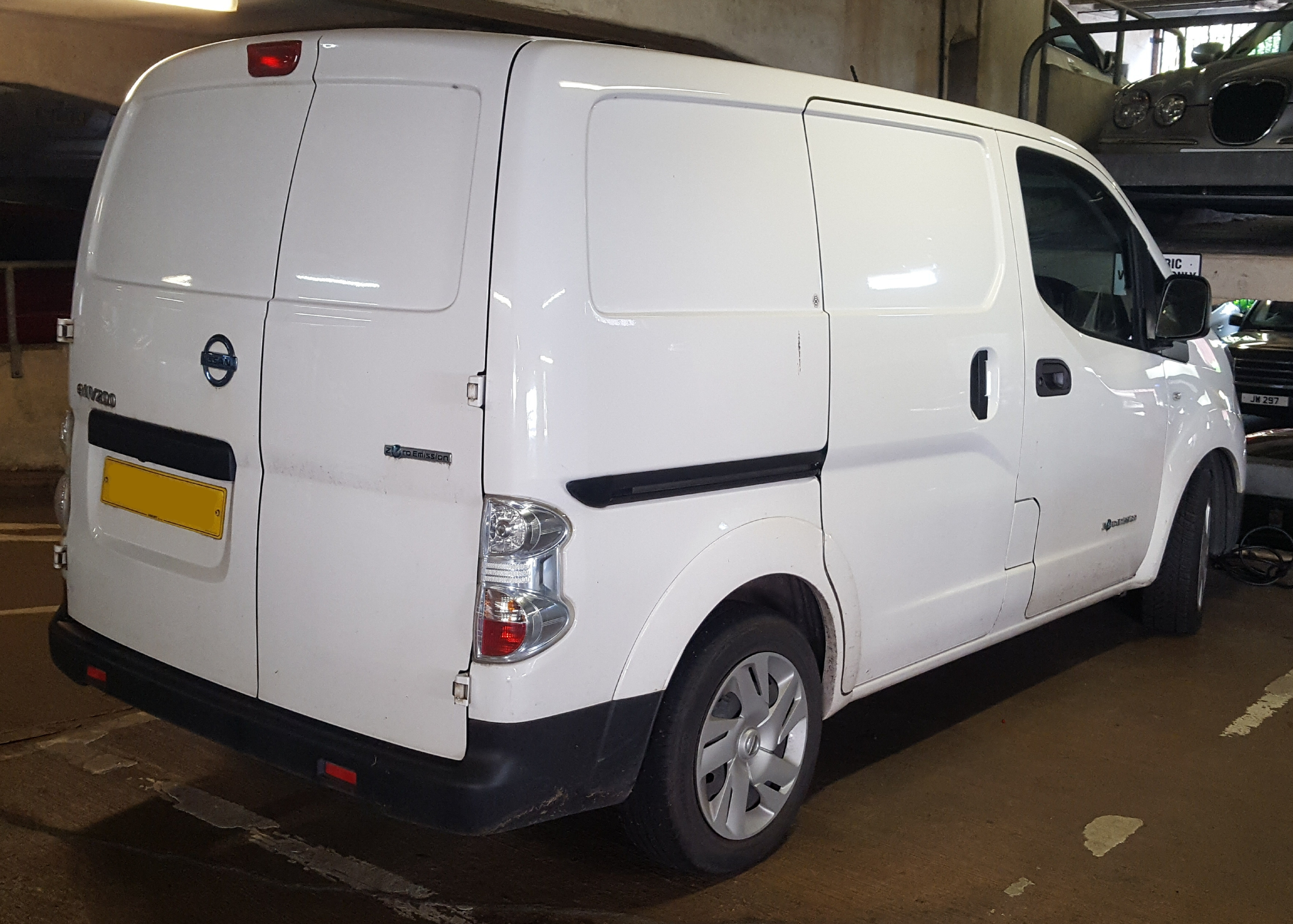
Nissan e-NV200

The production version of the e-NV200 was unveiled at the 2014 Geneva Motor Show. The production version of the e-NV200 has 30% of new components compared with the internal combustion NV200. Production of Nissan e-NV200 began at Nissan's plant in Barcelona, Spain, by mid-2014.

Launched in June 2013, the car was scheduled to go on sale in Europe in the same month and in Japan in October. Prices in Germany will start at €25,058 (~ US$28,055). The e-NV200 was the top selling electric commercial van in Europe in 2016 with 4,319 units delivered. A tall-roof variant was launched in 2020 as the e-NV200 XL Voltia, increasing cargo volume by 90%.

The Nissan e-NV200 was expected to be available by 2017 for the New York City's Taxi of Tomorrow fleet. However, structural changes would be required to bring the e-NV200 into compliance with US Federal Motor Vehicle Safety Standards, and the van never was released to the US market.

In 2021, Nissan unveiled the Townstar EV, which will replace the e-NV200. The Townstar EV is a rebadged Renault Kangoo E-Tech.

=== Specifications ===
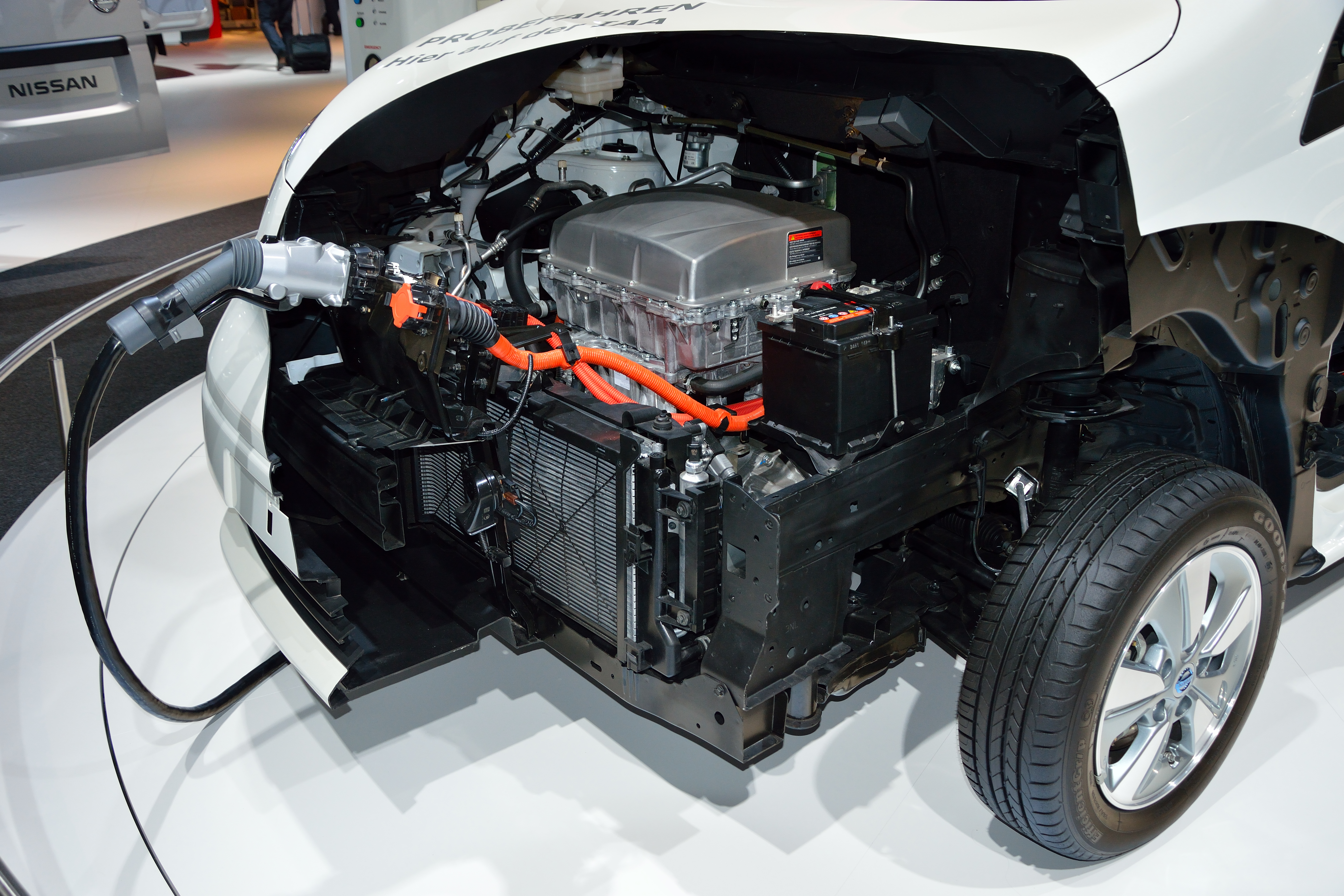
Cutaway of e-NV200 front, showing traction motor unit and vehicle charging inlet

As launched in 2014, the e-NV200 shared the same 80 kW (110 hp) / 254 N⋅m (187 lbf⋅ft) AC synchronous traction motor unit with the second-generation Leaf; the traction motor had been integrated as a unit with the battery control module and inverter. Although the lithium-ion battery had the same number of modules (48) and capacity (24 kW-hr) as the Nissan Leaf, it was repackaged physically to fit under the load floor and within the wheelbase, where it forms part of the structural frame, boosting rigidity compared to the conventionally-powered NV200. The 24 kW-hr battery fitted to the e-NV up to the 2017 model year is capable of delivering an all-electric range of 170 km (110 mi) under the New European Driving Cycle (NEDC). Cells are manufactured in the UK (at Sunderland) and shipped to Barcelona, where they are assembled. The standard on-board charger has a maximum input capacity of 3.3 kW (AC), doubling to 6.6 kW with an optional charger which also adds a CHAdeMO port that accepts up to 50 kW (DC). Maximum speed is 120 km/h (75 mph), reduced to 100 km/h (62 mph) when battery charge is low to maximise range.

In 2018, the battery capacity was increased by 67%, to 40 kWh, with a correspondingly extended driving range of 300 km (190 mi) under the Japanese (JC08) driving cycle.

The e-NV200 has a cargo capacity of 4.2 m^{3} (150 cu ft) and can carry two Euro pallets; both sides are equipped with sliding doors and the rear is equipped with swinging doors for cargo access. Interior cargo length is 2.04 m (80 in) long to the front bulkhead and 1.22 m (48 in) wide between the wheel arches, with a lift-in height of 524 mm (20.6 in) from the ground and a maximum capacity of 770 kg (1,700 lb).

Compared to the conventional NV200, the e-NV200 is approximately 160 mm (6.3 in) longer with revised styling that incorporates a charging port door in the center of the front end. Overall width increases by 60 mm (2.4 in) to 1,755 mm (69.1 in) as the wheel arches were flared to accommodate the Leaf's front subframe. The front suspension is identical to the Leaf, using MacPherson struts, and the rear suspension is taken from the conventional NV200, using leaf springs and a beam axle.

=== Nissan e-NV200 London Taxi/Dynamo Taxi ===
In 2019, a few months after the plug-in hybrid LEVC TX went on sale, the e-NV200 based Dynamo Taxi was launched by a firm also based in Coventry, UK. The Dynamo Taxi became the first 'black cab' on the streets of London to be fully electric since the Bersey Taxi in 1897 and is based on the Evalia version of the van.

In 2022, the Dynamo Motor Company had to phase out the Dynamo Taxi, after Nissan replaced the Nissan e-NV200 Evalia with the Renault Kangoo E-Tech-based Townstar EV, leaving the LEVC TX as the only electric taxi available to London cabbies.

== Chevrolet City Express ==
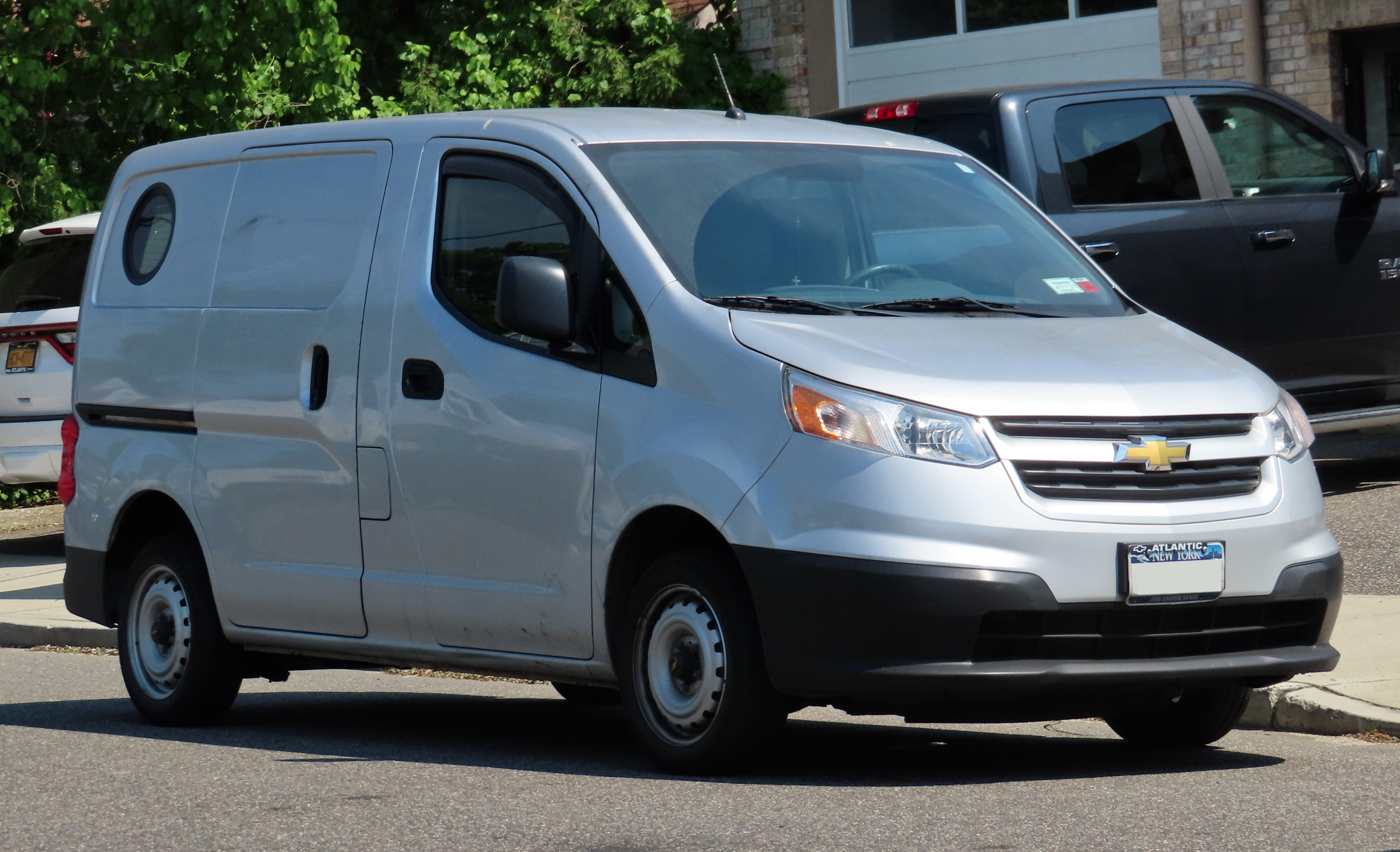
2015 Chevrolet City Express LS (US)

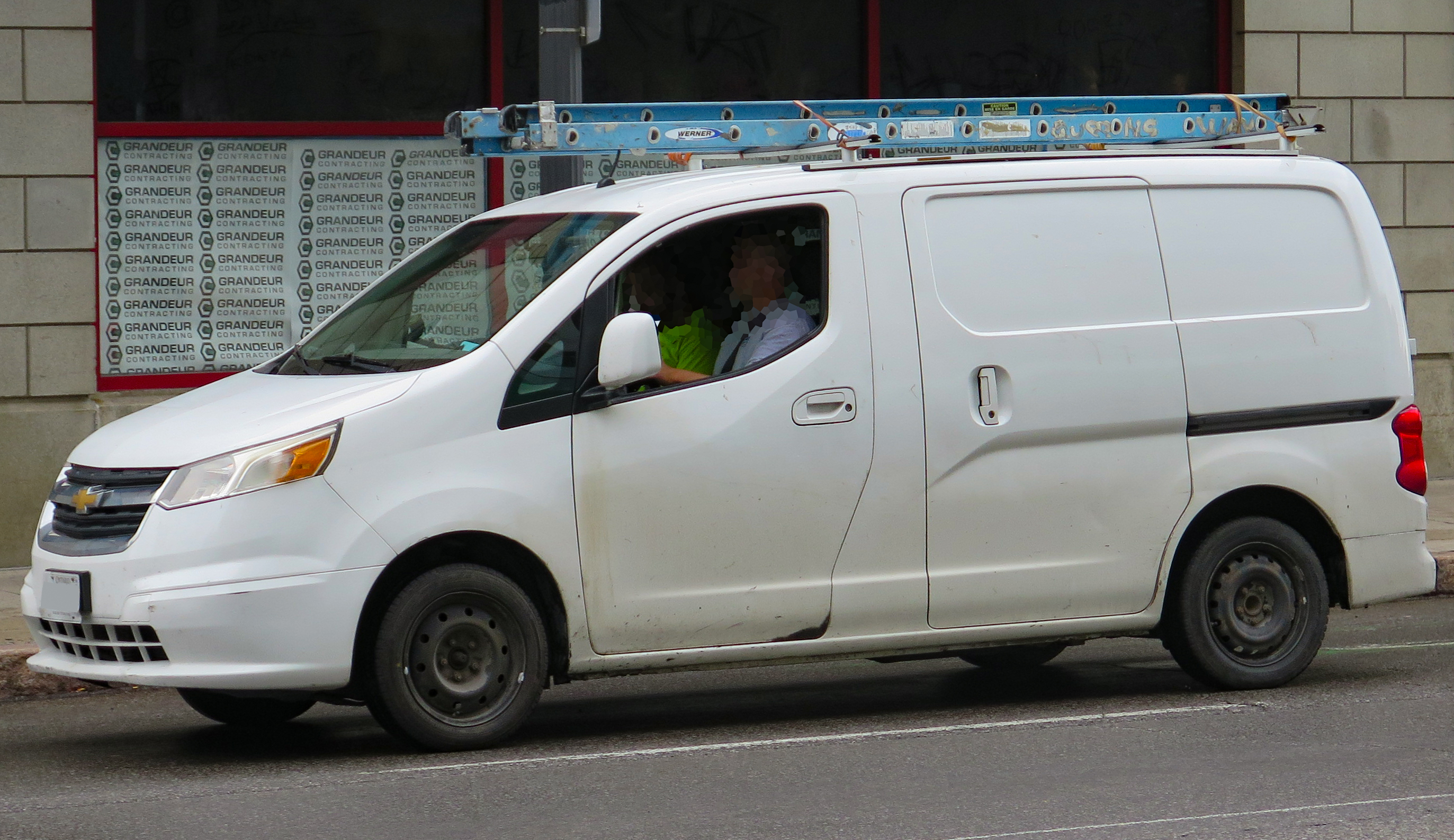
2015 Chevrolet City Express LS (Canada)

The Chevrolet City Express is a badge engineered Nissan NV200 for the United States and Canadian markets marketed by Chevrolet. Chevrolet targeted the vehicle toward urban business owners as a cheaper and more compact option next to the full-sized Express van. The City Express came in two level trims (LS and LT), a fold-down passenger seat, 40/60-split rear cargo doors that open to 90- and 180-degree angles, left- and right-side sliding doors, twenty integrated cargo-mounting points throughout the interior, six floor-mounted D-rings, and a center storage console. The LT trim included a 5.8 in (150 mm) diagonal touch screen, navigation, Sirius XM Radio, and Bluetooth connectivity as part of their technology package. The latter was also available as an option for the LS trim. The Chevrolet City Express was never marketed as a GMC.

The vehicle made its debut at the 2014 Chicago Auto Show and went on sale in the fall of 2014.

Citing lackluster sales and non-compatibility with GM parts, Chevrolet discontinued sales of the City Express in 2018 and informed dealers to immediately stop taking orders.

== Safety ==
The NV200 Combi received a three-star Euro NCAP score in May 2013. Euro NCAP commented of the adult occupant: "When the car was inspected after the frontal impact test, it was found that the floor panel had torn away from the base of the A pillar and numerous spot welds had released between the floor and sill...the main body of the sill was found to be bent inwards. The passenger compartment was judged to be unstable and the car was penalized. Similarly, the driver's footwell was found to have ruptured and was unstable and a further penalty was applied."

== Awards ==
In April 2010, it was named the Professional Van and Light Truck Magazine International Van of the Year 2010.

The Nissan was announced as the winner of New York City's Taxi of Tomorrow, beating finalists Karsan V-1 and Ford Transit Connect. Nissan was awarded a 10-year contract to provide the city exclusively with some 13,000 yellow cabs, starting in 2013. The European version with the 1.5L Diesel four-cylinder gets 54.4 averaged mpg (44 miles per US gallon); however, the American version will obtain fewer miles per gallon.

== Sales ==
As of 30 August 2013, sales of the Nissan NV200 reached 170,000 units.

Year	Europe (passenger)	U.S.	Canada	China
2009	38			
2010	2,265			11,670
2011	4,702			15,406
2012	6,366			14,958
2013	5,370	4,031	598	17,639
2014	5,434	13,385	1,275	18,474
2015	6,288	17,317	1,343	9,403
2016	7,122	18,523	1,651	10,460
2017	6,945	18,602	1,748	8,879
2018	4,858	18,628	1,700	9,181
2019	3,317	18,768	1,783	4,117
2020	1,792	17,126	1,930	25
2021	1,226	17,359	2,872	
