= Tata Curvv EV =

Electric subcompact crossover SUV manufactured by Tata Motors

Overview
- Manufacturer: Tata Motors
- Production: 2024–present
- Assembly: India

Body and chassis
- Class: Subcompact crossover SUV
- Body style: 5-door crossover SUV
- Layout: Front-motor, front-wheel drive
- Platform: Tata Gen 2 EV
- Related: Tata Curvv; Tata Nexon EV

Powertrain
- Electric motor: Permanent magnet synchronous
- Transmission: Single-speed
- Battery: 45 kWh LFP Octillion/Gotion; 55 kWh LFP Octillion/Eve Energy
- Electric range: 502–585 km (312–364 mi) (ARAI)
- Plug-in charging: 70 kW DC, 7.2 kW AC

Dimensions
- Wheelbase: 2,560 mm (101 in)
- Length: 4,310 mm (170 in)
- Width: 1,810 mm (71 in)
- Height: 1,637 mm (64.4 in)

The Tata Curvv EV (alternately spelled Curvv.ev) is a battery electric subcompact crossover SUV manufactured by Tata Motors. Introduced in 2024, it is the first model under the Curvv nameplate and was launched as an electric vehicle prior to its ICE counterpart. The vehicle is positioned in the mid-size SUV segment and is based on Tata's Generation 2 EV platform.

== Overview ==
The Tata Curvv EV adopts a coupe-style design with a sloping roofline and is positioned between the Tata Nexon EV and the Tata Harrier in Tata Motors' lineup. It is classified as a compact crossover SUV and is intended to compete with other electric SUVs such as the MG ZS EV, BYD Atto 3, Mahindra XUV400, and the forthcoming Hyundai Creta EV.

As of 2025, the Curvv EV is available in five variants: Smart, Pure, Creative, Accomplished, and Empowered. In April 2025, a Dark Edition was introduced based on the Empowered Plus variant, featuring cosmetic changes.

The Curvv EV measures 4,308 mm (170 in) in length and has a ground clearance of 190 mm (7 in). It offers 500 litres (18 cu ft) of rear cargo capacity and includes a front storage compartment. The vehicle's structure incorporates high-strength and advanced high-strength steel.

The interior features a 10.25-inch digital instrument cluster, a central 12.3-inch touchscreen infotainment system with wireless Android Auto and Apple CarPlay compatibility. A 9-speaker JBL audio system, panoramic sunroof, and ambient lighting are optional on higher variants.

The Curvv EV is equipped with six airbags, an electronic stability program (ESP), all-wheel disc brakes, and a 360-degree camera. It also includes Level 2 ADAS features, hill-hold assist, and a pedestrian acoustic alert system. The model has received a 5-star safety rating from the Bharat NCAP.

== Powertrain ==
The model is available with two battery options: a 45 kWh battery paired with a 150 PS (110 kW; 148 hp) motor, or a 55 kWh battery paired with a 167 PS (123 kW; 165 hp) motor. Both variants produce 215 N⋅m (159 lb⋅ft) of torque and use a single motor in a front-wheel-drive configuration. Tata Motors states that the Curvv EV can accelerate from 0 to 100 km/h (62 mph) in 8.6 seconds, with a top speed of 160 km/h (99 mph). The ARAI-certified driving range is 502 km (312 mi) for the 45 kWh variant, and 585 km (364 mi) for the 55 kWh variant.

The standard battery option is a 45 kWh pack made by Octillion Power Solutions, using cylindrical 15.2 Ah LFP battery cells supplied by Eve Energy. The larger 55 kWh pack is made by Tata AutoComp Systems, using prismatic 105 Ah LFP battery cells supplied by Gotion.

The Curvv EV is capable of 70 kW peak DC fast charging, allowing it to charge from 10% to 80% in approximately 40 minutes, or 150 km (93 mi) in 15 minutes. It is also capable of 7.2 kW AC charging, taking around 7.9 hours for a full charge (10% to 100%).

Specifications
Variant	Battery		Power	Torque	Range
Variant	Type	Supplier	Power	Torque	ARAI
Standard	45 kWh LFP	Octillion/Eve Energy	150 PS (110 kW; 148 hp)	215 N⋅m (159 lb⋅ft)	502 km (312 mi)
Long range	55 kWh LFP	Tata/Gotion	167 PS (123 kW; 165 hp)	215 N⋅m (159 lb⋅ft)	585 km (364 mi)

== Safety ==
Bharat NCAP test results Tata Curvv.ev (2024, based on Latin NCAP 2016)
Test	Score	Stars
Adult occupant protection	30.81/32.00	5 /5 stars
Child occupant protection	44.83/49.00	5 /5 stars

== Sales ==
In March 2025, Tata Motors reported sales of over 3,500 units of the Curvv model (ICE and EV sales combined). In April 2025, combined sales declined to 3,149 units. Sales figures for the electric version alone have not been disclosed as of mid-2025.

=== Markets ===
The Tata Curvv EV is available on the Government e-Marketplace (GeM) platform and has been included in the vehicle fleet of the Rashtrapati Bhavan.

In June 2025, the Curvv EV was introduced in Sri Lanka through Tata's partnership with Diesel & Motor Engineering (DIMO).

== See also ==
- Electric vehicle industry in India
- Tata Motors
- Tata Harrier EV
- Tata Nexon EV
- List of electric cars currently available
- Plug-in electric vehicles in India
