= Dimo =

Dimo may refer to:

- Dimo (name)
- Dimo, South Sudan, a village
- Dimo, an alternative name for Dimu, Syria, a village
- Di mo, a membrane applied to the transverse Chinese flute
- Diesel & Motor Engineering, a Sri Lankan conglomerate commonly abbreviated as DIMO

== See also ==
- DYMO Corporation
