= Tata Motors Passenger Vehicles =

Indian automobile manufacturer

Tata Motors Passenger Vehicles Limited
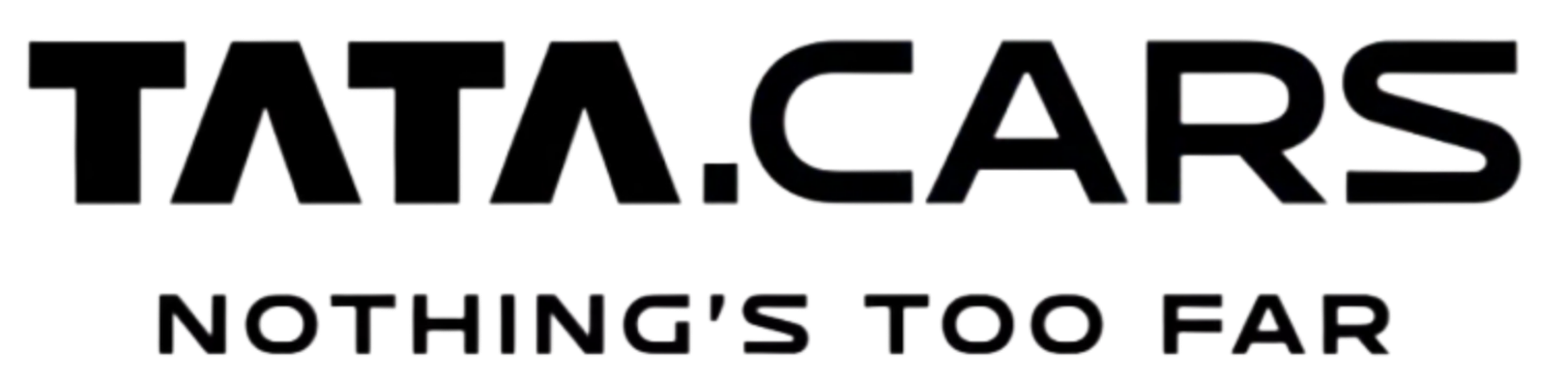
- Trade name: TATA.CARS
- Formerly: Tata Locomotive and Engineering Company Limited (1945–1960); Tata Engineering and Locomotive Company Limited (1960-2003); Tata Motors Limited (2003–2025)
- Type: Public
- Traded as: NSE: TMPV; BSE: 500570; NSE NIFTY 50 constituent
- ISIN: INE155A01022
- Industry: Automotive
- Founded: 1 September 1945; 81 years ago
- Founder: JRD Tata
- Headquarters: Mumbai, Maharashtra, India
- Area served: Worldwide
- Key people: N. Chandrasekaran (chairman); Shailesh Chandra (CEO); PB Balaji (CFO)
- Products: Cars; SUVs; Electric vehicles
- Brands: Avinya
- Services: Vehicle servicing; Auto financing
- Revenue: ▲₹376,825 crore (US$39 billion) (2026)
- Operating income: ▲₹31,240 crore (US$3.2 billion) (2026)
- Net income: ▼₹24,850 crore (US$2.6 billion) (2026)
- Total assets: ▲₹392,410 crore (US$41 billion) (2026)
- Total equity: ▲₹129,650 crore (US$13 billion) (2026)
- Number of employees: 52,480 (2026)
- Parent: Tata Group
- Subsidiaries: Jaguar Land Rover; Tata Technologies
- Website: tata.cars
- Footnotes; Financials as of 31 March 2025.

Tata Motors Passenger Vehicles Limited, doing business as Tata Cars (stylized as TATA.CARS) is an Indian multinational automobile manufacturer, based in Mumbai. It is a part of Tata Group. As of 2025, it is the third largest car manufacturer in India by sales, after Maruti Suzuki and Mahindra Automotive and above Hyundai. It owns British car manufacturer Jaguar Land Rover.

== History ==
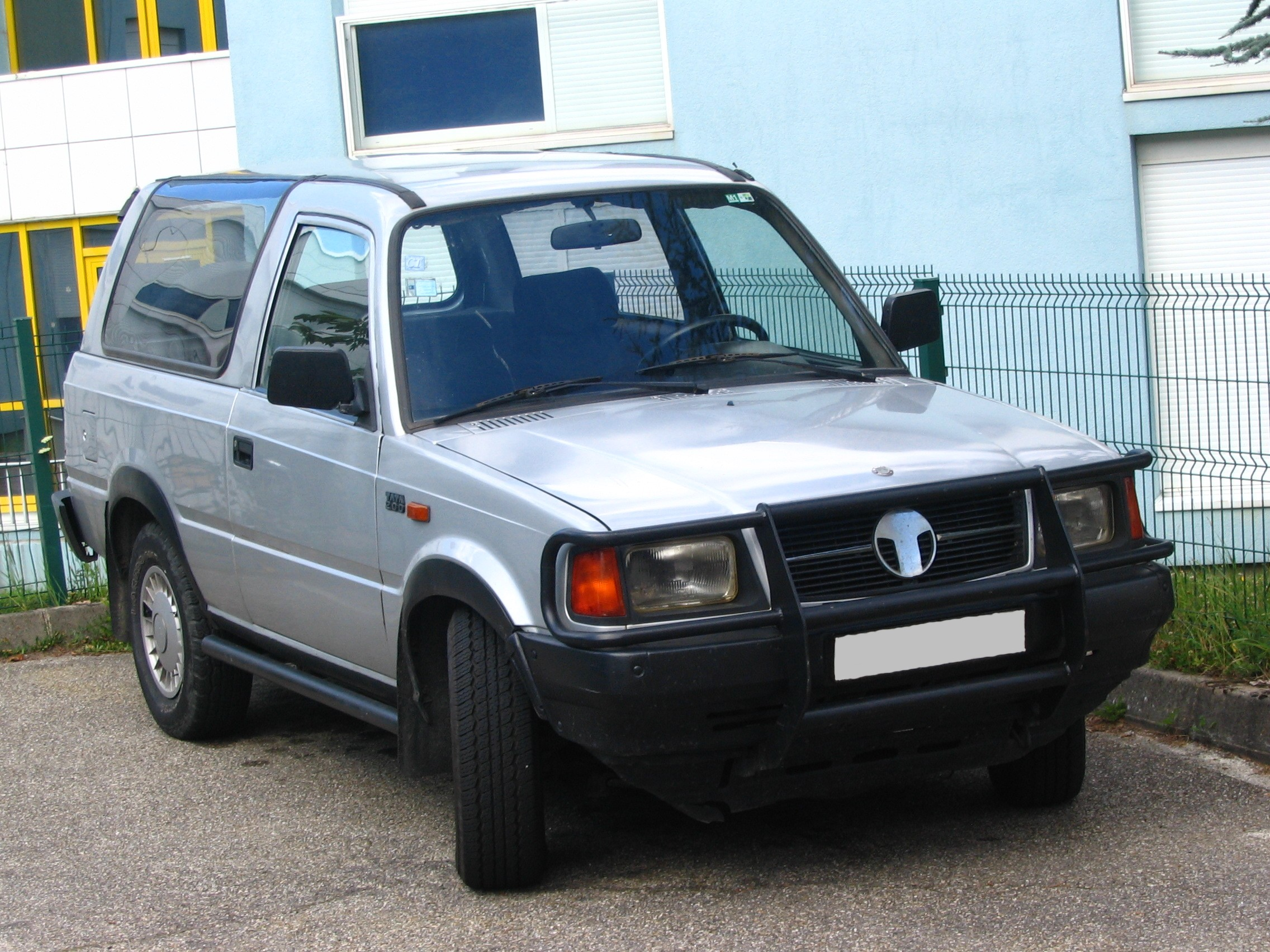
Tata Sierra (1991-2000)

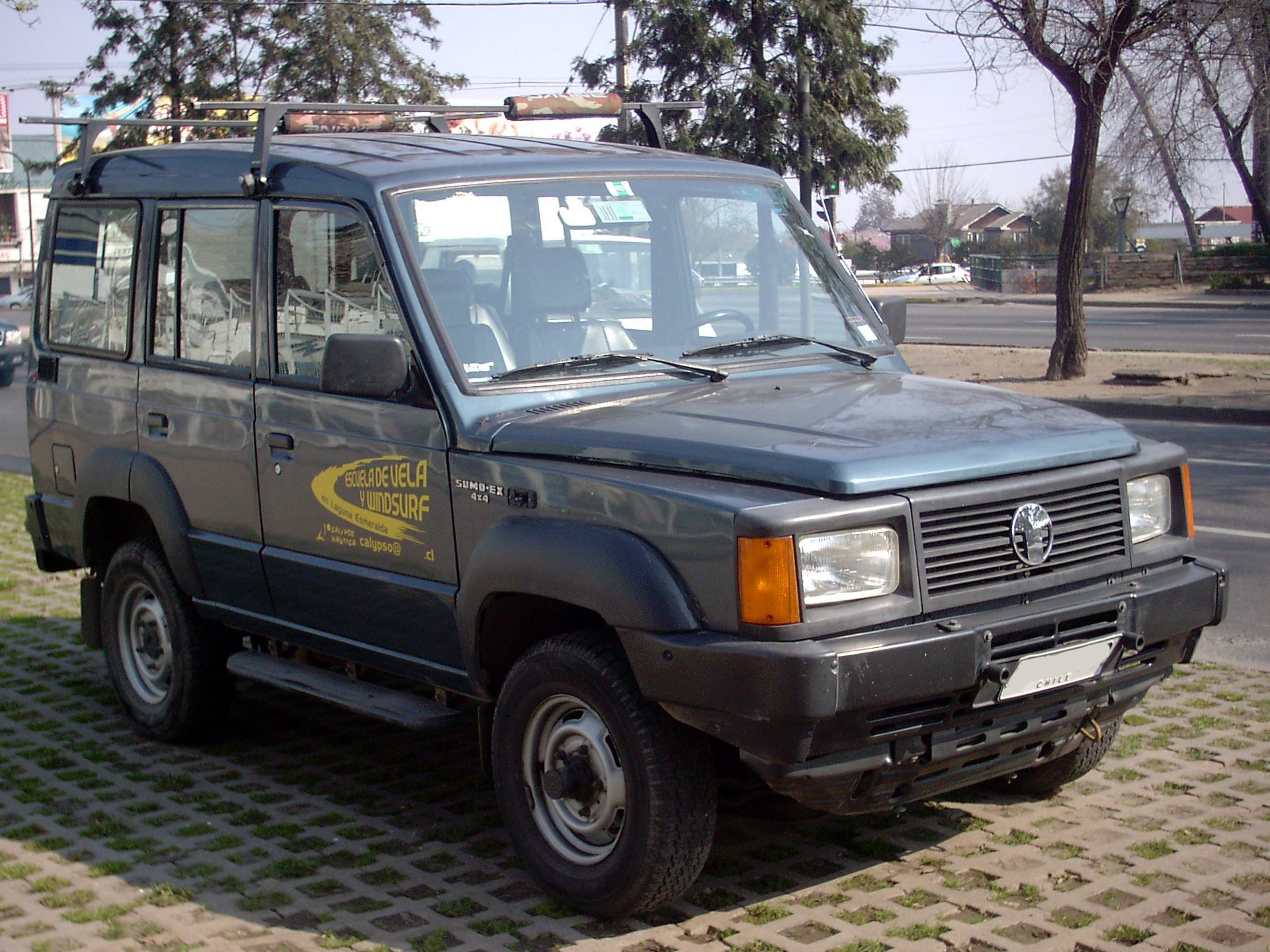
Tata Sumo (1994–2019)

Tata Motors was founded in 1945, as a locomotive manufacturer. Tata Motors entered the passenger vehicle market in 1991 with the launch of the Tata Sierra, a multi utility vehicle. This was followed by the launch of the Tata Estate in 1992 (a stationwagon based on the existing TataMobile light commercial vehicle) and the Tata Sumo in 1994, India's first sports utility vehicle.

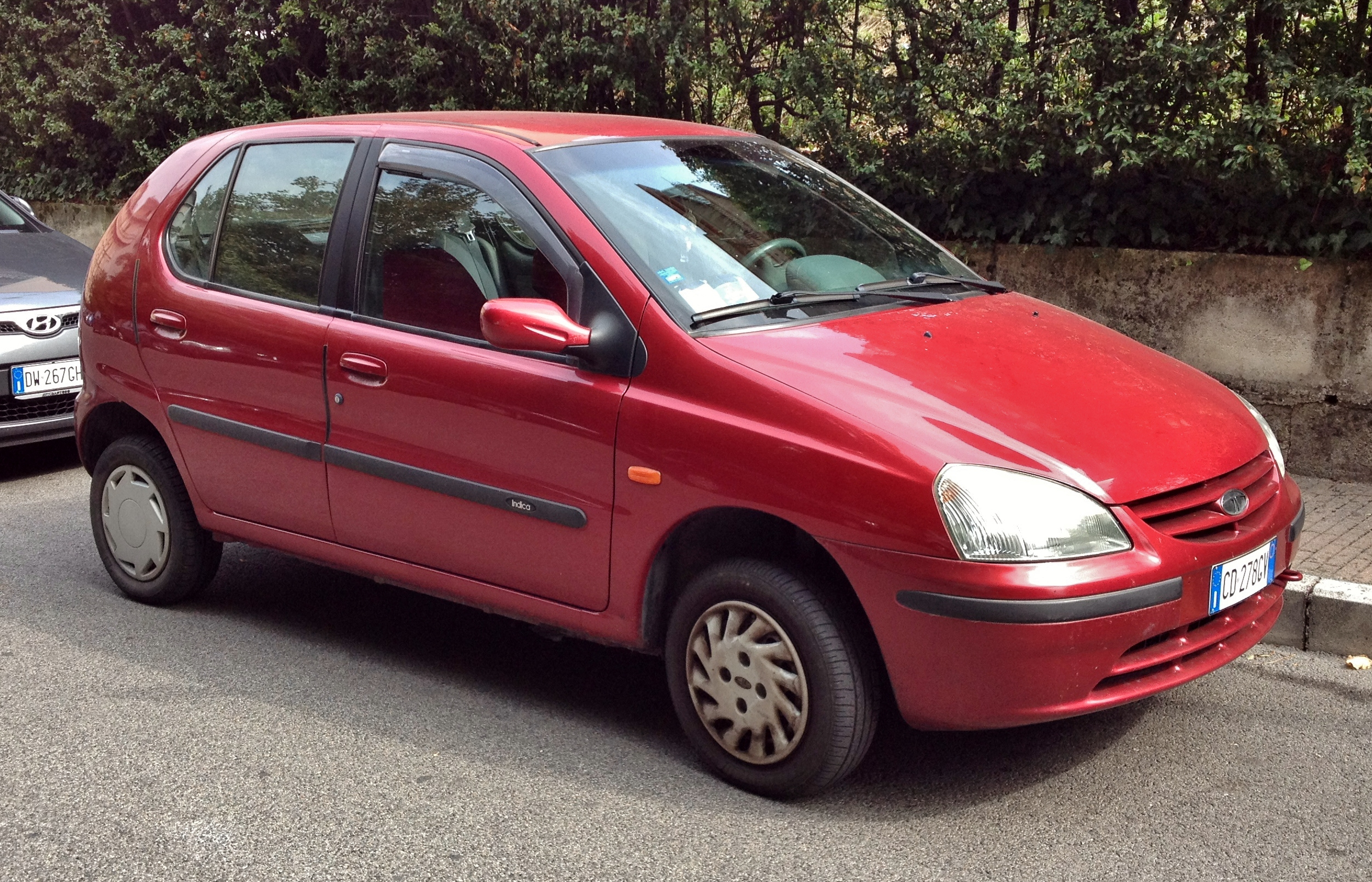
Tata Indica (first generation)

Tata launched the Indica in 1998, the first fully indigenous Indian passenger car. Although initially criticised by auto-analysts, its fuel economy, engine and an aggressive marketing strategy made it one of the best selling cars in the history of the Indian automobile industry. A newer version of the car, named Indica V2, was introduced later. Tata Motors also exported the car to South Africa.

In 1999, Tata Motors entered talks to sell its struggling passenger car business, and Ford emerged as a potential buyer. However, after meeting Ford chairperson Bill Ford in Detroit, Ratan Tata decided not to sell the business.

In 2002, Tata Motors launched the Tata Indigo sedan series based on the Indica platform. The one-millionth car from the Indica platform was manufactured at the Pune plant in 2007.

Later in 2008, during the Great Recession, Ford verged on bankruptcy. Tata offered to buy their Jaguar Land Rover (JLR) for $2.3 billion. Bill Ford reportedly thanked Tata by saying "You are doing us a big favour by buying JLR."

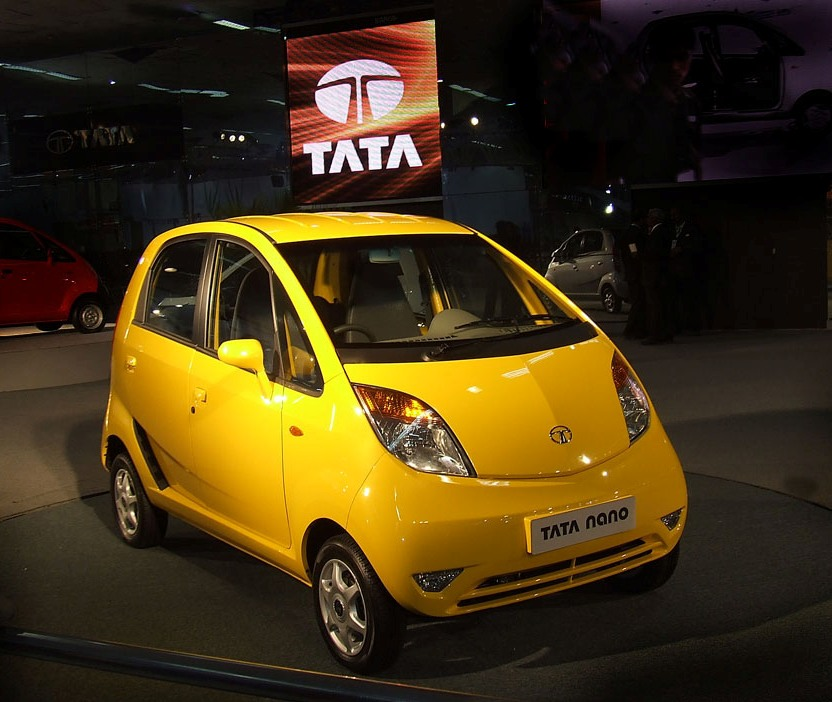
Tata Nano

In January 2008, Tata Motors launched Tata Nano, the least expensive production car in the world at about ₹120,000 (US$3,000). The city car was unveiled during the Auto Expo 2008 exhibition in Pragati Maidan, New Delhi.

Tata faced controversy over developing the Nano, as environmentalists like Anumita Roychoudhury of the Centre for Science and Environment in Delhi and Rajendra K. Pachauri, the chairperson of the Intergovernmental Panel on Climate Change (IPCC), raised concerns over the launch of such a low-priced car which could lead to mass motorization in India, leading to an increase in pollution and accelerate climate change. Tata had set up a factory in Sanand, Gujarat, and the first Nanos were rolled out in the summer of 2009.

At the 12th Auto Expo in February 2014, Tata Motors unveiled The Bolt, a hatchback and The Zest, a compact sedan.

In 2015, Tata Motors Cars entered the Southeast Asian market by expanding into Vietnam and the Philippines.

Tata Motors increased its utility vehicle market share to over 8% in FY2019.

On 12 October 2021, private equity firm TPG invested $1 billion in Tata Motors' electric vehicle subsidiary.

In May 2022, Tata Motors acquired Ford India's Sanand manufacturing plant.

In 2024, Tata Motors announced the demerger of its commercial vehicles business. The demerger was completed in October 2025.

In August 2026, Tata Motors Passenger Vehicles announced Tata.Cars as the new consumer-facing identity for its business, being used on dealerships, service centres, digital platforms and advertising, though the company would still legally be called Tata Motors Passenger Vehicles.

== Operations ==
Tata Motors Passenger Vehicles makes products in the compact, midsize car, and utility vehicle segments. The company's manufacturing plants in India are in Pune (Maharashtra) and Sanand (Gujarat). Tata's dealership, sales, service, and spare parts network comprise over 3,500 touchpoints. Tata Motors has more than 250 dealerships in more than 195 cities across 27 states and four Union Territories of India. It has the third-largest sales and service network after Maruti Suzuki and Hyundai.

Tata also has franchisee/joint venture assembly operations in Kenya, Bangladesh, Ukraine, Russia, and Senegal. Tata has dealerships in 26 countries across 4 continents. Tata is present in many countries, it has managed to create a large consumer base in the Indian subcontinent, namely India, Bangladesh, Bhutan, Sri Lanka and Nepal. Tata is also present in Italy, Spain, Poland, Romania, Turkey, Chile, South Africa, Oman, Kuwait, Qatar, Saudi Arabia, United Arab Emirates, Bahrain, Iraq, Syria and Australia.

=== Jaguar Land Rover ===
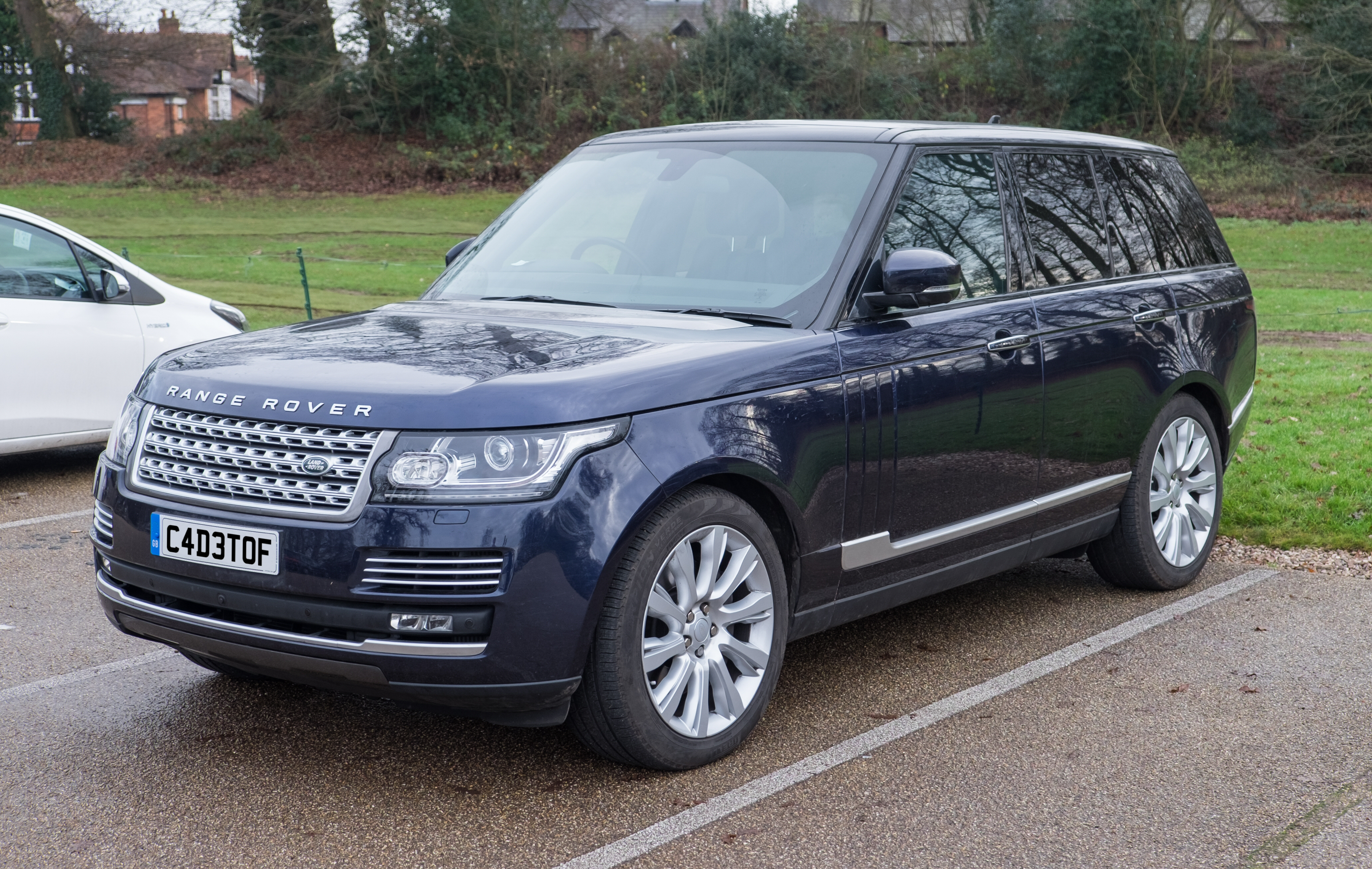
Range Rover (L405)

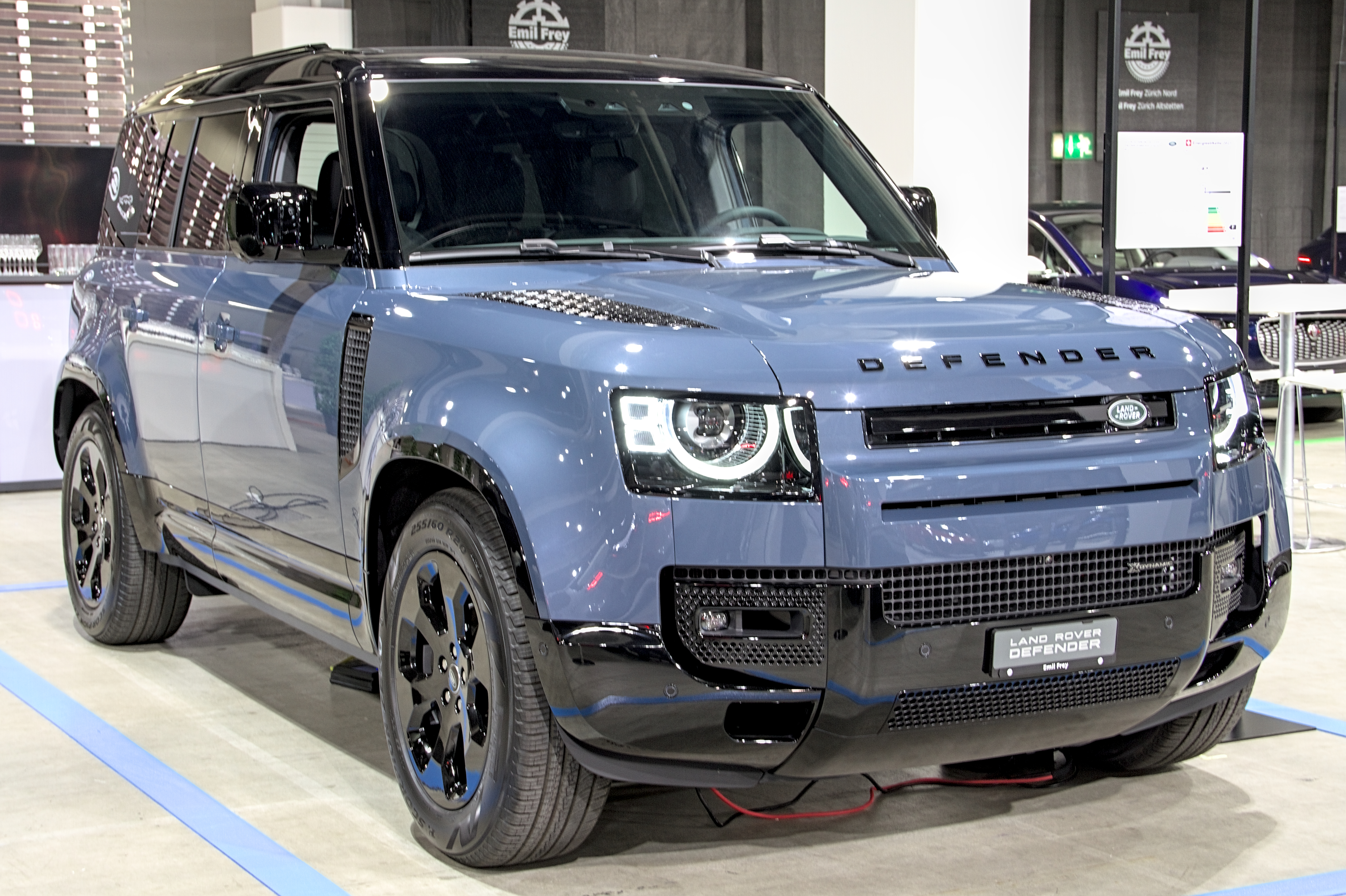
Land Rover Defender

Jaguar Land Rover (JLR) is a premium British automaker headquartered in Whitley, Coventry, United Kingdom, and has been a wholly owned subsidiary of Tata Motors since June 2008, when it acquired the two brands from the American Ford Motor Company. Its principal activity is the development, manufacture and sale of Jaguar luxury and sports cars and Land Rover premium four-wheel-drive vehicles.

JLR has two design centres and three assembly plants in the United Kingdom. Under Tata ownership, JLR has launched new vehicles including the Range Rover Evoque, Jaguar F-Type, the Jaguar XE, the Jaguar XJ (X351), the second-generation Range Rover Sport, and Jaguar XF, the fourth-generation Land Rover Discovery, Range Rover Velar and the Range Rover (L405).

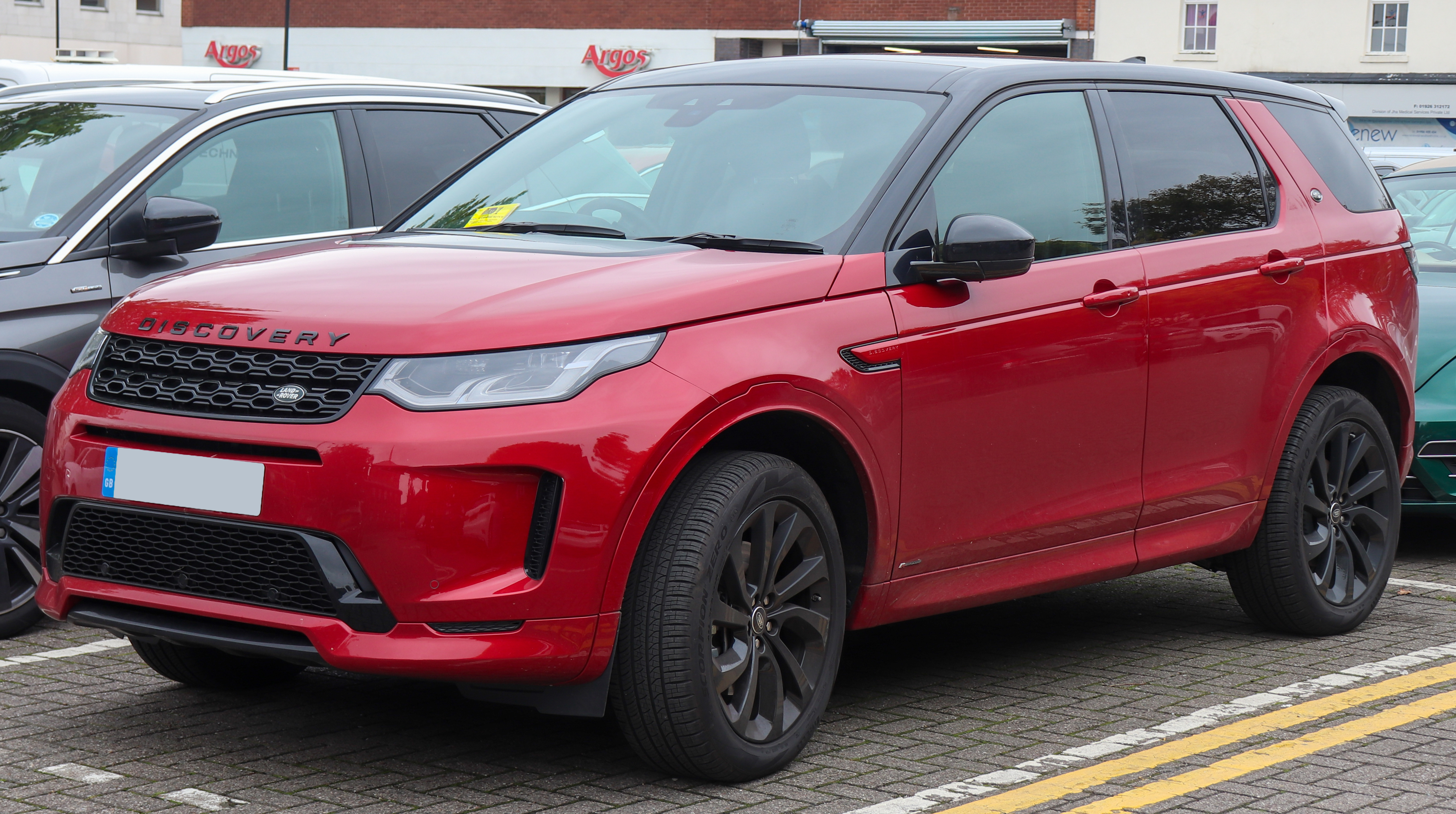
Land Rover Discovery Sport

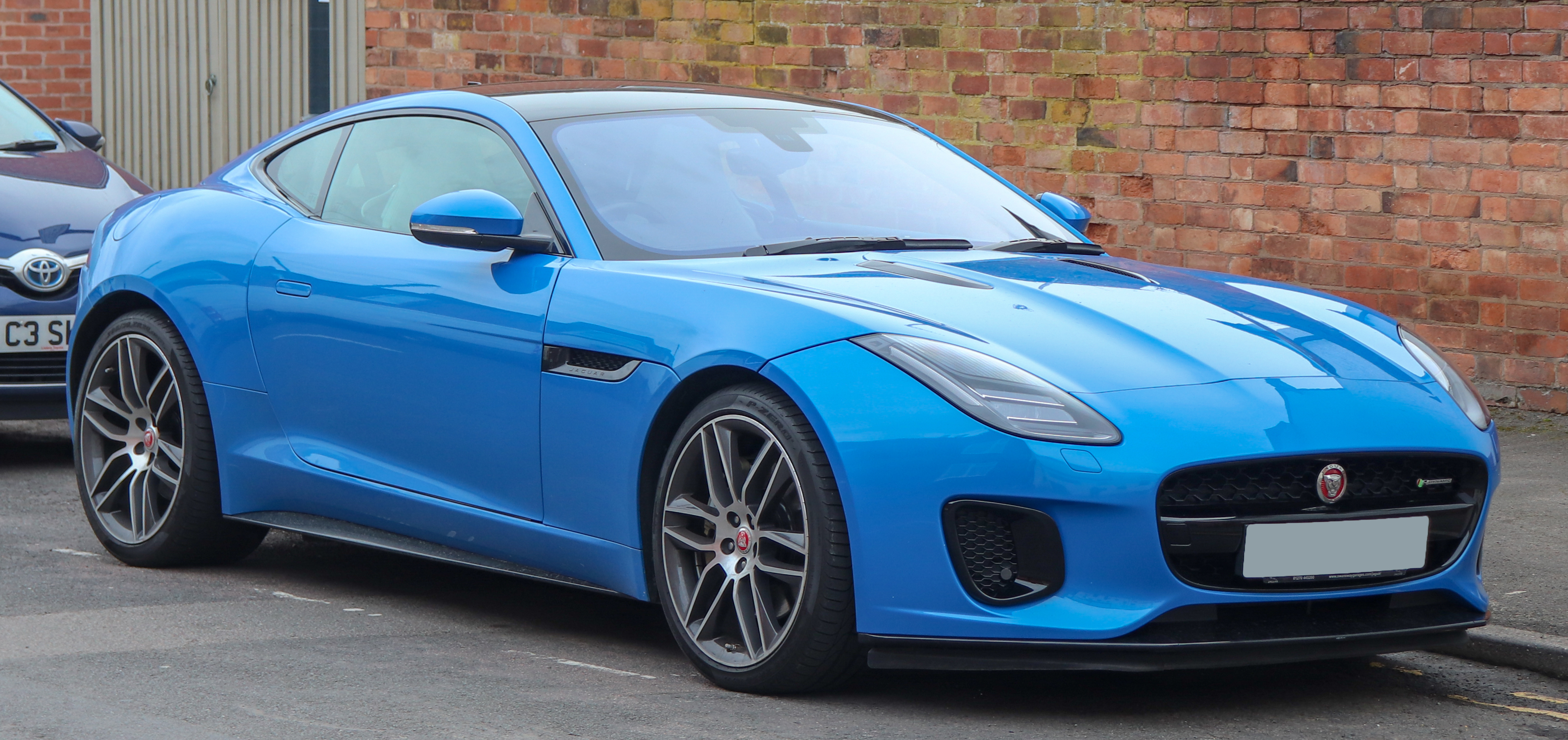
Jaguar F-Type

JD Power, of the US, rates Land Rover and Jaguar as the two worst brands for initial quality. The Jaguar F-Pace made Consumer Reports February 2019 list of the 10 Least Reliable Cars. The editors cited "electronics, drive system, power equipment, noises and leaks" as problematic aspects.

JLR was struggling by 2019 and Tata Motors wrote down its investment in JLR by $3.9 billion. Much of the financial problem was due to a 50% drop in sales in China during 2019, although the situation was improving. Still, Tata was open to considering a partnership with another company according to a statement in mid-October, as long as the partnership agreement would allow Tata to maintain control of the business. The company ruled out the possibility of a sale of JLR to another entity.

In July 2023, the Tata Group announced its plans to invest £4 billion to build an electric car battery factory in the UK, which will be one of the largest of its kind in Europe. The factory will be the first facility operated by the group's battery manufacturing subsidiary, Agratas, outside India. Located in Bridgwater, Somerset, the factory will supply future battery electric Jaguar and Land Rover models, with the potential to also supply other car manufacturers. Production at the new facility is due to start in 2026.

=== Electric vehicles ===
Tata Passenger Electric Mobility (TATA.ev) is a subsidiary which produces battery electric cars under the Tata.Cars brand.

Tata Motors unveiled electric versions of the Tata Indica passenger car powered by TM4 electric motors and inverters, and running on lithium batteries.

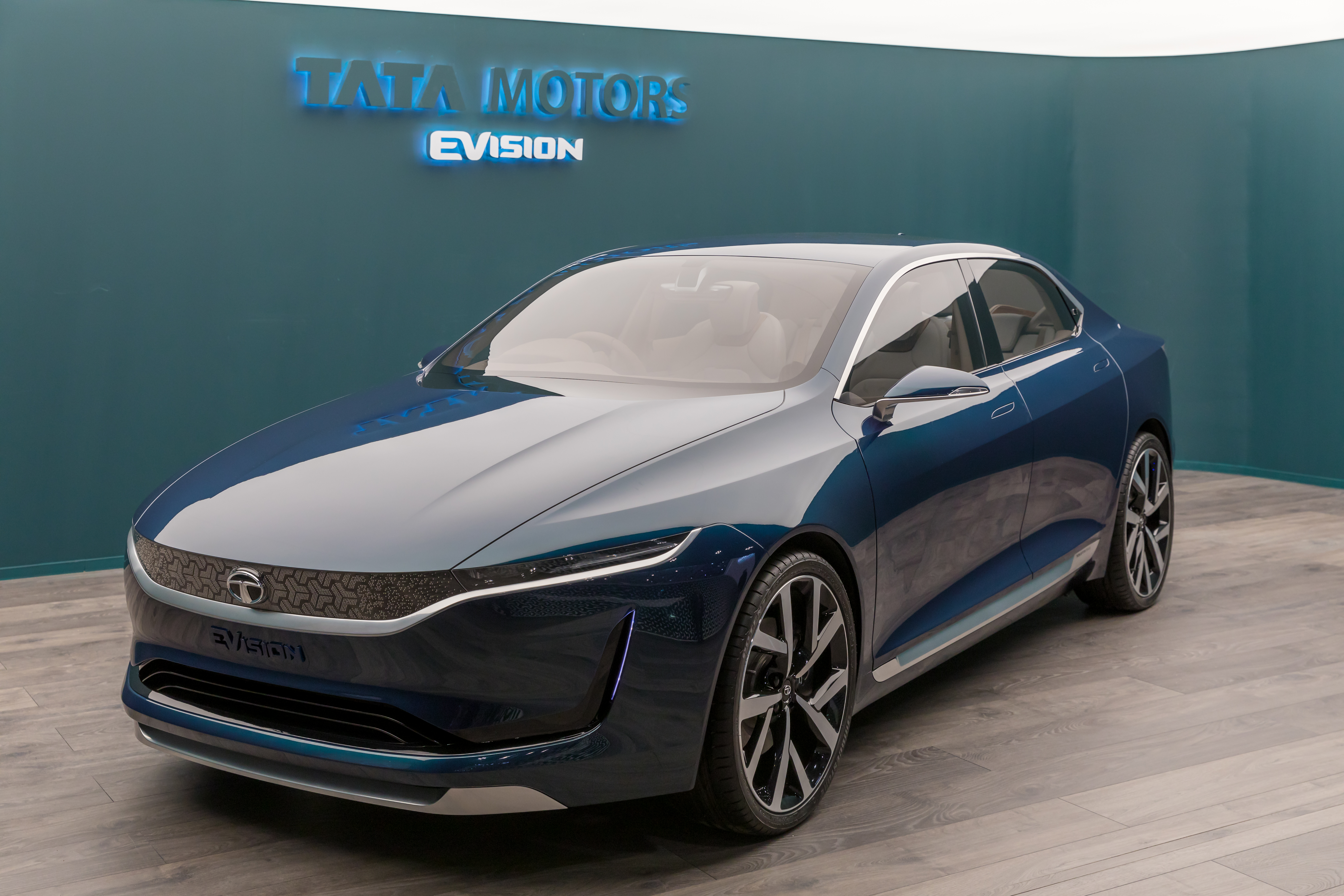
Tata EVision concept (2018)

In 2008 Tata Motors' UK subsidiary, Tata Motors European Technical Centre, bought a 50.3% holding in electric vehicle technology firm Miljøbil Grenland/Innovasjon of Norway for US$1.93 million, and planned to launch the electric Indica hatchback in Europe the following year.

In December 2019, Tata Motors unveiled the Nexon EV, an SUV with a 30.2 kWh lithium-ion battery and a consistent range of 312 km on a single charge. It is also equipped with fast charging technology, which can charge the vehicle from 0% - 80% in 60 minutes.

Tata announced the Avinya brand of premium electric vehicles in November 2023, to be launched in 2026 using JLR's Electrified Modular Architecture. After a delay to 2027, in June 2026, Tata agreed to license a platform developed by Chinese automaker Chery for the Freelander 8 produced by Chery JLR, to be used in the brand's vehicles; Tata will assemble vehicles in a Panapakkam facility from Chinese knock-down kits made by Chery.

=== Tata Technologies ===
Tata Technologies Limited (TTL) is a 43%-owned subsidiary of Tata Motors which provides design, engineering, and business process outsourcing services to the automotive industry. It is headquartered in Pune's Hinjawadi business district and also has operations in London, Detroit and Thailand. Its clients include Ford, General Motors, Honda, and Toyota.

The British engineering and design services company Incat International, which specialises in engineering and design services and product lifecycle management in the automotive, aerospace, and engineering sectors, is a wholly owned subsidiary of TTL. It was acquired by TTL in August 2005 for ₹4 billion.

In 2017, TAL, a subsidiary of Tata Motors, manufactured India's first industrial articulated robot for micro, small, and medium enterprises.

=== Stellantis partnership ===
Fiat India Automobiles is an India-based joint venture between Tata and Stellantis (formerly Fiat, then FCA) which produces Jeep and Tata branded passenger cars, as well as engines and transmissions. Tata Motors has gained access to Fiat's diesel engine and transmission technology through the joint venture.

The two companies formerly also had a distribution joint venture through which Fiat products were sold in India through joint Tata-Fiat dealerships. This distribution arrangement was ended in March 2013; Stellantis cars have since been distributed in India by Stellantis India, a wholly owned subsidiary of Stellantis.

=== Tata Motors Design Tech Centre ===
The Tata Motors Design Tech Centre, formerly known as the Tata Motors European Technical Centre, is an automotive design, engineering, and research company based at WMG, University of Warwick on the campus of the University of Warwick in England. It was established in 2005.

In September 2013, it was announced that a new National Automotive Innovation Campus would be built at WMG at Warwick's main campus at a cost of £100 million. The initiative will be a partnership between Tata Motors, the university, and Jaguar Land Rover, with £30 million in funding coming from Tata Motors.

== Leadership ==
=== Chairmen ===
- Ratan Tata (1991–2012 and 2016–2017)
- Cyrus Mistry (2012–2016)
- Natarajan Chandrasekaran (2017–present)

=== CEOs ===
- Carl-Peter Forster (2010–2011)
- Karl Slym (2012–2014)
- Cyrus Mistry (2015–2016)
- Guenter Butschek (2016–2021)
- Girish Wagh (2021–2025)
- Shailesh Chandra (2025–present)

== Products ==
=== Current models ===
==== ICE vehicles ====
Model	Calendar year introduced	Current model	Vehicle information
Model	Calendar year introduced	Introduction	Vehicle information
Hatchback
Tiago	2016	2026	City car (A-segment)
Altroz	2020	2025	Subcompact hatchback (B-segment)
Sedan
Aeris	2017 (As Tigor)	2026	Subcompact sedan (B-segment)
SUV/crossover
Punch	2021	2026	Crossover city car (A-segment)
Nexon	2017	2023	Subcompact crossover SUV (B-segment)
Curvv	2024	2024	Subcompact crossover coupe SUV (C-segment)
Sierra	1991	2025	Subcompact crossover SUV (C-segment)
Harrier	2019	2023	Compact crossover SUV with 5-seater (C-segment)
Safari	1998	2023	Mid-size crossover SUV with 7-seater (D-segment)

==== Electric vehicles ====
Model	Calendar year introduced	Current model	Vehicle information
Model	Calendar year introduced	Introduction	Vehicle information
Hatchback
Tiago.ev	2022	2026	City car (A-segment)
Sedan
Tigor.ev	2019	2021	Subcompact sedan (B-segment)
SUV/crossover
Punch.ev	2024	2026	Crossover city car (A-segment)
Nexon.ev	2020	2023	Subcompact crossover SUV (B-segment)
Curvv.ev	2024	2024	Subcompact crossover coupe SUV (C-segment)
Sierra.ev	2026	2026	Subcompact crossover SUV (C-segment)
Harrier.ev	2025	2025	Compact crossover SUV with 5-seater (C-segment)

=== Former models ===
Model	Released	Discontinued	Image
Telcoline	1988	2010	
Estate	1992	2000	
Sumo	1994	2019	
Indica	1998	2018	
Spacio	2000	2011	
Indigo	2002	2018	
Indigo Marina	2006	2009	
Xenon	2007	2018	
Sumo Grande	2008	2016	
Vista	2008	2016	
Nano	2008	2018	
Manza	2009	2016	
Venture	2010	2017	
Aria	2010	2017	
Zest	2014	2019	
Bolt	2014	2019	
Hexa	2017	2020	

=== Concept vehicles ===
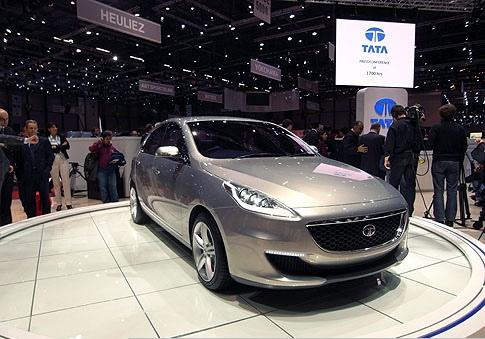
The Tata Pr1ma concept car

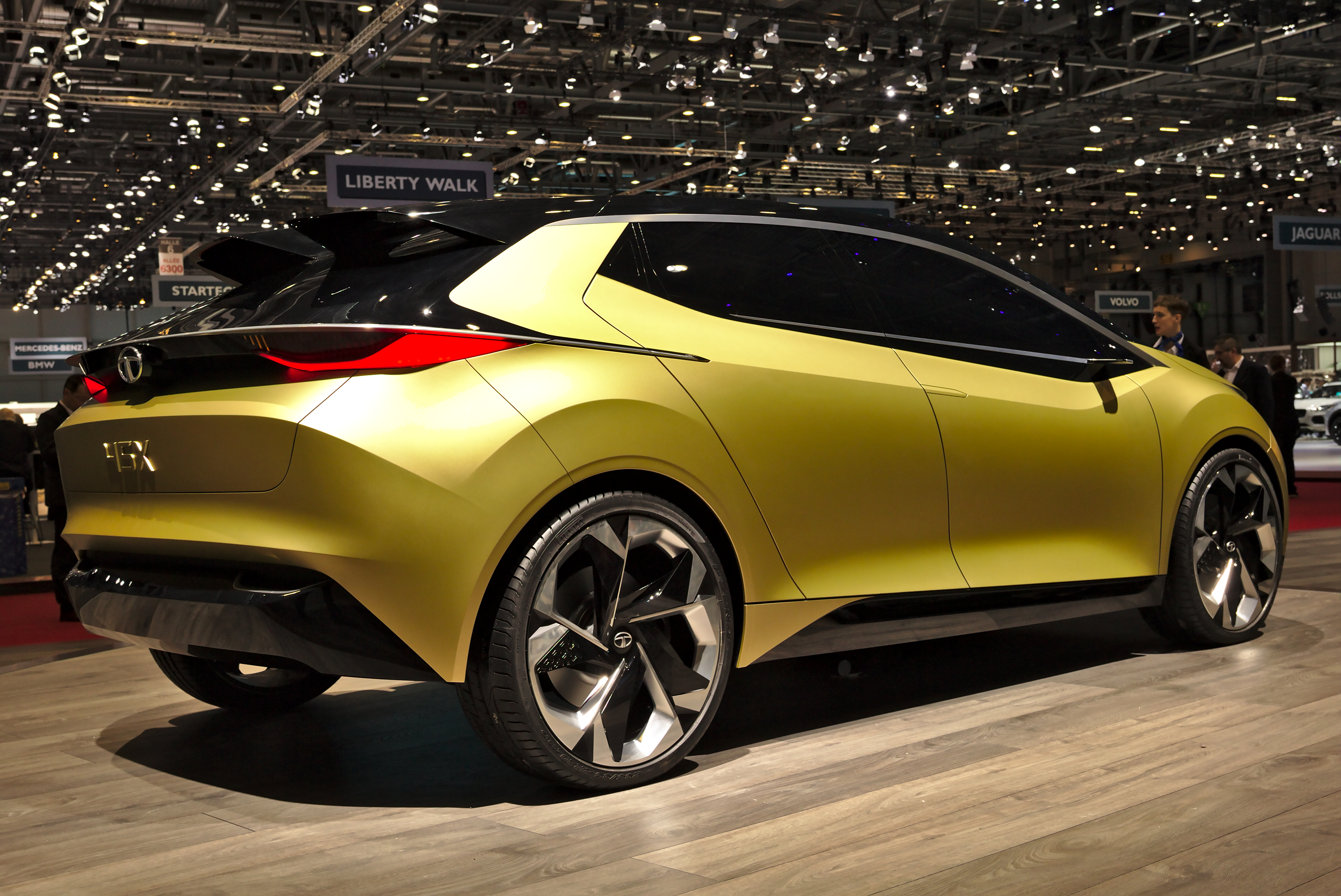
Tata 45X Concept at Geneva Motor show

- 2000 Aria Roadster
- 2001 Aria Coupe
- 2002 Tata Indica
- 2004 Tata Indigo Advent
- 2005 Tata Xover
- 2006 Tata Cliffrider
- 2007 Tata Elegante
- 2009 Tata Prima
- 2011 Tata Pixel
- 2012 Tata Megapixel
- 2014 Tata Nexon
- 2014 Tata Connectnext
- 2015 Tata Tamo Racemo
- 2018 Tata 45X Concept (Launched as Tata Altroz on 22 January 2020)
- 2018 Tata H5X Concept (Launched as Tata Harrier on 23 January 2019)
- 2019 Tata H7x (later known as Tata Gravitas and launched as Tata Safari on 15 Feb 2021)
- 2020 Tata HBX Concept (Launched as Tata Punch on 18 Oct 2021)
- 2020 Tata Altroz EV
- 2020 Tata Sierra EV (Expected to Launch in 2026)
- 2018 Tata E-Vision Electric
- 2022 Tata Curvv Electric
- 2022 Tata Avinya Electric (Expected to Launch In 2026-27)
- 2023 Tata Sierra.ev
- 2023 Tata Harrier.ev

== See also ==
- Tata Revotron engine
