= Vision E =

Vision E or Vision-E may refer to:

- Roewe Vision-E, a 2017 Chinese compact electric SUV concept
- Škoda Vision E, a 2017 Czech compact electric SUV concept
- Mercedes-Benz V-ision e, a 2015 German electric minivan concept based on the Mercedes-Benz V-Class

== See also ==
- Tata EVision, a 2018 Indian compact sedan concept
- Vision Eternel, a Canadian-American ambient rock band
- Vision Express, a British eyewear company
