= Tata Tiago EV =

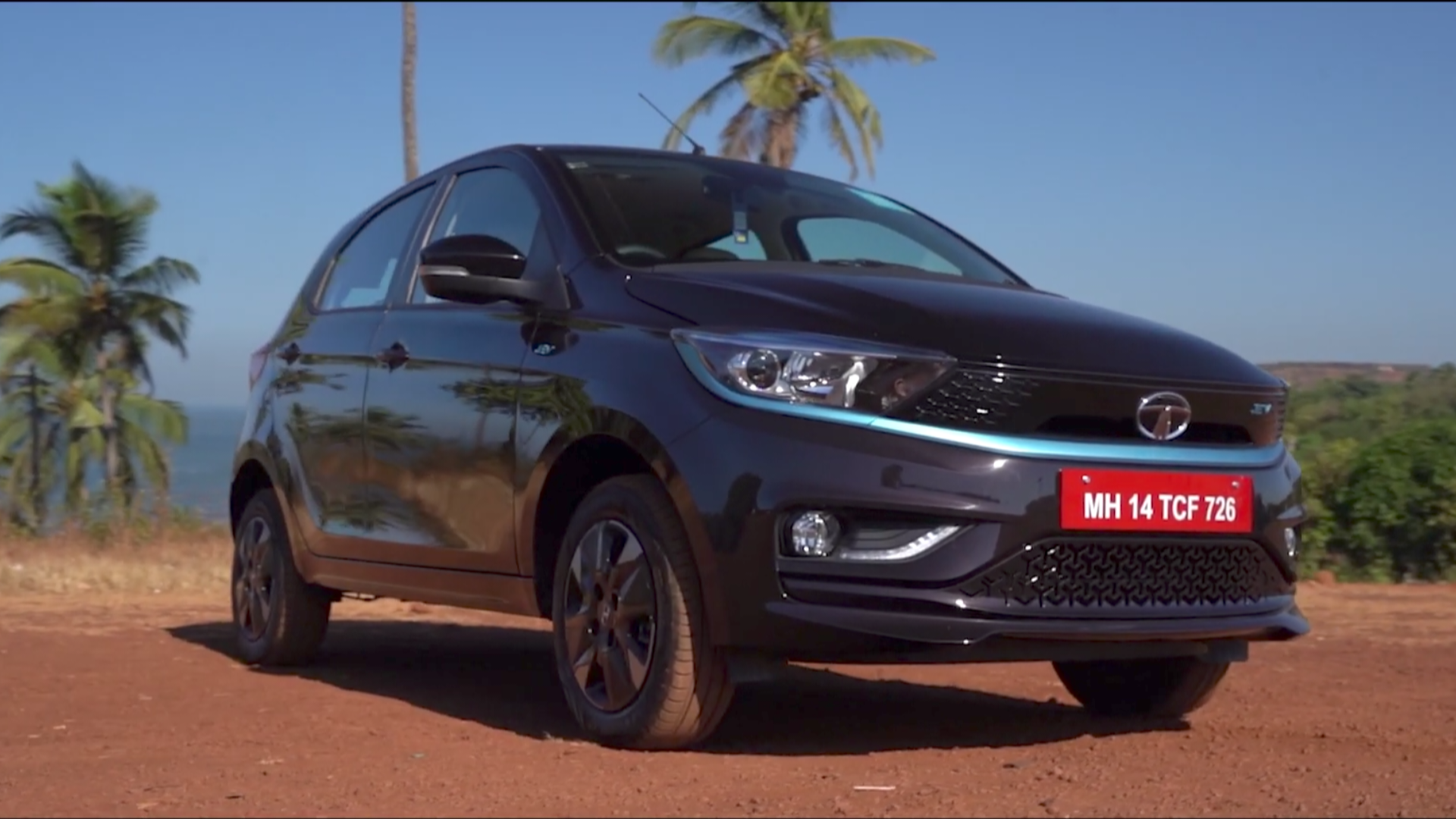
- 2022 Tata Tiago EV IB XZ+ Tech LR (pre-facelift)

Overview
- Manufacturer: Tata Motors
- Production: 2022–present
- Assembly: Sanand, India

Body and chassis
- Class: City car (A-segment)
- Body style: 5-door hatchback
- Layout: Front-motor, front-wheel drive layout
- Platform: Tata X0
- Related: Tata Tiago

Powertrain
- Electric motor: Permanent magnet synchronous motor
- Transmission: 1-speed automatic
- Battery: 19.2 kWh / 24 kWh Li-ion
- Electric range: 250–315 km (MIDC)
- Plug-in charging: 3.3 kW, 7.2 kW AC / 25 kW DC fast charging

Dimensions
- Wheelbase: 2400 mm
- Length: 3769 mm
- Width: 1677 mm
- Height: 1536 mm
- Curb weight: 1235–1255 kg (approx)

The Tata Tiago EV is an electric vehicle produced by Tata Motors. Launched in September 2022, it is positioned as an entry-level electric hatchback in the Indian market. Based on the Tata Tiago, the electric version incorporates an electric powertrain along with modifications suited for EV usage.

== Overview ==
The Tiago EV retains the overall body design of its internal combustion engine counterpart but features EV-specific updates. These include a closed grille, aerodynamic alloy wheels, EV badging, and updated LED lighting elements in the 2025 facelift.

=== Powertrain and battery ===
The Tiago EV is offered with two battery options:

- A 19.2 kWh battery producing 60.34 bhp and 110 Nm of torque, with a claimed MIDC range of 250 km.
- A 24 kWh battery producing 73.75 bhp and 114 Nm of torque, with a claimed MIDC range of 315 km.

It uses a permanent magnet synchronous motor and is equipped with a single-speed automatic transmission.

Charging options include:

- 3.3 kW AC home charger: ~8.7 hours (10–100%)
- 7.2 kW AC charger: ~6.9 hours (10–100%)
- 25 kW DC fast charging: ~58 minutes (10–80%)

==== Variants ====
Variant	Battery Capacity	Claimed Range (MIDC)	Drive Type
XE (MR)	19.2 kWh	250 km	FWD
XT (MR)	19.2 kWh	250 km	FWD
XT (LR)	24 kWh	315 km	FWD
XZ+ Tech Lux (LR)	24 kWh	315 km	FWD

=== Features ===
The 2025 update of the Tiago EV includes support for Android Auto and Apple CarPlay, a semi-digital instrument cluster, regenerative braking, and also offers features such as automatic climate control, hill-hold assist, and a tyre pressure monitoring system (TPMS).

== International availability ==
The Tata Tiago EV has also been launched in international markets.

=== Sri Lanka ===
In March 2025, Tata Motors, in partnership with local distributor DIMO, introduced the Tiago EV in Sri Lanka alongside both electric and internal combustion engine models, including Punch, Nexon, and Curvv.

=== Mauritius ===
In March 2025, Tata EV (formerly Tata Passenger Electric Mobility) announced the availability of the Tiago EV, along with Punch EV and Nexon EV, in Mauritius through its new partnership with distributor Allied Motors. This was the car's first sale outside the South Asian region.

== See also ==
- Tata Motors
- Tata Nexon EV
- Plug-in electric vehicles in India
