= Tata Harrier EV =

Battery-electric compact crossover SUV

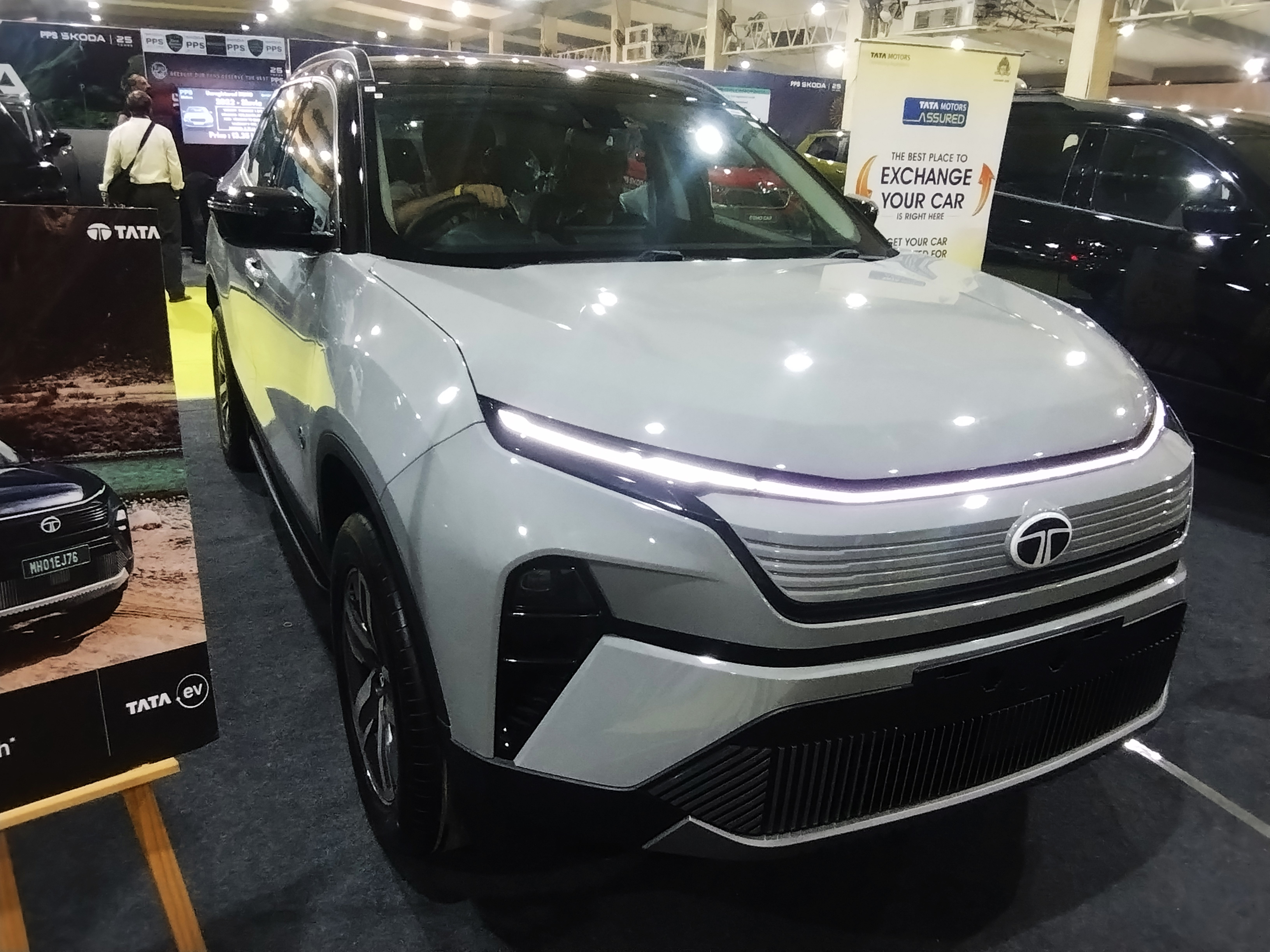

Overview
- Manufacturer: Tata Motors
- Production: 2025–present
- Assembly: India: Pune

Body and chassis
- Class: Compact crossover SUV
- Body style: 5-door SUV
- Layout: Rear-motor, rear-wheel drive; Dual-motor, four-wheel-drive layout
- Platform: acti.ev Plus
- Related: Tata Harrier

Powertrain
- Electric motor: Permanent magnet synchronous motor
- Transmission: Single-speed
- Battery: 65 kWh or 75 kWh LFP
- Range: Up to 627 km (390 mi) (MIDC)
- Plug-in charging: 120 kW DC

Dimensions
- Wheelbase: 2,741 mm (107.9 in)
- Length: 4,607 mm (181.4 in)
- Width: 1,922 mm (75.7 in)
- Height: 1,740 mm (68.5 in)
- Curb weight: 2,235–2,336 kg (4,927–5,150 lb)

The Tata Harrier EV (alternatively spelled Harrier.ev) is a battery electric compact crossover SUV manufactured by Tata Motors launched in India on 3 June 2025. It is built on Tata's acti.ev Plus platform and incorporates features such as all-wheel drive and advanced driver assistance systems (ADAS).

== Overview ==
The Harrier EV was first unveiled as a concept at the Auto Expo 2023 and later introduced in production form in 2025. While it shares some design elements with the Tata Harrier, the EV variant includes platform modifications to accommodate electrification. The vehicle is available in three standard variants—Adventure, Fearless, Empowered—and a special Stealth Edition with matte black styling.

Bookings began in July 2025. It competes in the Indian EV market with other mid-size electric SUVs, including the Mahindra XEV 9e and BYD Atto 3.

== Design ==
=== Exterior ===
The exterior includes a closed-off front grille, full-width LED daytime running lights, 19-inch alloy wheels, and connected LED tail lamps. The Stealth Edition features a matte black finish.

=== Interior ===
The Harrier EV's interior includes a dual-tone grey and white color scheme, leatherette seats, and a panoramic sunroof. It is equipped with a 14.5-inch infotainment screen, a 12.25-inch instrument cluster, and a 10.25-inch digital driver display. Additional features include a 540° camera system, summon mode, OTA updates, and connected car services via Tata's iRA platform.

== Powertrain and performance ==
The Harrier EV offers two LFP battery packs: 65 kWh and 75 kWh. Tata claims a range of up to 627 km (390 mi) on India's MIDC test cycle and 0–100 km/h acceleration in 6.3 seconds using Boost Mode. The AWD variant includes dual electric motors delivering up to 390 bhp (291 kW; 395 PS) and 504 N⋅m (372 lb⋅ft) of torque.

Charging options include 120 kW DC fast charging (20–80% in 25 minutes) and AC home charging at 3.3 kW or 7.2 kW. It also supports Vehicle-to-Load (V2L) and Vehicle-to-Vehicle (V2V) power transfer.

== Safety and ADAS ==
Safety features include 6 or 7 airbags (it depends on the variant), ABS with EBD, ESP, electronic parking brake with auto-hold, and Level 2 ADAS including adaptive cruise control and lane-keeping assist.

The Harrier.ev for India was rated 5 Star in Bharat NCAP (based on Latin NCAP 2016) in 2025.

Bharat NCAP test results Tata Harrier.ev (2025, based on Latin NCAP 2016)
Test	Score	Stars
Adult occupant protection	32.00/32.00	5 /5 stars
Child occupant protection	45.00/49.00	5 /5 stars

== Variants ==
- Adventure
- Fearless
- Empowered
- Stealth Edition

== See also ==
- Plug-in electric vehicles in India
