= Fiat India Automobiles =

Indian automotive joint venture plant

Fiat India Automobiles Private Ltd
- Type: Joint venture
- Industry: Automotive
- Founded: February 2006; 20 years ago
- Headquarters: Ranjangaon, Maharastra, India
- Products: Automobiles; engines; transmissions
- Revenue: ▲₹21,592 crore (US$2.2 billion) (2023)
- Parent: Stellantis (50%); Tata Motors Passenger Vehicles (50%)

Fiat India Automobiles Private Ltd (FIAPL) is an Indian automobile manufacturing company located in Ranjangaon near Pune, Maharastra, jointly owned by Stellantis and Tata Motors.

== History ==
Fiat and Tata first formed the partnership in February 2006. The agreement was meant to give Tata access to Fiat's multi-jet diesel engines. Fiat already had its Indian operations located at the Ranjangaon plant. The plant was expected to produce passenger cars, engines and transmissions for both Indian market and export. Tata said US$650 million would be invested into the plant. In October 2007, production was reported to exceed 100,000 cars and 200,000 engines and transmissions, and provide direct and indirect employment to over 4,000 people. That month, Fiat Palio production commenced.

The joint venture has produced 1.3 Multijet engine and corresponding powertrains common to a number for supply to the Fiat Palio, Fiat Grande Punto, Fiat Linea, Fiat Avventura, Fiat Urban Cross, Tata Vista Tata Manza, as well as Premier's Rio and Maruti Suzuki's S-Cross.

Fiat merged with American automaker Chrysler on 12 October 2014, with the resulting entity named Fiat Chrysler Automobiles (FCA). In February 2016, FCA announced it would launch the Jeep brand, inherited from Chrysler, in India, with a new model to begin production at the Ranjangaon plant in 2017; it had previously announced plans to invest US$280 million into the plant to support production of a Jeep model in July 2015. On 1 June 2017, the first locally produced Jeep Compass rolled off the assembly line. Exports to other right-hand drive markets commenced in October.

In May 2017, FCA signed a contract for the production and supply of the 2.0 liter Multijet II turbo diesel engines to Tata. The 2.0-liter Multijet II engine in the same year went into production at the Indian Ranjangaon plant to be adopted by the Jeep Compass also produced locally. The supply to Tata Motors concerns about 70,000 per year to be fitted to the Tata Harrier SUV that went into production at the end of 2018. It has also been used by MG in the Hector since 2019, and in the Tata Safari since 2021.

In November 2018, FCA discontinued the Fiat brand in India due to low sales, with production of the Fiat Punto models (including the Abarth version), Avventura and Linea ending.

In September 2023, the plant's paint shop briefly caught fire. A Tata Motors spokesperson said the incident was brought under control "very quickly" and that it would not impact supply.

== Production ==
=== Current models ===
- Jeep Compass (2017–present)
- Tata Nexon (2017–present)
- Tata Altroz (2020–present)
- Jeep Wrangler (2021–present, CKD assembly)
- Jeep Meridian/Commander (2022–present)
- Jeep Grand Cherokee (2022–present, CKD assembly)
- Tata Curvv (2024–present)

=== Former models ===
- Fiat Palio (2007–2010)
- Fiat Grande Punto (2008–2014)
- Fiat Linea (2008–2018)
- Tata Zest (2014–2019)
- Fiat Punto Evo (2014–2018)
- Fiat Avventura (2014–2018)
