= Dimos =

Dimos (Greek: Δήμος) may refer to the following people:

== Given name or nickname ==
- Dimosthenis Dimos Baxevanidis (born 1988), Greek footballer
- Dimosthenis Chantzaras (born 1997), Greek footballer
- Dimosthenis Dimos Dikoudis (born 1977), Greek basketball player
- Dimosthenis Kavouras (born 1962), Greek former football player and manager
- Dimos Kokas (born 1997), Greek footballer
- Dimosthenis Dimos Manglaras (born 1940), Greek long jumper
- Dimosthenis Manousakis (born 1981), Greek former footballer
- Dimitrios Dimos Moutsis (1938–2024), Greek singer-songwriter and composer

== Surname ==
- Jimmy Dimos (born 1938), American judge
- Markos Dimos (born 1972), Greek former footballer
- Anastasios Tasos Dimos (born 1960), Greek painter and sculptor
- Christopher Dimos (born 1981), American Entrepreneur

== See also ==
- Dimo (name)
