= Guenter Butschek =

German businessman

Guenter Karl Butschek (born 21 October 1960) is a German businessman and is the CEO of the German startup Cubonic.

== Career ==
He was the CEO and managing director of Indian automotive company Tata Motors from 2016 to 2021. Apart from managing Tata Motors' India business, Butschek was also responsible for all other domestic and overseas subsidiaries, joint ventures and associates of Tata Motors. He was the highest paid CEO among Indian auto companies.

Before his time at Tata Motors, Butschek was the COO of Airbus for four years, and he worked at Daimler AG for 25 years prior to Airbus.

In May 2025, Tata Motors appointed Butschek to a five-year term as an independent director for the company.
