= Dimu, Syria =

Dimu ديمو Daymu, Dimo
- Village
- Location in Syria
- Coordinates: 35°12′9″N 36°26′52″E
- Country: Syria
- Governorate: Hama
- District: Masyaf
- Subdistrict: Jubb Ramlah

Population (2004)
  - Total: 1,102
- Time zone: UTC+3 (AST)
- City Qrya Pcode: C3375

Dimu (Arabic: ديمو, also spelled Demo) is a Syrian village located in the Jubb Ramlah Subdistrict of the Masyaf District in Hama Governorate, 43 kilometers west of Hama. According to the Syria Central Bureau of Statistics (CBS), Dimu had a population of 1,102 in the 2004 census. Its inhabitants are predominantly Sunni Muslims.

A municipal council was established to administer Dimu in 1995. Most of Dimu's working population is employed in agriculture, with the principal crops being potatoes, wheat, cotton, and summer vegetables. There is a primary school in the village.

== Bibliography ==
- Robinson, E.; Smith, E. (1841). Biblical Researches in Palestine, Mount Sinai and Arabia Petraea: A Journal of Travels in the year 1838. Vol. 3. Boston: Crocker & Brewster.
