= Tata EVision =

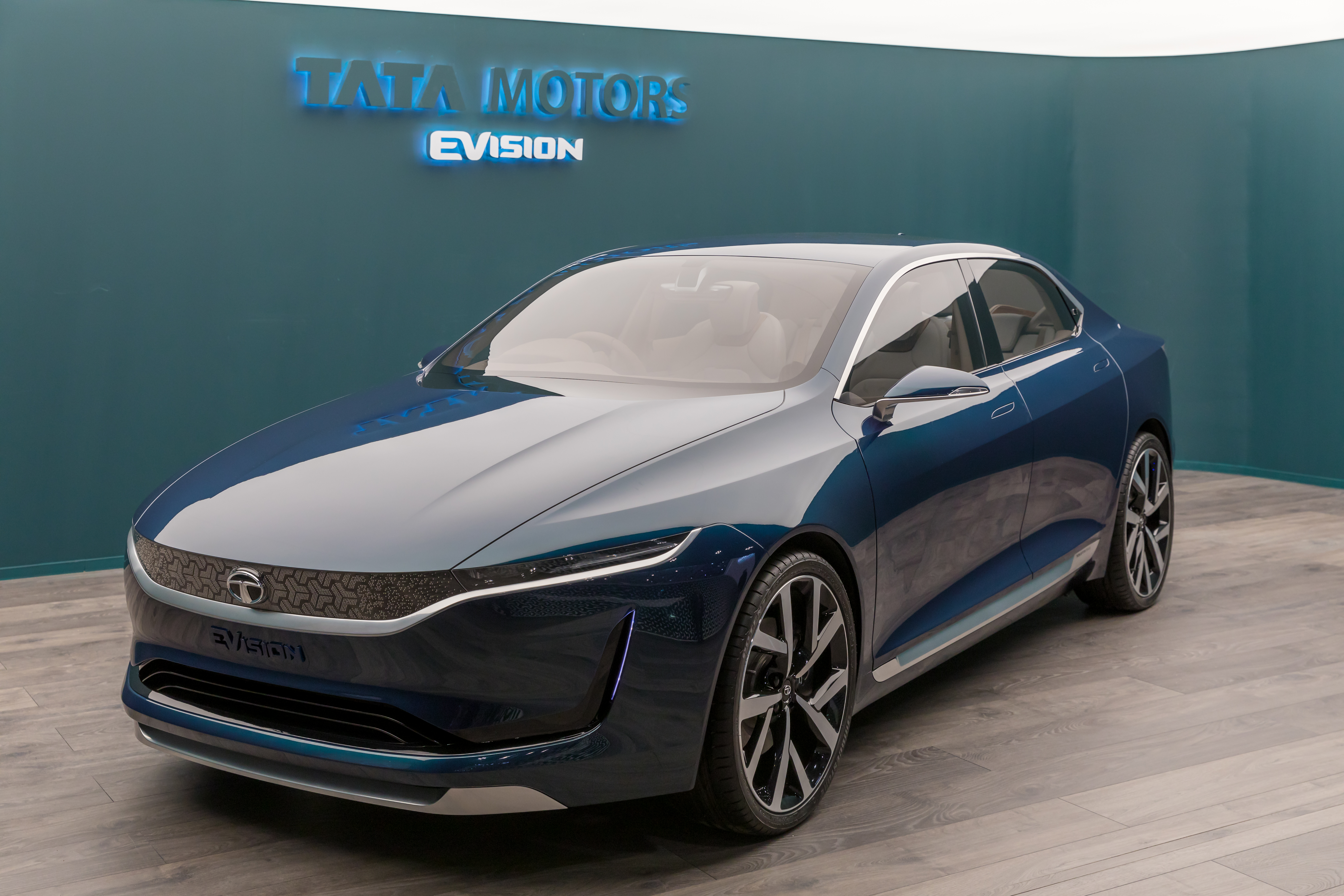

Overview
- Manufacturer: Tata Motors
- Production: Concept only
- Assembly: India: Pune

Body and chassis
- Class: Compact car (C)
- Body style: 4-door sedan
- Layout: front-engine, front-wheel-drive
- Platform: ALFA AMP platform

Powertrain
- Engine: 1.2 L Revotron I3 (petrol)
- Transmission: 6-speed manual 6-speed automatic

Dimensions
- Wheelbase: 2,501 mm (98.5 in)
- Length: 3,990 mm (157.1 in)
- Width: 1,833 mm (72.2 in)
- Height: 1,499 mm (59.0 in)
- Curb weight: 1,377 kg (3,036 lb)

The Tata EVision is a concept compact sedan by the Indian automobile manufacturer Tata Motors.

The EVision was unveiled at the 88th Geneva Motor Show in 2018.
