= Tata Curvv =

Compact crossover SUV

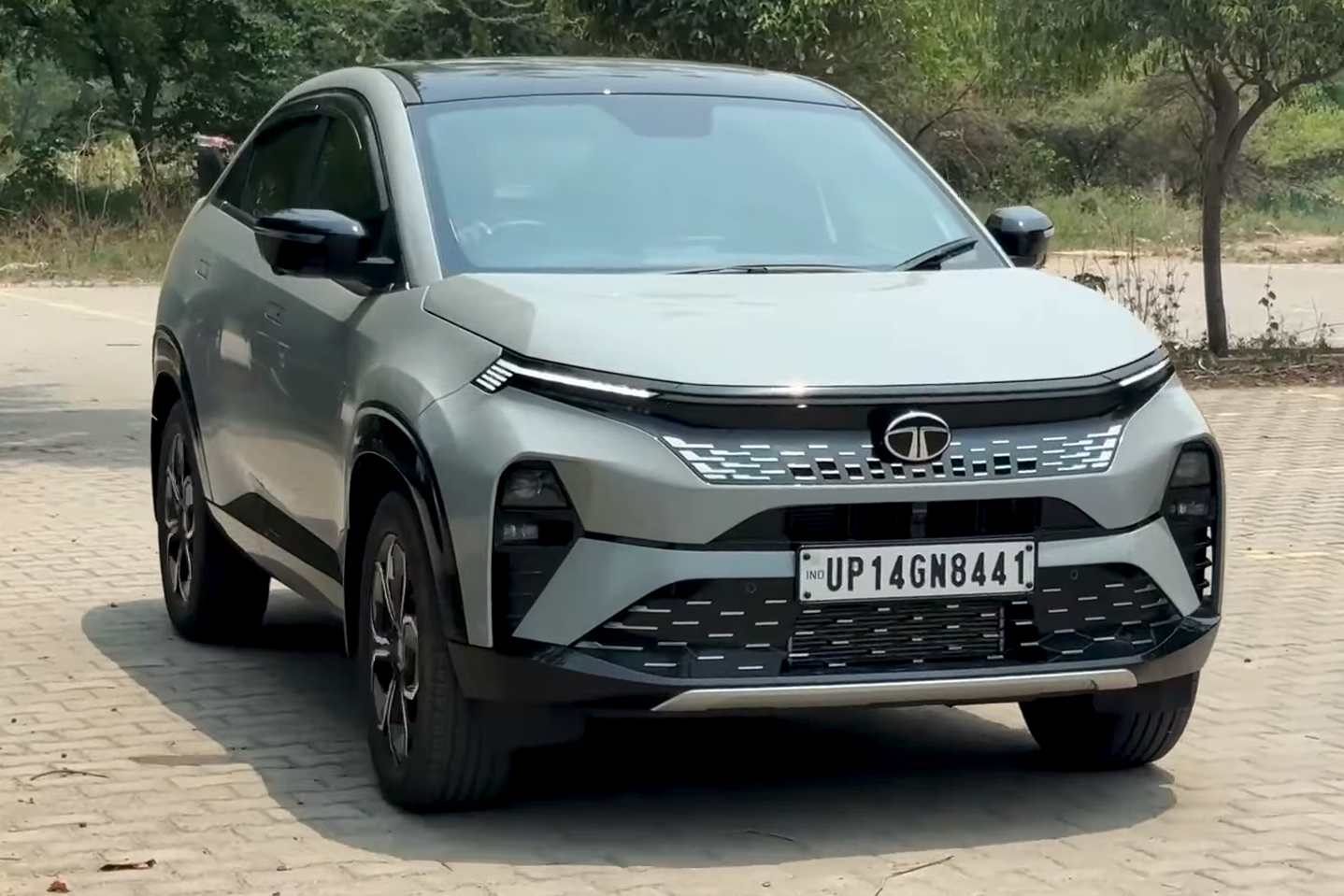
- Tata Curvv

Overview
- Manufacturer: Tata Motors
- Production: 2024–present
- Assembly: India: Ranjangaon, Pune (FIAPL); Sanand, Gujarat (TPEM)

Body and chassis
- Class: Subcompact SUV
- Body style: 5-door coupe SUV
- Layout: Front-engine, front-wheel-drive; Front-motor, front-wheel-drive (EV)
- Platform: Adaptive Tech Forward Lifestyle Architecture (ATLAS); Advanced Connected Tech-Intelligent Electric Vehicle (acti.ev)
- Related: Tata Nexon

Powertrain
- Engine: Petrol: 1.2 L Hyperion I3 turbo; Diesel: 1.5 L Revotorq I4 turbo
- Electric motor: Permanent magnet synchronous (EV)
- Power output: 120–125 PS (118–123 hp; 88–92 kW) (1.2 L petrol); 118 PS (116 hp; 87 kW) (1.5 L diesel); 110–123 kW (148–165 hp; 150–167 PS) (Curvv EV)
- Transmission: 6-speed manual; 7-speed DCT

Dimensions
- Wheelbase: 2,560 mm (100.8 in)
- Length: 4,308 mm (169.6 in)
- Width: 1,810 mm (71.3 in)
- Height: 1,640 mm (64.6 in)
- Curb weight: 1,225–1,346 kg (2,701–2,967 lb) 1,437–1,531 kg (3,168–3,375 lb) (Curvv EV)

The Tata Curvv is a compact SUV produced by Tata Motors. It launched in India in August 2024 with petrol, diesel, and battery electric variants. The Curvv is based on the smaller Nexon, with a lengthened rear section and reworked body panels while newer engine options and additional technology such as level 2 ADAS are reserved for top trims.

== History ==
The Curvv was first previewed as a concept model in April 2022. In February 2024, Tata introduced another near-production concept model of the Curvv at the 2024 Auto Expo.

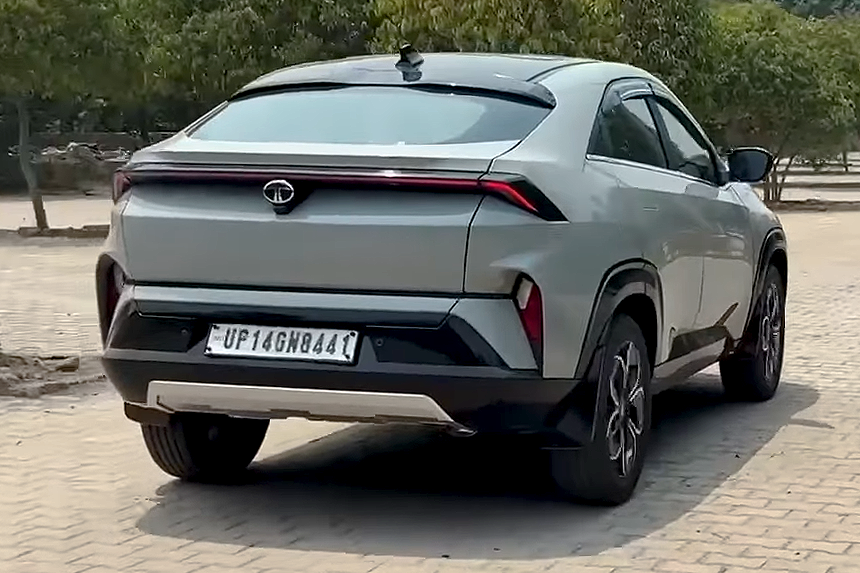
Rear view

== Specifications ==
The Curvv is based on the smaller Nexon, with much of the front section and the interior design are carried over from the smaller car. It is intended to occupy a higher segment, with a length of 4.3-metre. It is 313 mm (12.3 in) longer than the Nexon and has a 62 mm (2.4 in) longer wheelbase.

The ICE-powered Curvv is available with three engine options: a 120 PS (118 hp; 88 kW) 1.2-litre turbocharged petrol engine, a new 125 PS (123 hp; 92 kW), 1.2-litre direct injection turbocharged petrol option, and a 118 PS (116 hp; 87 kW), 1.5-litre turbo-diesel unit. All three engine options are available with a 6-speed manual transmission, along with an optional 7-speed dual-clutch automatic.

The Curvv EV is available with two battery pack options: 45 kWh with a 110 kW (148 hp; 150 PS) motor, and 55 kWh with a 123 kW (165 hp; 167 PS) motor. The 45 kWh pack provides a Modified Indian Drive Cycle (MIDC) range of 502 km (312 mi), while the 55 kWh pack offers 585 km (364 mi). Tata also claims a 50:50 front to rear weight distribution, a 208 mm (8.2 in) ground clearance and 450 mm (17.7 in) water wading depth for the Curvv EV.

== Safety ==
In 2024, the Curvv and Curvv.ev in their most basic specifications for India received 5 stars for adult occupants and 5 stars for toddlers from Bharat NCAP (based on Latin NCAP 2016).

Bharat NCAP test results Tata Curvv (2024, based on Latin NCAP 2016)
Test	Score	Stars
Adult occupant protection	29.50/32.00	5 /5 stars
Child occupant protection	43.66/49.00	5 /5 stars
