= Dimo (name) =

Dimo (Bulgarian or Macedonian: Димо) may refer to the following people:

Given name

- Dimo Angelov Tonchev (born 1952), Bulgarian cyclist
- Dimo Atanasov (born 1985), Bulgarian football player
- Dimo Bakalov (born 1988), Bulgarian football player
- Dimo Hadzhidimov (1875–1924), Bulgarian revolutionary
- Dimo Hamaambo (1932–2002), Namibian military commander
- Dimo Hyun Jun Kim (born 1991), South Korean theatre director
- Dimo Kostov (born 1947), Bulgarian wrestler
- Dimo Krastinov (born 1946), Bulgarian ice hockey player
- Dimo Todorovski (1910–1983), Macedonian artist
- Dimo Tonev (born 1964), Bulgarian volleyball player
- Dimo Wache (born 1973), German football player

Surname

- Amarildo Dimo (born 1982), Albanian football defender
- Paul Dimo (1905–1990), Romanian electrical engineer

== See also ==
- Dimos
- Dima
