= Diesel & Motor Engineering =

Sri Lankan conglomerate company

Diesel & Motor Engineering PLC
- The logo of Diesel & Motor Engineering
- Company type: Public
- Traded as: CSE: DIMO.N0000
- ISIN: LK0056N00008
- Industry: Retailing
- Founded: 1939; 87 years ago
- Headquarters: Colombo, Sri Lanka
- Key people: Ranjith Pandithage (Chairman/Managing Director); Gahanath Pandithage (Director/Group Chief Executive Officer)
- Revenue: ▼LKR35,299 million (2023)
- Operating income: ▲LKR5,299 million (2023)
- Net income: ▼LKR698 million (2023)
- Total assets: ▼LKR39,562 million (2023)
- Total equity: ▼LKR15,353 million (2023)
- Owner: Employees' Provident Fund (19.89%); A. R. Pandithage (11.17%); J. C. Pandithage (10.57%)
- Number of employees: 1,875 (2023)
- Subsidiaries: Tropical Health Food (Pvt) Ltd
- Website: www.dimolanka.com

Diesel & Motor Engineering PLC, commonly abbreviated as DIMO, is a Sri Lankan conglomerate company. The company engaged in vehicle sales, after-sales services, retail, construction and logistics solutions and agriculture sectors. The company was founded in 1939 and was listed on the Colombo Stock Exchange in 1964. DIMO is one of the LMD 100 companies, a list of quoted companies in Sri Lanka by revenue and ranked 39th in the 2020/21 edition.

== History ==
The company was founded in 1939 by Stephen Peries, Pandithage Don Alexander, Cyril Algama and Harold Algama. In 1945, the company was incorporated as a limited liability company. In 1961, DIMO started its partnership with Tata Motors. The company was listed on the Colombo Stock Exchange in 1964. DIMO expanded its business to Myanmar by establishing DIMO Lanka Company Limited in 2017. In 2018 the company ventured into the agricultural sector with the acquisitions of PlantChem (Pvt) Ltd and Plant Seed (Pvt) Ltd. These companies were DIMO's first acquisitions in its history.

== Operations ==
The company celebrated its 50-year partnership with Tata Motors in 2011. DIMO launched DIMO 800, an after-sales centre for Mercedes-Benz in 2014. Mercedes-Benz Fashion Week was hosted at DIMO 800 by DIMO in 2017. It is the largest after-sales centre in Asia with an area of 15,800 square feet (1,470 m^{2}). DIMO had to reduce margins to absorb the sharp depreciation of the Sri Lankan Rupee in 2018. In 2019, the company's conglomerate brand value was LKR7,730 million and ranked 15th amongst conglomerates in Sri Lanka. DIMO was adjudged as the overall winner in the sixth Excellence in Integrated Reporting Awards in 2020 organized by the CMA Sri Lanka.

=== Sri Lankan economic crisis ===
Due to the Sri Lankan economic crisis, the company was unable to import vehicle kits from India. Since the ban on vehicle import, the company started assembling Tata Ace. DIMO acquired Tropical Health Food Ltd., a fruit and vegetable exporting firm for LKR450 million. DIMO is shifting its focus on the agriculture sector due to the poor prospects in its core business area vehicle sales caused by the import ban on vehicles. The diversification into the agricultural sector paid off with the company's agricultural sector results rose by 384 per cent to LKR600 million in 2021. However, the company raised concerns over the government's policy of banning inorganic and chemical fertilizers. The company appointed Dilrukshi Kurukulasuriya and Rajeev Pandithage to the board of directors in June 2022. Before her appointment, Kurukulasuriya served as the chief human resources officer of the company. Pandithage joined the company as a management trainee and advanced through the corporate ranks. DIMO was recognized as a great place to work for the ninth consecutive year at the Great Place to Work Awards in 2021.

== See also ==
- List of companies listed on the Colombo Stock Exchange
