= Common rail =

Engine fuel delivery method

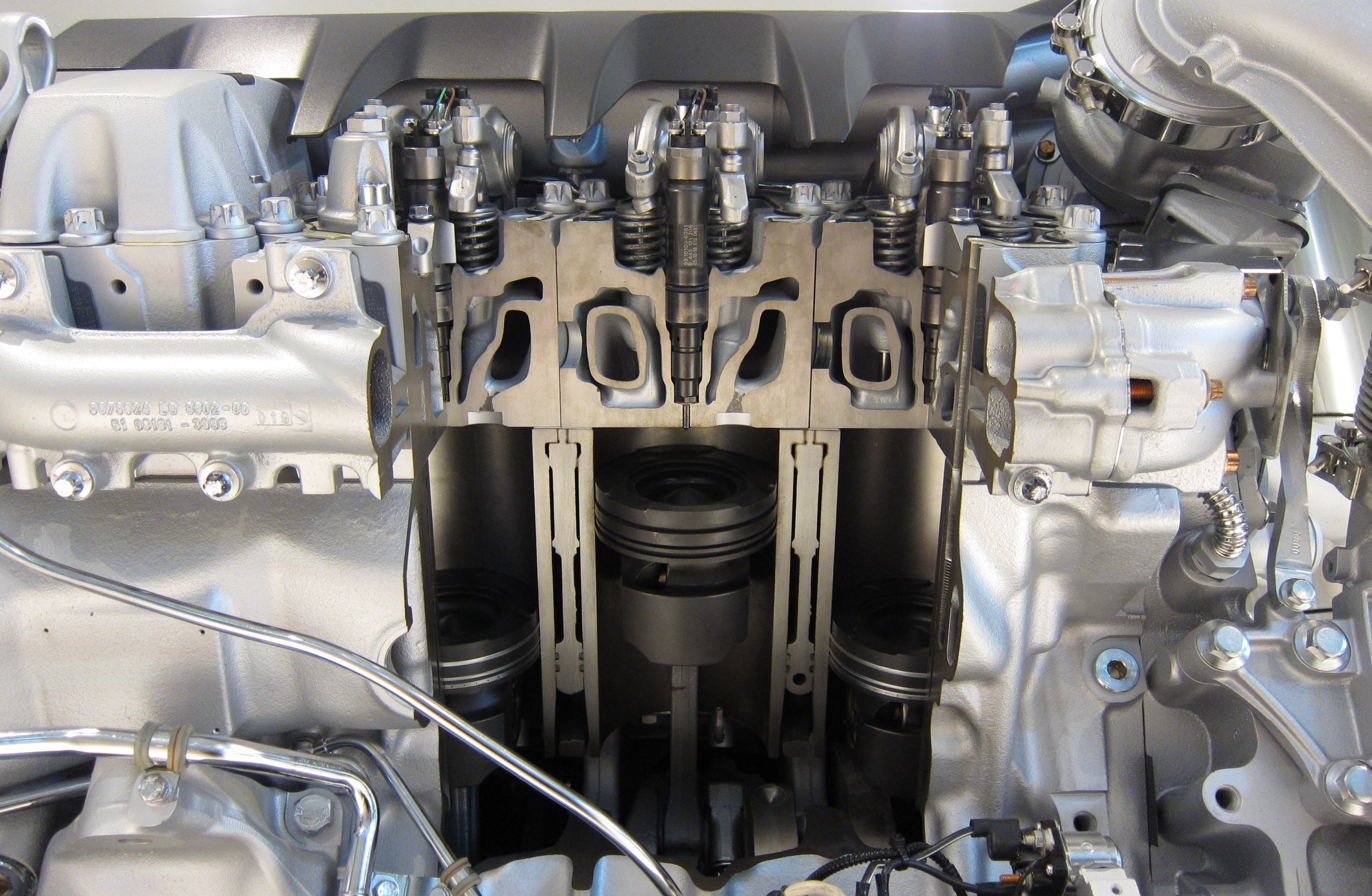
Diesel fuel injector as installed in a MAN V8 Diesel engine

Common rail direct fuel injection is a direct fuel injection system built around a high-pressure fuel rail feeding solenoid valves. This pressure is typically over 2,000 bar (200 MPa; 29,000 psi). A common rail system contrasts with the low-pressure fuel pump feeding unit injectors (or pump nozzles). High-pressure injection delivers power and fuel consumption benefits over earlier lower pressure fuel injection, by injecting fuel as a larger number of smaller droplets, giving a much higher ratio of surface area to volume. This provides improved vaporization from the surface of the fuel droplets, and so more efficient combining of atmospheric oxygen with vaporized fuel delivering more complete combustion.

Common rail injection is widely used in diesel engines. It is also the basis of gasoline direct injection systems used on petrol engines.

== History ==
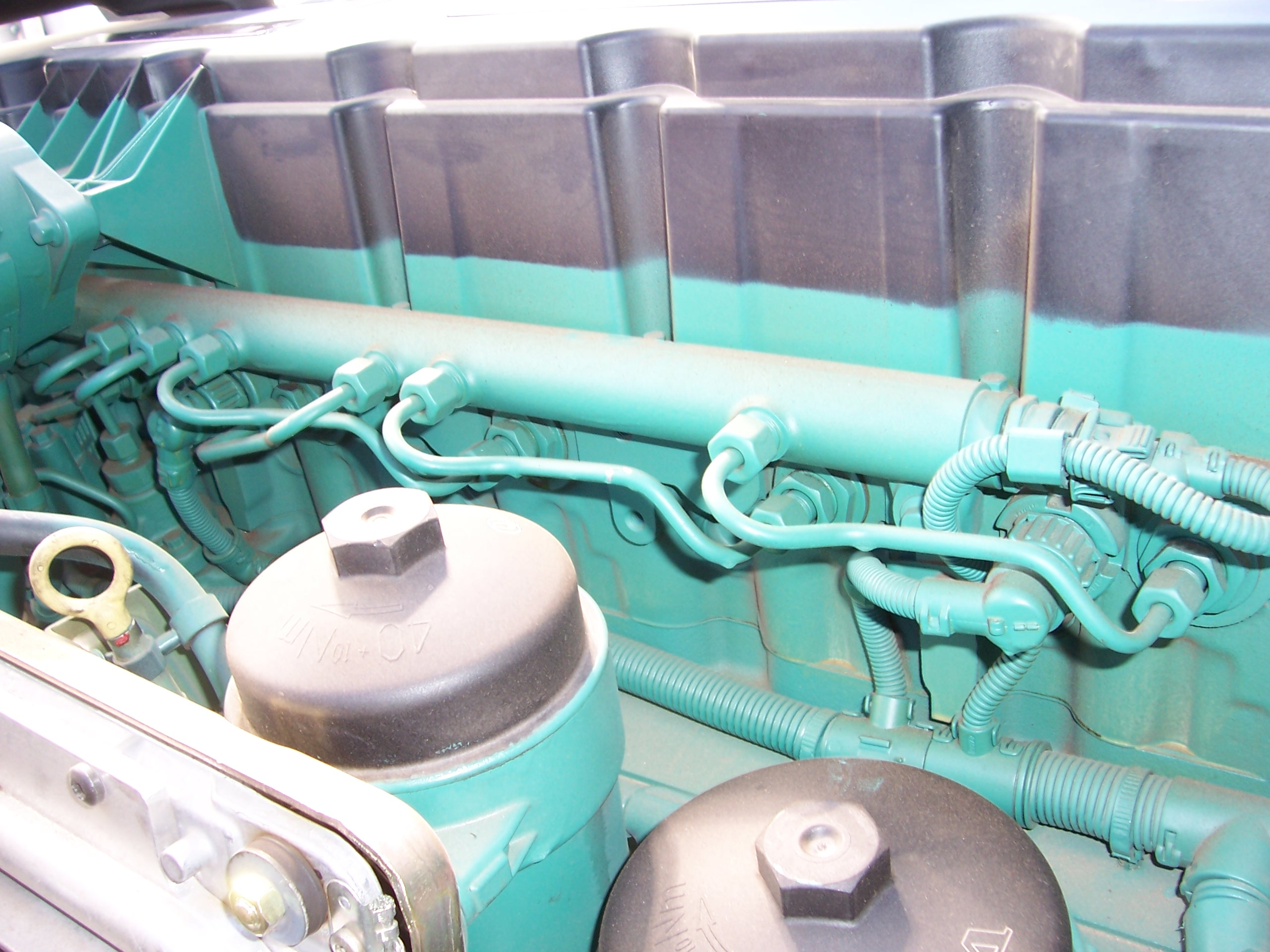
Common rail fuel system on a Volvo truck engine

In 1916 Vickers pioneered the use of mechanical common rail systems in G-class submarine engines. For every 90° of rotation, four plunger pumps allowed a constant injection pressure of 3,000 pounds per square inch (210 bar; 21 MPa), with fuel delivery to individual cylinders being shut off by valves in the injector lines. From 1921 to 1980 Doxford Engines used a common rail system in their opposed-piston marine engines, where a multicylinder reciprocating fuel pump generated a pressure around 600 bars (60 MPa; 8,700 psi), with fuel stored in accumulator bottles. Pressure control was achieved by an adjustable pump discharge stroke and a "spill valve". Camshaft-operated mechanical timing valves were used to supply the spring-loaded Brice/CAV/Lucas injectors, which injected through the side of the cylinder into the chamber formed between the pistons. Early engines had a pair of timing cams, one for ahead running and one for astern. Later engines had two injectors per cylinder, and the final series of constant-pressure turbocharged engines was fitted with four. This system was used for the injection of both diesel and heavy fuel oil (600cSt heated to a temperature near 130 °C).

Common rail engines have been used in marine and locomotive applications for some time. The Cooper-Bessemer GN-8 (circa 1942) is an example of a hydraulically operated common rail diesel engine, also known as a modified common rail.

The common rail system prototype for automotive engines was developed in the late 1960s by Robert Huber of Switzerland, and the technology was further developed by Dr. Marco Ganser at the Swiss Federal Institute of Technology in Zurich, later of Ganser-Hydromag AG (est. 1995) in Oberägeri.

The first common-rail-Diesel-engine used in a road vehicle was the MN 106-engine by East German VEB IFA Motorenwerke Nordhausen. It was built into a single IFA W50 in 1985. Due to a lack of funding, the development was cancelled and mass production was never achieved.

The first successful mass production vehicle with common rail, was sold in Japan in 1995. Dr. Shohei Itoh and Masahiko Miyaki of the Denso Corporation developed the ECD-U2 common rail system, mounted on the Hino Ranger truck. Denso claims the first commercial high-pressure common rail system in 1995.

Modern common rail systems are governed by an engine control unit, which controls injectors electrically rather than mechanically. Prototyped in the 1990s by Magneti Marelli, Centro Ricerche Fiat in Bari, and Elasis, with further development by physicist Mario Ricco Fiat Group. Unfortunately Fiat were in a poor financial state at this time, so the design was acquired by Robert Bosch GmbH for refinement and mass production. The first passenger car to use this system was the 1997 Alfa Romeo 156 with a 2.4-L JTD engine, and later that same year, Mercedes-Benz introduced it in their W202 model. In 2001, common rail injection made its way into pickup trucks with the introduction of the 6.6 liter Duramax LB7 V8 used in the Chevrolet Silverado HD and GMC Sierra HD. In 2003 Dodge and Cummins launched common rail engines, and Ford followed in 2008 with the 6.4L Powerstroke. Today almost all non-commercial diesel vehicles use common rail systems.

== Applications ==
The common rail system is suitable for all types of road cars with diesel engines, ranging from city cars (such as the Fiat Panda) to executive cars (such as the Audi A8). The main suppliers of modern common rail systems are Bosch, Delphi Technologies, Denso, and Siemens VDO (now owned by Continental AG).

== Acronyms and branding used ==
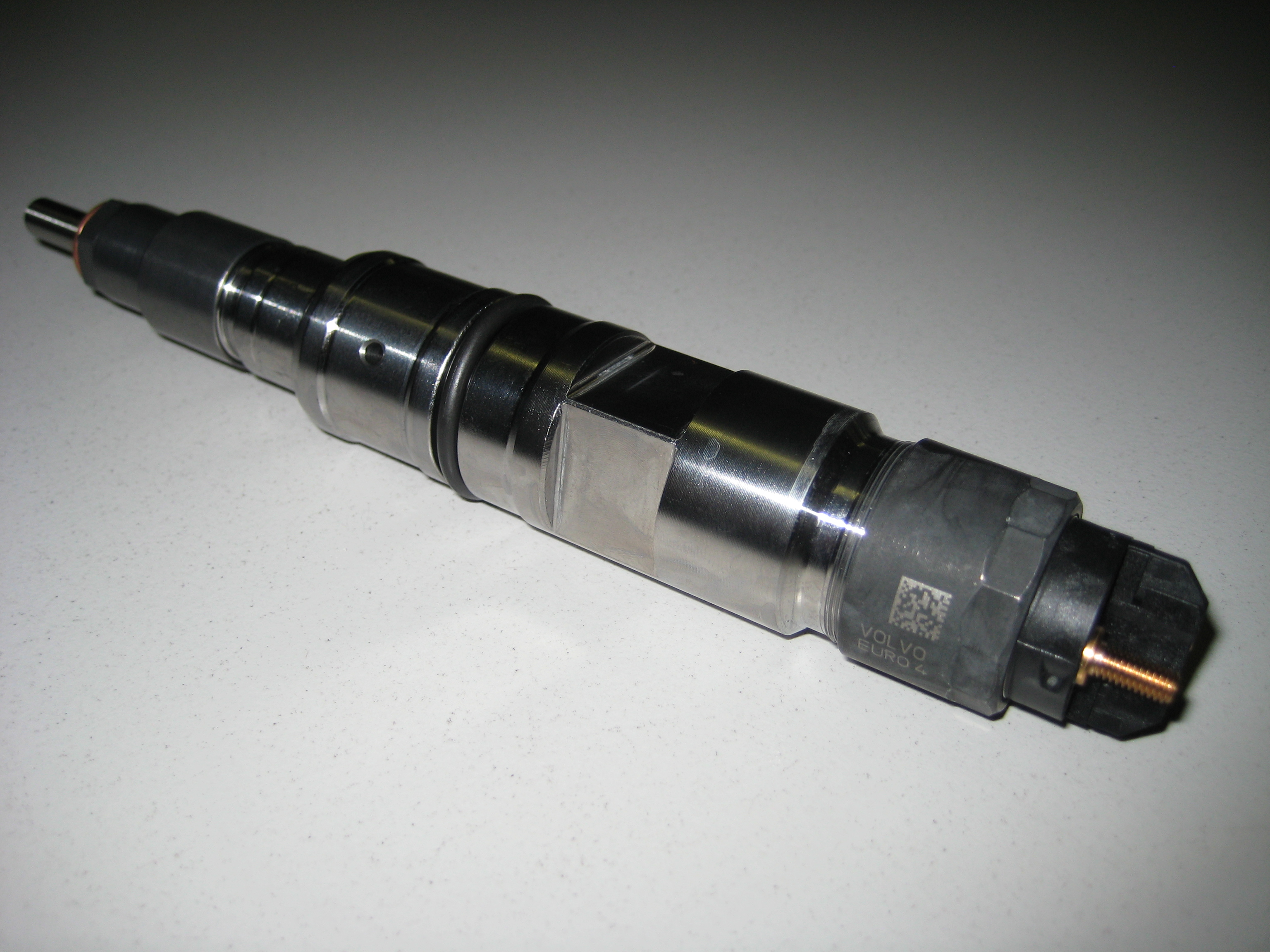
Bosch common rail diesel fuel injector from a Volvo truck engine

The automotive manufacturers refer to their common rail engines by their own brand names:

- Ashok Leyland: CRS (used in U Truck and E4 Busses)
- Audi: TDI, BiTDi The "Bi" stands for BiTurbo
- BMW Group (BMW and Mini): d (also used in the Land Rover Freelander as TD4 and the Rover 75 and MG ZT as CDT and CDTi), D and SD
- Chrysler CRD
- Citroën: HDi, e-HDi and BlueHDi
- Cummins and Scania: XPI (developed under joint venture)
- Cummins: CCR (Cummins pump with Bosch injectors)
- Daimler: CDI
- Fiat Group (Fiat, Alfa Romeo and Lancia): JTD (also branded as MultiJet, JTDm, and by supplied manufacturers as TDi, CDTi, TCDi, TiD, TTiD, DDiS and QuadraJet)
- Ford Motor Company: TDCi (Duratorq and Powerstroke) and EcoBlue Diesel
- GM: VCDi (licensed from VM Motori) Duramax Diesel, Diesel and CTDI
- Honda: i-CTDI and i-DTEC
- Hyundai, Kia and Genesis: CRDi
- IKCO: EFD
- Isuzu: iTEQ, Ddi and DI TURBO
- Jaguar: d
- Jeep: CRD and EcoDiesel
- Komatsu: Tier3, Tier4, 4D95 and higher HPCR-series
- Land Rover: TD4, eD4, SD4, TD6, TDV6, SDV6, TDV8, SDV8
- Lexus: d (e.g. 450d and 220d)
- Mahindra: CRDe, m2DiCR, mEagle, mHawk, mFalcon and mPower (Trucks)
- Maserati: Diesel
- Mazda: MZR-CD and Skyactiv-D (some MZR-CD engines are manufactured by the Ford and PSA Peugeot Citroën joint venture) and earlier DiTD
- Mercedes-Benz: CDI and d
- Mitsubishi: Di-D
- Nissan: DDTi
- Opel/Vauxhall: DTI, CDTI, BiTurbo CDTI, CRI, Turbo D and BiTurbo D
- Porsche: Diesel
- Proton: SCDi
- Groupe PSA (Peugeot, Citroën and DS): HDi, e-HDi or BlueHDi (developed under joint venture with Ford) – See PSA HDi engine
- Renault, Dacia and Nissan: dCi and BLUEdCi (Infiniti uses some dCi engines as part of the Renault-Nissan Alliance, branded d)
- Saab: TiD (The 2.2 turbo diesel engine was also called "TiD", but it didn't have Common rail) and TTiD The double "T" stands for Twin-Turbo
- SsangYong: XDi, eXDI, XVT or D
- Subaru: TD, D or BOXER DIESEL (as of Jan 2008)
- Suzuki: DDiS
- Tata: 2.2 VTT DiCOR (used in large SUV-class such as Safari), VARICOR (used in large SUV-class such as Safari Storme, Aria and Hexa),1.05 Revotorq CR3 (used in Tiago and Tigor) 1.5 Revotorq CR05 (used in Nexon and Altroz), 1.4 CR4 (used in Indica, Indigo), 3.0 CR4 (used in Sumo gold) 1.3 Quadrajet (supplied by Fiat and used in Indica Vista, Indigo Manza and Zest), and 2.0 Kryotec (also supplied by Fiat and used in SUV Harrier and All new Safari),3.3 L Turbotronn and 5L Turbotronn ( used in M&HCV Trucks).
- Toyota: D4-D
- Volkswagen Group (Volkswagen, Audi, SEAT and Škoda): TDI (more recent models use common rail, as opposed to the earlier unit injector engines). Bentley term their Bentayga diesel simply Diesel
- Volvo: D, D2, D3, D4 and D5 engines (some are manufactured by Ford and PSA Peugeot Citroën), Volvo Penta D-series engines

== Principles ==
Diagram of the common rail system

Solenoid or piezoelectric valves make possible fine electronic control over the fuel-injection time and quantity, and the higher pressure that the common rail technology makes available provides better fuel atomisation. To lower engine noise, the engine's electronic control unit can inject a small amount of diesel just before the main injection event ("pilot" injection), thus reducing its explosiveness and vibration, as well as optimising injection timing and quantity for variations in fuel quality, cold starting, and so on. Some advanced common rail fuel systems perform as many as five injections per stroke.

Common rail engines require a very short to no heating-up time, depending on the ambient temperature, and produce lower engine noise and emissions than older systems.

Diesel engines have historically used various forms of fuel injection. Two common types include the unit-injection system and the distributor/inline-pump systems. While these older systems provide accurate fuel quantity and injection timing control, they are limited by several factors:

- They are cam driven, and injection pressure is proportional to engine speed. This typically means that the highest injection pressure can only be achieved at the highest engine speed and the maximum achievable injection pressure decreases as engine speed decreases. This relationship is true with all pumps, even those used on common rail systems. With unit or distributor systems, the injection pressure is tied to the instantaneous pressure of a single pumping event with no accumulator, thus the relationship is more prominent and troublesome.
- They are limited in the number and timing of injection events that can be commanded during a single combustion event. While multiple injection events are possible with these older systems, it is much more difficult and costly to achieve.
- For the typical distributor/inline system, the start of injection occurs at a predetermined pressure (often referred to as pop pressure) and ends at a predetermined pressure. This characteristic results from "dumb" injectors in the cylinder head which open and close at pressures determined by the spring preload applied to the plunger in the injector. Once the pressure in the injector reaches a predetermined level, the plunger lifts and injection starts.

In common rail systems, a high-pressure pump stores a reservoir of fuel at high pressure—up to and above 2,000 bars (200 MPa; 29,000 psi). The term "common rail" refers to the fact that all of the fuel injectors are supplied by a common fuel rail which is nothing more than a pressure accumulator where the fuel is stored at high pressure. This accumulator supplies multiple fuel injectors with high-pressure fuel. This simplifies the purpose of the high-pressure pump in that it only needs to maintain a target pressure (either mechanically or electronically controlled). The fuel injectors are typically controlled by the engine control unit (ECU). When the fuel injectors are electrically activated, a hydraulic valve (consisting of a nozzle and plunger) is mechanically or hydraulically opened and fuel is sprayed into the cylinders at the desired pressure. Since the fuel pressure energy is stored remotely and the injectors are electrically actuated, the injection pressure at the start and end of injection is very near the pressure in the accumulator (rail), thus producing a square injection rate. If the accumulator, pump, and plumbing are sized properly, the injection pressure and rate will be the same for each of the multiple injection events.

Third-generation common rail diesels now feature piezoelectric injectors for increased precision, with fuel pressures up to 2,500 bar (250 MPa; 36,000 psi).

== See also ==
- Hydraulically actuated electronic unit injection
- Unit pump
- Water sensor
