= Tata Cliffrider =

Overview
- Manufacturer: Tata Motors

Body and chassis
- Class: Truck
- Body style: 4-door Pickup
- Related: Tata Xover

The Tata Cliffrider is a concept car that was first introduced by Tata Motors at the Geneva Motor Show in 2006.

Its exterior is designed by modifying the Xover concept. Its rear doors slide backward like an MPV. Its interior is derived from the Xover concept. Its load body is protected by a sliding cover. It offers either a Euro IV DICOR engine and V6 petrol engine. It has airbags, an anti lock-braking system, traction control, and navigation control. It is available in both 4X4 and 4X2.
