= Gema Switzerland =

Gema Switzerland GmbH
- Industry: Machines Electro and Metal
- Founded: 1897
- Headquarters: Gossau, Schweiz
- Key people: Claudio Merengo (CEO)
- Number of employees: 200 in headquarters Gossau (2012)
- Website: www.gemapowdercoating.com

Gema Switzerland, based in Gossau SG, is an international supplier of electrostatic powder coating equipment. The products range from manual coating to fully automated powder coating. Since 2012, Gema has been a part of the Graco Group, a worldwide supplier of liquid conveyance systems and components.

== Awards ==
- 1976: IF Product Design Award for the electrostatic powder coating device type 721.
- 2006: IF Product Design Award for the manual gun OptiFlex.
- 2014: Red Dot Design Award for the automatic gun OptiGun GA03 in the category Product Design.
