= Graco =

Graco may refer to:

- Graco (baby products)
- Graco (fluid handling)
- Graco Ramirez
