= Grease gun =

Tool for applying grease

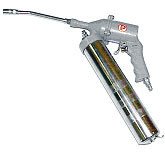
A grease gun (pneumatic)

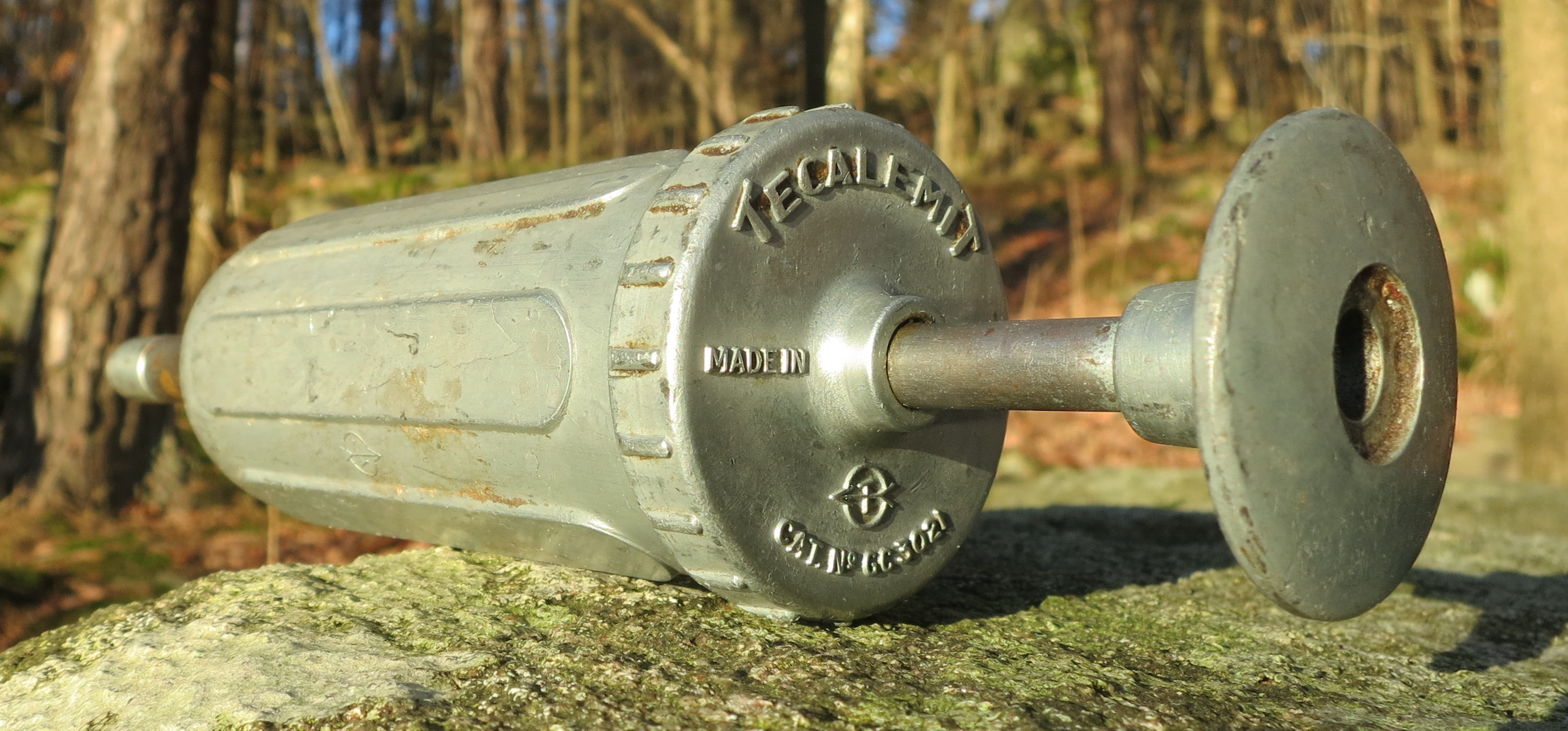
Hand-powered 1950s grease gun

A grease gun is a common workshop and garage tool used for lubrication. The purpose of the grease gun is to apply lubricant through an aperture to a specific point, usually from a grease cartridge to a grease fitting. The channels behind the grease fitting lead to where the lubrication is needed. The aperture may be of a type that fits closely with a receiving aperture on any number of mechanical devices. The close fitting of the apertures ensures that lubricant is applied only where needed. There are four types of grease gun:

1. Hand-powered, where the grease is forced from the aperture by back-pressure built up by hand-cranking the trigger mechanism of the gun, which applies pressure to a spring mechanism behind the lubricant, thus forcing grease through the aperture.
2. Hand-powered, where there is no trigger mechanism, and the grease is forced through the aperture by the back-pressure built up by pushing on the butt of the grease gun, which slides a piston through the body of the tool, pumping grease out of the aperture.
3. Air-powered (pneumatic), where compressed air is directed to the gun by hoses, the air pressure serving to force the grease through the aperture. Russell Gray, inventor of the air-powered grease gun, founded Graco based on this invention.
4. Electric, where an electric motor drives a high-pressure grease pump. These are often battery-powered for portability.

The grease gun is charged or loaded with any of the various types of lubricants, but usually a thicker heavier type of grease is used.

It was a close resemblance to contemporary hand-powered grease guns that gave the nickname to the World War II-era M3 submachine gun.

== See also ==
- Drum pump
- Grease gun injury
