= Tata Hexa =

Mid-size crossover SUV

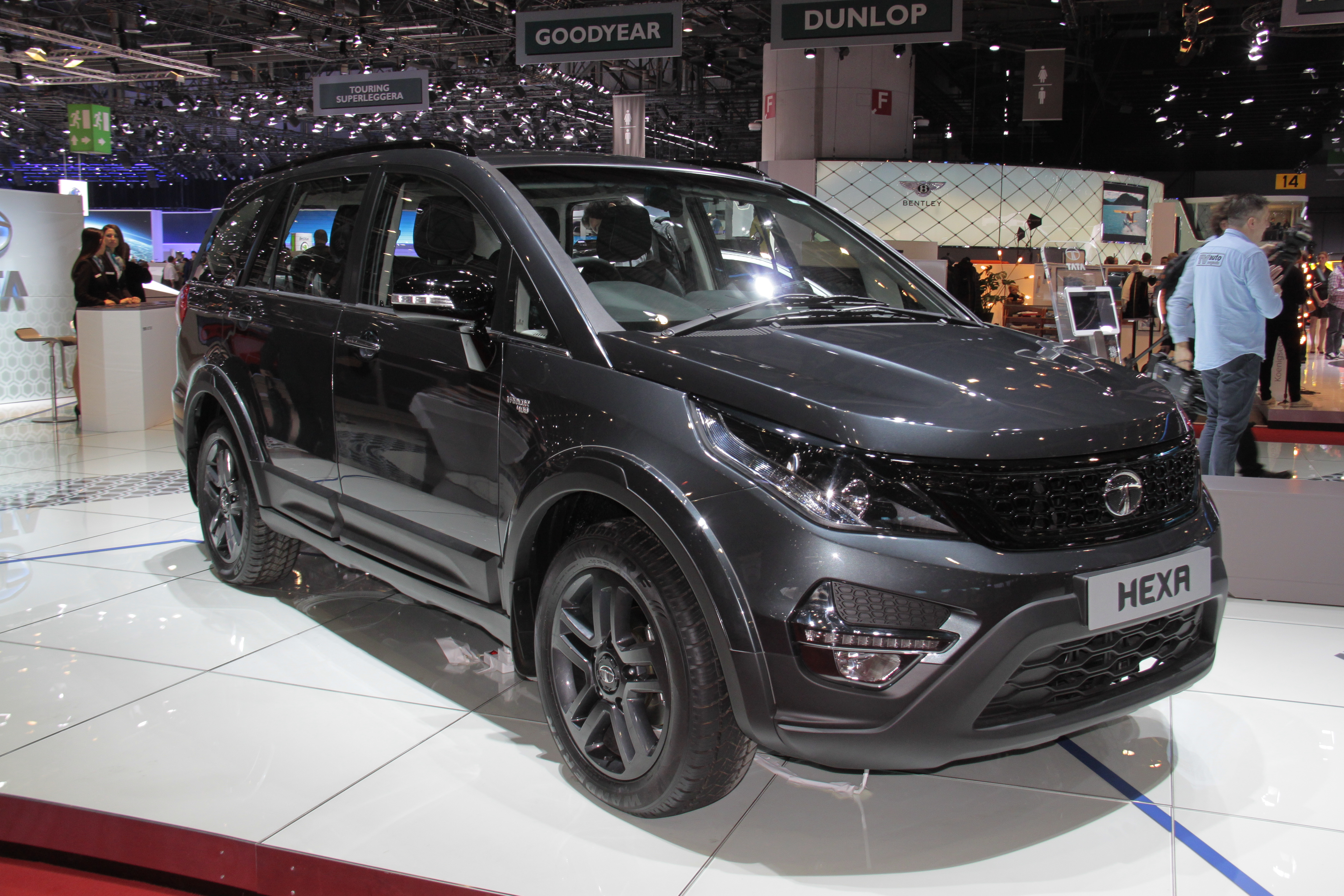

Overview
- Manufacturer: Tata Motors
- Production: 2016–2020
- Assembly: India: Pune

Body and chassis
- Class: Mid-size crossover SUV
- Body style: 5-door SUV
- Layout: Front-engine, rear-wheel-drive; Front-engine, four-wheel-drive
- Platform: Tata X2
- Related: Tata Aria

Powertrain
- Engine: 2.2 L DW12 Varicor I4-T (diesel)
- Transmission: 5-speed manual; 6-speed manual; 6-speed GM 6L 50 MYB automatic

Dimensions
- Wheelbase: 2,850 mm (112.2 in)
- Length: 4,788 mm (188.5 in)
- Width: 1,900 mm (74.8 in)
- Height: 1,785 mm (70.3 in)

Chronology
- Predecessor: Tata Aria
- Successor: Tata Safari (2021)

The Tata Hexa is a mid-size crossover SUV manufactured by Indian passenger and commercial vehicle manufacturer Tata Motors between 2017 and 2020. A heavily reworked Tata Aria, the Hexa was originally unveiled at the 2016 Geneva International Motor Show and was launched into the Indian market in January 2017.

The Hexa used Tata's Impact design language, also used in Tata Tiago, Tata Tigor, Tata Nexon and the Tata Harrier. The company used its three design studios in India, the UK, and Italy for designing cars in this design framework.

== Overview ==
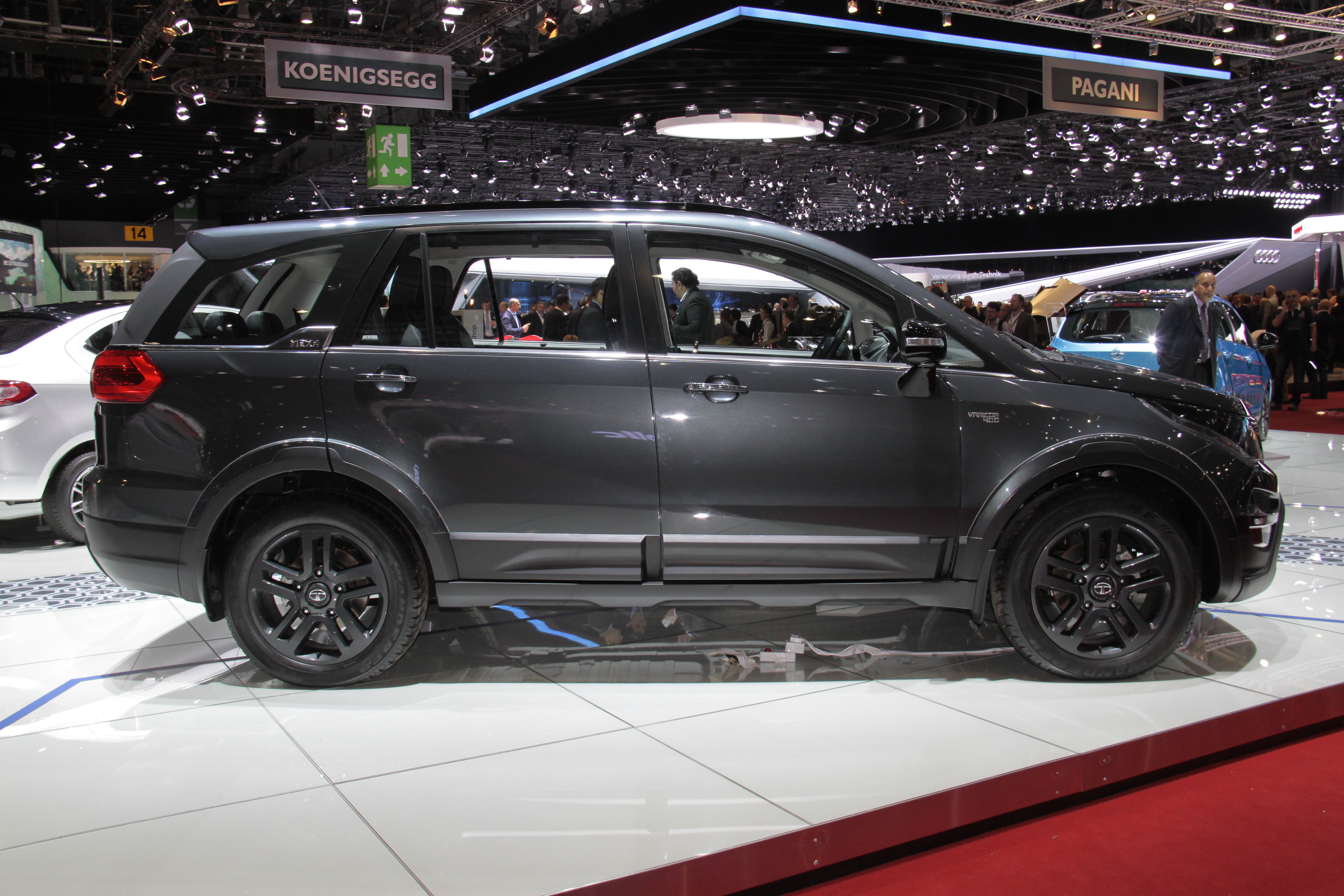
Side view

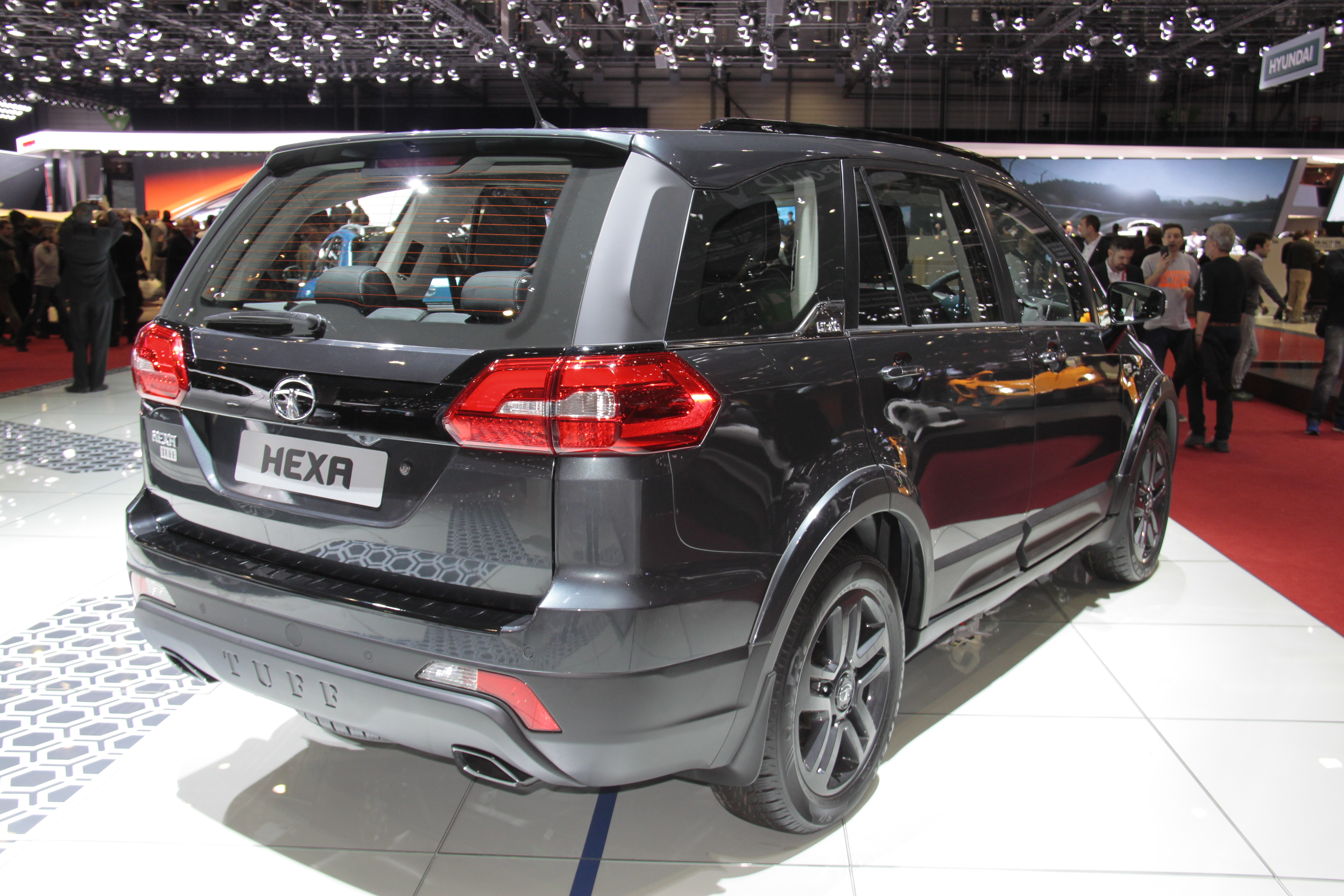
Rear view

The Tata Hexa was available with a 2.2-liter Diesel engine, either rear-wheel drive or all-wheel-drive, and shipped in a number of versions with varying interior and exterior features, as well as different engine power and torque output. Both manual and automatic transmissions were marketed.

The Tata Hexa came with 6 variants at launch. The Base model, the XE, came equipped with the 2.2L Varicor 320, while the rest of the lineup, consisting of the XM, XMA, XT, XTA, and XT 4x4, all came with the 2.2L Varicor 400. The range topping trim, the XT 4x4, came with a Borg Warner sourced Torque-on-Demand type Transfer Case paired with a 6 speed manual transmission. The XMA and XTA came with the Punch Powerglide 6L50 Automatic Transmission. The Hexa was not offered with an Automatic 4x4 variant throughout its life. In 2018, a XM+ variant was launched to fill the wide gap between the top end XT variant and the mid XM variant.

As the Indian market did not receive it well and it failed to make a significant impact on the sales of its closest rivals such as the Toyota Innova and the Mahindra XUV 500, despite having an overall more premium and complete package, production of the Tata Hexa was halted in 2020 with the implementation of BS6 emission standards in India.

== Variants ==
Model	Engine	Displacement	Transmission	Power	Torque
XE	2.2 L Varicor 320 4 cylinder Diesel engine (CRDi)	2179cc	5-speed manual	110.32 kW (150 PS)@4000 rpm	320 Nm@1500-3000 rpm
XM XM+ XT XT 4x4	2.2 L Varicor 400 4 cylinder Diesel engine (CRDi)	2179cc	6-speed manual	114.73 kW (156 PS)@4000 rpm	400 Nm@1750-2500 rpm
XMA XTA	2.2 L Varicor 400 4 cylinder Diesel engine (CRDi)	2179cc	6-speed automatic	114.73 kW (156 PS)@4000 rpm	400 Nm@1750-2500 rpm
