= High pressure injection injury =

- Other names: Grease gun injury, injection injury
- Specialty: Emergency medicine, plastic surgery

A high pressure injection injury is an injury caused by high-pressure injection of oil, grease, diesel fuel, gasoline, solvents, water, liquified plastic or even air, into the body. The most common causes are accidents with grease guns, paint sprayers, and pressure washers, but working on diesel and gasoline engine fuel injection systems as well as pinhole leaks in pressurized hydraulic lines can also cause this injury. Additionally, there is at least one known case of deliberate self-injection with a grease gun.

Although the initial wound often seems minor, the unseen, internal damage can be severe. With hydraulic fluids, paint, and detergents, these injuries are extremely serious as most hydraulic fluids and organic solvents are highly toxic. Delay in surgical treatment often leads to amputations or death. But even with pure water or air, these injuries cause compartment syndrome, which leads to cell death if surgical intervention is delayed.

== Signs and symptoms ==
Small punctate lesions may be the only skin lesions visible at first, and there may not be any discomfort. Such a benign presentation of painless wounds may cause the patient to postpone getting medical attention. But as the swelling increases, loss of perfusion causes pain and paresthesia, and the finger becomes bloated, pale, edematous, tense, and cold.

== Causes ==
Most injuries are caused by inexperience using high-pressure equipment, improper use, inadequate training, negligence, exhaustion at the end of the shift, or equipment rupture. Paints, paint solvents, grease, and fuel oils (diesel, paraffin, and gasoline) are the substances that are injected the most frequently, but reports of injecting water, air, cement, and animal vaccines have also been made.

The majority of high-pressure guns and injectors reach pressures of 2000 to 12000 pounds per square inch (psi), but ejection pressures of only 100 psi are sufficient to penetrate human skin.

== Treatment ==
Analgesia, systemic prophylactic antibiotics, elevation of the affected limb, and tetanus prophylaxis if necessary are all part of the initial management. Avoiding digital blocks is advised because they could exacerbate vasospasm and swelling in a digit that is already at risk. In the emergency department, wounds should be left open without any attempt at primary closure. Ice is also discouraged because the goal is to maximize the hand's perfusion after injection.

Only injections of chicken vaccine, air, or water qualify for nonsurgical treatment; expectant management of these injuries is an option. Surgical decompression is only necessary for high-pressure water injuries in cases where compartment syndrome symptoms are present.

== Epidemiology ==
With an estimated frequency of one in 600 injuries presenting to a hospital, these injuries are rare. These injuries mostly affect young men and are related to the workplace.

== See also ==
- Jet injector § History
