= Unit injector =

Fuel injection system for diesel engines

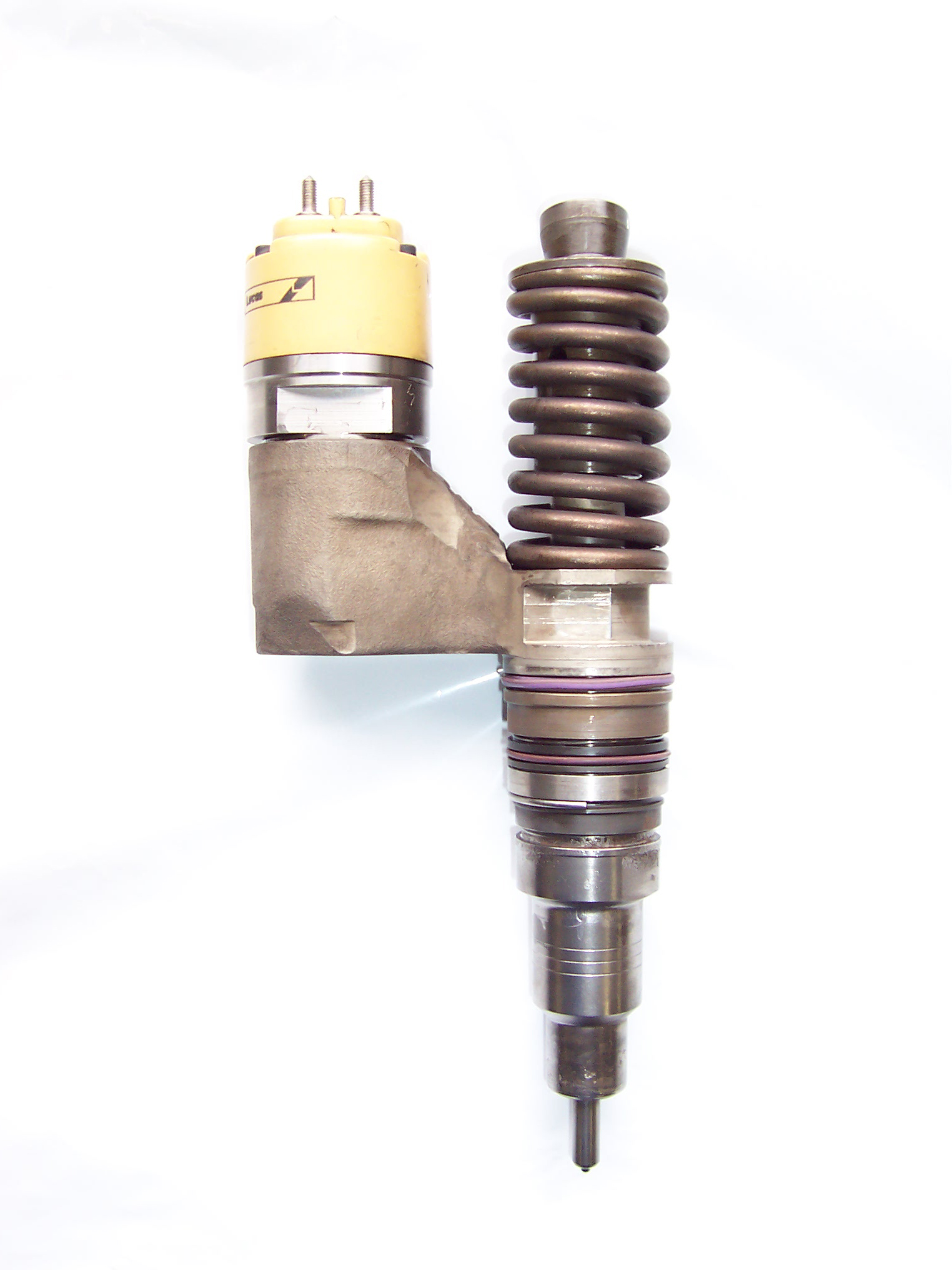
Early Lucas electronic diesel unit injector

A unit injector (UI) is a high-pressure integrated direct fuel injection system for diesel engines, combining the injector nozzle and the injection pump in a single component. The plunger pump used is usually driven by a shared camshaft. In a unit injector, the device is typically lubricated and cooled by the fuel itself.

High-pressure injection delivers power and fuel consumption benefits over earlier lower-pressure fuel injection by injecting fuel as a larger number of smaller droplets, giving a much higher ratio of surface area to volume. This provides improved vaporisation from the surface of the fuel droplets and so more efficient combining of atmospheric oxygen with vaporised fuel, delivering more complete and cleaner combustion.

== History ==
In 1911, a patent was issued in Great Britain for a unit injector resembling those in use today to Frederick Lamplough.

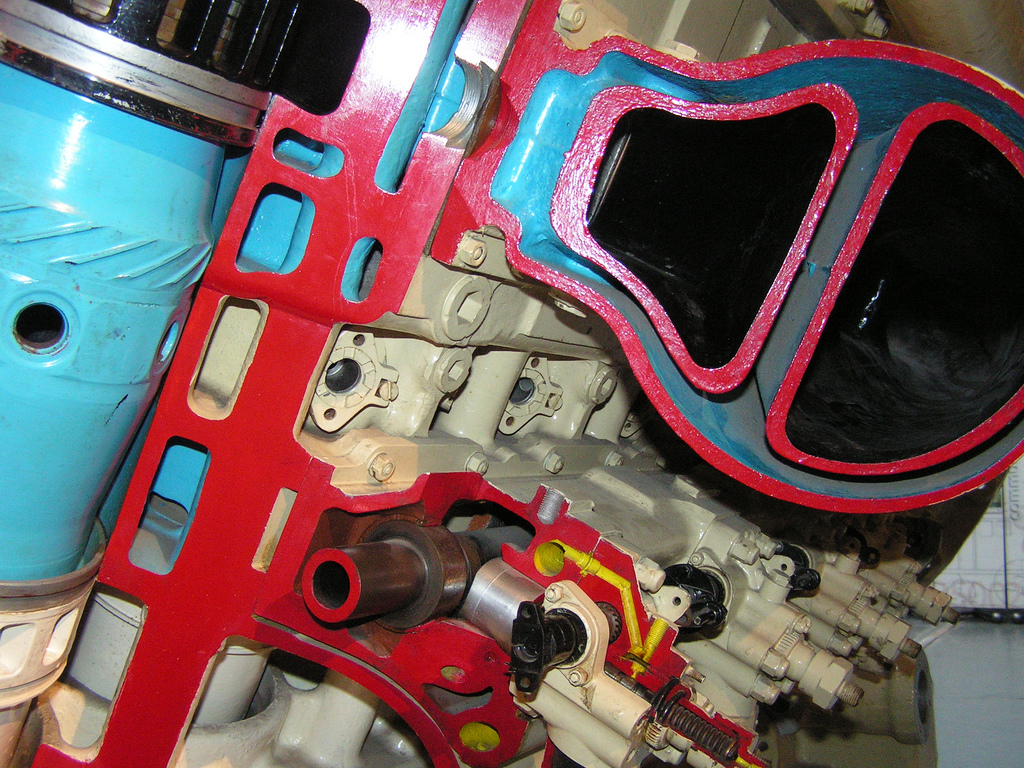
Napier Deltic opposed-piston two-stroke, sectioned. The unit injectors are low down, below the yellow fuel passages, driven by a camshaft to their left and injecting into the centre of the cylinder liner (pale blue).

Commercial usage of unit injectors in the U.S. began in early 1930s on Winton engines powering locomotives, boats, even US Navy submarines, and in 1934, Arthur Fielden was granted U.S. patent No.1,981,913 on the unit injector design later used for the General Motors two-stroke diesel engines. Most mid-sized diesel engines used a single pump and separate injectors, but some makers, such as Detroit Diesel and Electro-Motive Diesel became well known for favouring unit injectors, in which the high-pressure pump is contained within the injector itself. E.W. Kettering's 1951 ASME presentation goes into detail about the development of the modern Unit injector. Also Cummins PT (pressure-time) is a form of unit injection where the fuel injectors are on a common rail fed by a low-pressure pump and the injectors are actuated by a third lobe on the camshaft. The pressure determines how much fuel the injectors get and the time is determined by the cam.

In 1994, Robert Bosch GmbH supplied the first electronic unit injector for commercial vehicles, and other manufacturers soon followed. In 1995, Electromotive Diesel converted its 710 diesel engines to electronic fuel injection, using an EUI which replaces the UI.

Today, major manufacturers include Robert Bosch GmbH, CAT, Cummins, ⁣ Delphi, ⁣ Detroit Diesel, Electro-Motive Diesel.

== Design and technology ==
The design of the unit injector eliminates the need for high-pressure fuel pipes, and with that, their associated failures, as well as allowing for much higher injection pressure to occur. The unit injector system allows accurate injection timing, and amount of control as in the common rail system .

The unit injector is fitted into the engine cylinder head, where the fuel is supplied via integral ducts machined directly into the cylinder head. Each injector has its own pumping element, and in the case of electronic control, a fuel solenoid valve as well. The fuel system is divided into the low-pressure (<500 kPa) fuel supply system, and the high-pressure injection system (<2000 bar).

== Operation principle ==
Animated cut through diagram of a typical fuel injector (click to see animation)

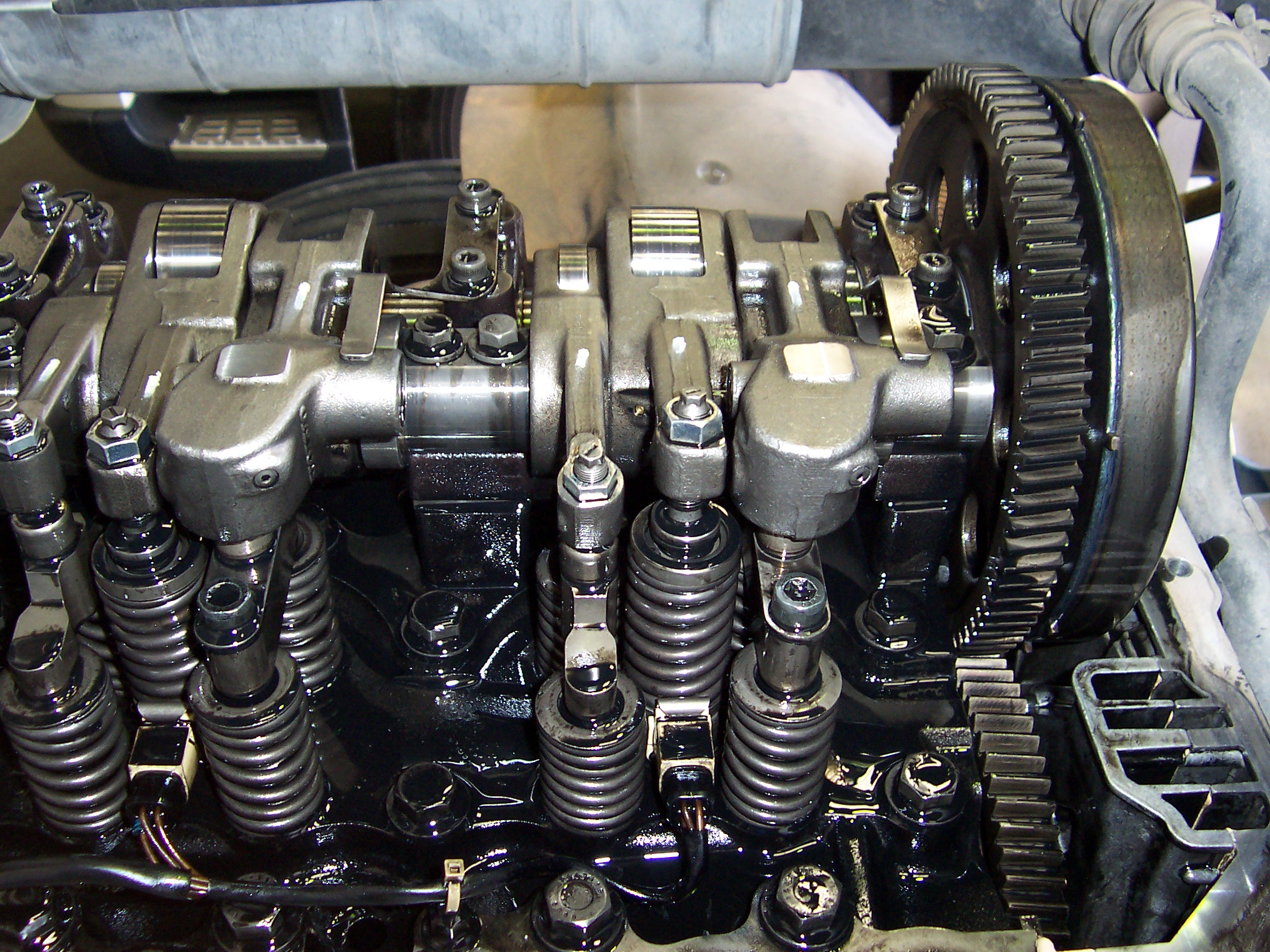
Delphi E1 UI on the Volvo D13A engine

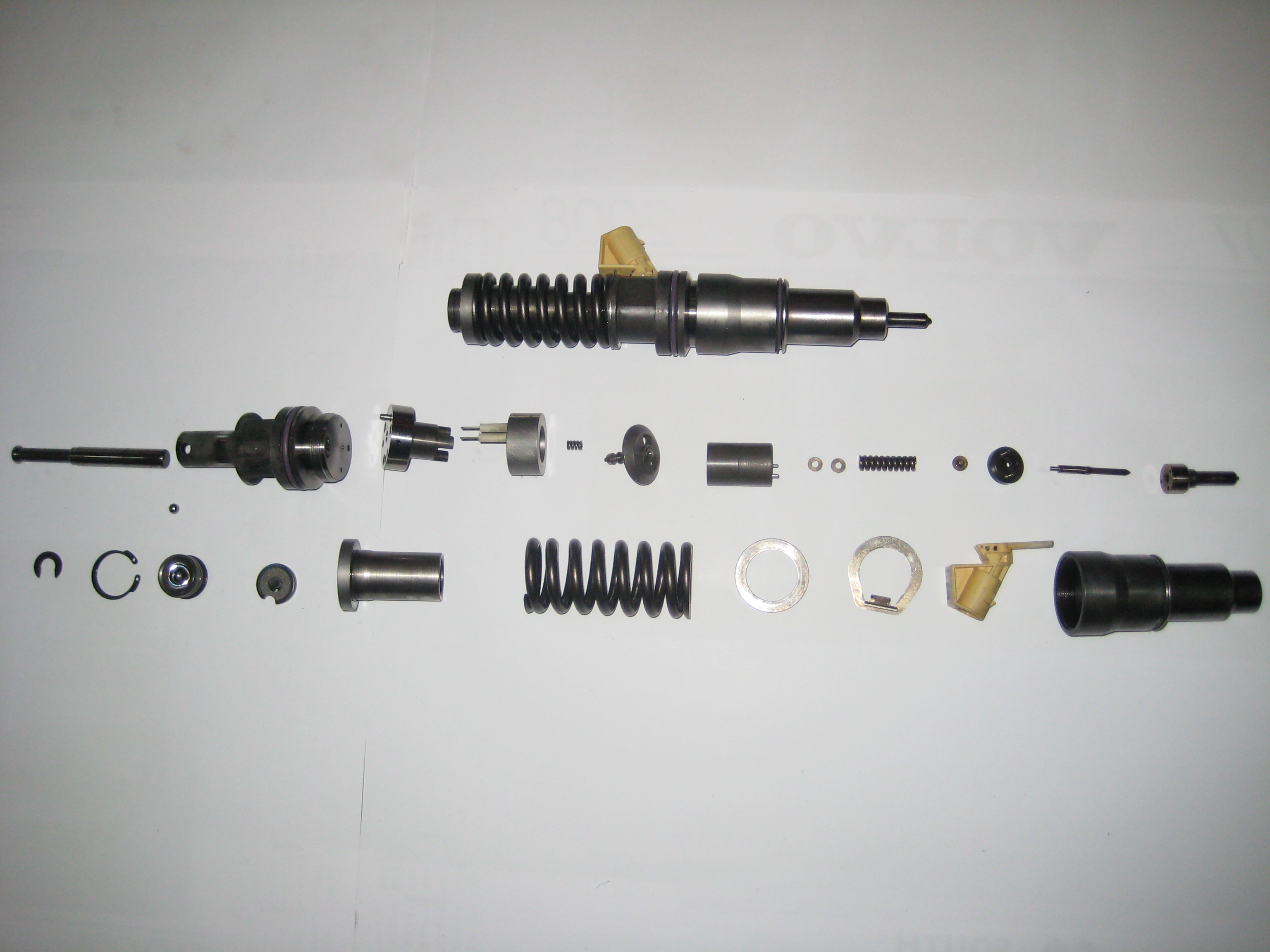
Delphi E1 unit injector parts

The basic operation can be described as a sequence of four separate phases: the filling phase, the spill phase, the injection phase, and the pressure reduction phase.

A low-pressure fuel delivery pump supplies filtered diesel fuel into the cylinder head fuel ducts, and into each injector fuel port of constant stroke pump plunger injector, which is overhead camshaft operated.

Fill phase
The constant stroke pump element on the way up draws fuel from the supply duct in to the chamber, and as long as the electric solenoid valve remains de-energized the fuel line is open.
Spill phase
The pump element is on the way down, and as long as the solenoid valve remains de-energized the fuel line is open and fuel flows in into the return duct.
Injection phase
The pump element is still on the way down, the solenoid is now energised and the fuel line is immediately closed. The fuel cannot pass back into the return duct, and is now compressed by the plunger until pressure exceeds specific “opening” pressure, and the injector nozzle needle lifts, allowing fuel to be injected into the combustion chamber.
Pressure reduction phase
The plunger is still on its way down, the engine ECU de-energizes the solenoid when the required quantity of fuel is delivered. The fuel valve opens, fuel can flow back into the return duct, causing the pressure to drop. Which in turn causes the injector nozzle needle to shut; hence no more fuel is injected.

Summary
The start of an injection is controlled by the solenoid closing point, and the injected fuel quantity is determined by the closing time, which is the length of time the solenoid remains closed. The solenoid operation is fully controlled by the engine ECU.

== Additional functions ==
The use of electronic control allows for special functions; such as temperature controlled injection timing, cylinder balancing (smooth idle), switching off individual cylinders under part load for further reduction in emissions and fuel consumption, and multi-pulse injection (more than one injection occurrence during one engine cycle).

== Usage & Applications ==
Unit injector fuel systems are being used on a wide variety of vehicles and engines; commercial vehicles from manufacturers such as Volvo, Cummins, Detroit Diesel, CAT, Navistar International and passenger vehicles from manufacturers such as Land Rover and Volkswagen Group, among others, and locomotives from Electro-Motive Diesel.

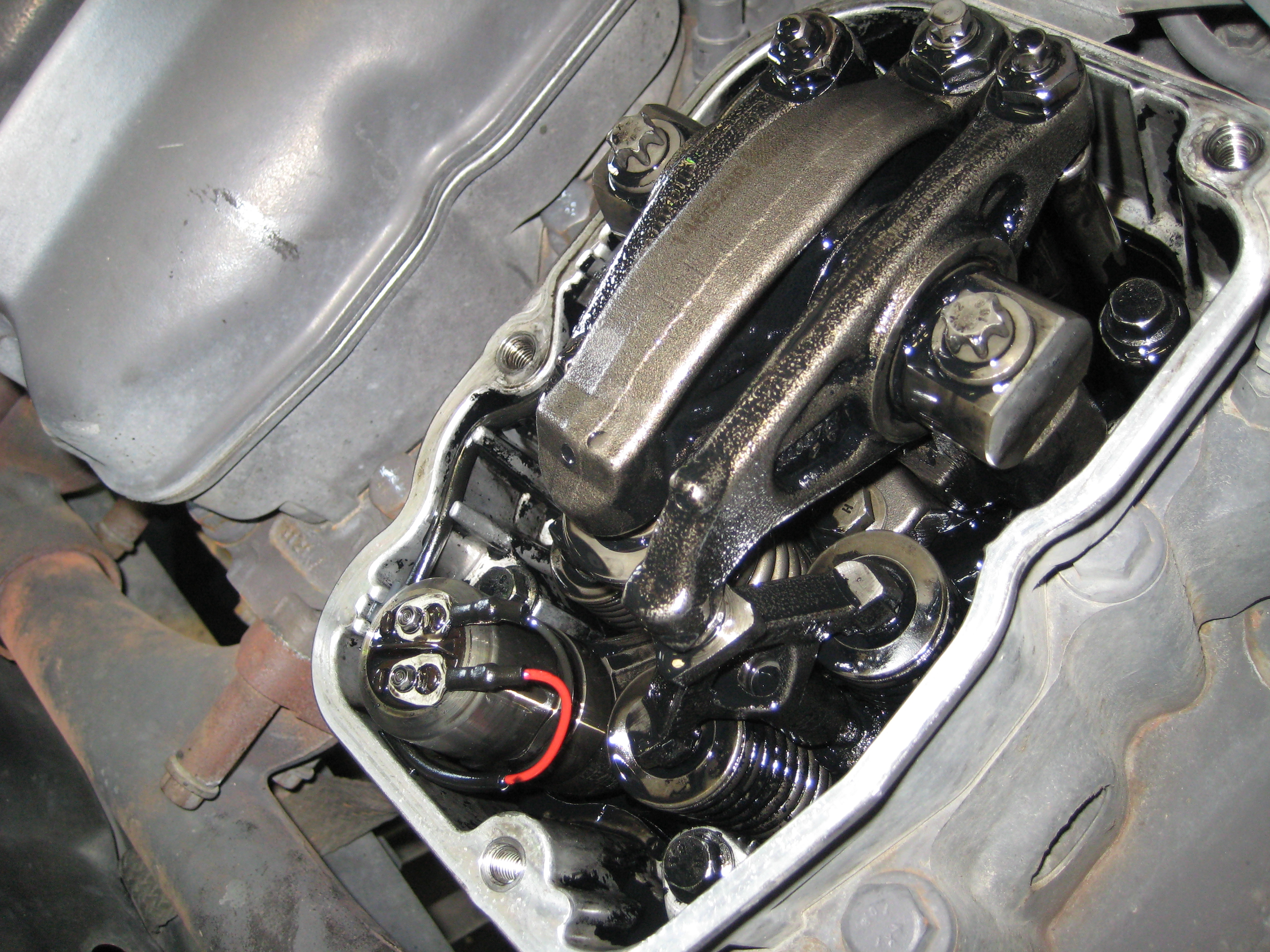
Bosch UI on a Scania R164 V8 engine

The Volkswagen Group mainstream marques used unit injector systems (branded "Pumpe Düse", commonly abbreviated to "PD") in their Suction Diesel Injection (SDI) and Turbocharged Direct Injection (TDI) diesel engines, however this fuel injection method has been superseded by a common-rail design, such as the new 1.6 TDI.

In North America, the Volkswagen Jetta, Golf, and New Beetle TDI 2004–2006 are Pumpe Düse (available in both the MK4 and MK5 generations, with BEW and BRM engine codes respectively, older models use timing belt-driven injection pump).

TDI engines incorporating PD unit injector systems manufactured by the Volkswagen Group were also installed on some cars sold in Europe and other markets where the diesel fuel was conveniently priced, amongst those there were some Chrysler/Dodge cars of the DaimlerChrysler era, e.g. the Dodge Caliber (MY07 BKD, MY08 BMR), Dodge Journey, Jeep Compass, Jeep Patriot.

Volkswagen Group major-interest truck and diesel engine maker Scania AB also uses the unit injector system, which they call "Pumpe-Düse-Einspritzung", or "PDE".

== Hydraulically actuated electronic (HEUI) development and applications ==
In 1993, CAT and International Truck & Engine Corporation introduced "hydraulically actuated electronic unit injection” (HEUI), where the injectors are no longer camshaft-operated and could pressurise fuel independently of engine RPM. First available on Navistar's 7.3 L /444 cuin, V8 diesel engine. HEUI uses engine oil pressure to power high-pressure fuel injection, where the usual method of unit injector operation is with the engine camshaft.

HEUI applications included the Ford 7.3 L and 6.0 L Power Stroke used between May 1993 and 2007. International also used the HEUI system for multiple engines including the DT 466E, DT 570, T-444E, DT-466–570, MaxxForce 5, 7, 9, 10, MaxxForce DT and VT365 engines. Caterpillar incorporated HEUI systems in the 3116, 3126, C7, C9 among others and the Daimler-Detroit Diesel Series 40 engine supplied by International also incorporated a HEUI fuel system. Isuzu fitted a HEUI system to their 3.0 LTR 4JX1 engine fitted to the Trooper and its variants. The HEUI system has been replaced by many manufacturers with common rail injection solutions, a newer technology, to meet better fuel economy and new emissions standards being introduced.

== See also ==
- Anti-dribble valve
- Unit pump
