= Water in fuel sensor =

A water in fuel sensor, or WiF sensor, is an electronic sensor used to indicate the presence of water in fuel. It is installed in a fuel filter. When the water level in the water separator reaches the warning level, the WiF sends an electrical signal to the ECU or to dashboard (lamp). The WiF is often used in common rail engines to avoid fuel injector damage.

The WiF sensor uses the difference of electric conductivity of water compared to diesel and gasoline to determine the presence of water. The WiF sensor can consist of two electrodes that read the level of resistance in the fluid or between the ground and the electrode.

First generation WiF sensors use a potting resin to isolate the electronic circuit, while the latest generation of WiF sensors (the WS3 sensor in surface-mount technology) are made totally without leakage using an innovative co-molding process. The latest generation of WiF sensors have a high resistance to vibrations and to thermal excursion cycles.
