= Unit pump =

Modular high-pressure diesel injection system used in commercial vehicle diesel engines

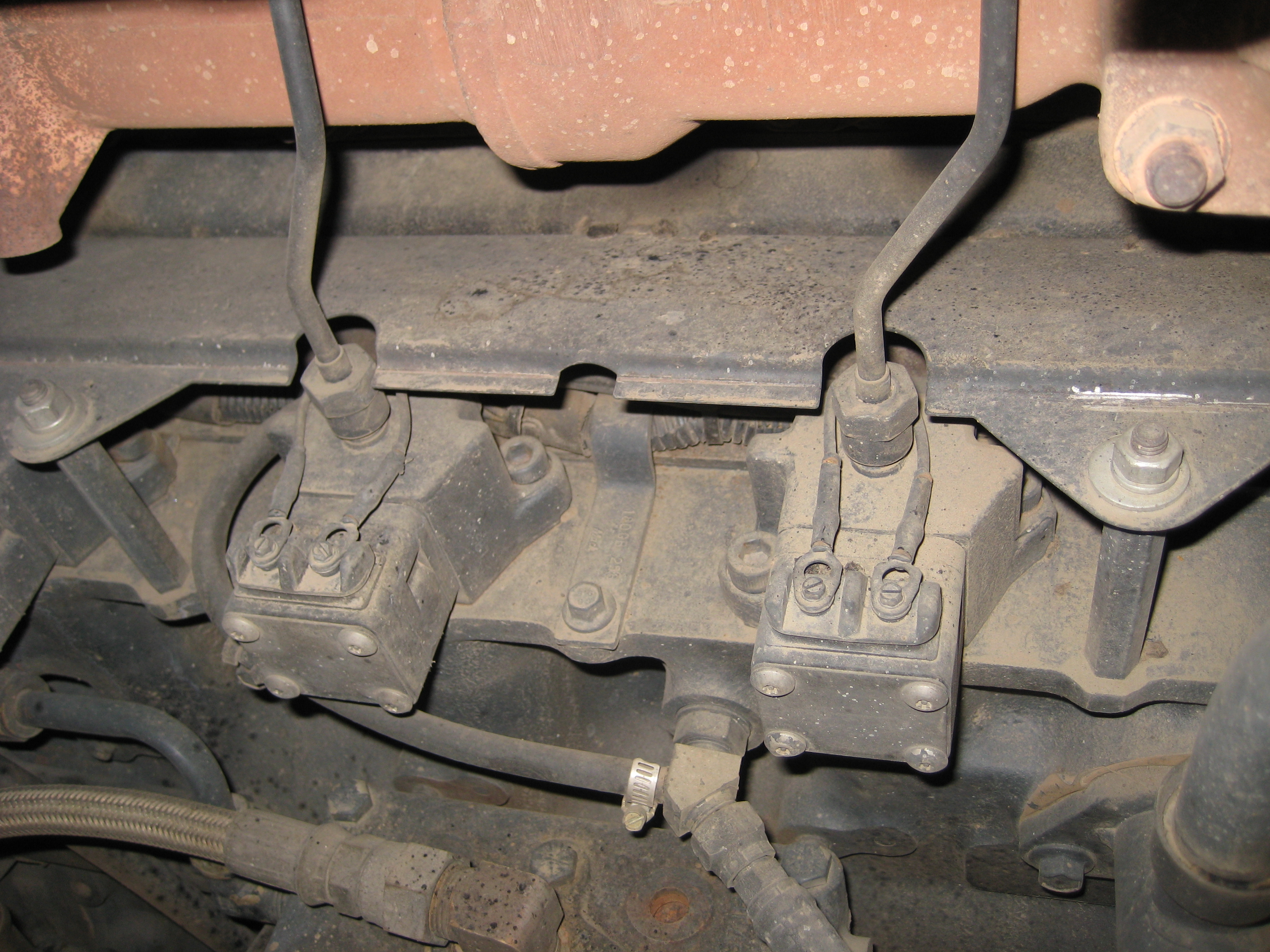
Unit pumps on Mack's E7 diesel engine

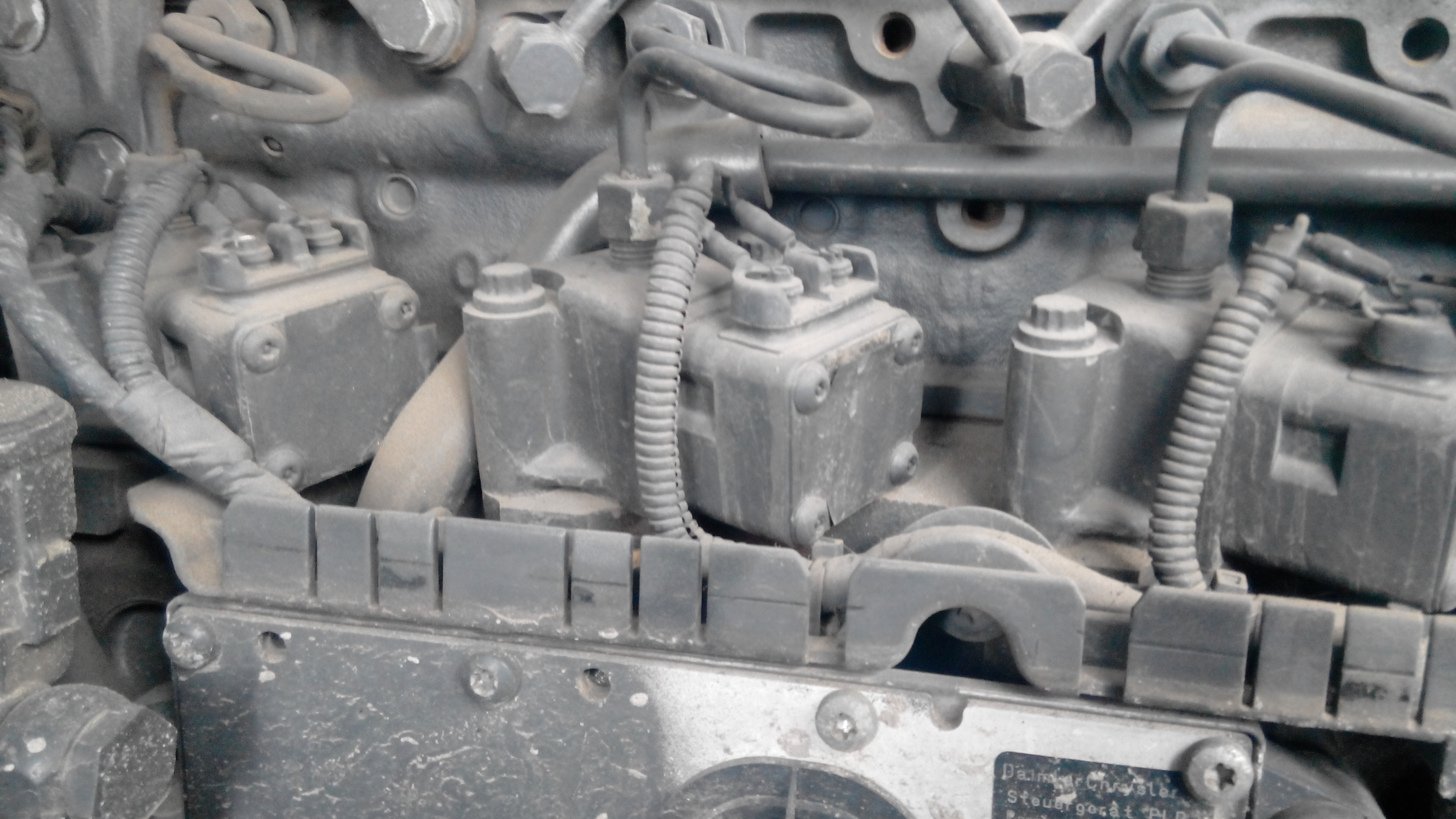
Unit pumps on Mercedes OM906LA engine

The Unit Pump system is a modular high-pressure diesel injection system, which is closely related to the unit Injector system, and is designed for use in commercial vehicle diesel engines.

The systems use an individual injection pump mounted on the engine block for each cylinder so it is primarily designed for OHV or "cam in the block" engines. The fuel pumps can be either driven by an extra camshaft lobe or by an electrical supply where each pump unit is connected to the injector via a short precise length high-pressure fuel line as opposed to unit Injector systems which combines both a pump and an injector element in a compact unit.

Both systems feature electronically controlled fuel solenoids for precise timing and the injection of fuel quantity is variably adjusted for each cylinder.

== Applications ==
Known commercial vehicle manufacturers using the system are Mack (discontinued), Liebherr, Mercedes-Benz, its subsidiaries Freightliner, BharatBenz and Western Star, by Detroit Diesel made MBE 4000 engine.

== See also ==
- Unit Injector
