= Grease fitting =

Metal fitting used in mechanical systems to feed lubricants

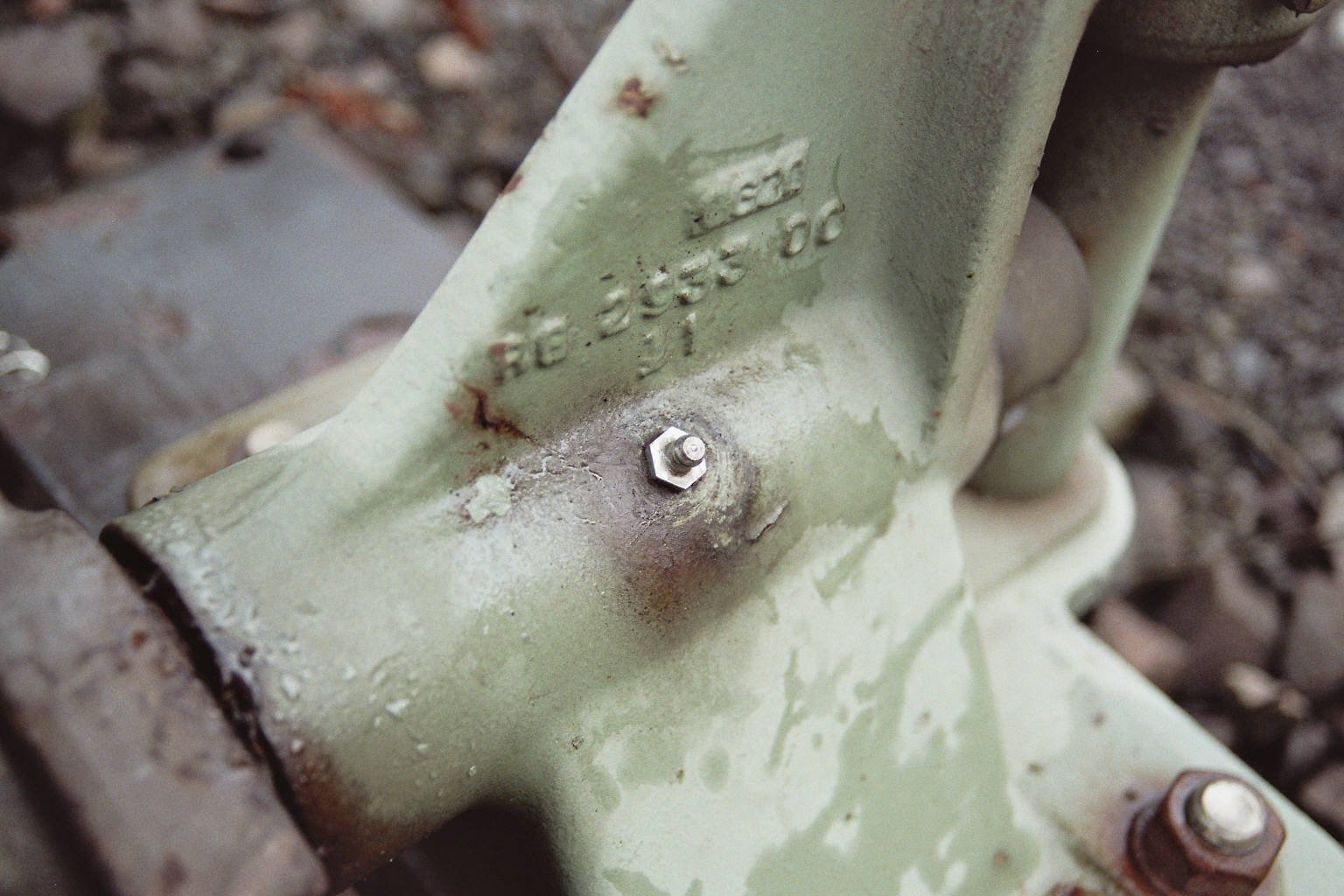
Grease fitting on a bearing

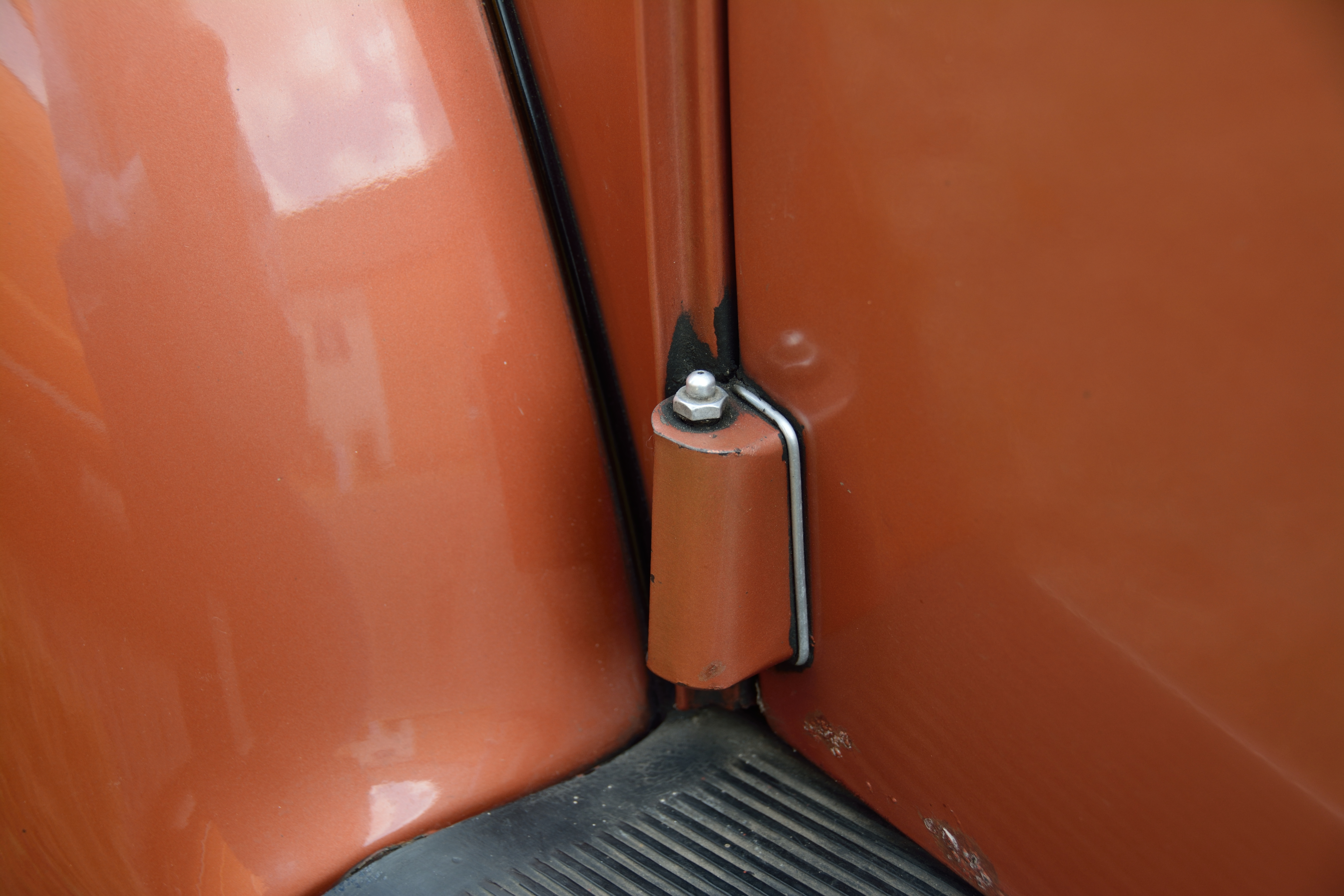
A grease nipple on the driver's door of a 1956 VW Beetle

A grease fitting, grease nipple, Zerk fitting, grease zerk, Alemite fitting, or divit is a metal fitting used in mechanical systems to feed lubricants, usually lubricating grease, into a bearing under moderate to high pressure using a grease gun.

== Design ==
Grease fittings are permanently installed by either a (taper) thread or straight push-fit ('hammer in') arrangement, leaving a nipple connection that a grease gun attaches to. The pressure supplied by the grease gun forces a small captive bearing ball in the fitting to move back against the force of its retaining spring. The arrangement is thus essentially a valve that opens under pressure to allow lubricant to pass through a channel and be forced into the voids of the bearing. When the pressure ceases, the ball returns to its closed position. The ball excludes dirt and functions as a check valve to prevent grease escaping back out of the fitting. The ball is almost flush with the surface of the fitting so that it can be wiped clean to reduce the amount of debris carried with the grease into the bearing.

The common convex shape of the fitting allows the simple concave tip of the grease gun to seal against the fitting easily from many angles, yet with a sufficiently tight seal to force the pressured grease to move the ball and enter the fitting, rather than simply oozing past this temporary annular (ring-shaped) seal. For higher pressure greasing, the grease gun end latches onto the nipple and sealing is effected as a butt joint. If this type of gun end is not perfectly aligned with the nipple, they leak. Once greasing is completed, the latched on nozzle can be released by angling the nozzle over to break the seal with the nipple. Once the seal is broken, the pressure in the nozzle is released thus releasing the latching fingers.

A less common design has a few names including 'button head', 'threepenny bit', 'flat' and 'tat head'. These are a larger nipple head with a flat sealing surface which overhangs the body of the nipple allowing the grease gun end to be hooked onto the nipple with a sliding action which wipes the nipple surface as it's attached. The grease gun hose is usually at a sharp angle (e.g. 70-90°) to the axis of the nipple but can be approached from any azimuthal angle. It is not possible for grease pressure to force this type of connector away from the nipple.

Grease fittings are commonly made from zinc-plated steel, stainless steel, or brass.

== History ==
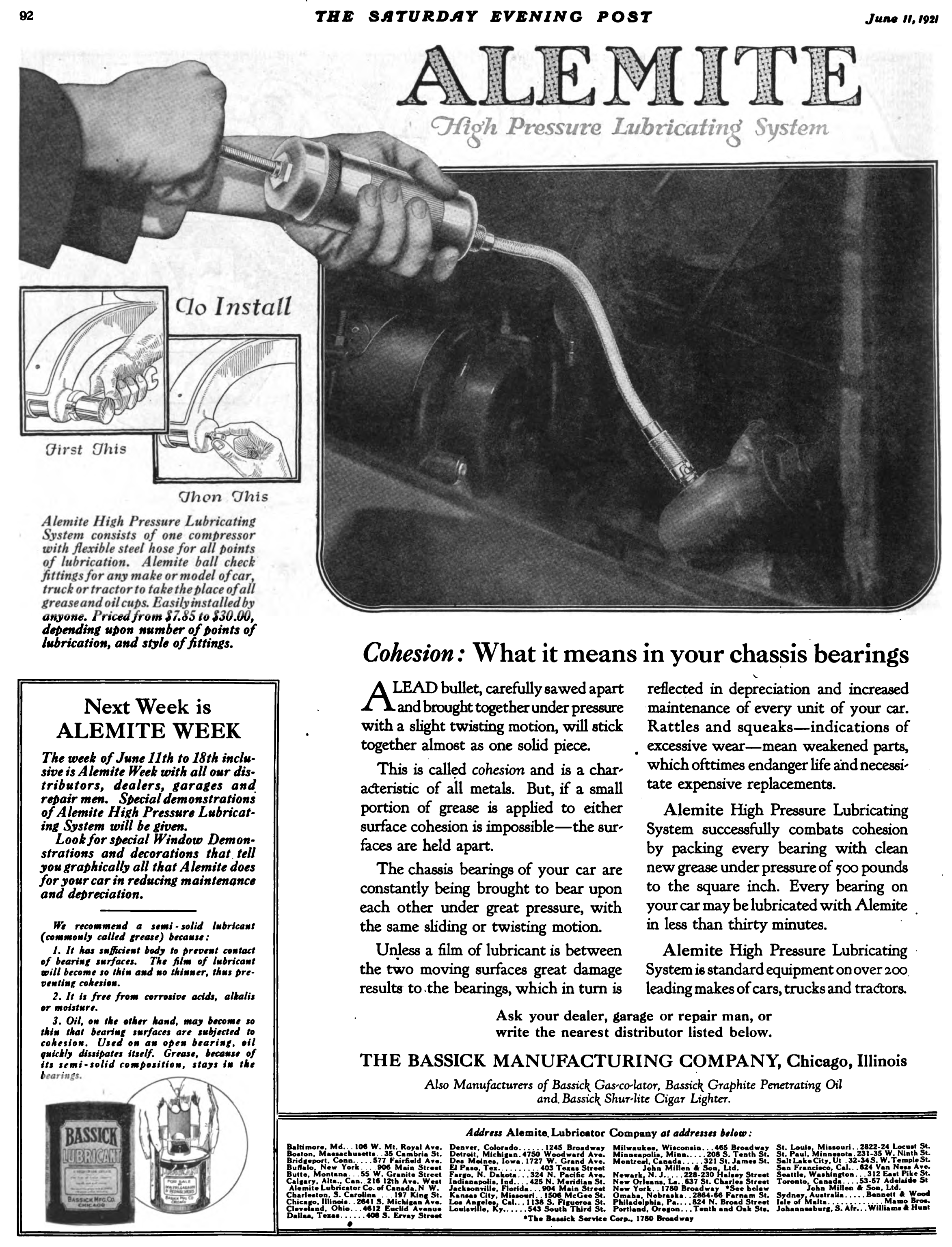
Alemite Lubricator Company advertisement in the Saturday Evening Post, 1921. At the time of this advertisement, the fittings were of the flat-top type, but Zerk fittings would soon appear.

The patent for the Zerk fitting was granted to Oscar U. Zerk in January 1929, and the assignee was the Alemite Manufacturing Corporation. Alemite had already been marketing, since 1919, ball check valves to accept grease supplied under pressure from a grease gun, such as for car and truck chassis lubrication points, both for OEM installations and for aftermarket upgrade kits which would screw in as replacements for stock grease cups, but Zerk's fitting was an improved style, less vulnerable to dirt and more forgiving of angled approach. Today, many companies make these grease fittings.

Before Zerk fittings existed, bearings were lubricated in various other ways that tended to be more maintenance-intensive and often provided less effective lubrication. For example, a typical machinery bearing of the 19th and early 20th centuries was a plain bearing with a cross-drilled hole to receive oil or grease, with no clever fitting at its mouth, or at best a cap or cup. Often lubricant was delivered under no more pressure than gravity or a finger push might provide. For example, oil was gravity-fed into the hole, or grease was pushed in. Grease guns to feed the grease with higher pressure existed, but their pre-Zerk fittings were not as good for making clean, sealed contact easily, and they were less widely used than today.

The oil hole or grease hole was usually covered with a cap of some kind to keep dirt out, from a simple plug or screw to a spring-loaded hinged cap. Sometimes a cup was mounted, acting as a small reservoir, which would weep oil slowly or could be turned at regular intervals to inject grease into the fitting. The standard mode of maintenance was to have each machine's operator, or a dedicated oiler, go around adding a small squirt of oil or blob of grease to each and every hole or cup on a frequent basis.

Typical frequencies for oiling were one oil squirt (to every bearing) for each day of use, or in some cases each week. Grease is essentially oil held in a viscous gel or cream whose viscosity is used to hold the oil over time in places where oil alone cannot be supplied constantly enough, and would quickly drip away without the viscous suspension. This trait makes it better for bearings that cannot practically receive new oil on a near-constant basis. Thus a typical frequency for greasing might be monthly, yearly, or every several years.

If the lubrication schedule was faithfully and conscientiously adhered to, the lubrication quality could be very good. Large marine engines and stationary engines to power whole factories were likeliest to get such top-quality care. But locomotives, rail cars, agricultural implements, and automobiles were less certain of good care, and lubrication quality without constant lubing tended to be intermittent, from mediocre to bad. Attempts to improve on the simple oil hole concept included putting a small reservoir of oil above the hole, which slowly dripped oil into it. An example is the Lunkenheimer oiler in the nearby image. Such oilers often incorporated one or more of the following features:

- A wick (to hold the oil and allow it to be drawn down slowly by capillary action, just as an oil-lamp wick or candle wick fed oil or melted wax to its flame
- A fine mesh screen to act as a filter to keep dirt from getting down the hole
- A glass cup rather than a metal one, which allowed an operator or oiler to see at a glance how low the oil level was

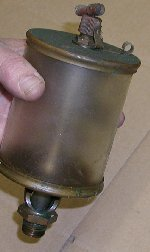
A typical engine oiler. This is one made by Lunkenheimer

For greased bearings, the low pressures of lubrication before the grease fitting could often result in a failure of the grease to travel all the way down into all the voids of the bearing. The grease fitting improved this penetration, yielding more effective lubrication.

== Use ==
Since the 1920s, the ever-growing proliferation of sealed bearings throughout the manufacturing industries has made the use of grease fittings less common. Sealed bearings are lubricated for life at the factory, and are sealed such that the lubricant is not lost or dirtied. Grease fittings are far from obsolete, however, and much new machinery is built with them every year (e.g., tractors, lawnmowers, industrial plant equipment, and still a few car and truck parts). As long as maintenance is even minimally attended to (via occasional lube jobs where new grease is pumped into the bearing), this type of bearing and lubrication setup is cost-effective, simple, and long-lasting.

Norton Commando motorcycles (1967–1975) had a 'grease' nipple fitted to the swing arm assembly but heavy gear box oil was stipulated by the factory. The subsequent confusion by owners (who assumed that the presence of an Alemite/Zerk-type fitting implied that grease was intended) often resulted in grease being used (causing rapid wear of the pivot bushes). The same error was made on some models of machine tools with Alemite/Zerk-type fittings for their way oil.
