= Frederick Lamplough =

British engineer

Frederick William Lamplough (born Cannon; bapt. 11 October 1863 – 3 December 1926) was a British engineer who invented the diesel injector (Unit Injector).

== Career ==
He formed the company Lamplough & Son Ltd in 1899. It was based in north-west London.

The company made aeroplanes and internal combustion aviation turbines. The aircraft it built were very primitive, similar to craft seen in Those Magnificent Men in their Flying Machines, and not of the conventional shape seen today. The company also made aircraft rotary engines.

=== Diesel injection ===
The British patent No. 1517 was issued to him in 1911 for a diesel injection system.
