= Anti-dribble valve =

An anti-dribble valve is a component of a fuel injection system used for diesel engines. Its main function is to provide precise timing of fuel injection, particularly at the end of the injection time. If fuel was allowed to 'dribble' after the main phase of injection, this fuel would be too late for good combustion and so would be only partially burned as visible exhaust soot.

Although simple, the valve has several functions:

- A one-way check valve
- A 'pop' valve
- An anti-dribble valve

The valve was introduced on injection equipment by the firm of CAV Bosch in the 1930s.

== Check valve ==
A check valve allows flow in only one direction and prevents back-flow. This maintains the injector pipe as full of fuel, as any leakage here would require the pipes to be primed again before the engine could be restarted.

== Pop valve ==
A pop valve, like the later forms of steam locomotive safety valve, only flows once a certain pressure has been reached. It then opens sharply, allowing full flow. This is used to make a sharp, abrupt start to fuel injection. This ensures that no fuel leaks into the cylinder until full combustion is imminent.

In practice, the pop function of this valve is unimportant, as the fuel injector itself contains a similar valve. Control of the opening of the injector and the first fuel delivery is important, but this is best handled at the injector end of the pipe, thus avoided time delays as fuel propagates through the delivery pipe.

== Anti-dribble valve ==
The anti dribble function or 'pressure pipe release' is achieved by not only stopping fuel flow after the main delivery phase, but also by lowering the pressure in the pipe at this point. Together with the pop valve in the fuel injector, this ensures that fuel flow stops abruptly when it needs to. This is the most important aspect of the valve, as the only device that provides this function.

== Operation ==
The valve resembles a typical spring-loaded check valve, with a small addition for the anti-dribble function. These valves are mounted on the outlet fittings of the fuel injection pump, one per cylinder injector. They are always mounted at the pump end of the pipes between the pump and injectors.

The check valve aspect is a conical valve or 'mitre valve', (Note: A 'mitre valve' is a form of disc valve with a conical face, against a conical valve seat. Axial spring pressure holds the two faces together. As the seats are conical, they have some degree of self-centring action against spring pressure and so provide a tight seal.) held against a matching conical seat by a spring. As these valves must work at high pressure, the valve faces are accurately ground to shape. The valve is also held accurately concentric to its seat by a fluted extension, usually cross-shaped or three-winged, below the seat. This extension is merely a guide and does not act as a valve.

Anti-dribble action is provided by a second valve seat, below the conical main seat (i.e. on the pump side). This is a cylindrical valve, fitting a cylindrical seat. This valve seat closes first, before the mitre valve, and shuts off the fuel flow. As the seat is cylindrical though, the spring pressure does not hold the seat surfaces together to make a tight seal, and so the mitre valve is still needed.

Once the cylindrical valve has closed, the spring presses it still further down through the seat. There is a small distance between the point where the cylindrical valve first closes, and where the mitre valve finally closes. This has the effect of slightly increasing the volume of the closed-off volume, including the delivery pipe. As liquids are near-incompressible, (Note: For a compressible gas, the pressure and volume are inversely proportional, by Boyle's law. Liquids have a much higher modulus of elasticity, sufficient to be generally considered to be 'incompressible', although they do in fact have some elasticity and so their pressure and volume are interrelated.) even this tiny change in volume has the effect of dropping the pressure in the pipe. This drop in pressure allows the injector valve to close fully, without leakage or dribble.

This drop in pressure upon valve closure also helps to avoid the effects of water hammer within the delivery pipe. This can, if uncontrolled, cause the injector valve to bounce upon its seat and encourage dribble, or even to cause work hardening and eventual fracture to the pipework.
