= Injection pump =

Component of a diesel engine

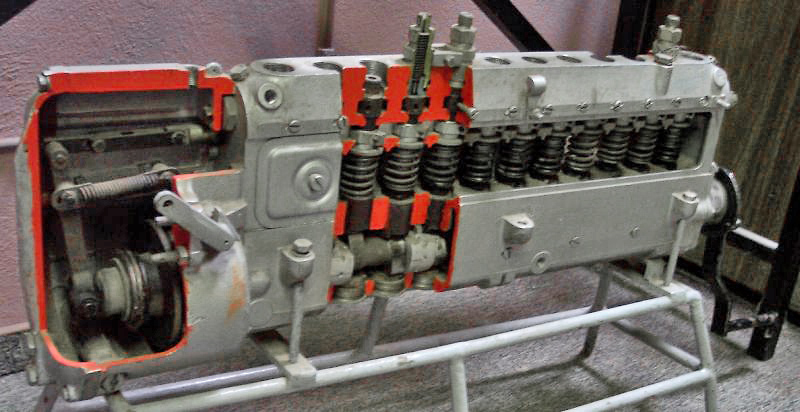
Injection pump for a 12-cylinder diesel engine

An injection pump is the device that pumps fuel into the cylinders of a diesel engine. Traditionally, the injection pump was driven indirectly from the crankshaft by gears, chains or a toothed belt (often the timing belt) that also drives the camshaft. It rotates at half crankshaft speed in a conventional four-stroke diesel engine. Its timing is such that the fuel is injected only very slightly before top dead centre of that cylinder's compression stroke. It is also common for the pump belt to be driven directly from the camshaft. In some systems injection pressures can be as high as 620 bar (8992 psi).

== Safety ==
Because of the need for positive injection into a very high-pressure environment, the pump develops great pressure—typically 15,000 psi (100 MPa) or more on newer systems. This is a good reason to take great care when working on diesel systems; escaping fuel at this sort of pressure can easily penetrate skin and clothes, and be injected into body tissues with medical consequences serious enough to warrant amputation.

== Construction ==
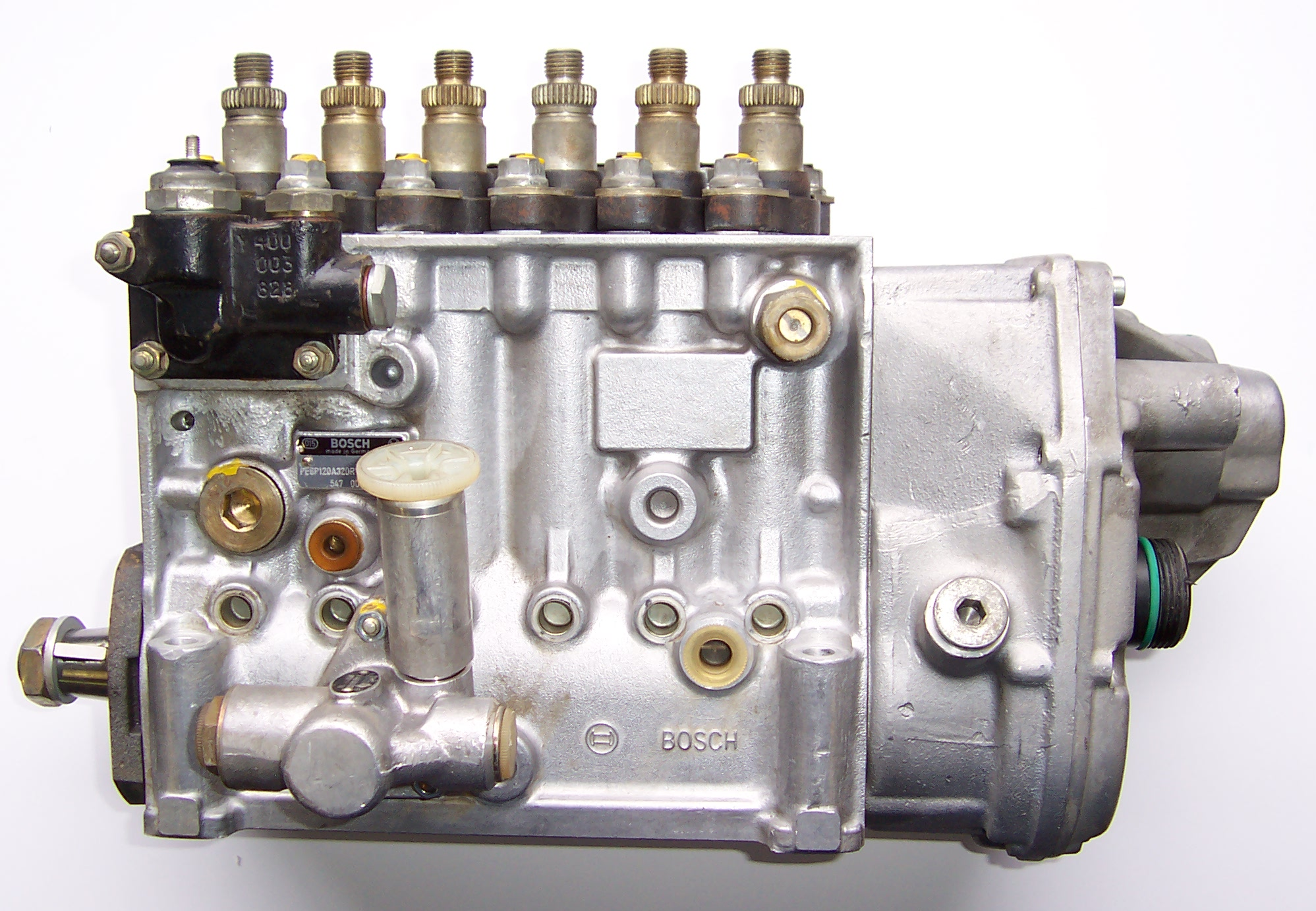
Inline diesel injection pump

Earlier diesel pumps used an in-line layout with a series of cam-operated injection cylinders in a line, rather like a miniature inline engine. The pistons have a constant stroke volume, and injection volume (i.e., throttling) is controlled by rotating the cylinders against a cut-off port that aligns with a helical slot in the cylinder. When all the cylinders are rotated at once, they simultaneously vary their injection volume to produce more or less power from the engine. Inline pumps still find favour on large multi-cylinder engines such as those on trucks, construction plant, static engines and agricultural vehicles.

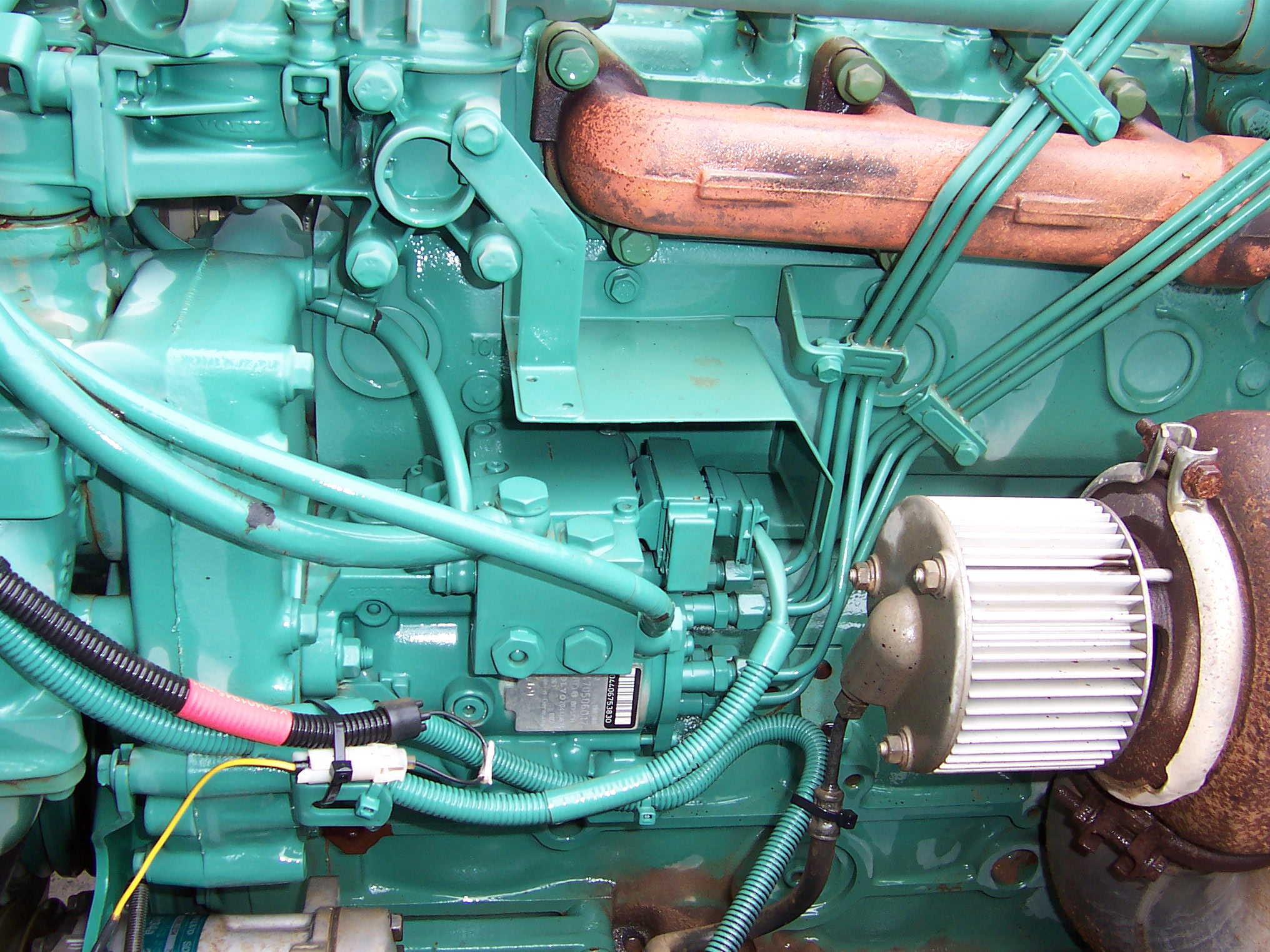
Distributor diesel injection pump

For use on cars and light trucks, the rotary pump or distributor pump was developed. It uses a single injection cylinder driven from an axial cam plate, which injects into the individual fuel lines via a rotary distribution valve. Later incarnations, such as the Bosch VE pump, vary the injection timing with crankshaft speed to allow greater power at high crank speeds, and smoother, more economical running at slower revolution of crankshaft. Some distributor injection pumps (or VE for Verteilereinspritz in German) variants have a pressure-based system that allows the injection volume to increase over normal to allow a turbocharger or supercharger equipped engine to develop more power under boost conditions.

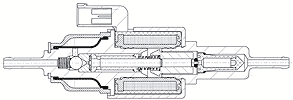
Inline diesel metering pump

All injection pumps incorporate a governor to cut fuel supply if the crankshaft rpm endangers the engine - the heavy moving parts of diesel engines do not tolerate overspeeding well, and catastrophic damage can occur if they are over-revved. Poorly maintained and worn engines can consume their lubrication oil through worn out crankcase ventilation systems and 'run away', causing increasing engine speed until the engine destroys itself. This is because most diesel engines only regulate their speed by fuel supply control and most don't have a throttle valve to control air intake, other than those with EGR systems.

== New types ==
Mechanical pumps are gradually being phased out in order to comply with international emissions directives, and to increase performance and economy. From the 1990s an intermediate stage between full electronic control were pumps that used electronic control units to control some of the functions of the rotary pump but were still mechanically timed and powered by the engine. The first generation four and five cylinder VW/Audi TDI engines pioneered these pumps before switching to unit injectors. These pumps were used to provide better injection control and refinement for car diesel engines as they changed from indirect injection to much more efficient but inherently less refined direct injection engines in the 1990s. The ECUs could even vary the damping of hydraulic engine mounts to aid refinement. BOSCH VP30 VP37 VP44 are example pumps. Since then there has been a widespread change to common rail diesel systems and electronic unit direct injection systems. These allow higher pressures to be developed, much finer control of injection volumes, and multiple injection stages compared to mechanical systems.

== See also ==
- Unit injector

Injection pressures during the whole process should be above 1000–1200 bar for a good spray formation and air–fuel mixture; a tendency in practice to 1600–1800 bar and higher is noted.
