= Tata Xover =

Crossover SUV concept car

Overview
- Manufacturer: Tata Motors
- Assembly: Pune, Maharashtra, India

Body and chassis
- Class: Compact crossover SUV/concept car
- Body style: 5-door SUV
- Related: Tata Aria

Powertrain
- Engine: 2.2 L vtt DiCOR diesel I4
- Transmission: 5-speed manual

Dimensions
- Wheelbase: 2,650 mm (104.3 in)
- Length: 4,850 mm (190.9 in)

The Tata Xover (pronounced "crossover") is a 7-seat crossover SUV concept car created by the Indian automaker Tata Motors. It was first introduced in 2005 at the 75th Geneva Motor Show.

The Xover is 4.85 metres (190.9 in) long and designed to accept Tata's next generation Euro IV compliant powertrains. The company also stated that the car would be available in both diesel and petrol and can also be fitted with a Euro III engine.

== History ==
The concept car was first shown at the 75th Geneva Motor Show in 2005. The car's design was done by London-based Tata Motors European Technical Centre (TMETC) and the car's exterior styling was done by I.DE.A. The company had stated that "the styling and the engineering of the car has been done specifically for the European market". The car was compared to Toyota Innova at the launch.

A few years later, decision was taken to go ahead with the production. The design was fine-tuned and vendors for supply of components were contacted. The design was changed though the car was still expected to resemble the older version. It was reported that, in 2009, testing of the prototypes was underway.

In January 2010, Xover was launched as the Tata Aria at the Indian Auto Expo in New Delhi. The vehicle's price was expected to be Rs 6-8 lakh. Aria had some minor changes as the grill, headlamps and minor cosmetics were changed.

== See also ==
- Tata Elegante
- Tata Prima
