= Graco Inc. =

American fluid-handling manufacturer

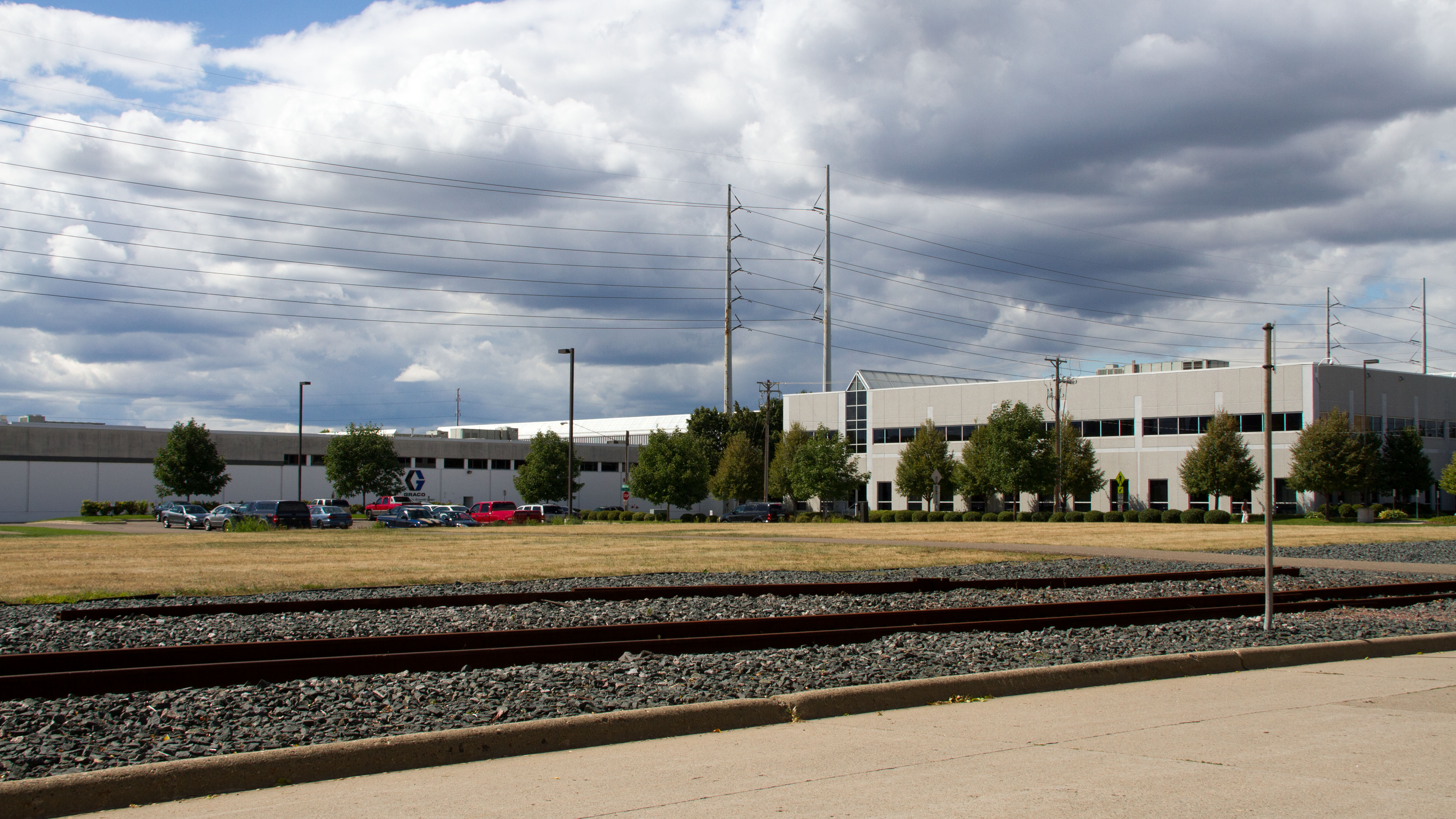
- Headquarters in Minneapolis
- Company type: Public
- Traded as: NYSE: GGG; S&P 400 component
- Industry: Manufacturing
- Founded: 1926; 100 years ago
- Founder: Russell Gray; Leil Gray
- Headquarters: Minneapolis, Minnesota, United States
- Area served: Worldwide
- Key people: Mark W. Sheahan (President and CEO); Kevin Gilligan (Chairman)
- Products: Fluid and Powder Handling Equipment
- Revenue: ▼US$2.11 billion (2024)
- Operating income: ▼US$570 million (2024)
- Net income: ▼US$486 million (2024)
- Total assets: ▲US$3.14 billion (2024)
- Total equity: ▲US$2.58 billion (2024)
- Number of employees: 4,300 (2024)
- Divisions: Contractor, Industrial, Process
- Website: graco.com

Graco Inc. is an American manufacturer of fluid-handling systems and equipment, headquartered in Minneapolis, Minnesota. Founded in 1926 as the Gray Company, it adopted its present name in 1969 and is listed on the New York Stock Exchange (NYSE: GGG) as a component of the S&P 400. Its products, sold worldwide, include spray-finishing, pumping, dispensing, and lubrication equipment for industrial, contractor, and process applications.

== History ==
Russell Gray, a Minneapolis parking lot attendant, founded Gray Company, Inc. in 1926 with his brother Leil Gray to produce and sell Russell's air-powered grease gun, invented in response to cold weather making hand-powered grease guns inoperable. In its first year of operation, sales were $35,000.

By 1941, annual sales had reached $1 million. During World War II it supplied lubricating equipment for defense use. After the war, Graco moved beyond lubricant handling, developing a paint pump and pumps that drew industrial fluids directly from the drum.

By the mid-1950s, sales had reached $5 million and the company employed 400 people.

Leil Gray died in 1958, and was succeeded as president by Harry A. Murphy. He was succeeded in turn by David A. Koch in 1962. The company continued to expand, helped by the 1957 introduction of the airless spray gun. By 1969, when Gray Company went public and changed its name to Graco, it had annual sales of $33 million.

After acquiring H. G. Fischer & Co., a manufacturer of electrostatic finishing products, Graco benefited from a shift in automobile painting from air-based to electrostatic technology. By 1979, sales had reached $100 million.

In 1981, Graco started a joint venture called Graco Robotics, Inc. (GRI) with Edon Finishing Systems. George Aristides, a 20-year company veteran, became president and chief operating officer in June 1993.

David Roberts, recruited from the Marmon Group, became president and chief executive officer in 2001. He left in 2007 to lead Carlisle Companies and was succeeded as chief executive by Patrick J. McHale.

Graco agreed in April 2011 to acquire the finishing businesses of Illinois Tool Works for $650 million. In December 2011 the Federal Trade Commission issued an administrative complaint to block the deal, contending it would reduce competition in liquid finishing equipment. The acquisition closed in 2012; Graco subsequently divested the liquid finishing operations, which it sold in 2014, while retaining the Gema powder-coating business. Mark W. Sheahan succeeded Patrick J. McHale as president and chief executive officer in June 2021.

In 2026, Graco broke ground on a new headquarters in Dayton, Minnesota, a northwestern suburb of Minneapolis, and planned to relocate there by mid-2027.

== Acquisitions ==
Graco has grown in part through acquisitions. The following are among its larger transactions.

Selected acquisitions
Year	Target	Business	Value
2005	Gusmer Corporation and Gusmer Europe	Two-component dispensing equipment	$65 million
2012	Finishing businesses of Illinois Tool Works	Paint and powder finishing	$650 million
2024	PCT Systems	Cleaning systems for semiconductors and optics	Undisclosed
2024	Corob S.p.A.	Dispensing and mixing equipment	€230 million
2025	Color Service S.r.l.	Automated dosing and dispensing systems	€63 million
2026	Valco Melton	Adhesive application and quality-assurance systems	$447 million

== Operations ==
Graco classifies its business into three reportable segments: Contractor, Industrial, and Process. It distributes its products worldwide through a network of independent distributors.

The Contractor segment, the largest at about 47 percent of 2024 sales, makes sprayers that apply paint to walls and other structures, with models for users ranging from do-it-yourself homeowners to professional contractors.

The Industrial segment, about 29 percent of 2024 sales, comprises the Industrial and Powder divisions and supplies equipment for moving and applying paints, powder coatings, sealants, adhesives, and other fluids.

The Process segment, about 24 percent of 2024 sales, comprises the Process and Lubrication divisions and makes pumps, valves, meters, and accessories that move and dispense fluids such as chemicals, oil and natural gas, water, wastewater, food, and lubricants.

== Products ==
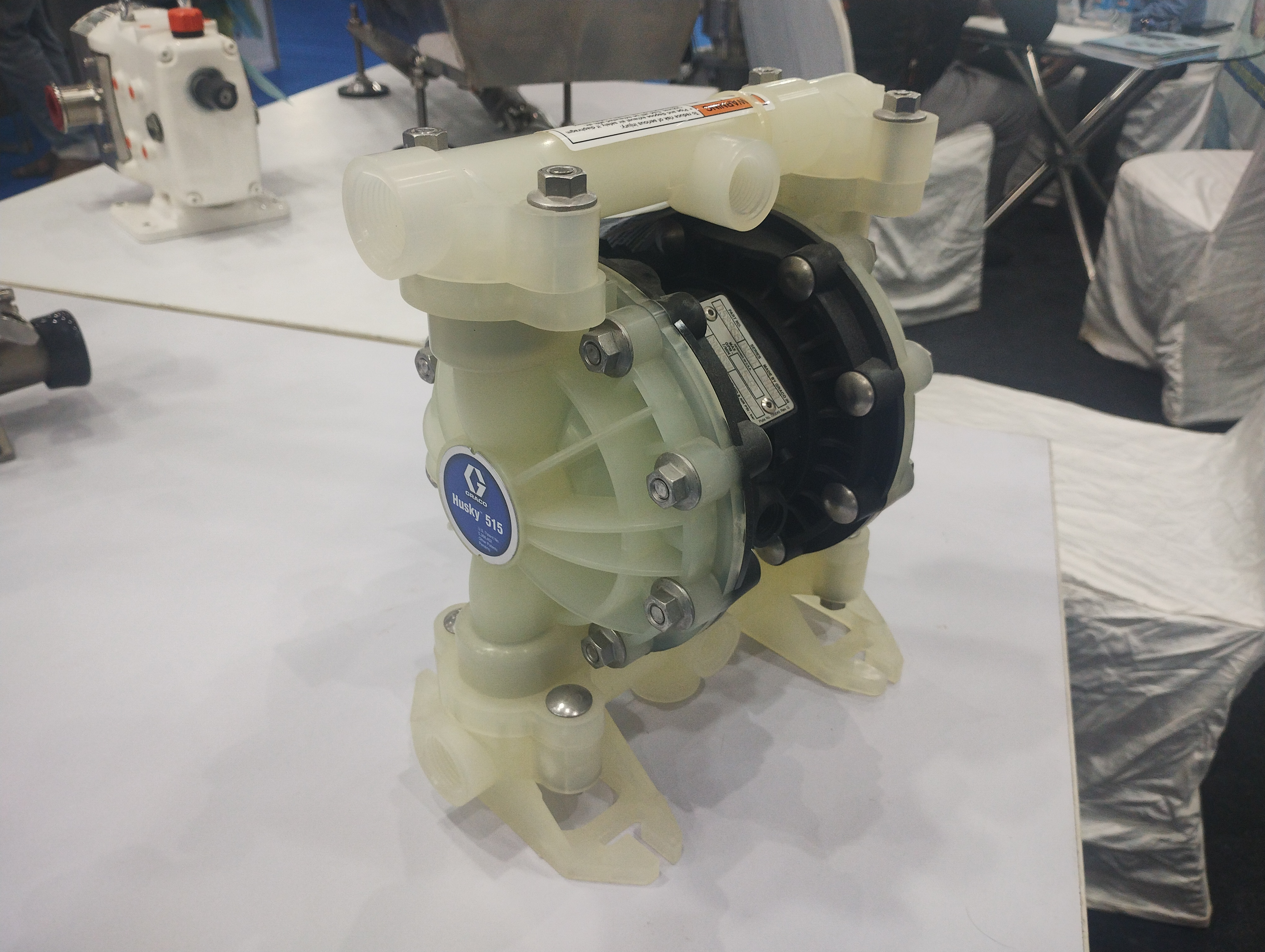
A Graco product: Husky 515 diaphragm pump, at Food Expo 2025, BIEC

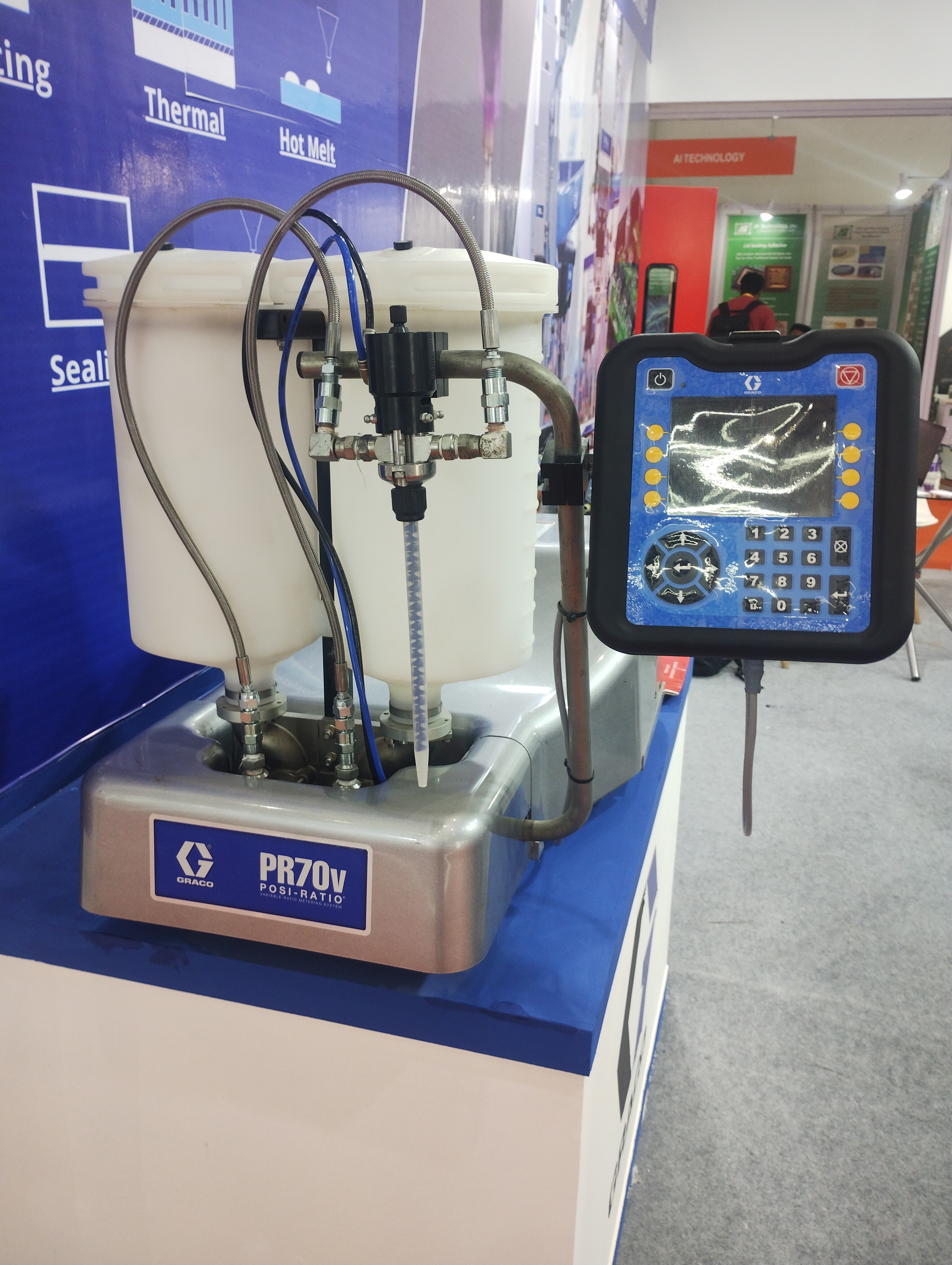
Graco PR70v Variable Ratio Metering System, in Electronica 2025, BIEC

Graco makes equipment for moving, measuring, controlling, dispensing, and spraying fluid and powder materials. Its product lines include airless and air-assisted paint sprayers, line-striping machines, industrial transfer pumps, sealant and adhesive dispensing and metering systems, and automatic lubrication systems.
