= Tata Altroz =

Hatchback from Tata Motors

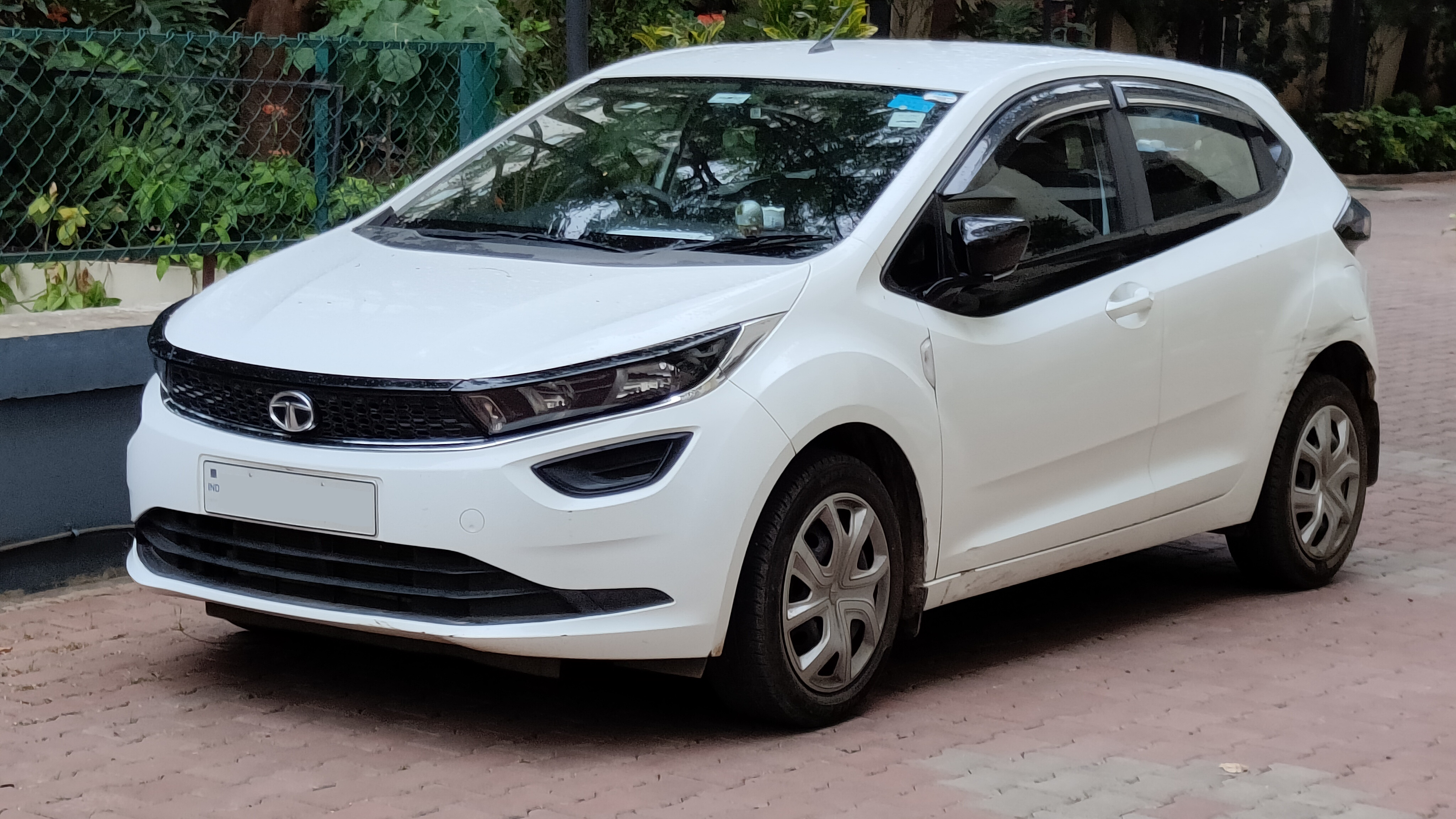
- Tata Altroz XM+ 1.2 Turbo (pre-facelift)

Overview
- Manufacturer: Tata Motors
- Production: January 2020–present
- Assembly: India: Pune, Maharashtra
- Designer: Pratap Bose (pre-facelift); Martin Ulharik (facelift)

Body and chassis
- Class: Supermini (B)
- Body style: 5-door hatchback
- Layout: Front-engine, front-wheel-drive
- Platform: ALFA-ARC platform
- Related: Tata Punch

Powertrain
- Engine: Petrol: 1.2 L Revotron I3; 1.2 L I-Turbo I3 turbo; Petrol/CNG; 1.2 L Revotron I3; Diesel: 1.5 L Revotorq I4 turbo
- Transmission: 5-speed manual; 5-speed AMT; 6-speed DCA

Dimensions
- Wheelbase: 2,501 mm (98.5 in)
- Length: 3,990 mm (157.1 in)
- Width: 1,755 mm (69.1 in)
- Height: 1,523 mm (60.0 in)
- Curb weight: 1,036–1,150 kg (2,284–2,535 lb)

Chronology
- Predecessor: Tata Bolt

The Tata Altroz is a subcompact car/supermini manufactured by Tata Motors. The Altroz was revealed at the 89th Geneva International Motor Show alongside the new Buzzard, Buzzard Sport, and H2X compact SUV concept. It was launched to the Indian market on 22 January 2020. The name "Altroz" was inspired by the name of bird species, Albatross.

At present, the Altroz has three engines on offer, which are 1.2-litre three-cylinder petrol, 1.5-litre turbodiesel and a 1.2-litre three-cylinder turbocharged petrol. There is a 5-speed manual transmission on offer, with an optional wet-clutch DCT automatic known as Altroz DCA.

== 2022 Tata Altroz DCA ==
The 6-speed DCT gearbox is paired with the same 1.2-liter Revotron engine found in the Tata Tigor and Tiago models, producing 86 horsepower (64 kW; 87 PS) at 6,000 rpm and 113 N⋅m (83 lb⋅ft; 12 kg⋅m) of torque at 3,300 rpm.

== 2024 Tata Altroz Racer ==
On 7 June 2024, Tata launched the performance variant called Altroz Racer. It is powered by a 1.2-liter turbocharged petrol engine producing 120 metric horsepower (88 kW; 118 hp) and 170 N⋅m (125 lb⋅ft; 17 kg⋅m) torque. It comes in 3 variants with price starting at INR 9.49 lakh. This model was discontinued on 22nd May 2025 ahead of the launch of the facelift.

== 2025 facelift ==
In May 2025, Tata Motors introduced a facelifted version of the Altroz, incorporating updates to its exterior, interior, and feature set. The model received a redesigned front fascia with twin-pod LED projector headlamps, eyebrow-shaped LED daytime running lights (DRLs), and a slimmer grille with a textured finish. The front bumper was updated with sharper contours, and LED fog lamps were added on higher trims. At the rear, the Altroz features interconnected LED tail lamps.

Inside the cabin, the facelifted Altroz includes a new two-spoke steering wheel with an illuminated Tata logo, a larger 10.25-inch touchscreen infotainment system supporting wireless Android Auto and Apple CarPlay, and a 10.25-inch fully digital instrument cluster with support for map projection and blind-view monitoring. Other additions include an air purifier, wireless phone charging, and Tata's connected car platform, iRA.

The safety package was expanded to include six airbags as standard across all variants. Additional safety features include an electronic stability program (ESP), rear parking sensors, Isofix child seat anchors, and a 360-degree camera available on select variants.

The powertrain lineup remains unchanged, offering a 1.2-litre naturally aspirated petrol engine, a 1.5-litre diesel engine, and a 1.2-litre petrol-CNG dual-fuel option. Transmission choices now include a 5-speed manual, a 6-speed dual-clutch automatic (DCT) for the petrol variant, and a newly introduced 5-speed automated manual transmission (AMT).

== Safety ==
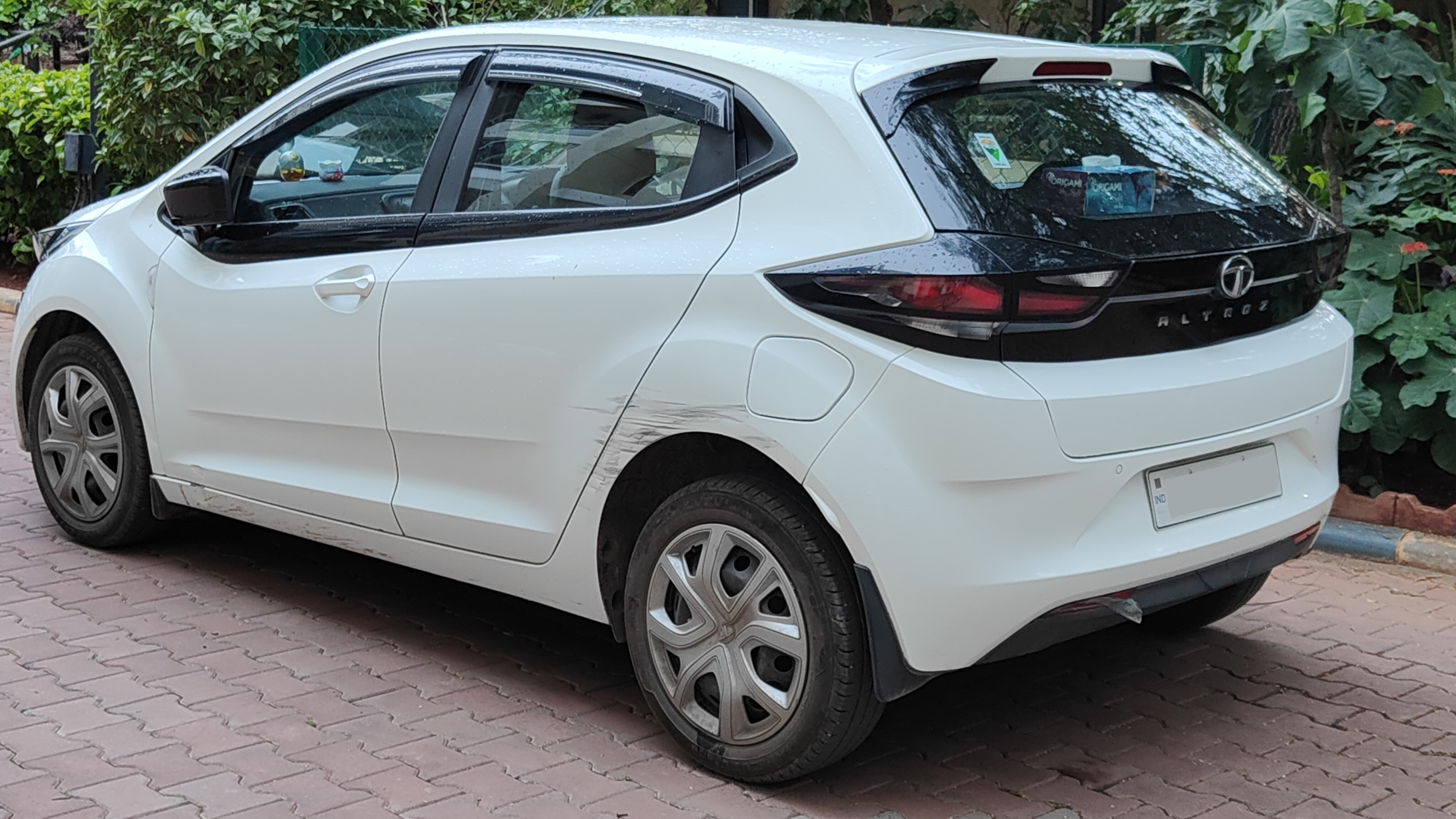
1 gen Altroz Rear view

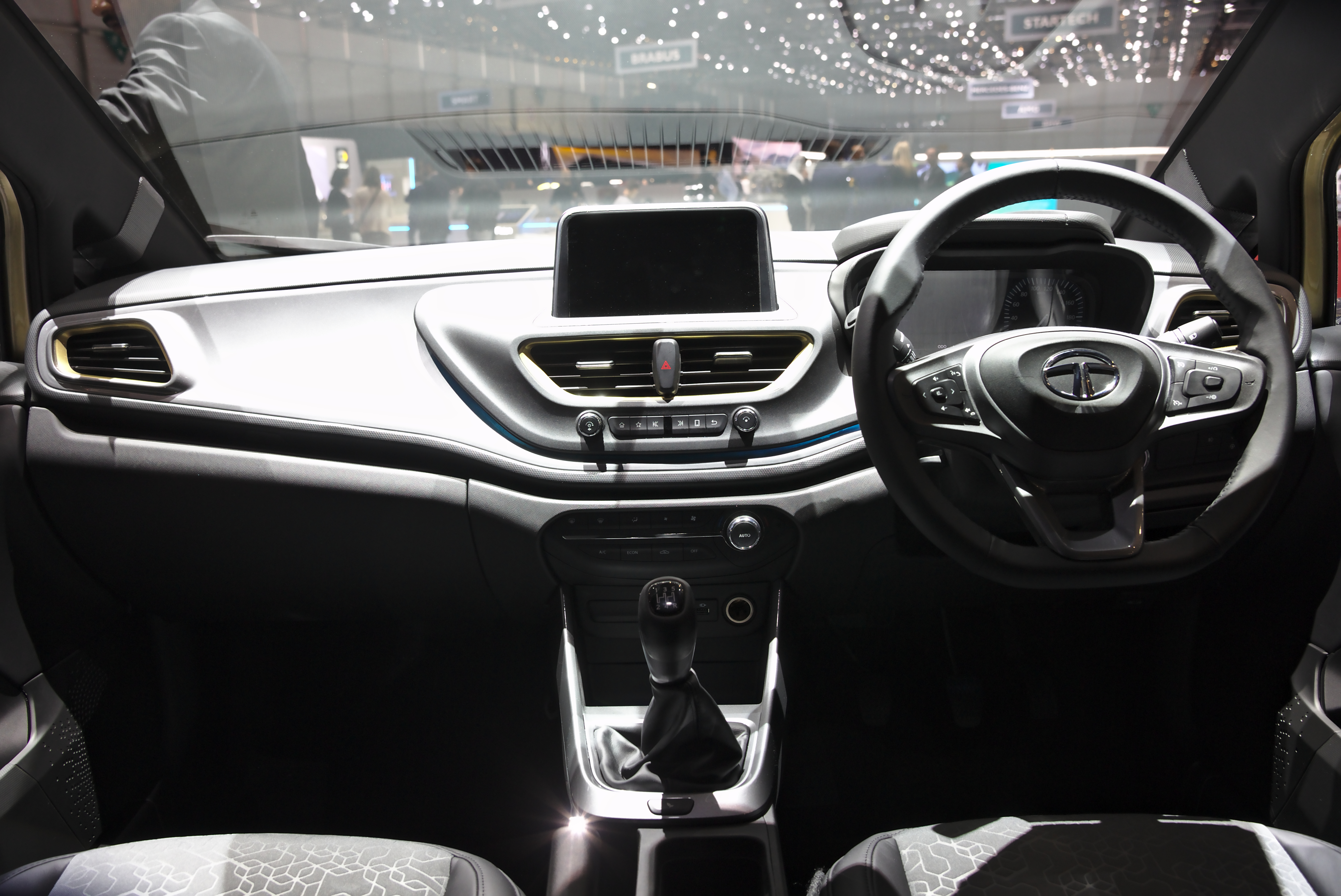
Old Interior

The Tata Altroz was tested by the Global NCAP 1.0 in 2020 (similar to Latin NCAP 2013) in its basic safety specification of two airbags and ISOFIX anchorages as standard. It achieved five stars for adult occupant protection (becoming the second Indian car to do so) and three stars for child occupant protection. Its structure was rated as capable of withstanding further loadings.

Global NCAP 1.0 test results (India) Tata Altroz – 2 Airbags (2020, similar to Latin NCAP 2013)
Test	Score	Stars
Adult occupant protection	16.13/17.00	5 /5 stars
Child occupant protection	29.00/49.00	3 /5 stars

Bharat NCAP test results Tata Altroz (2023, based on Latin NCAP 2016)
Test	Score	Stars
Adult occupant protection	29.65/32.00	5 /5 stars
Child occupant protection	44.90/49.00	5 /5 stars
