= Poonchi =

Poonchi, or Punchhi, may refer to:

- Madan Mohan Punchhi (1933–2015), Chief Justice of India
- Poonchi Pahari, a dialect of Pahari-Pothwari

== See also ==
- Poonch (disambiguation)
- Punch (disambiguation)
- Punshi
