= Tata Zest =

Subcompact sedan produced by Tata Motors (2014–2019)

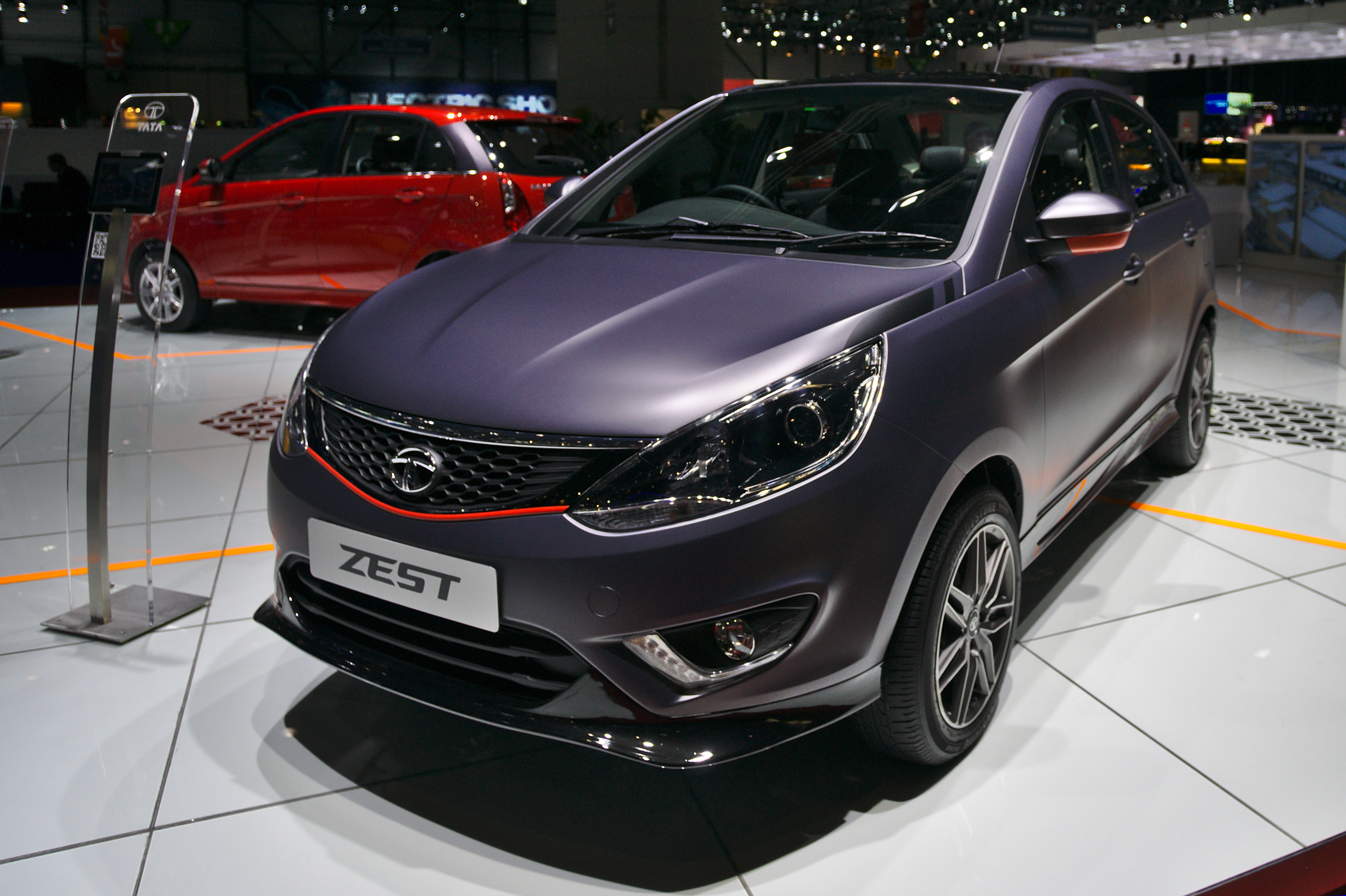

Overview
- Also called: Tata Bolt Sedan (South Africa)
- Production: 2014–2019
- Assembly: India: Ranjangaon, Pune

Body and chassis
- Class: Supermini (B)
- Body style: 4-door sedan
- Layout: front-engine, front-wheel-drive
- Platform: Tata X1
- Related: Tata Bolt

Powertrain
- Engine: 1.2 L Revotron turbo I3 (petrol); 1.3 L Quadrajet I4 (diesel)
- Transmission: 5-speed manual 5-speed automatic

Dimensions
- Wheelbase: 2,470 mm (97.2 in)
- Length: 3,995 mm (157.3 in)
- Width: 1,706 mm (67.2 in)
- Height: 1,570 mm (61.8 in)
- Curb weight: 1,115–1,170 kg (2,458–2,579 lb)

Chronology
- Predecessor: Tata Indigo Manza
- Successor: Tata Tigor

Tata Zest is a Subcompact sedan produced by Tata Motors. The car was revealed at Indian Auto Expo 2014 along with its hatchback version, the Tata Bolt. The car was launched in Indian markets on 12 August 2014.

The Zest is part of Tata's Falcon programme and is based on existing platforms on the Tata Indica Vista and Indigo Manza are built. The car is built by Tata Motors at Ranjangaon factory.

== Variants ==
The Zest is available in petrol and diesel versions; the Fiat-sourced 1.3-litre Quadrajet diesel engine (in two states of tune 75 PS and 90 PS) which is already being used on Indica Vista and Manza and the petrol version of is powered by a new Revotron 1.2-litre turbocharged, 90 PS engine. All come with a 5-speed manual transmission, with the option of an automated manual on diesel versions.

The Zest range includes XE, XM, XMA, XMS and XT trim options.

Tata Motors launched the new Zest Quadrajet 1.3 XTA as a top end variant. The trim gets an AMT transmission that is mated to 1.3-litre Quadrajet diesel engine that is capable of producing 90 PS of power with max torque output of 200 Nm.

Following the launch of the Tata Tigor on 29 March 2017, the Zest was discontinued for private purchase and could only be bought as a taxi. It was permanently discontinued in April 2019. It nearly sold 1.5 lakh units.

== International markets ==
Tata Motors also launched the Zest in Nepal. It is the company’s first product under the HORIZONEXT umbrella. It is available across Nepal in over 18 Tata Motors passenger vehicle sales outlets.

== Safety ==
The Zest for India with no airbags nor ABS received 0 stars for adult occupants and 1 star for toddlers from Global NCAP 1.0 in 2016 (similar to Latin NCAP 2013).

Global NCAP 1.0 test results (India) Tata Zest – No Airbags (2016, similar to Latin NCAP 2013)
Test	Score	Stars
Adult occupant protection	0.00/17.00	0 /5 stars
Child occupant protection	12.11/49.00	1 /5 stars

The Zest for India with 2 airbags and no ABS received 4 stars for adult occupants and 2 stars for toddlers from Global NCAP 1.0 in 2016 (similar to Latin NCAP 2013).

Global NCAP 1.0 test results (India) Tata Zest – No Airbags (2016, similar to Latin NCAP 2013)
Test	Score	Stars
Adult occupant protection	11.15/17.00	4 /5 stars
Child occupant protection	15.52/49.00	2 /5 stars
