= Pratap Bose =

Indian automotive designer

- Born: 1974 (age 51–52); Mumbai, India
- Education: Graduation in Industrial Design
- Alma mater: National Institute of Design, Ahmedabad

Pratap Bose (born 1974) is an Indian born British automotive designer currently working in Mahindra and Mahindra. Before joining Mahindra, Pratap had been working in Tata Motors for 14 years. He had designed several models for Tata, including Tigor, Tiago, Nexon, Tata Harrier and new Safari. Bose was also shortlisted for World Car Person of the Year 2021.

== Education ==
Pratap studied Industrial Design at the National Institute of Design, then graduated from the Royal College of Art in London with an MA in Vehicle Design in 2003.
