= New Car Assessment Program =

Government car safety evaluation program

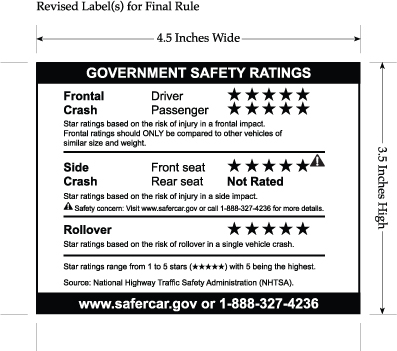
Consumer information label for a vehicle with at least one NCAP star rating

A New Car Assessment Program (or Programme, NCAP) is a government car safety program tasked with evaluating new automobile designs for performance against various safety threats.

== History ==
The first NCAP was created in 1979, by the United States National Highway Traffic Safety Administration. This program was established in response to Title II of the Motor Vehicle Information and Cost Savings Act of 1972, to encourage manufacturers to build safer vehicles and consumers to buy them. Over time, the agency improved the program by adding rating programs, facilitating access to test results, and revising the format of the information to make it easier for consumers to understand. NHTSA asserts the program has influenced manufacturers to build vehicles that consistently achieve high ratings.

The first standardized, 35 mph front crash test was May 21, 1979, and the first results were released October 15 that year. The agency established a frontal impact test protocol based on Federal Motor Vehicle Safety Standard 208 (“Occupant Crash Protection”), except that the frontal 4 NCAP test is conducted at 56 km/h (35 mph), rather than 48 km/h (30 mph) as required by FMVSS No. 208.

The European program, Euro NCAP, was founded in 1997 by the Transport Research Laboratory for the UK Department for Transport and backed by several European governments, as well as by the European Union. Based in Brussels, Belgium, the European program was modeled on the American program. Other areas with similar programs include Australia and New Zealand with ANCAP, Latin America with Latin NCAP, China with C-NCAP and India with Bharat NCAP. Global NCAP usually covers crash test for regions which are underserved and doesn't have a proper crash testing procedure. It conducts crash tests in South Africa, under its Safer Cars for Africa project. It used to conduct crash testing cars for Indian Market under its "Safer Cars for India" initiative but now those testing role have been taken over by Bharat NCAP for Indian market. In Russia, the AutoReview Car Assessment Program (ARCAP) has been conducting consumer crash tests but is not recognized as an NCAP and often uses subjective evaluation methods on a case-to-case basis.

In the 2000s, the American agency sought to improve the dissemination of NCAP ratings and as a result of the Safe, Accountable, Flexible, Efficient Transportation Equity Act: A Legacy for Users (SAFETEA–LU). It did so by issuing a Final Rule requiring manufacturers to place NCAP star ratings on the Monroney sticker (automobile price sticker). The rule has a September 1, 2007 compliance date.

In 2022, under the Infrastructure Law and reacting to recommendations from the Alliance for Automotive Innovation, the American agency introduced a new proposal for updating its version of NCAP. The proposal included four new technologies in driver assistance - Blind spot monitoring and intervention, electronic lane-keeping, and computerized emergency braking systems protecting pedestrians. This was the first time NCAP addressed the safety of individuals outside of a vehicle. The proposal also makes provision for a 10-year road map to keep up with the latest innovation and technology.

In June 2022, the US NCAP received criticism from the National Transportation Safety Board which considers that the 5-Star Safety Rating Program that Americans use “fails consumers” by not including collision avoidance system and other technologies. When compared to the European Euro NCAP, the NHTSA rating system lacks forward collision warning and automatic emergency braking systems, lane departure warning systems, driver monitoring systems, and other active and passive component designed to also protect pedestrians and bicyclists, according to NTSB.

== Organisations ==
Different NCAPs are:

Name	Abbreviation	Founded	Location
United States New Car Assessment Program	US NCAP (U.S. NCAP)	1978	Washington, DC, United States
Insurance Institute for Highway Safety	IIHS	1959, first crash test 1969, ratings from 1995	Arlington, VA, United States
Australasian New Car Assessment Program	ANCAP	1993	Canberra, Australia
Japan New Car Assessment Programme	JNCAP	1995	Tokyo, Japan
European New Car Assessment Programme	Euro NCAP	1996	Leuven, Belgium
Korean New Car Assessment Programme	KNCAP	1999	Seoul, South Korea
China – New Car Assessment Programme	C-NCAP	2006	Tianjin, China
Latin New Car Assessment Programme	Latin NCAP	2010	Montevideo, Uruguay
New Car Assessment Program for Southeast Asia	ASEAN NCAP	2011	Kajang, Selangor, Malaysia
Global New Car Assessment Programme	Global NCAP	2011	London, UK
Taiwan New Car Assessment Program	TNCAP	2018, ratings from 2023	Changhua, Taiwan
Green NCAP (operated by Euro NCAP for emissions)	Green NCAP	2019	Leuven, Belgium
Bharat New Car Assessment Program	Bharat NCAP	2023	Pune, India
