= Punch shot =

Punch shot or Punchshot or Punch-shot may refer to:

- A type of shot in pickleball
- A type of shot in golf

== See also ==
- Punch
