= Tata Tigor =

Subcompact sedan produced by Tata Motors

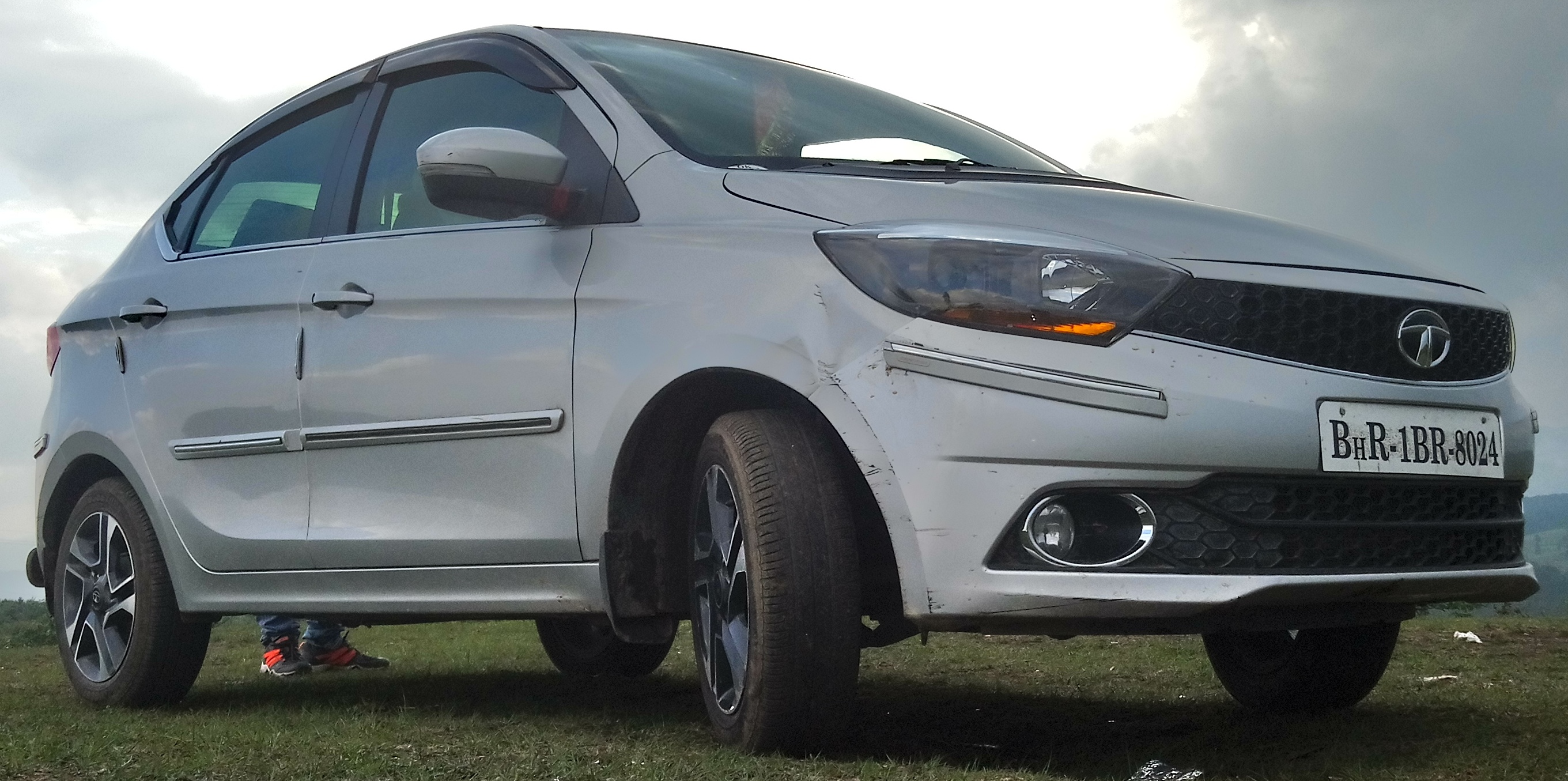

Overview
- Manufacturer: Tata Motors
- Also called: Tata X Pres-T (Fleet); Tata Aeris (3rd facelift)
- Production: 2017–2026 (Tigor); 2026–present (Aeris)
- Assembly: India: Sanand (Sanand Plant)

Body and chassis
- Class: Subcompact car (B)
- Body style: 4-door sedan
- Layout: Front-engine, front-wheel-drive
- Platform: Tata X1
- Related: Tata Tiago; Tata Nexon

Powertrain
- Engine: 1.2 L Revotron I3 (petrol/CNG); 1.2 L Revotron Turbo I3 (petrol); 1.05 L Revotorq I3 (diesel)
- Electric motor: 55 kW Ziptron Permanent Magnet Synchronous Motor (Tigor EV); 30 kW Electra 2 V 3-Phase AC Induction Motor (Tata X Pres-T EV)
- Transmission: 5-speed manual 5-speed AMT
- Battery: 26 kWh LFP

Dimensions
- Wheelbase: 2,450 mm (96.5 in)
- Length: 3,995 mm (157.3 in)
- Width: 1,677 mm (66.0 in)
- Height: 1,532 mm (60.3 in)

Chronology
- Predecessor: Tata Zest

The Tata Tigor is a subcompact sedan manufactured by Tata Motors in India based on the Tata Tiago hatchback. It was launched in India in March 2017.

== History ==
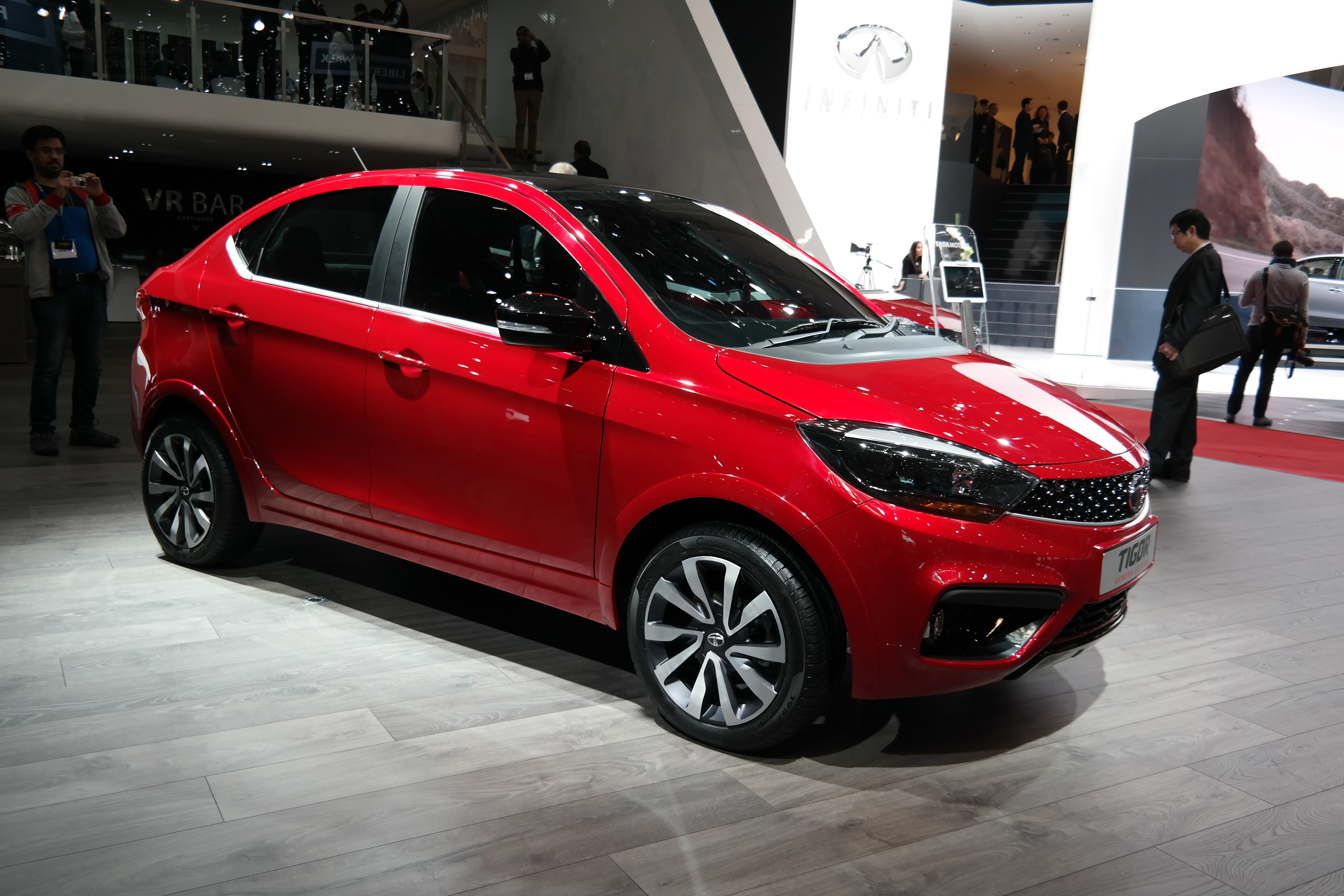
Tigor concept car at Geneva Motor Show

The Tata Tigor was born directly from the same project that originated the Tata Tiago (internally called Kite 5) as it represents the four-door sedan version with a third rear volume. The Kite project was born in 2013 with the aim of developing two new compact cars, modern and inexpensive to offer on the Indian market in place of the Tata Zest and Bolt models that did not have the desired success as they were nothing but the profound restyling of the previous Indica Vista and Indigo Manza. In particular, Tigor replaces the Tata Zest.

Compared to the Zest the Tata Tigor is slightly shorter than a few millimeters, and even the pace measures only two millimeters less, the overall length is 3.994 meters as in India the cars that fall within the 4 meters limit enjoy tax breaks. The defects that manifested the old Zest were the rather small trunk with a capacity of only 370 liters and limited opening due to the rear lamps too intrusive. The Tigor instead offers a 419 liters trunk and the size of the rear lights have been reduced as well as being divided into two elements (on the Zest the headlight was in one piece). This large boot has been made possible, due to the presence of hinges, near the boot opening. Moreover, the Tigor has a fastback–like styling and as a result, the boot opening has been made much larger.

The official presentation of Tigor takes place at Auto Expo 2016 in pre-production version with still the design name Kite 5, while only in 2017 is the official Tigor name announced for the model and consequently the official production starts with sales instead of start in March of the same year on the Indian market.

Like the Tata Tiago, also Tigor uses the Tata X1 platform, re-engineered respect to the old platform version used by Indica and later by Bolt. The wheelbase compared to the Tiago is stretched by 5 centimeters to increase the rear habitability. The Tigor is front-wheel drive, the suspension uses a very classic scheme: MacPherson front end with stabilizer bar, wheeled rear axle with twist bridge. Front disc and rear drum brakes.

The engine range consists of the petrol 1.2-liter Revotron three-cylinder 12 V that delivers 85 horsepower and 114 N⋅m of maximum torque with a 5-speed manual transmission or 5-speed automatic and a diesel 1.1-liter Revotorq three-cylinder common rail 70 horsepower 12 V delivering 140 N⋅m of maximum torque, combined with a 5-speed manual transmission. Like Tiago, Tigor is produced only with right-hand drive and is not expected to be imported into Europe.

=== JTP version ===
In October 2018, Tata launched a sporty Tigor JTP along with Tata Tiago JTP. The 1.2-liter turbocharged Revotron petrol engine is tuned to deliver 112 horsepower and 150 N⋅m of peak torque. Tata has a claimed 0–100 km/h in 10 seconds.

Tata Also launched the CNG Version named Tigor i-CNG, and in February 2024 AMT CNG was launched

== First facelift (2020) ==
The first facelift of the Tigor was launched in India on 22 January 2020, adopting a revised front fascia inspired by the Tata Altroz, LED daytime running lights, and a BS6-compliant 1.2-litre petrol engine, while the 1.05-litre diesel engine was discontinued.

== Second facelift (2025) ==
The second facelift of the Tigor was launched in India on 10 January 2025, featuring revised front and rear styling, a 10.25-inch touchscreen infotainment system with wireless Android Auto and Apple CarPlay, a 360-degree camera, and a digital instrument cluster, while retaining its 1.2-litre petrol and CNG powertrains.

== Tata Aeris (third facelift; 2026) ==
Tata Motors launched the third facelift of the Tigor as the Tata Aeris in India on 25 September 2026, retiring the Tigor nameplate. The Aeris is a sub-four-meter compact sedan with a notchback roofline, updated Tiago-inspired front and rear styling, LED lighting, and a revised interior featuring a 10.25-inch touchscreen, digital instrument cluster, wireless smartphone connectivity, rear air vents, and connected-car features.

It is sold in Smart, Pure, Pure+, Creative and Accomplished trims, with an introductory ex-showroom price beginning at ₹5.29 lakh.The Aeris retains a 1.2-litre three-cylinder Revotron petrol engine producing 86 PS (63 kW) and 113 N⋅m (83 lb⋅ft), paired with a five-speed manual or five-speed AMT gearbox; a factory-fitted CNG version produces 75.5 PS (56 kW) and 96.5 N⋅m (71 lb⋅ft). The car measures 3,995 mm (157.3 in) long, 1,684 mm (66.3 in) wide and 1,532 mm (60.3 in) high, with a 2,450 mm (96.5 in) wheelbase and a 419-litre boot.

== Tigor EV ==
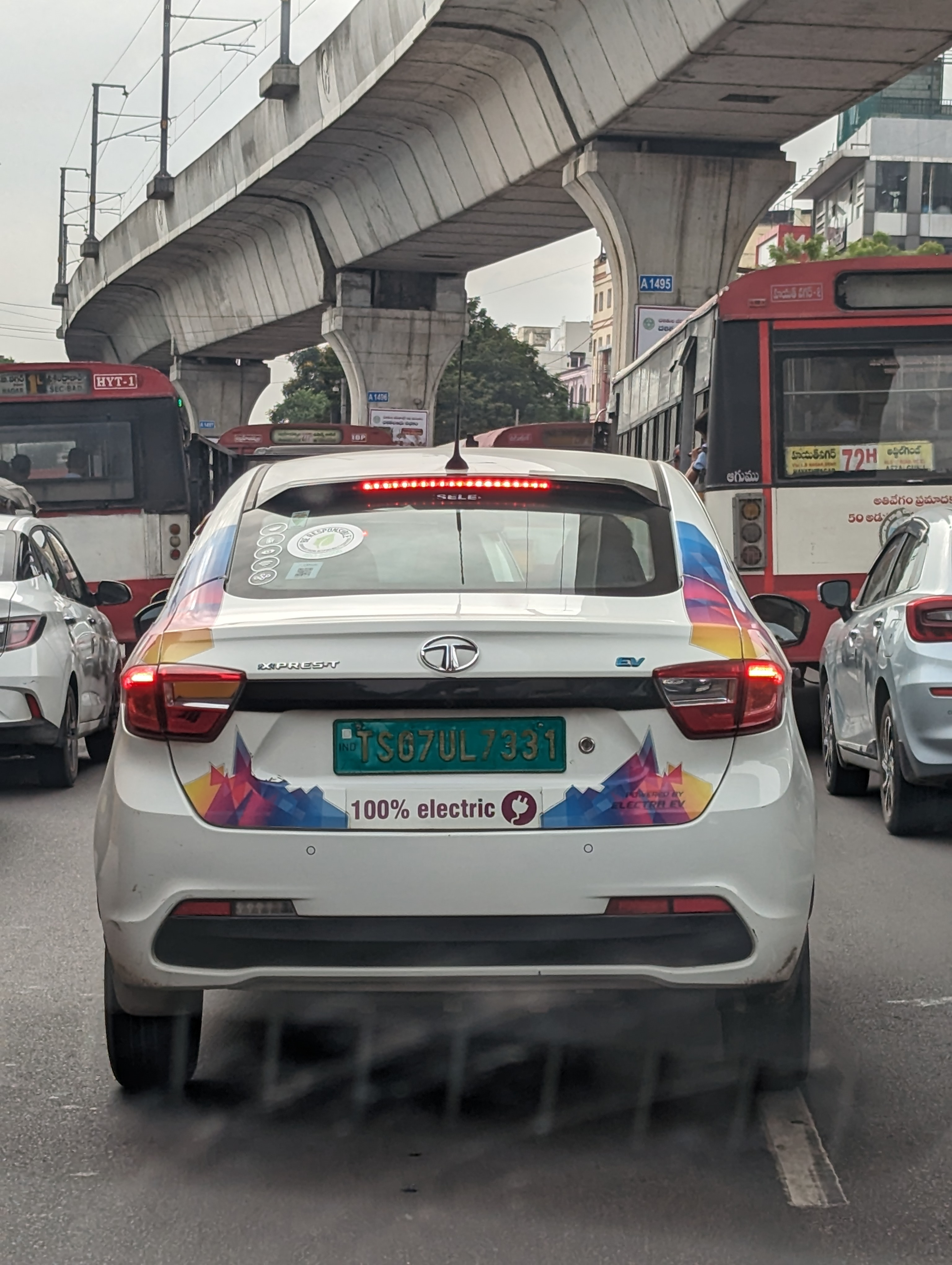
2021 Tata X Pres-T EV (rear view)

In October 2019, Tata Motors has launched the Tigor EV (stylized as Tigor.ev) for taxi owners. It has extended the range from 142 km to 213 km on a single charge according to ARAI certification. It is reported that the Tigor EV will be the cheapest electric car available for commercial buyers. In 2021 the Tata Tigor EV was renamed as XPRES-T. On 31 August 2021, Tata Motors has launched the new Tigor EV in India with 4 variants XE, XM, XZ+ and XZ+ (O), with ARAI claimed range of 306 km in a single charge, which adopts the brand's ZipTron powertrain shared with the Nexon EV. On 23 November 2022, Tata Motors has launched the new Tigor.ev with an extended ARAI claim range of 315 km. This updated version gets some new tech and features to the car.

== Safety ==
In 2020, The Tigor/Tiago crash tested in Global NCAP (similar to Latin NCAP 2013) scoring four stars for adult occupant protection and three stars for child occupant protection. Tiago/Tigor offers dual airbags as standard across all the variants. However its bodyshell integrity and footwell area are rated as unstable. Head and neck protection for adult occupants was good. Chest protection for passenger was adequate and marginal for the driver. Femur and knees showed marginal protection as there is risk of contracting dangerous structures behind the fascia. The child seat for the 3 year old was installed FWF with the adult seatbelt and support leg and was able to prevent excessive forward movement during the impact, protecting the head and offering fair protection to the chest. The 18 month old CRS was installed using the adult belt and support leg rearward facing and the protection offered to the 1.5 years old dummy was good. The Tigor/Tiago does not offer three point belt in all seating positions and does not offer ISOFIX anchorages. The car does not offer the possibility of disconnecting the passenger airbag in case a rearward facing CRS needs to be installed in the front passenger seat. It scored a maximum of 12.52 points on a scale of 17 for adult occupant safety and 34.15 points on a scale of 49 for child occupant safety.

Global NCAP 1.0 test results Tata Tigor/Tiago – 2 Airbags (2020, similar to Latin NCAP 2013)
Test	Score	Stars
Adult occupant protection	12.52/17.00	4 /5 stars
Child occupant protection	34.15/49.00	3 /5 stars

=== Tigor EV ===
Tata Tigor EV for India crash test rated 4 stars in Global NCAP 1.0 in 2021 (similar to Latin NCAP 2013).

Global NCAP 1.0 test results (India) Tata Tigor EV (*) – 2 Airbags (2021, similar to Latin NCAP 2013)
Test	Score	Stars
Adult occupant protection	12.00/17.00	4 /5 stars
Child occupant protection	37.24/49.00	4 /5 stars
