= Prunts =

Prunts may be:

- the plural of prunt
- the Kashmiri name of the city of Poonch and the respective district
