= Poonch =

Poonch, sometimes also spelt Punch and Punchh, may refer to:

- Poonch, a semi-autonomous district and region of the princely state of Jammu and Kashmir in British India, see History of Poonch
- It was split after the Indo-Pakistani war of 1947–1948 between:
  - Poonch district, India
    - Poonch (town), the headquarters of the Indian district of Poonch
  - Poonch Division, in Azad Kashmir, Pakistan, which includes
    - Poonch District, Pakistan
- Poonch River, a river flowing through the historical Poonch region
- Poonch Fort, a fort located in Poonch town, India

== See also ==
- Poonchh, Jhansi, a village in Uttar Pradesh, India
- Poonchi (disambiguation)
- Punch (disambiguation)
- 1947 Poonch rebellion
- Military operations in Poonch (1948)
