= Tata Revotron engine =

Revotron Engine

Overview
- Manufacturer: Tata Motors
- Production: 2014-present

Layout
- Configuration: Inline-3
- Displacement: 1.2 L (1,199 cc)
- Cylinder bore: 77 mm (3.0 in)
- Piston stroke: 85.8 mm (3.38 in)
- Compression ratio: 10.8:1

Combustion
- Fuel type: Gasoline, CNG

Output
- Power output: 86 PS (85 hp; 63 kW), 110 PS (110 hp; 81 kW) (turbo, 2017-2020); 120 PS (120 hp; 88 kW) (turbo, 2020-present); 74 PS (73 hp; 54 kW) (iCNG in Tiago & Tigor)

The Tata Revotron engine is a 1.2-liter 3-cylinder petrol engine. It is produced by Tata Motors and was used in their passenger vehicles beginning in 2014.

== History ==
The Revotron series began with a 1.2-liter, 4-cylinder turbocharged engine introduced in 2014 for the Bolt and Zest. This engine featured a single overhead camshaft with two valves per cylinder and multi-point fuel injection. It delivered 88 hp (65 kW) at 5,000 rpm and 100 lb⋅ft (140 N⋅m) of torque between 1,500 and 4,500 rpm. It included multiple driving modes for improved response, a smart engine control unit, an eight-holed fuel injector, a reinforced crankcase, and an updated exhaust system.

In 2015, Tata showcased a 1.2-liter, 3-cylinder naturally-aspirated version, later used in the Tiago and Tigor. It offered a dual overhead camshaft driven by a timing chain, variable valve timing, exhaust gas recirculation, a variable oil pump, and four valves per cylinder with hydraulic adjusters.

A turbocharged 1.2-liter, 3-cylinder variant debuted in 2017 with the Nexon, adding a turbocharger and intercooler. Despite competitors using direct injection, it retained multi-point fuel injection, producing 110 hp (81 kW) and 130 lb⋅ft (170 N⋅m).

A more powerful version, offering 120 hp (88 kW), arrived in 2020 with the BS6-compliant Nexon facelift, still using multi-point fuel injection.

In January 2021, Tata launched a turbocharged Revotron engine for the Altroz iTurbo variant, delivering 110 hp (81 kW) and 100 lb⋅ft (140 N⋅m). The lower output aimed to distinguish it from the Nexon and address fitment issues with the Nexon’s larger 6-speed manual transmission.

In January 2022, Tata introduced CNG variants for the Tiago and Tigor, branded as iCNG, marking the company's first cars with this fuel option. This engine produces 72.5 hp (54.1 kW) and 70 lb⋅ft (95 N⋅m) of torque, paired with a 5-speed manual gearbox, and can start directly in CNG mode, a unique feature. The Punch and Altroz later received iCNG versions.

In January 2023, Tata unveiled the Altroz Racer, a sportier version with the same 120 hp (88 kW) as the Nexon, enabled by a 6-speed manual gearbox. Production was confirmed, potentially replacing the slower-selling iTurbo.

== Applications ==
Applications of the Revotron engine include:

- Tata Bolt (2014-2019)
- Tata Zest (2014-2019)
- Tata Tiago (2016-present)
- Tata Tigor (2016-present)
- Tata Altroz (2019-present, non-turbo / 2021-present, turbo)
- Tata Nexon (2017-2020, 110 PS turbo / 2020-present, 120PS turbo)
- Tata Punch (2021-present)

== See also ==
- Tata Motors
