= Punch (nickname) =

Punch is a nickname of:

- Bae Jin-young, better known by her stage name Punch, a South Korean singer
- Punch Andrews, American record producer and music manager
- David Tennant Cowan (1896–1983), British major general
- Punch Imlach (1918–1987), Canadian Hall-of-Fame ice hockey coach and general manager
- Punch Knoll (1881–1960), Major League Baseball player
- Punch Miller (1894–1971), American Dixieland jazz trumpeter
- Punch Sulzberger (1926–2012), American publisher and businessman

== See also ==
- Punch (disambiguation)
