= Punch =

Punch commonly refers to:

- Punch (combat), a strike made using the hand closed into a fist
- Punch (drink), a wide assortment of drinks, non-alcoholic or alcoholic, generally containing fruit or fruit juice

Punch or punches may also refer to:

== Places ==
- Punch, U.S. Virgin Islands
- Poonch (disambiguation), often spelt as Punch, several places in India and Pakistan

== People ==
- Punch (surname), a list of people with the name
- Punch (nickname), a list of people with the nickname
- Punch Masenamela (born 1986), South African footballer
- Punch (rapper), 21st century American rapper Terrence Louis Henderson Jr.
- Punch (singer), South Korean singer Bae Jin-young (born 1993)

== Animals ==
- Punch (monkey), baby Japanese macaque

== Arts, entertainment and media ==
=== Fictional entities ===
- Mr. Punch (also known as Pulcinella or Pulcinello), the principal puppet character in the traditional Punch and Judy puppet show
- Mr. Punch, the masthead image and nominal editor of Punch, largely borrowed from the puppet show
- Mr. Punch, a fictional character in Neil Gaiman's graphic novel, The Tragical Comedy or Comical Tragedy of Mr. Punch (1994)
- Punch, a DC Comics villain and partner of Jewelee's in Punch and Jewelee
- Punch/Counterpunch, a fictional character in The Transformers

=== Films ===
- Punch (1994 film), a boxing film starring Donald Sutherland
- Punch (2002 film), a Canadian film
- Punch (2011 film), a South Korean film
- Punch (2022 film), a New Zealand film starring Tim Roth
- Punch, a 1996 American short film starring Sacha Baron Cohen

=== Music ===
- Punch (band), an American punk band
- Punch Records, a UK music and arts development agency
- Punch (album), a 2008 album by Punch Brothers featuring Chris Thile
- Punch, a 2013 album by indie-pop group Autoheart
- Punches (album), album by World Leader Pretend
- "Punches" (MØ song), song by Danish singer and songwriter MØ

=== Periodicals ===
- Punch (Danish magazine), an illustrated conservative Danish satirical magazine (1873–1894)
- Punch (magazine), a former British weekly magazine of humour and satire
- Adelaide Punch (1878–1884), a satirical magazine published in Adelaide, South Australia
- Japan Punch (1862–1887), a satirical magazine published in Yokohama, Japan
- Melbourne Punch (1855–1925), a satirical magazine published in Melbourne, Australia
- Sydney Punch (1864–1888), a satirical magazine published in Sydney, Australia
- The Punch (Australia), news website (2009–2013)
- The Punch, Nigerian daily newspaper

=== Television ===
- Punch (TV series), a 2014 South Korean television drama series
- Punch, a station identification for the television station BBC Choice, used in 1998
- Punch! (TV series), a Canadian animated comedy series
- Producciones PUNCH (often shortened to PUNCH), a Colombian programadora from 1956 to 2000
- "The Punch" (Billions), a 2016 episode
- "Punch" (Space Ghost Coast to Coast), a 1994 episode

=== Theatre ===
- Punch (play), a 2024 British play

=== Other ===
- Punch!, a 2005 manga by Rie Takada
- Punch, a drinks website owned by Vox Media

== Tools ==
- Punch (numismatics), an intermediate used in the process of manufacturing coins
- Punch (tool), a tool used to drive objects such as nails, to pierce workpieces, or to form an impression of the tip on a workpiece
- Punch (typography), a steel pattern used in casting metal type
- Hole punch, a common office tool used to create holes in sheets of paper
- Leather punch, a specialized tool for making holes in leather

== Other uses ==
- Punch (cigar), the name of two brands of premium cigar
- Punch Taverns, a United Kingdom pub company
- Dodona (genus), a group of butterflies commonly known as the Punches, in particular:
  - Dodona eugenes, a Dodona commonly known as the Punch
- Polarimeter to Unify the Corona and Heliosphere (PUNCH), a NASA constellation of 4 microsatellites to study the Sun
- Tata Punch, an Indian SUV manufactured by Tata Motors since 2021

== See also ==
- Punch Brothers, an American band
- Punches (album), a 2005 album by World Leader Pretend
- Punch shearing, a failure mode of plate floors, see bearing capacity
- Punsch, a traditional Swedish and Finnish liquor
- Poonch (disambiguation)
