= Tata Punch =

Crossover city car

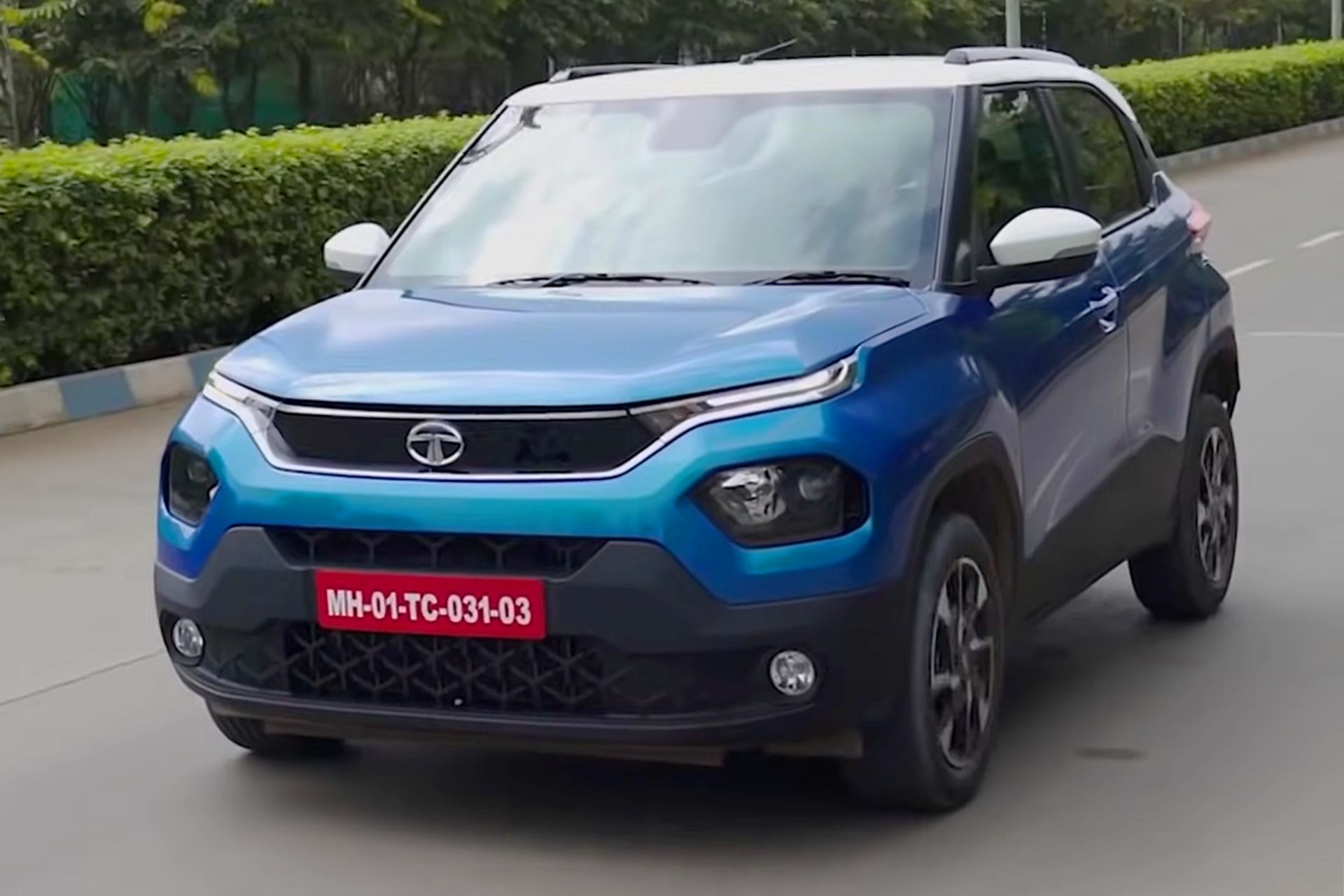

Overview
- Manufacturer: Tata Motors Cars
- Also called: Tata Punch.ev (electric)
- Production: 2021–present
- Assembly: India: Ranjangaon, Pune (FIAL)
- Designer: Martin Uhlarik & Pratap Bose

Body and chassis
- Class: Crossover city car (A-segment)
- Body style: 5-door crossover SUV
- Layout: Front-engine, front-wheel-drive
- Platform: ALFA-ARC platform
- Related: Tata Altroz

Powertrain
- Engine: Petrol: 1.2 L Revotron I3; Petrol/CNG: 1.2 L Revotron I3
- Transmission: 5-speed manual; 5-speed AMT; 6-speed manual

Dimensions
- Wheelbase: 2,445 mm (96.3 in)
- Length: 3,800 mm (149.6 in)
- Width: 1,742 mm (68.6 in)
- Height: 1,615 mm (63.6 in)

The Tata Punch is a crossover city car (A-segment) manufactured by Tata Motors Cars since 2021. Positioned as the smallest SUV of the brand below the Nexon, the Punch is built on ALFA-ARC platform shared with the Altroz hatchback.

== Details ==
The concept was revealed as H2X compact SUV (codenamed Hornbill) at the 89th Geneva International Motor Show in 2019, followed by the near-production HBX concept at the Auto Expo 2020. On 23 August 2021, the vehicle was revealed with the name Punch. The car was unveiled on 4 October 2021. It is powered by a 1.2-litre Revotron three-cylinder petrol engine which is shared with the Altroz, Tiago, and Tigor.

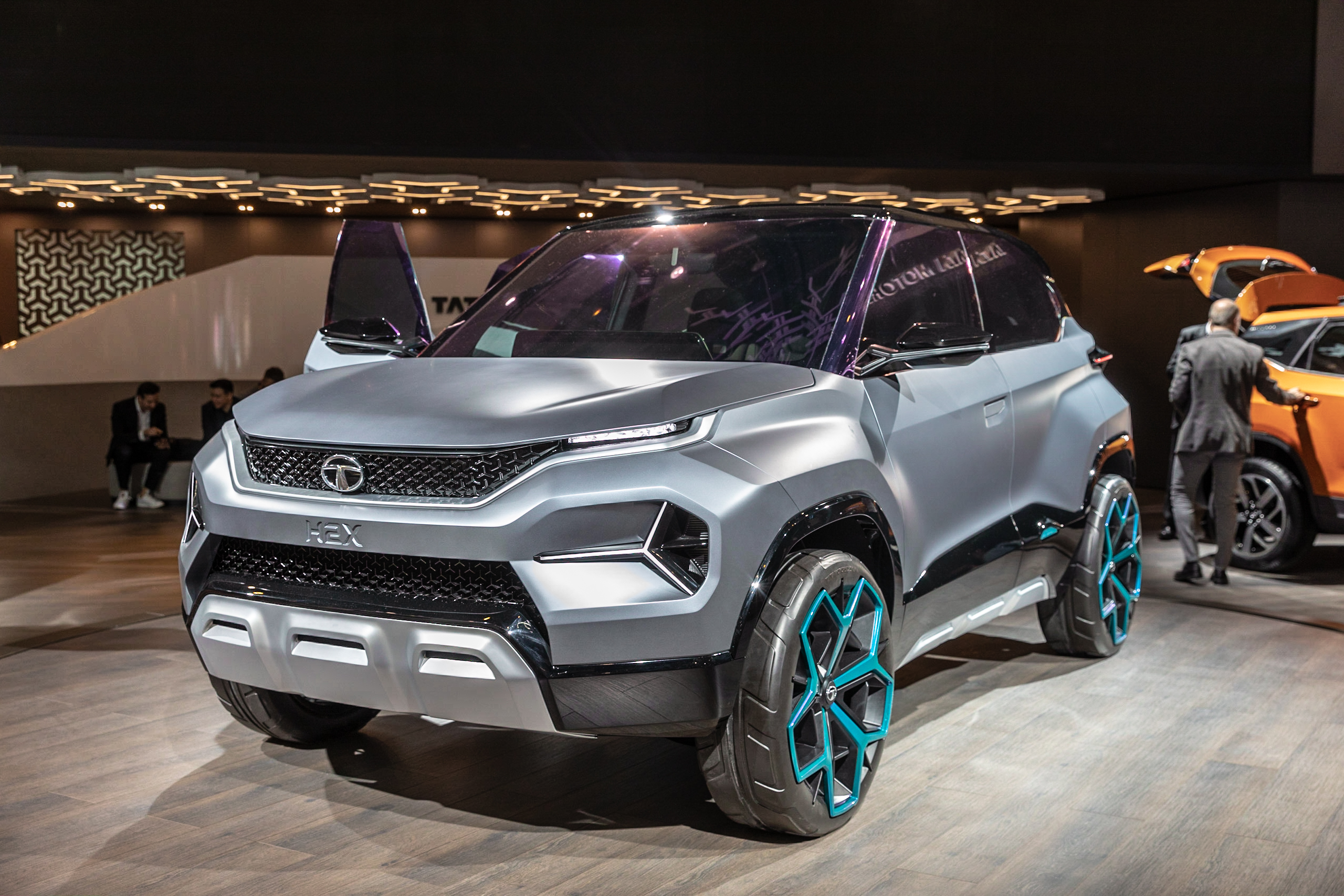
Tata H2X concept, which previewed the Punch

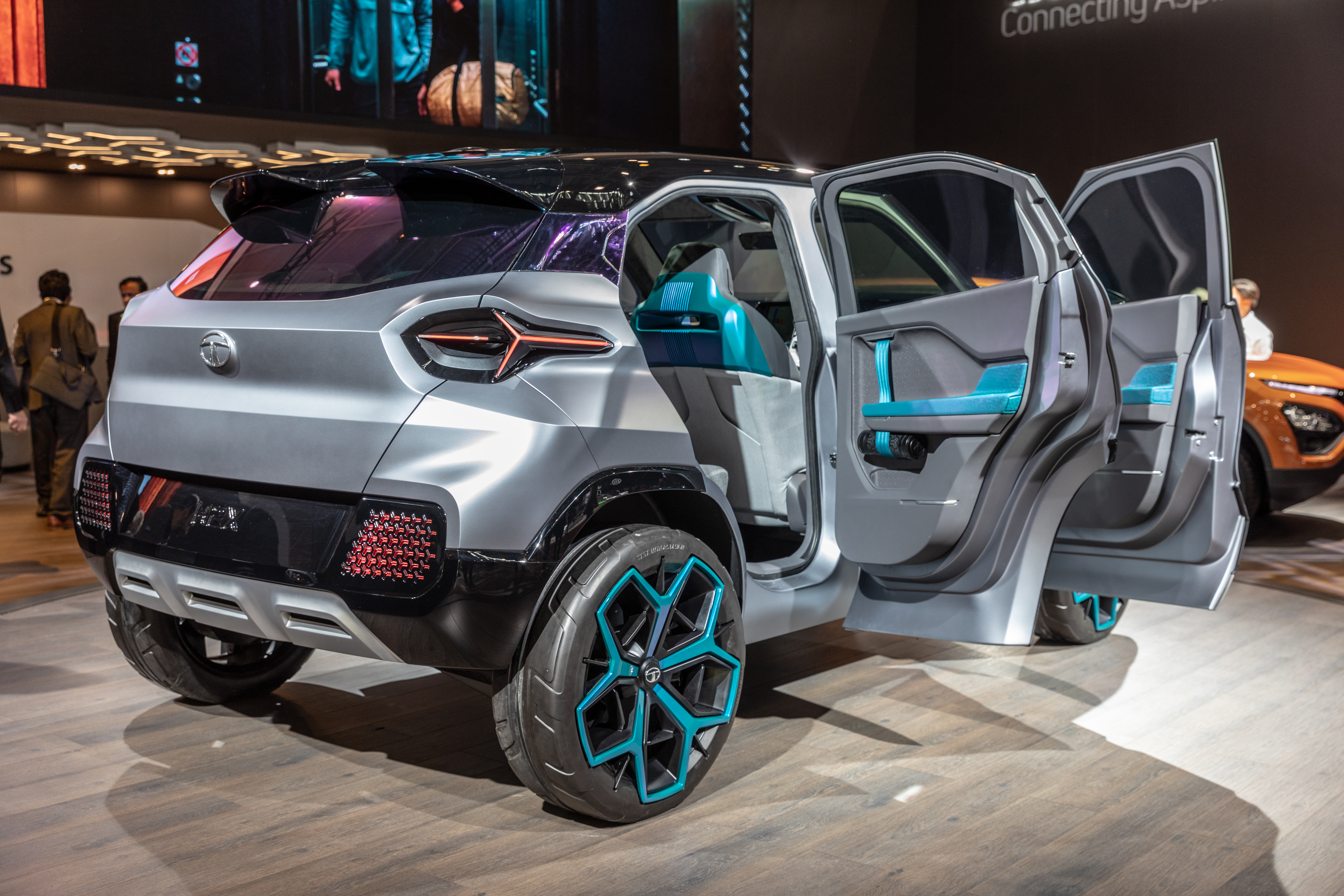
Rear view of Tata H2X concept

== Tata Punch.ev ==
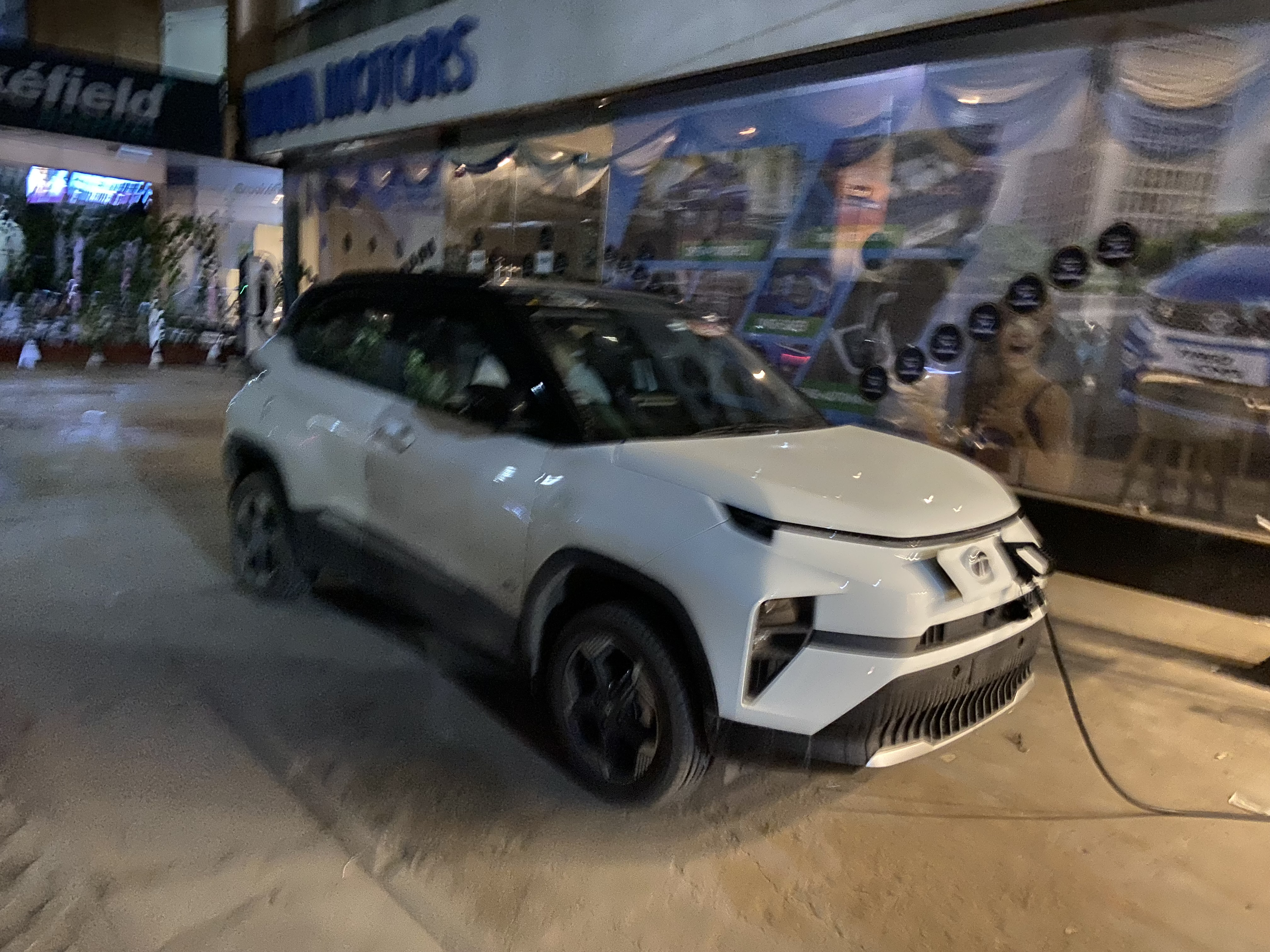
Tata Punch EV in public charging station

The Punch.ev was unveiled on 5 January 2024. The Punch.ev is the first product to be based on its Pure EV architecture – acti.ev (Advanced Connected Tech-Intelligent Electric Vehicle) and will support future products from the Tata Passenger Electric Mobility portfolio.

The Punch is offered in 2 variants: Punch.ev and Punch.ev Long Range. Both of them are offered in 5 trims: Smart, Smart+, Adventure, Empowered, and Empowered+.

=== 2026 facelift ===
The Punch.ev facelift was revealed on 8 February 2026, and launched on 20 February 2026. Punch.ev facelift comes with a 40 kWh battery pack, offering a claimed range of up to 468 km. It can accelerate from 1 to 100 km/h in under 9 seconds.

== 2026 facelift ==
The facelift Punch was launched on 13 January 2026. The facelift features refreshed exterior styling with slimmer LED DRLs, a new grille, connected LED taillights, and new alloy wheels, drawing inspiration from the Punch EV. Inside, it includes a 10.25-inch touchscreen, matching digital driver's display, ventilated seats, a 360-degree camera, and an updated steering wheel.

== Safety ==
The Tata Punch is equipped with a comprehensive array of safety features designed to enhance passenger protection. These include dual front airbags, an Anti-lock Braking System (ABS) with Electronic Brakeforce Distribution (EBD), and rear defoggers. The vehicle also features rear parking sensors, a rear-view camera, and a tyre pressure monitoring system (TPMS). For added safety, the Tata Punch is fitted with ISOFIX anchors for securing child seats.

=== Global NCAP ===
Global NCAP 1.0 test results (India) Tata Punch – 2 Airbags (2021, similar to Latin NCAP 2013)
Test	Score	Stars
Adult occupant protection	16.45/17.00	5 /5 stars
Child occupant protection	40.89/49.00	4 /5 stars

The Tata Punch for India was crash-tested by Global NCAP 1.0 in 2021 (similar to Latin NCAP 2013) in its most basic safety specification of two airbags, anti-lock brakes and ISOFIX anchorages. It achieved the maximum five star rating for adult protection, showing a stable passenger compartment in the frontal offset crash, negligible pedal intrusion and no rupture of the footwell. Every body region showed either acceptable or good protection in the frontal crash. The Punch is fitted with a pretensioner even for the lower anchorage of the driver's seatbelt, which helped Tata demonstrate (using a complex Euro NCAP sled test) that sharp structures behind the fascia would not increase risk of injury to the knees of differently sized occupants.

The Punch was also required to pass an ECE regulatory side impact test to achieve the maximum five star rating. The Punch is not fitted with side airbags but could pass the requirements of this minimum regulatory test.

Tata chose to place both child occupants facing rearward, following the latest i-Size recommendations. This helped the Punch achieve a full score for dynamics. However, Global NCAP noted that the Punch offers only a lap belt in the rear centre seat, which limited its score because this type of seatbelt cannot fit a universal child seat. This type of restraint can also seriously injure the spine or abdomen of an adult occupant in a crash.

The Punch does not offer electronic stability control, and it does not offer body or head protecting side airbags. EV version is provided with electronic stability control.

=== Bharat NCAP ===
In 2024, the Punch.ev for India received 5 stars for adult occupants and 5 stars for toddlers from Bharat NCAP (based on Latin NCAP 2016).

Bharat NCAP test results Tata Punch.ev (2024, based on Latin NCAP 2016)
Test	Score	Stars
Adult occupant protection	31.46/32.00	5 /5 stars
Child occupant protection	45.00/49.00	5 /5 stars

Bharat NCAP test results Tata Punch.ev (2026, based on Latin NCAP 2016)
Test	Score	Stars
Adult occupant protection	31.09/32.00	5 /5 stars
Child occupant protection	45.00/49.00	5 /5 stars

== Sales ==
Year	India
2021	22,571
2022	129,895
2023	150,182
2024	202,030
2025	173,502
