= Punshi =

Punshi is a surname. Notable people with the surname include:

- Darshan Punshi, Pakistani politician
- Rajit Punshi, Indian businessman
