= World Leader Pretend =

Alternative rock band

- Origin: New Orleans, Louisiana, U.S.
- Genres: Alternative rock, pop punk
- Years active: 2002–2008
- Label: Warner Bros. Records
- Past members: Keith Ferguson; Arthur Mintz; Alex Smith; Parker Hutchinson; Matt Martin
- Website: Myspace

World Leader Pretend was a five-person pop band from New Orleans, featuring Keith Ferguson (lead vocals), Parker Hutchinson (keyboards), Matt Martin (guitar), Arthur Mintz (drums), and Alex Smith (bass). The band took their name from the fifth song of R.E.M.'s 1988 album, Green.

Their first album, Fit For Faded was released in 2003 on Renaissance Records, a New Orleans label. In 2004, they were signed to Warner Bros. Records. An appearance at the first annual CMJ Cleveland and other North American tour dates coincided with the June 28, 2005 release of their major label debut, Punches.

The band broke up in early 2008, shortly after traveling to Seattle, Washington, to record their second major release, due to "artistic differences" within the band.

== Discography ==
=== Albums ===
- Fit For Faded (2003)
- Rubble-Rousing Misspent Bouts EP (2005)
- Punches (2005)
