= Punches (album) =

Studio album by World Leader Pretend
- Released: June 28, 2005
- Length: 51:24

World Leader Pretend chronology
Fit For Faded (2003)	Punches (2005)

Professional ratings
Review scores
Source	Rating
Allmusic	4/5 stars
Pitchfork	6.5/10

Punches is an album by World Leader Pretend, released in 2005 on Warner Brother Records. The album was self-produced, and mixed chiefly by Ben Hiller.

== Track listing ==
1. "Bang Theory" – 4:39
2. "Dreamdaddy" – 4:26
3. "New Voices" – 3:54
4. "Punches" – 3:51
5. "Lovey Dovey" – 2:23
6. "Harps" – 0:43
7. "The Masses" – 5:39
8. "Tit for Tat" – 3:50
9. "Appassionato" – 1:39
10. "B.A.D.A.B.O.O.M." – 2:34
11. "Into Thin Air" – 5:09
12. "A Horse of a Different" – 3:28
13. "A Grammarian Stuck in a Medical Drama" – 8:05
14. "Catch" – 1:04

== Other musicians ==
Some recordings include one or more of the following musicians who were not part of the band: Blair Gimma (vocals), David Torkanowsky (additional piano), Rebecca Barry (saxophones), Maurice Brown (trumpets), Molli Tate (French horn), and Steve Sudor (trombone). Members of the Louisiana Philharmonic Orchestra also provided string accompaniment on some tracks.
