= Rajit Punshi =

Indian businessman

- Born: Chandigarh, India
- Education: Sydenham Institute of Management Studies, Research and Entrepreneurship Education; St. Xavier's College, Kolkata
- Occupations: Founder and Managing Principal, The Operational Risk Practice Pte Ltd

Rajit Punshi is an Indian businessman who works in the operational risk industry. He was voted as one of the industry’s ‘Top 50 Faces in Operational Risk’ by Oprisk and Compliance magazine in 2008–09. He is the founder and managing principal at The Operational Risk Practice Pte. Ltd., Singapore.

== Awards and accolades ==
- Industry Thought Leader on Operational Risk and voted as one of industry’s ‘Top 50 Faces in Operational Risk’ by Oprisk and Compliance Magazine in 2008–09
- Past Board member of Operational Risk Exchange (ORX). Currently their Asia representative

== External speaking engagements ==
Year	Name of Conference/Event	Ref.
April 2012	Asian Banker Summit, Thailand	
2012	Marcus Evans – Operational Risk Conference	
2006	Bank of International Settlements – Financial Stability Group	
2007–2010	Financial Times (FT) Global Briefings	
2006–2010	Operational Risk Asia	
2007	Risk Minds Asia – Merits of the TSA Position	
July 2006	Risk Capital (Paris) – Why TSA is better than AMA?	
2010	Asian Financial Congress	
	Taiwan Banking Academy – Operational Risk Management Workshop for industry	
	UAE Central Bank – Operational Risk Roadshows for Basel 2	
