= Poonchh, Jhansi =

Village in India

Poonchh
- village
- Poonchh
- Location in Uttar Pradesh and in India Poonchh (India)
- Coordinates: 25.8216°N 79.0344°E
- Country: India
- State: Uttar Pradesh
- District: Jhansi
- Tehsil: Moth
- Elevation: 285 m (935 ft)

Population (2011)
  - Total: 7,518
- Time zone: UTC+5:30 (IST)
- PIN Code: 284306

Poonchh is a historic village in the Indian state of Uttar Pradesh. It is situated on national highway 27 in Moth Tehsil in the district of Jhansi, India.

It is situated near the river Betwa (5 kilometres (3.1 mi) far in the west of river Betwa) at an average elevation of 285 metres (935 ft). It is about 500 kilometres (310 mi) from the national capital New Delhi and 250 kilometres (160 mi) from the state capital Lucknow.

Poonchh is well connected to all other major towns in Uttar Pradesh by road and railway networks. It is situated on the east–west corridor (NH27), 70 kilometres (43 mi) from Jhansi to Kanpur road, and Srinagar to Kanyakumari north–south corridor passes closely to the district headquarters Jhansi.

== History ==
A couple of Kandor Ahir pastoralists supposedly migrated from Haryana and set up some huts at the bank of a lake (now called as Talaa) before 1600. Then many families migrated and set up huts, with the time a village grew up around it. The village was apparently called Poonchh. This village was used to be Ahir dominated village with a lower population of other castes.

During British Raj, the Jhansi railway station was built by the British in the late 1880s and laid a railway track from Jhansi to Kanpur. A small railway station (Name: Erich Road Station, Station Code: ERC, Station grade: E) was built in Poonchh during that time, marking the importance of this village/region. Railway station was named after a municipal town near Poonchh. This railway station was built to improve connectivity for British armed forces as they had an arms warehouse in this village.

== Geography and climate ==
Poonchh has an average elevation of 285 metres (935 feet). Poonchh lies on the plateau of central India, an area dominated by rocky relief and minerals underneath the soil. The village has a vast terai plains of Uttar Pradesh which is suitable for crops include wheat, pulses, peas, and oilseeds. The region relies heavily on monsoon the rains for irrigation purposes. The trade in agricultural products (including grain and oilseeds) is of great economic importance.

=== Climate ===
Poonchh experiences extreme temperatures. Winter begins in October with the retreat of the southwest monsoon (It does not experience any rainfall from the Northeast Monsoon) and peaks in mid-December. Temperatures are about 4 °C or 39.2 °F minimum and 21 °C or 69.8 °F maximum.

Spring arrives by the end of February and is a short-lived phase of transition.

Summer begins by April and summer temperatures can peak at 47 °C or 116.6 °F in May.

The rainy season starts by the third week of June (although this is variable year to year), while the monsoon rains gradually weaken in September and end before the last week of September. In the rainy season, the average daily high temperature hovers around 36 °C or 96.8 °F with high humidity. The average rainfall for the village is about 1,150 millimetres or 45 inches per year, occurring almost entirely within the three-and-a-half months of the Southwest Monsoon.

== Demographics ==
Poonchh is a large village with an area of 837.55 hectares and total 1280 families residing. The Poonchh village has population of 7518 of which 3919 are males while 3599 are females as per Population Census 2011.

In Poonchh village, population of children with age 0-6 is 920 which makes up 12.24% of total population of village. Average Sex Ratio of Poonchh village is 918 which is higher than Uttar Pradesh state average of 912. Child Sex Ratio for the Poonchh as per census is 866, lower than Uttar Pradesh average of 902.

Poonchh village has higher literacy rate compared to Uttar Pradesh. In 2011, literacy rate of Poonchh village was 81.86% compared to 67.68% of Uttar Pradesh. In Poonchh Male literacy stands at 91.80% while female literacy rate was 71.12%.

Particulars	Total	Male	Female
Total No. of Houses	1,280	-	-
Population	7,518	3,919	3,599
Child (0-6)	920	493	427
Schedule Caste	1,505	787	718
Schedule Tribe	0	0	0
Literacy	81.86 %	91.80 %	71.12 %
Total Workers	3,075	2,055	1,020

== Education ==
=== Higher Education ===
- Ramswaroop Yadav Mahavidhyalay
- Dr. J Verma ITI College

=== Schools ===
- Saraswati Gyan Mandir Higher Secondary School
- Subhash Higher Secondary School
- Bhagirath Higher Secondary School
- Shri Krishna Higher Secondary School
- Mayanand Gurukul Ashram Higher Secondary School
- Ramswaroop Kanya Higher Secondary School
- Govt. Primary School
- Divine Light School (English Medium)
- Vinayak Public School (English Medium)

Poonchh village is a center for education for more than 14 villages around it and it also have numerous coaching classes for school academics and government job exam preparation.

== Economic ==
Poonchh village is also a center of economic activities for more than 14 villages around it. It has well established market places, automobile service centers, restaurants and highway dhaba, Govt. hospital, private clinics, agriculture produce procurement center (Galla Mandi), Punjab National Bank and ATM, Indian Post Office, and Co-operative Bank.

== Notable people ==
As per constitution of India and Panchyati Raaj Act (Amendment 1998), Poonchh village is administered by the Pradhan (Head of Village) who is an elected representative of the village. Currently, Lakhan Yadav is the elected Pradhan (Head of Village); he succeeded Meera w/o Ramkumar Yadav in April 2021.

Poonchh represents in Jila Panchayat members election as ward 1 in Jhansi district, which has a total of 24 wards. It consists of a total of 22 villages (Gram Sabha) with the total 44,708 voters. Currently, Balkishun Barar has won the Jila Panchayat member election with the support of Bhartiya Janta Party in a close contest with independent candidate Yadvendra Singh supported by Kishan Singh and Samajwadis in April 2021. In total, 13 candidates contested the jila panchayat member election and only 2 candidates (Balkishun Barar and Yadvendra Singh) were able to secure their deposits. Rest 11 candidates lost their deposits.
