= Global NCAP =

Vehicle safety consumer test

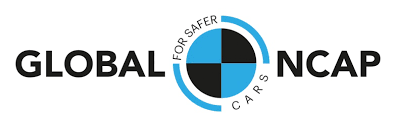
Global NCAP logo, 2017 revision

Global New Car Assessment Programme (Global NCAP) is a UK-registered charity that serves as an umbrella organisation encouraging co-operation between the various New Car Assessment Programmes around the world, and a consumer test for vehicle safety in markets that are weakly regulated or do not yet have their own consumer safety programmes.

== Campaigns ==
=== Safer Cars for India ===
In January 2014, Global NCAP released the first ever independent crash test results of five popular compact cars sold in the Indian market, starting their popular 'Safer Cars for India' project. The assessment was based on 2013 Latin NCAP assessment protocol for adult occupant protection and 2010 Latin NCAP assessment protocol for child occupant protection. The five cars tested did not have frontal airbags and showed varying degrees of collapse of the passenger cell, and were awarded zero stars for adult occupant protection because injury measures from important body parts of the crash test dummies recorded unacceptably high risks of serious, severe or critical injury. Four of the five cars tested were also deemed to have failed the ECE R94 frontal impact standard used for homogation in the EU.

The first phase of results gained international media attention, prompting manufacturers like Toyota and Volkswagen to make frontal airbags standard fitment across their Indian fleets.

Global NCAP has since continued to publish results under the project. The combination of Indian legislation for the fitment of frontal airbags and the enforcement of UN-equivalent front and side impact standards for the homologation of new models from 2017 and existing models from October 2019 has resulted in Indian cars showing lower fascia-level intrusion in the test, but the standards lack characteristics of consumer tests like the protection of less important body parts like the feet, or the modification of results for poor robustness, and results of Global NCAP's frontal offset consumer-test remain mixed.

In October 2023, the Indian Ministry of Road Transport and Highways started Bharat NCAP, a local consumer-test programme for vehicle safety based on the assessment protocols of Global NCAP's Safer Cars for India project. Global NCAP announced that funded testing under the Safer Cars for India project would come to an end following the announcement of results during their 2024 World Congress on 23 April 2024. Automakers would still be allowed to submit vehicles for testing at their own expense.

=== Safer Cars for Africa ===
Global NCAP and the Automobile Association of South Africa started the Safer Cars for Africa project in November 2017 using the same assessment protocols as the Safer Cars for India project. Five popular compact cars were crash-tested in the first round, followed by the inclusion of pickup trucks from the second round and fleet models from the third.

In early 2020, Global NCAP conducted a car-to-car test between the South African Nissan NP300 Hardbody and a second-hand Nissan Navara from Europe. The second-hand European car was fitted with multiple airbags and Electronic Stability Control, and its passenger compartment maintained its integrity far better than the African car did. Nissan South Africa confirmed in early 2021 that production and sale of the NP300 in South Africa would come to an end.

Global NCAP have expressed their intention to prioritise Safer Cars for Africa in 2025, with the organisation's 2024 accounts stating: "With the activation and development of Bharat NCAP in 2024, the focus of our advocacy efforts will shift from India to Africa next year", and that "In 2025, Global NCAP will continue to [...] undertake further rounds of testing for the Safer Cars for Africa project."

== Test criteria ==
=== Emerging market assessment protocol ===
Global NCAP awards star ratings based an assessment protocol designed for emerging markets. These criteria are periodically made more demanding, usually by the inclusion of additional areas of assessment.

Initial results for Safer Cars for India were based on the assessment criteria used by Latin NCAP in 2013.

In 2017, Global NCAP began using Q-Series child dummies in dynamic tests, replacing the earlier P-Series.

In July 2022, the assessment criteria were updated to include side impact protection and seatbelt reminders for the rear seats in the score, and pedestrian protection, optional electronic stability control, and optional side head protection airbags as qualifying requirements for higher star ratings.

In August 2025, the assessment protocols were updated, only allowing safety equipment to be rewarded if fitted as standard, and providing for manufacturers to submit type approval certificates for some tests instead of official testing. A moose test was added for consumer information, but this would not be part of the scoring.

=== Safer Choice award ===
Global NCAP's Safer Choice Award, originally part of the Safer Cars for India and Safer Cars for Africa campaigns independently, was introduced to recognise vehicles offering advanced safety technologies beyond the scope of the star ratings. When the award was first introduced in 2018, it was available to five-star vehicles that additionally demonstrated UNECE-compliant pedestrian protection performance and offered electronic stability control at least as an option in sufficient volumes.

These became part of the basic assessment protocol for cars in 2022, and the Safer Choice protocol was updated in 2024 to also require optional speed limitation, blind spot detection and automatic emergency braking in sufficient volumes. Additionally, the award was opened to vehicles in emerging markets outside India and Africa that are not covered by a New Car Assessment Programme.

== Comparison groups ==
The results are grouped into 4 increasingly demanding classes:

- 2014 – June 2022 (based on Latin NCAP 2013)
- July 2022 – July 2025 (similar to Bharat NCAP 2022, based on Latin NCAP 2016)
- August 2025 – 2029 (based on Latin NCAP 2019)
- 2030 onward

== Criticism ==
Since the start of its Safer Cars for India project, Global NCAP has faced criticism similar to that faced by other NCAP programs in their early phases.

After publication of the second round of results for the project, long-time admirer of the Datsun GO, Bertel Schmitt, published an article in The Daily Kanban accusing the FIA of having vested interests in starting the project. He accused Global NCAP of having double standards, questioning their use of a 64 km/h test while C-NCAP (a Global NCAP member) still used a 50 km/h test. It has since been noted that it is not possible to compare the two tests solely based on speed, because the 64 km/h test uses an offset deformable barrier, while the 50 km/h test is a full-width test into a rigid barrier, which is demanding on the vehicle's restraint systems.

The article also claimed that Global NCAP passed the basic version of the Ford Figo for the UN's Regulation 94 frontal crash test at 56 km/h 'claiming it would have performed better if it had airbags'. However, Global NCAP had, in fact, conducted a full-scale R94 test on that model where dummy readings passed minimum UN limits because of the dummy narrowly failing to make contact with the steering wheel.

After the first round of Safer Cars for India crash test results, Nissan executive Vice President, Dr Andy Palmer, said in a statement to Autocar, "I think the people who criticise these cars for not meeting US or European crash standards are living in a dream world."

In 2014, after the Maruti Suzuki Swift in its basic safety specification received a zero-star crash test rating, Maruti Suzuki's Chairman, R. C. Bhargava, defended the result claiming that vehicle safety was not part of the safe systems approach and that the road fatalities in India were in no way linked to poor safety of the cars on sale in the market.

Consumers have criticised Global NCAP for the limited nature of the tests which, until mid-2022, use 2013 Latin NCAP protocols which only cover offset frontal impact. Global NCAP confirmed in an interview that they are budget-constrained and would update their assessment protocols when it was possible. Since mid-2022, the protocol is based on Latin NCAP 2016 with some technology updates.

Consumers have raised doubts on the vehicle sponsorship procedure with worries that cars picked from early production before the market launch may not be representative of cars sold to consumers. Global NCAP confirmed with a note on their website that in case the cars are picked from early production, they are selected at random from the plant's distribution area (where cars are sent to dealers) and that the cars are hence representative of consumer cars.

It has also been pointed out on popular consumer forums that there have been ambiguities in the technical reports published for consumers to view.

Evidence suggests that the 64 km/h frontal offset crash used by Global NCAP, that represents a car-to-car crash, covers a lower fraction of car-related collisions in India than it does in Europe, because of the higher frequency of car crashes in India with more aggressive crash partners like commercial vehicles or rigid, fixed objects.

Although Indian ratings do not apply in South Africa and vice versa, Global NCAP has occasionally transferred test results between the countries to optimise testing costs, on occasion citing a "production compliance review". When Suzuki's Ertiga was selected for a 2024 Safer Cars for Africa test, some results from an older test on an Indian-market car were used, with then-parent charity Towards Zero Foundation's yearly financial report stating that "results from India and Africa can be potentially shared in this round of testing and thus optimising the results". This drew criticism from the Suzuki distributor in South Africa, who said in a media statement that "this nullifies the results and makes the report invalid".

In May 2026, Toyota South Africa issued a cease-and-desist letter to the Automobile Association of South Africa, Global NCAP's partner for Safer Cars for Africa, for testing a Toyota Starlet model without side and curtain airbags, which was "obsolete and not representative of the Starlet currently available in the South African market".
