= Latin NCAP =

Automobile safety assessment programme for Latin America and the Caribbean

Latin NCAP logo

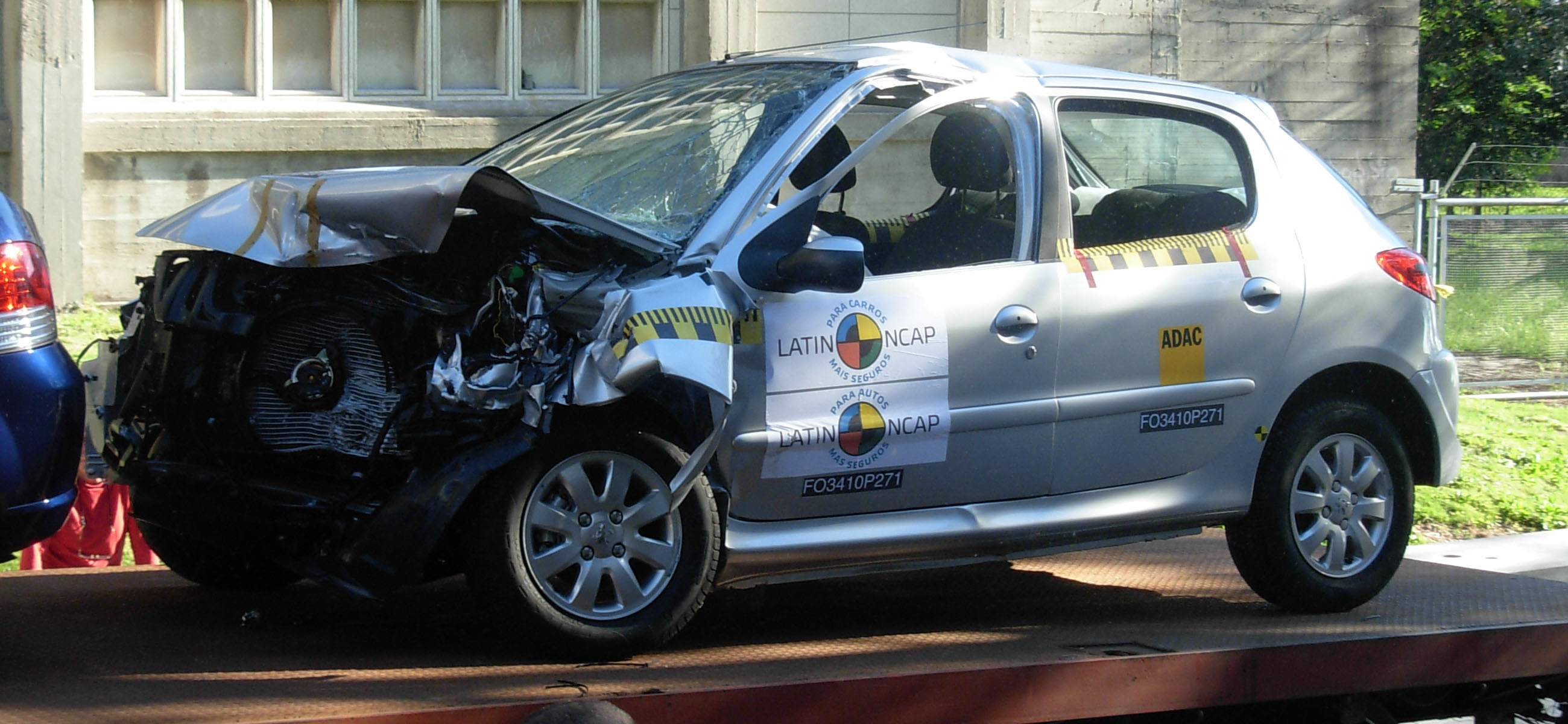
A Peugeot 207 Compact following a Latin NCAP frontal crash test at the Faculty of Engineering of the Universidad de la República in Montevideo, Uruguay.

Rank by vehicle sales in 2017	Country	Estimated road traffic death rate per 100,000 population, 2018
1	China	18.2
2	United States	12.4
3	Japan	4.1
4	India	22.6
5	Germany	4.1
6	United Kingdom	3.1
7	France	5.5
8	Brazil	19.7
9	Italy	5.6
10	Canada	5.8

The Latin New Car Assessment Programme (Latin NCAP) is an automobile safety assessment programme for Latin America and the Caribbean. Founded in 2010, it offers independent information to consumers about the safety levels of new cars in the market. Latin NCAP tests are based in international renowned methodologies, with vehicles awarded a safety rating between 0 and 5 stars, indicating the protection the cars offer to adult and child occupants. The programme started as a joint initiative and in 2014 it was established as an association under a legal entity framework.

== Rating ==
Latin NCAP started meeting and 2009 and its first frontal impact results were published in 2010. Ratings were assigned to adult (blue) and child (green) occupants on a scale of zero to five stars based on performance in a Euro NCAP 64 km/h frontal offset deformable barrier impact test.

The results showed that many popular compacts showed high risk of life-threatening injury because of structural failure and the lack of airbags. Many popular cars scored one star out of five, even some with airbags, like the JAC J3. The Geely CK was the worst performer, scoring no stars at all.

In 2013, the Latin NCAP adult occupant protection assessment protocols were updated. Capping was introduced, which meant that a car whose dummy readings indicated poor protection to a critical body region would lose all points for the test. Provisions were included for manufacturers to present knee mapping data to have penalties removed. A point was included in the assessment for having intelligent seatbelt reminders for the driver and front passenger. The requirements for the maximum five star rating were updated to include a basic ECE Regulation 95 side impact, anti-lock brakes, and scoring the complete available point for seatbelt reminders. This protocol, along with the 2010 child occupant protocol, was used by Latin NCAP's sister programme Global NCAP until early 2022.

In 2014, the child occupant protection evaluation was updated to use more modern Q-series dummies in the dynamic test and to include an installation check for the available child seats in the major markets. This resulted in some models being eligible for the maximum five star rating for child occupant protection.

2016 saw the first major update to Latin NCAP assessment protocols. Both star ratings were now made yellow. Besides minor changes to the frontal impact, adult protection would include a 50 km/h mobile deformable barrier side impact which would make up half of the scoring, and the available seatbelt reminder point would be split into two, one for the driver and front passenger and one for rear occupants. Additionally, scoring three stars required the full seatbelt reminder point for front occupants, in addition scoring four stars required a test and a high sales volume of electronic stability control, and five stars required standard fitment of a side head protection device for the driver and front passenger, and a pole test to verify its performance.

Child occupant protection would include a dynamic assessment in the side impact, credit for i-Size seating positions and greater importance to the presence of three-point belts in all seating positions.

2020 saw the combination of the adult and child protection rating into a single rating, determined by the worst performance out of four categories: adult occupant protection, child occupant protection, vulnerable road users and safety assist. Adult protection would include front and side impact and whiplash, and a pole test would be part of the scoring instead of a special requirement. Points would be awarded for urban automatic emergency braking systems. Vulnerable road user protection would include pedestrian impact tests including adult and child headforms and upper and lower legforms, and automatic emergency braking for pedestrians. Safety assist would include a number of safety assistance technologies including but not limited to seatbelt reminders, interurban automatic emergency braking, blind spot warnings and lane assistance. In addition to the old robotised R13H test for electronic stability control, a moose test with a trained driver would be included.

A full test takes about 2 weeks.

== Comparison groups ==
The results are grouped into 5 increasingly demanding classes:

- 2010-2015
- 2016-2019
- 2020-2025 (similar to Euro NCAP 2014)
- 2026-2029 (based on Euro NCAP 2019)
- 2030+

== Criticism ==
- Despite becoming increasingly more strict, it still has not reached the level of the latest Euro NCAP. It is now very close to the 2014 Euro NCAP protocol (sometimes above it).
- Unlike Euro NCAP, there are no professional vehicle ratings.
