= Avinya X =

Electric coupe SUV

Overview
- Manufacturer: Tata Motors Passenger Vehicles
- Model code: P2
- Production: 2027 (to commence)
- Assembly: China: Changshu (Chery Jaguar Land Rover); India: Panapakkam (Tata Motors Passenger Vehicles)

Body and chassis
- Body style: 5-door coupe SUV
- Platform: Chery E0X
- Related: Chery Fulwin T11; Exeed Sterra ET / EX7; Freelander 8; Luxeed R7

Powertrain
- Battery: 65–80 kWh NMC CATL

The Avinya X is an upcoming electric coupe SUV to be marketed in India by Tata Motors Passenger Vehicles under its upmarket electric car brand Avinya, using a platform from Chery Jaguar Land Rover's Freelander marque.

== History ==
On 2 November 2023, following the reveal of the Tata Avinya electric crossover SUV concept using Tata's Gen 3 architecture in April, Tata Motors announced that its electric vehicle subsidiary Tata Passenger Electric Mobility (TPEM) and British luxury carmaker Jaguar Land Rover (JLR), another Tata Motors subsidiary, signed a memorandum of understanding, where Tata would license JLR's upcoming Electrified Modular Architecture (EMA) platform for use in vehicles sold under the Avinya brand. A production version of the Avinya concept was originally expected to enter production by 2025.

On 18 January 2025, at Auto Expo, Tata unveiled a new concept called the Avinya X, built on JLR's EMA. Unlike the 2022 concept, it has a coupe SUV body style, and was expected to enter production in 2026. In June 2025, production at Tata's Sanand plant was delayed to 2027.

In June 2026, it was reported that Tata would license a platform developed by Chery for the Freelander 8, produced by Chery JLR in Changshu, China; Tata Technologies would localise the platform for the Indian market, while Tata Motors would assemble Avinya models from Chinese-made knock-down kits in a Panapakkam facility. Tata Motors confirmed the reports later that month. In July, Tata was reportedly testing an Exeed Sterra ET, built on the same E0X platform as the Freelander.

== Overview ==
The Avinya X, codenamed P2, will be the first Avinya model; it was previously slated to be a different model codenamed P1, that has since been put on hold.

=== Interior ===
In March 2025, Tata patented a two-spoke steering wheel for the vehicle. The dashboard was revealed through another design patent in June 2026. The minimalistic setup includes two stalks around the steering wheel, with one acting as the gear selector. There is a wide, sleek instrument cluster behind the wheel.

== Powertrain ==
The Avinya X's battery packs will reportedly be in the 65–80 kWh range, balancing range, weight and affordability. CATL, whose Freevoy NMC batteries are used in the Freelander 8, is also expected to supply battery packs for the Avinya X, though Tata's battery manufacturing business Agratas eventually plans to produce battery packs in-house.
