= Avinya =

Indian electric car brand

- Product type: Electric cars
- Current owner: Tata Motors Passenger Vehicles
- Produced by: Chery Jaguar Land Rover (manufacturing); Tata Motors Passenger Vehicles (CKD assembly)
- Country: India
- Introduced: Upcoming
- Related brands: Freelander
- Markets: India

Avinya is a brand of premium electric vehicles announced by Tata Motors Passenger Vehicles in 2023 for an upcoming launch in 2027, to be marketed and assembled in India by Tata using knock-down kits and a platform supplied by Chery.

== Etymology ==
The word Avinya, derived from the Sanskrit language, means 'innovation'.

== History ==
In November 2023, Tata Motors Passenger Vehicles (TMPV, then known as Tata Motors) announced that its electric vehicle subsidiary, Tata Passenger Electric Mobility (TPEM), and British luxury carmaker Jaguar Land Rover (JLR), another Tata Motors subsidiary, reached a memorandum of understanding for JLR to license its Electrified Modular Architecture (EMA) platform to TPEM for the development of battery electric vehicles sold under the Avinya brand, named after the Tata Avinya electric concept car unveiled in 2022, originally developed on Tata's Gen 3 architecture. Tata would pay JLR a royalty fee to use the EMA platform, but would localise it for India to reduce costs and speed up the research and development process. JLR was expected to supply the chassis, advanced electrical architectures, electric drive units and battery pack technology as part of the agreement.

Originally it was not specified if Avinya would exist as a standalone brand or as a sub-brand of Tata, but in January 2025, Tata Motors' head of global design, Martin Uhlarik, confirmed it would be separate to the main Tata brand, positioned above Tata and below Land Rover.

In June 2025, TPEM's chief commercial officer Vivek Srivatsa said Tata would launch the brand in 2027, delayed from 2026, after JLR delayed plans to jointly produce EVs in India with Tata on the EMA platform. Tata was considering other solutions, including developing a low-cost version of the architecture or sourcing architecture elsewhere.

On 3 June 2026, it was reported that Tata would license a platform originally developed by Chinese automaker Chery for the upcoming Freelander 8, produced at Chery and JLR's Chinese joint venture plant in Changshu. TMPV would work with Tata Technologies, another Tata Group subsidiary, to adapt the electronics, software and vehicle systems for the Indian market at Tata Technologies facilities in India, China and the UK. Tata would assemble Avinya models at a facility in Panapakkam, where JLR assembles the Range Rover Evoque, using knock-down kits produced in China by Chery. This was later confirmed by TMPV and TPEM managing director and CEO Shailesh Chandra at TMPV's investor day on 23 June.

== Products ==
=== Current models ===
- Avinya X, (2027, upcoming), SUV, BEV

=== Concept ===
- Avinya X concept (2025)
