= People's Car =

People's Car may refer to:

- Volkswagen (German for 'People's Car'), a German automotive manufacturer
- Volkswagen Beetle, the original production car that bore the Volkswagen ('People's Car') name
- Ford Model T, an American automotive manufacturer
- Citroën, a French automotive manufacturer
- Tata Nano, an Indian compact city car advertised as 'The People's Car'
