= Tata Nano =

Compact city car that was manufactured by Tata Motors

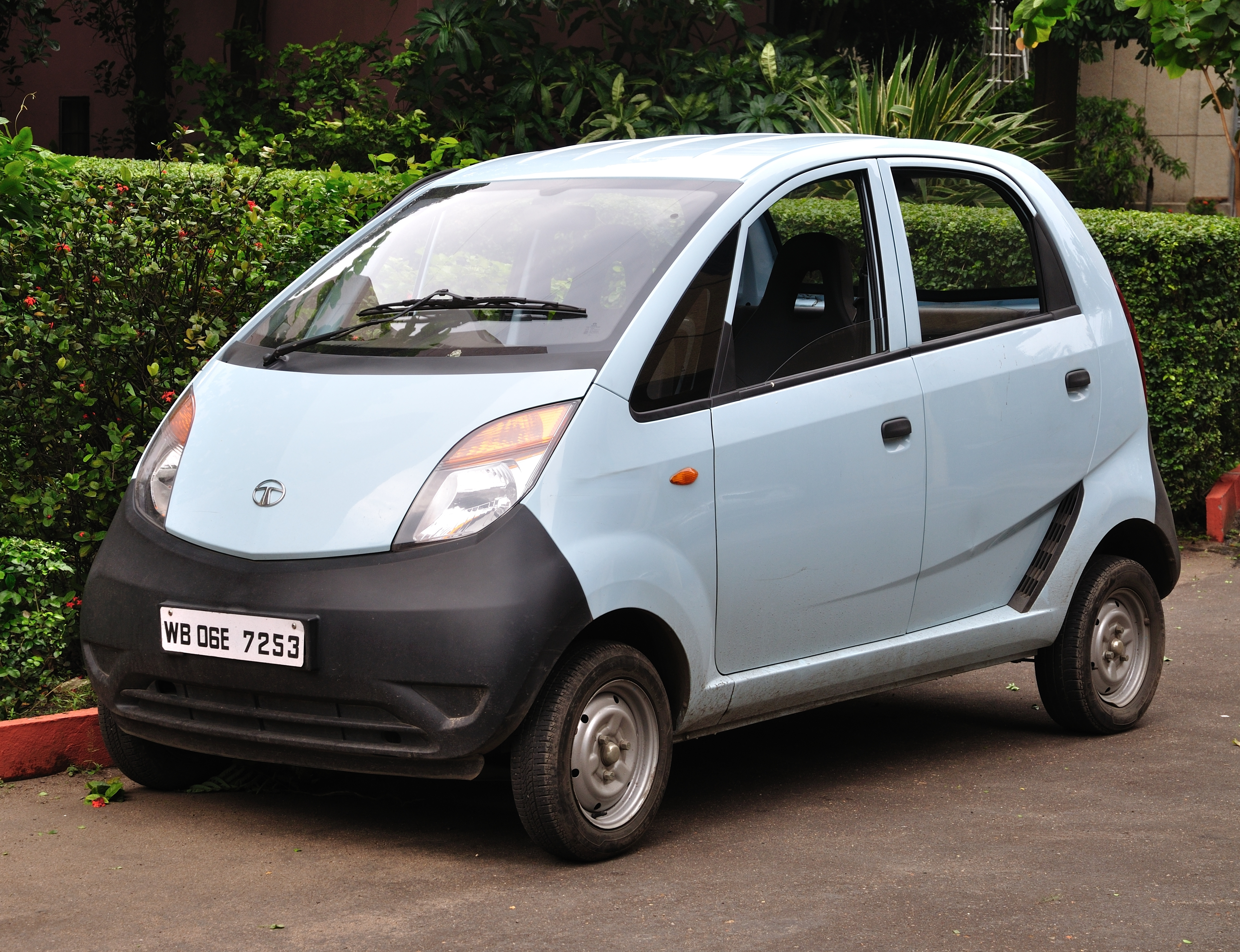

Overview
- Manufacturer: Tata Motors
- Also called: Tata GenX Nano (facelift 2015–2018)
- Production: 2008–2018
- Assembly: India: Gujarat, Sanand (Sanand Plant)
- Designer: Justyn Norek (I.DE.A Institute); Pierre Castinel (Tata Design Studio); Girish Wagh (Project Manager)

Body and chassis
- Class: City car
- Body style: 4-door saloon car 5-door hatchback (GenX Nano)
- Layout: Rear-engine, rear-wheel-drive
- Platform: Tata X3

Powertrain
- Engine: 624 cc I2 SOHC MPI petrol
- Transmission: 4-speed manual 5-speed AMT (2015+)

Dimensions
- Wheelbase: 2,230 mm (87.8 in)
- Length: 3,099 mm (122.0 in); 3,164 mm (124.6 in) (GenX Nano)
- Width: 1,390 mm (54.7 in)
- Height: 1,652 mm (65.0 in)
- Curb weight: 600–635 kg (1,323–1,400 lb)

The Tata Nano is a city car/microcar manufactured and marketed by Indian automaker Tata Motors from 2008 to 2018. It was primarily sold in India as an inexpensive economy car for motorcycle and scooter riders — with a launch price of ₹100,000 (US$2,500) on 10 January 2008. The Nano has a rear-engine, rear-wheel-drive layout and was initially produced as a four-door saloon car with no rear cargo opening, with a five-door hatchback version introduced in 2015.

Tata Motors projected production figures of 250,000 annually at launch. This was not achieved, and various factors led to a decline in sales volume, including delays during the factory relocation from Singur to Sanand, early instances of the Nano catching fire and the perception that the Nano was unsafe and lacked quality from its aggressive cost cutting. Actual sales reached 7,591 for model year 2016-2017. The project lost money, as confirmed by former Tata Sons chairman Cyrus Mistry and by 2017 Tata Motors management.

In 2017, Tata Motors said manufacturing would continue due to the company's emotional commitment to the project. Production was eventually halted in May 2018. The Sanand Plant subsequently manufactured other hatchbacks, including the Tiago and Tigor.

== History ==
After successfully launching the low cost Tata Ace truck in 2005, Tata Motors began development of an affordable passenger car that would appeal to the many Indians who ride motorcycles. The purchase price of this no frills auto was brought down by dispensing with most nonessential features, reducing the amount of steel used in its construction, and relying on low cost Indian labour.. The design featured only a driver's side wing mirror, one wiper blade, only three lug nuts per wheel and a fuel tank without filler cap. Tata said it was the first time a 2-cylinder petrol engine was being used in a car with single balancer shaft.

At introduction, the Nano received attention due to its low price of 1 lakh rupees (Rs. 100,000). Some promotional material labeled the vehicle as "The People’s Car".

=== Expectations and effects ===
Expectations created for the car during the run up to its production were out of proportion with realised sales. A 2008 study by Indian rating agency CRISIL projected the Nano would expand the nation's car market by 65%, but, as of late 2012, news reports have detailed the underwhelming response of the Indian consumer to the offering; sales in the first two fiscal years after the car's unveiling remained steady at about 70,000 units. Tata intended to maintain a capacity to produce the car in much larger quantities, some 250,000 per year, should the need arise.

It was anticipated that its 2009 debut would greatly affect the used car market, and prices did drop 25–30% prior to the launch. Sales of the Nano's nearest competitor, the Maruti 800, fell by 20% immediately following the unveiling of the Nano. It is unknown if the Nano has had a lasting effect on the prices of and demand for close substitutes. In July 2012, Tata's Group chairman Ratan Tata, who retired in same year, said that the car had immense potential in the developing world while admitting that early opportunities were wasted due to initial problems. Due to the sales drops, only a single unit was produced in June 2018. The Sanand Plant now produces other hatchbacks like Tiago and Tigor.

=== Singur factory pullout ===
Tata Motors announced in 2006 that the Nano would be manufactured in Singur, West Bengal. Local farmers soon began protesting the 'supposed' forced acquisition of their land the new factory entailed. Tata first delayed the Nano launch and later decided to build the car in a different state, Gujarat, instead.

== Price ==
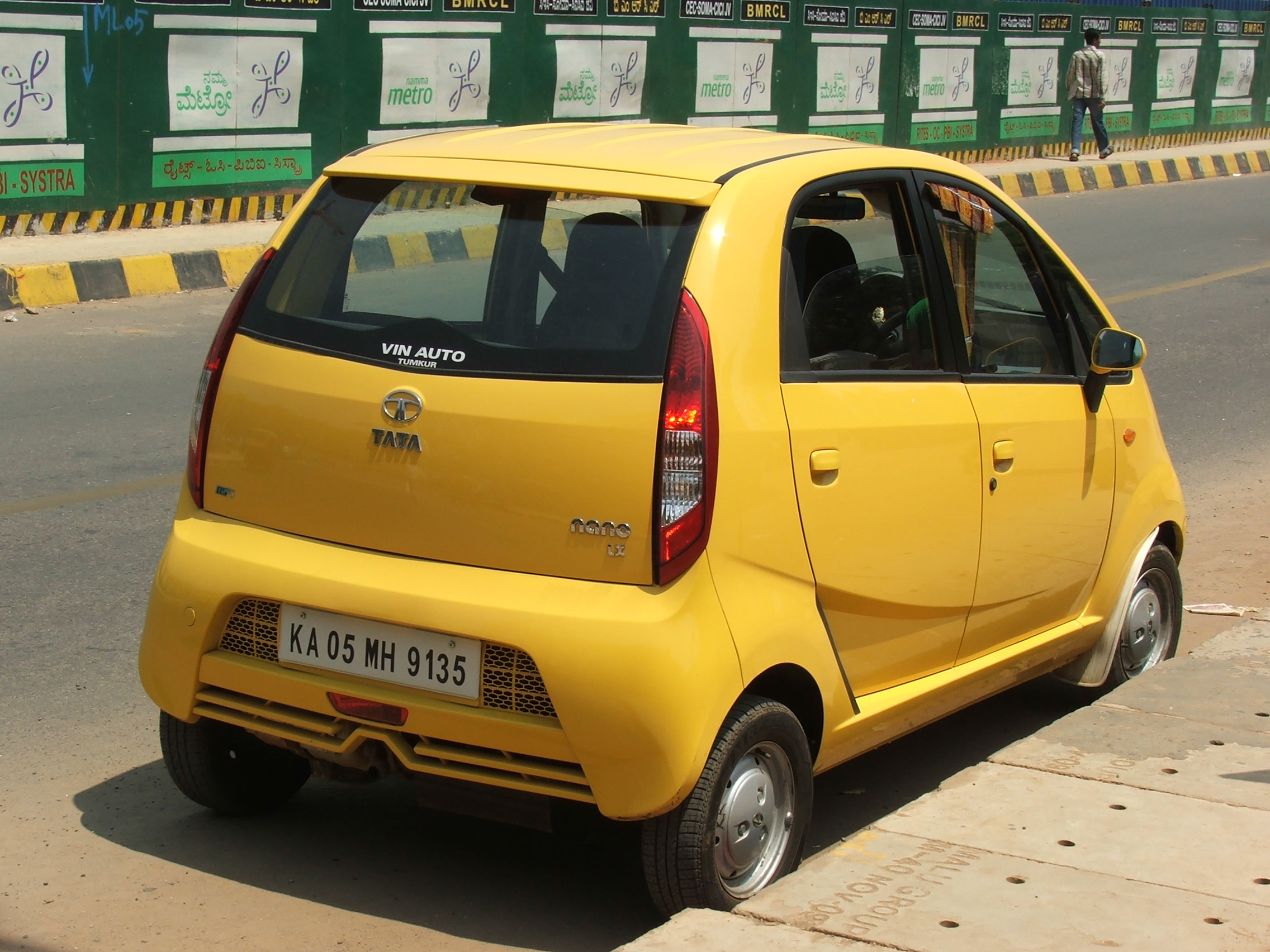
Rear

Announced as the lowest priced production car in the world, Tata aimed for a price of one lakh rupees, or ₹100,000, which was approximately $2,000 US at launch time. Only the very first customers were able to purchase the car at that price, and as of 2017, the price for the basic Nano started around ₹ 215,000 ($3,400 US). Increasing material costs may be to blame for this rapid rise in price.

Compared to the Volkswagen Beetle it had a relatively low price, though still high in terms of the average salary of an Indian industrial worker or farmer. In 1990, a Beetle from Mexican factories was priced at $5,300, about $13,061 in 2022. The Ford Model T's initial price was about $850, equivalent to $30,458 in 2022. The price of the Nano was only just higher than the corrected price of the Briggs & Stratton Flyer of the 1910s, with the Flyer costing US$125 ($1,767 in 2016), while the Flyer might be classified as more of a go-kart than a car.

=== Cost-cutting features ===
The Nano's design implements many measures to reduce manufacturing costs.

Tata Nano
The trunk was only initially accessible from inside, as the rearmost panel did not open. (full hatchback offered in 2015).
One windscreen wiper instead of the usual pair
No base power steering due to light weight. Added in higher variants in later models.
Three lug nuts per wheel
Driver side wing mirror on base model. Higher variants fitted with passenger side ORVM from 2012 onwards.
1DIN Radio CD player
No airbags on any model
624cc rear engine, 2 cylinders (312cc each)
Front and rear drum brakes.
No air conditioning in base model
Front passenger seat same as the driver seat and the head restraints are integrated.
Thinner 135/70R12 space saver spare tyre.
No external fuel filler cap. Fuel inlet is accessed by opening the front hood.
Front power windows only offered on highest variant. PW switches placed on central console rather than on door pads.

== Technical specifications ==
The Nano (2012) was a 38 PS (28 kW; 37 hp) car with a two-cylinder 624 cc engine mounted in the rear of the car. The car complied with Bharat Stage 4 Indian Emissions Standards, which are roughly equivalent to Euro 4.

The development of the Nano led to 31 design and 37 technology patents being filed.

| Engine: | 2 cylinder petrol with Bosch multi-point fuel injection (single injector) all aluminium 38 metric horsepower (28 kW) 624 cc (38 cu in) |
| Engine: | Bosch Motronic ECU (engine control unit) |
| Engine: | 2 valves per cylinder overhead camshaft |
| Engine: | Compression ratio: 9.5:1 |
| Engine: | bore × stroke: 73.5 mm (2.9 in) × 73.5 mm (2.9 in) |
| Engine: | Power: 38 PS (28 kW; 37 hp) @ 5500 +/-500 rpm |
| Engine: | Torque: 51 N⋅m (38 ft⋅lbf) @ 3000 +/-500 rpm |
| Layout and Transmission | Rear wheel drive |
| Layout and Transmission | 4-speed manual transmission |
| Layout and Transmission | Option:Automated manual transmission |
| Steering | mechanical rack and pinion w/o servo |
| Steering | Turning radius: 4 metres |
| Performance | Acceleration: 0-60 km/h (37 mph): 10 seconds 0-100 km/h (62 mph): 30 seconds |
| Performance | Maximum speed: 105 km/h (65 mph) |
| Performance | Fuel efficiency (overall): 25.35 kilometres per litre (4.24 litres per 100 kilometres (66.6 mpg_{‑imp}; 55.5 mpg_{‑US})) |
| Body and dimensions | Seat belt: 4 |
| Body and dimensions | Trunk capacity: 94 L (3.3 cu ft) |
| Suspension, Tires & Brakes | Front brake: 180 mm Drum |
| Suspension, Tires & Brakes | Rear brake: 180 mm Drum |
| Suspension, Tires & Brakes | Front track: 1,325 mm (52.2 in) |
| Suspension, Tires & Brakes | Rear track: 1,315 mm (51.8 in) |
| Suspension, Tires & Brakes | Ground clearance: 180 mm (7.1 in) |
| Suspension, Tires & Brakes | Front suspension: MacPherson strut with lower A-arm |
| Suspension, Tires & Brakes | Rear suspension: Trailing arms with coil spring |
| Suspension, Tires & Brakes | 12-inch wheels |

| Supplier | Part/system |
|---|---|
| Texspin | Clutch Bearings |
| Bosch | Oxygen sensor, Gasoline injection system (diesel will follow), starter, alternator, brake system |
| Continental AG | Gasoline fuel supply system, fuel level sensor |
| Caparo | Inner structural panels |
| HSI AUTO | Static sealing systems (Weather Strips) |
| Delphi | Instrument cluster |
| Rane Madras Limited | Steering Assembly |
| Denso | Windshield wiper system (single motor and arm) |
| FAG Kugelfischer | Rear-wheel bearing |
| Federal-Mogul | Pistons, Piston rings, Spark plugs, Gaskets, Systems protection |
| Ficosa | Rear-view mirrors, interior mirrors, manual and CVT shifters, washer system |
| Freudenberg | Engine sealing |
| GKN | Driveshafts |
| INA | Shifting elements |
| ITW Deltar | Outside and inside door handles |
| Johnson Controls | Seating |
| Mahle | Camshafts, spin-on oil filters, fuel filters and air cleaners |
| Saint-Gobain | Glass |
| TRW | Brake system |
| Ceekay Daikin/Valeo | Clutch sets |
| Vibracoustic | Engine mounts |
| Visteon | Air induction system |
| ZF Friedrichshafen AG | Chassis components, including tie rods |
| Behr | HVAC for the luxury version |
| Dürr | Lean Paint Shop |

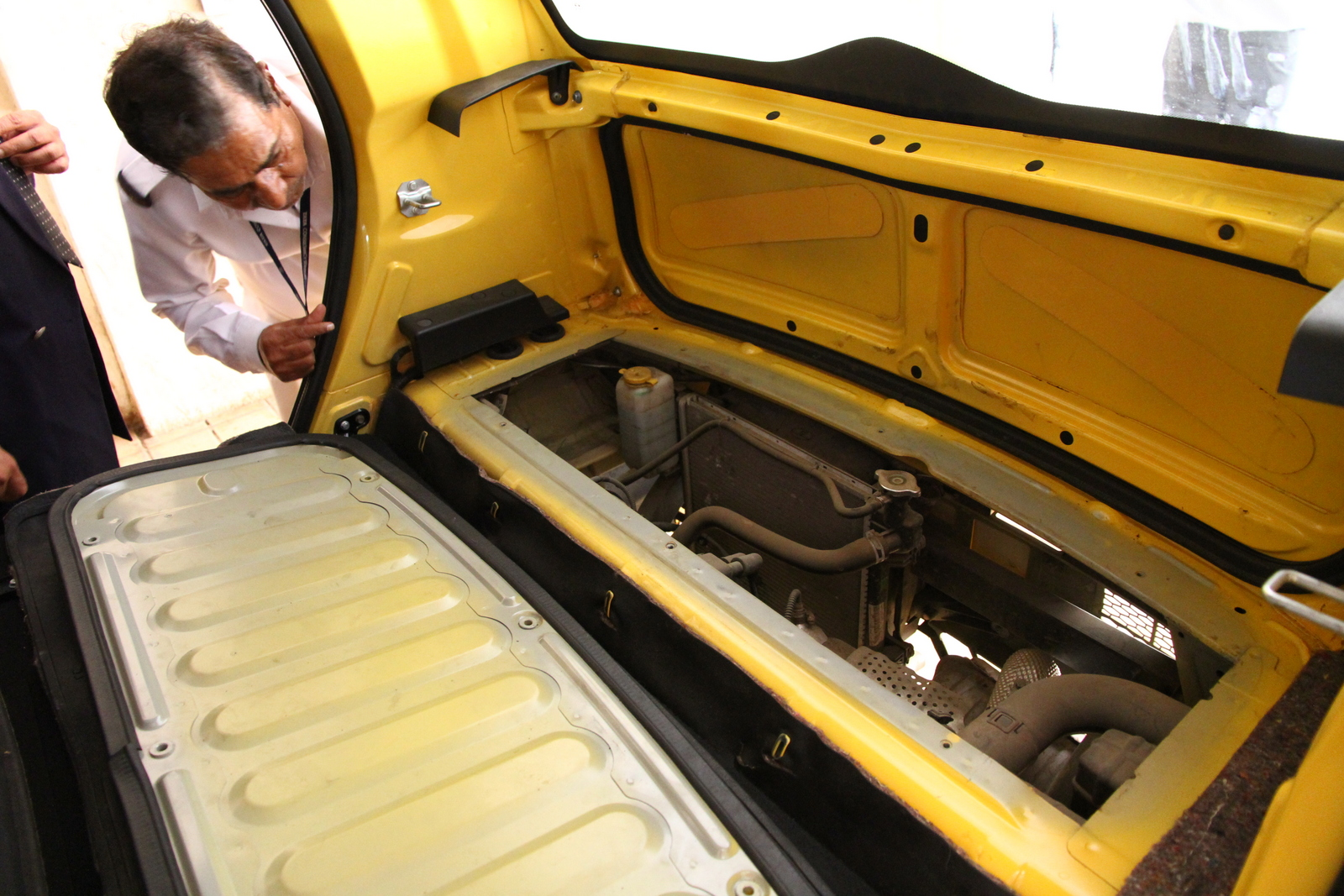
Tata Nano engine in trunk that is only accessible from inside as a cost reduction feature

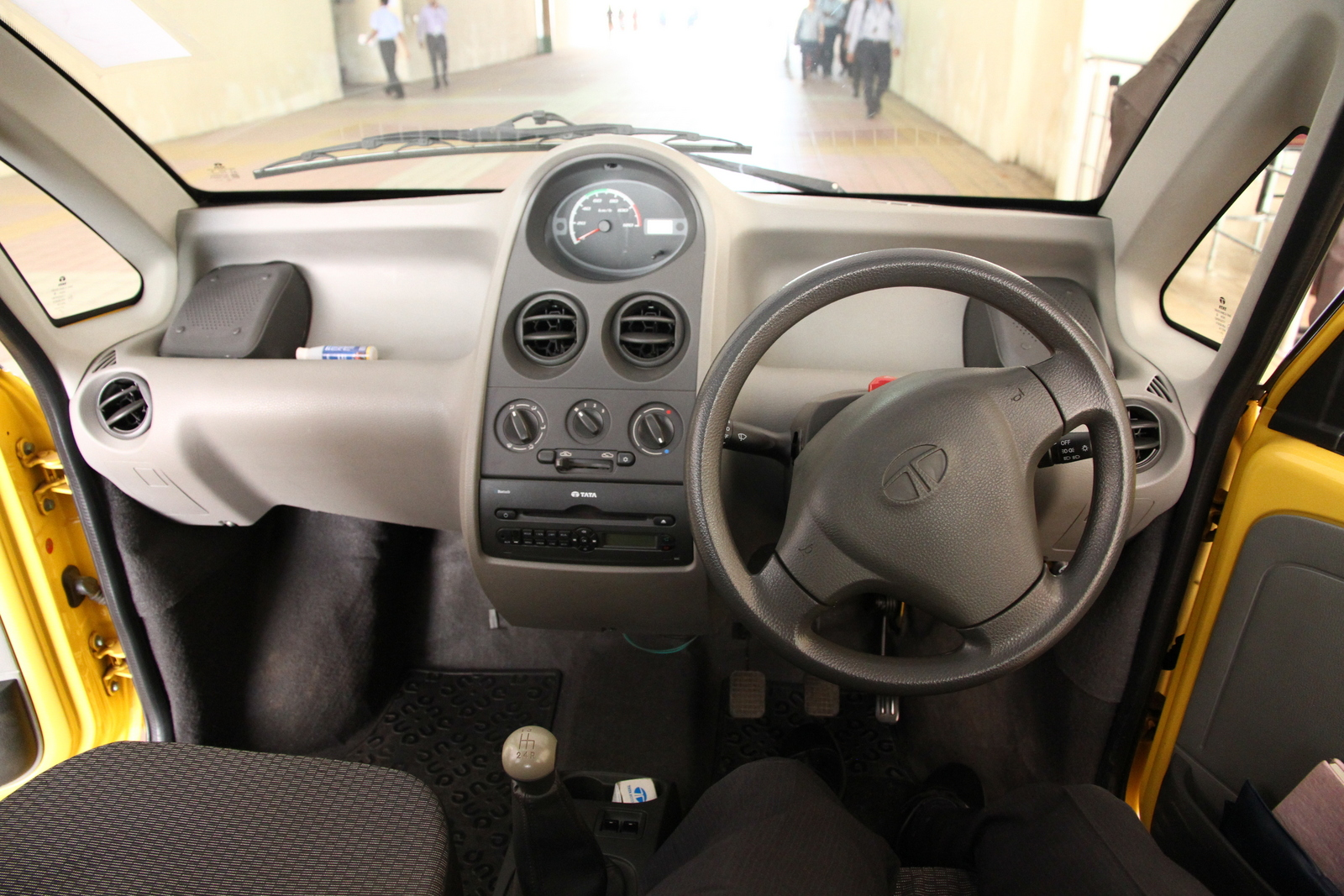
The Tata Nano's dashboard is very simple.

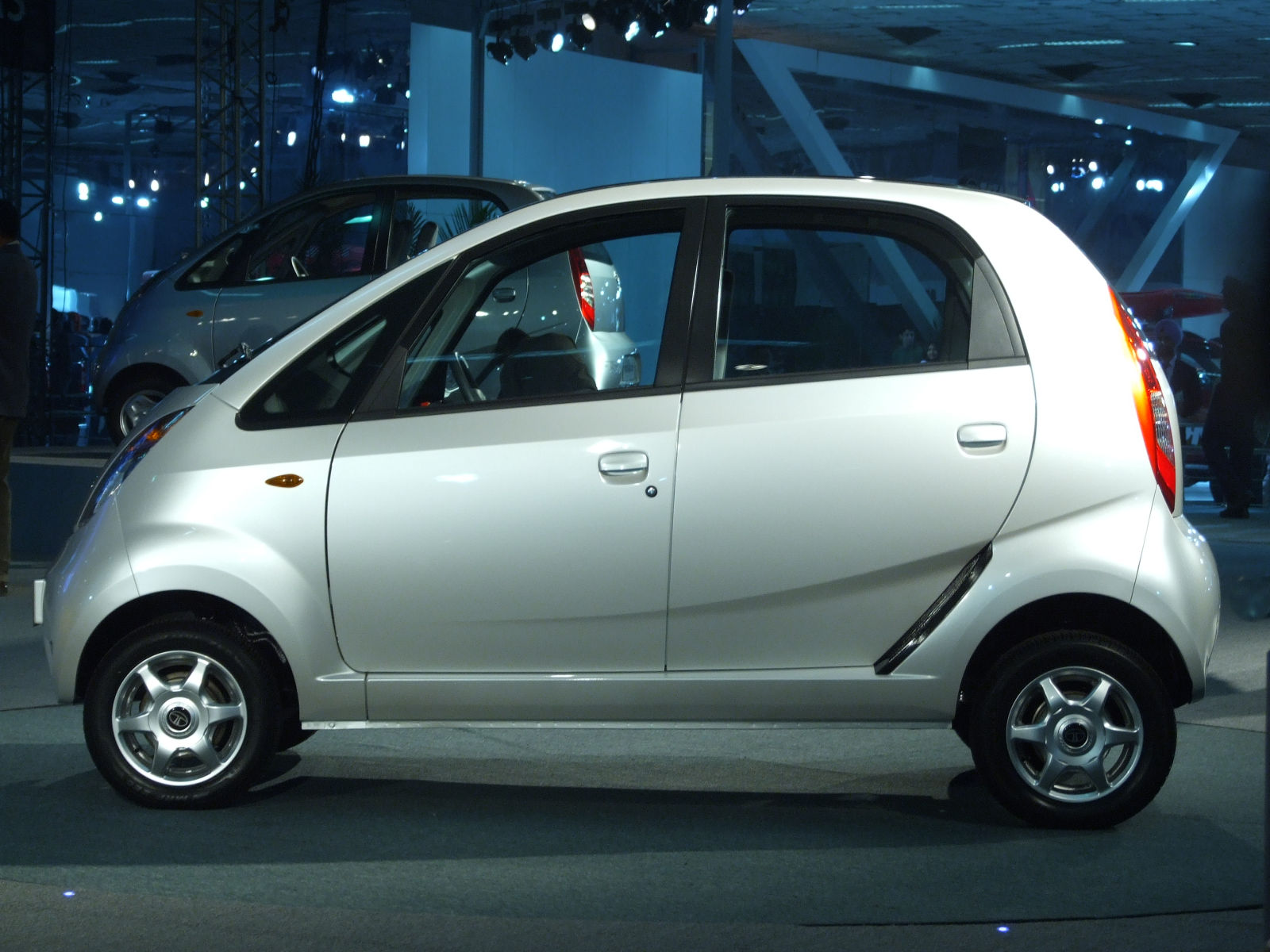
The car's exterior and interiors were designed at Italy's Institute of Development in Automotive Engineering.

== Tata GenX Nano (2015–2018) ==
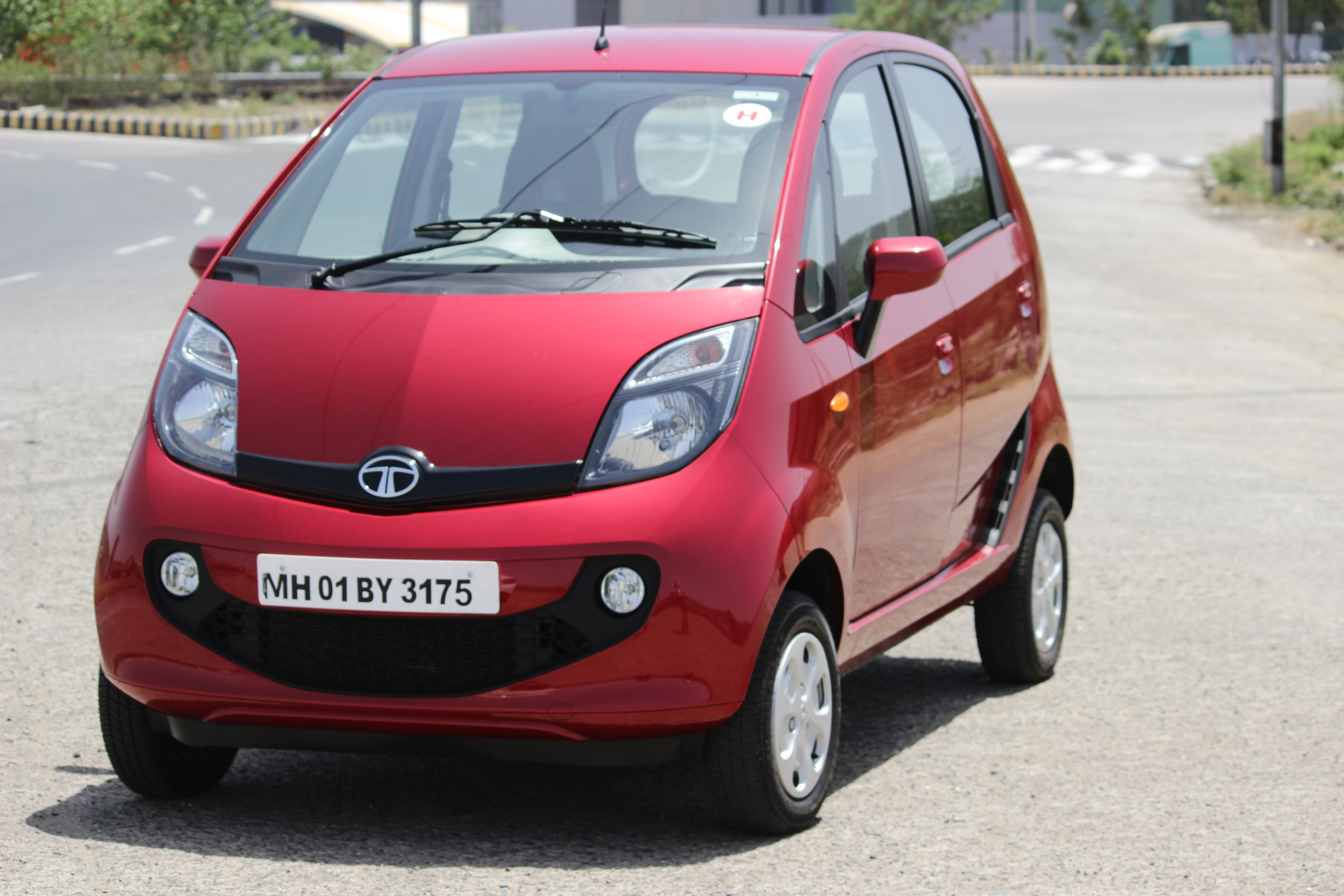
2015 Tata GenX Nano (facelift)

In May 2015, to revive the model's sales, Tata Motors introduced a series of enhancements both inside and outside the car. The name was changed to GenX Nano to underline the changes, the range was offered in 21 different versions, among them a 5-speed automated manual transmission. Electric power steering, air conditioning, and Bluetooth radio were available on top models in addition to new colors and alloy wheels. The body was strengthened and the front and rear bumpers were changed, which slightly increased the length to 3,164 millimeters. The interior was also redesigned with new fabrics and improved soundproofing. The rear hatchback and 5-seat homologation were introduced. The engine remained the 2-cylinder 624 cc (38.1 cu in) with 38 hp.

== Alternative power plants ==
The Nano was driven by a petrol engine. Though several variants were proposed, none were put into production. An upscale version was shown at an auto show.

=== Compressed-air engine ===
Tata Motors signed an agreement in 2007 with a French firm, Motor Development International, to produce a compressed air car Nano. While the vehicle was supposed to be able to travel approximately 200 kilometres (120 mi) on $3 US of electricity to compress the air, Tata's Vice-President of Engineering Systems confirmed in late 2009 that vehicle range continued to be a problem.

=== Electric vehicle ===
Tata discussed the possibility of producing an electric version, and while it showcased an electric vehicle Nano at the 2010 Geneva Motor Show, no such car came onto the market.

If an EV Nano had been produced the expectations were that it would have been a highly affordable electric car using lithium-ion batteries and having a range of 80 miles (130 km). A Norwegian electric car specialist, Miljøbil Grenland AS, was named as a proposed partner in the project.

There was, however, an electric version of the Nano released for fleet operators like Ola by Jayem Automotives which was called the Jayem Neo EV, launched in 2020. It was discontinued in 2019-2020 and only 400 were made.

=== Tata Nano CNG emax (Bi-fuel) ===
The Nano CNG emax was launched in October 2013. It could run on either gasoline or compressed natural gas. Initially, it was to be sold in Delhi and parts of Maharashtra and Lucknow, where CNG was available at fuel outlets. The bifuel engine was powered by both CNG and petrol. In natural gas operation, the engine delivered maximum power of 33 horsepower and 45 Nm of maximum torque. The tank had a capacity of 32 liters (8 US Gal/7 UK Gal) of CNG.

=== Tata Super Nano ===
In December 2014, Coimbatore-based JA Motorsport presented a 230 hp 1.3-liter engined version of the Nano called the 'Super Nano' at the Autocar Performance Show. Featuring a full body kit, slick tyres, a bolt-on roll cage, and smoked head and tail lamps, the Super Nano featured carbon fibre components, Recaro seats, and steering-mounted paddle shifters.

== European export ==
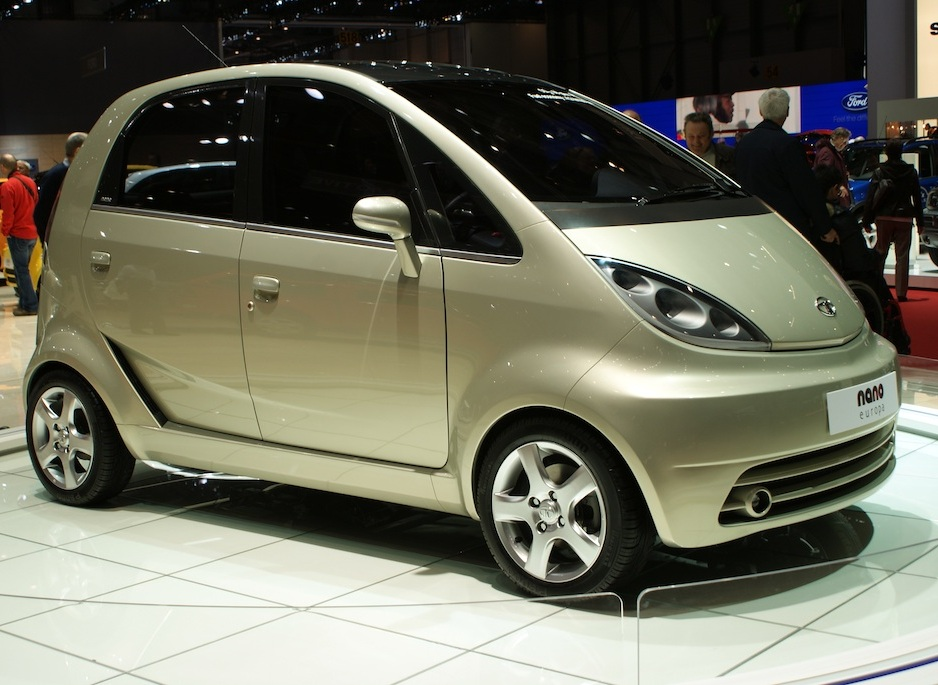
The Tata Nano Europa concept car

An upscale Nano concept car called Nano Europa was shown at the 2009 Geneva Motor Show. However, there was no progress towards producing or marketing this upscale specification.

== Car fires ==
There were reports of several fire incidents involving the Nano. The company denied those were connected to the car's design or its parts and blamed "foreign electrical equipment" found on top of the exhaust system. The company offered to retrofit the exhaust and electrical systems but refused to recall the cars. Tata extended the warranty on the car, including those already sold, from 18 months to four years in early December 2010.

== Reception ==
The Nano received a mixed reception from Indian consumers; reasons given included that it was still too expensive compared to a motorcycle, and the extended waiting time for delivery (a few months). Although it was identified as the most affordable car, a more expensive secondhand car signaled higher social status; the Nano was considered a "poor man's" vehicle, turning some customers away. The fires and other safety issues were also a concern.

Tata Motors ended FY16 selling 21,012 Nanos, up from 16,901 in FY15.

=== Safety ===
Global NCAP 1.0 test results (India) Tata Nano – No Airbags (2014, similar to Latin NCAP 2013)
| Test | Score | Stars |
|---|---|---|
| Adult occupant protection | 0.00/17.00 | 0.00 /5 stars |
| Child occupant protection | 0.00/49.00 | 0.00 /5 stars |

In 2014, Global NCAP 1.0 crash-tested an Indian-market Tata Nano at the ADAC facility in Germany in its pilot round of 64km/h front offset deformable barrier crash tests for its Safer Cars for India project (based on Latin NCAP 2013). They also crashed the Nano in the configuration for the UN's R94 test. Tata had made it public that a version of the Nano designed for export to Europe had passed R94, and they were also expecting a four star Euro NCAP result. In contrast, the Indian car failed the R94 test and scored zero stars for adult and child occupant protection in Global NCAP's tests. The Nano was not fitted with airbags, not even one for the driver, nor ABS. During the 64km/h NCAP test the passenger compartment not only became unstable but also showed extremely high levels of intrusion of the steering column and waist-level intrusion of the A-pillar, showing high risk of life-threatening injury to the driver's head, neck and chest and also indicating that less critical body regions like the knees, tibias and feet were unlikely to be recoverable. The Nano had only static two-point seatbelts for the rear seats and no child seat available for sale in India could pass the installation check, meaning that the Nano was unsuitable for safely transporting children. It achieved zero stars for child occupant protection, scoring no points in all areas of assessment.

== Sales ==
At the time of launch Tata Motors planned to sell 250,000 units per year. The maximum sales ever achieved was 74,527 units during FY 2011-2012 and then sales declined rapidly year after year leading to a negligible market share of the car in the "A" segment. The product was expected to be phased out soon as dealers stopped placing orders.

FY 2009–2010 30,000 approx

FY 2010–2011 70,432

FY 2011–2012 74,527

FY 2012–2013 53,848

FY 2013–2014 21,129

FY 2014–2015 16,903

FY 2016-2017 7,591

FY 2017-2018 April - October 1,502

== End of production ==
Due to the low sales of the model (only one Nano was assembled in June 2018 against the 275 assembled in June 2017) Tata Motors announced the end of production without any direct successor. The Nano was not accepted by potential buyers and sales were always lower than projected. The Sanand Plant now produces other hatchbacks like the Tiago and the Tigor.

== Awards ==
- 2010 Business Standard Motoring Indian car of the year
- 2010 Bloomberg UTV-Autocar car of the year
- 2010 Edison Awards, first place in the transportation category
- 2010 Good Design Awards, in the category of transportation
- 2014 India's Most Trusted hatchback car, according to The Brand Trust Report 2014 edition

== In the media ==
- Small Wonder: The Making of Nano–a book about the creation of the Tata Nano
- A Megafactories episode on this vehicle
- From Bollywood to Hollywood in Jay Leno's garage. YouTube channel.
- Das Billigste Auto der Welt - Tata Nano. YouTube channel.

== See also ==
- Tata Pixel
- Singur Tata Nano controversy
- City car
- Tata Ace
- Tata Magic Iris
- Bajaj RE60
- Fiat 126
- Kei car
