= Girish Wagh =

Indian engineer

Girish Wagh is currently the executive director of Tata Motors. He was previously leading the Commercial Vehicle Business Unit at Tata Motors. He earlier worked in the capacity of Sr. Vice President(Tata Small & Passenger Car Segment) & Head Project Planning and Program Management of Tata Motors. He is a key figure in the Tata Nano's project.

A mechanical engineer from the Maharashtra Institute of Technology, Wagh did a post-graduate programme in manufacturing from Mumbai B-school SP Jain Institute of Management and Research. At Tata Motors, he previously designed the Tata Ace mini truck. He is a native of Pune.
