= Tata Pixel =

Rear-engined four-passenger city car manufactured by Tata Motors

Overview
- Manufacturer: Tata Motors

Body and chassis
- Class: City car (A)
- Body style: 3-door hatchback
- Layout: RR layout
- Doors: Scissor

Powertrain
- Engine: 1.2L I3
- Transmission: CVT toroidal traction-drive

Dimensions
- Wheelbase: 2,230 mm (87.8 in)
- Length: 3,099 mm (122.0 in)
- Width: 1,495 mm (58.9 in)
- Height: 1,652 mm (65.0 in)
- Kerb weight: 600 kg (1,300 lb)–635 kg (1,400 lb)

The Tata Pixel was a concept rear-engined four-passenger city car, unveiled on 1 March 2011 by Tata Motors at the 81st International Motor Show in Geneva. Aimed primarily at the European market, it was primarily based on the Tata Nano platform.

== History ==
The Tata Pixel is based upon the Nano Europa concept which was first shown at the 2009 Geneva Motor Show. Complying to the Europa concept, Nano was upgraded to meet EU safety and emission standards. The concept had undergone a series of improvements over the standard Nano, including an extended wheelbase, a new 3-cylinder engine, power steering, an anti-lock braking system (ABS), an improved interior and exterior and it was also heavier than the standard Nano.

== Features ==
The Tata Pixel concept includes the following features

=== Zero Turn Drive ===
The Tata Pixel is able to maneuver and can be parked in tight spaces due to the zero turn toroidal traction-drive, infinitely variable transmission (IVT), and due to its steering system design. This results in a turning circle radius of 2.6 meters. The steering and the transmission work together so that each wheel is driven independently with inputs from the steering system. By applying reverse drive on a single rear wheel and forward drive on a single front wheel, the car is able to turn almost in its own length.

=== Low carbon footprint and high fuel efficiency ===
The Tata Pixel features a start stop hybrid and regenerative braking system, with a fuel efficient and low emission diesel engine. It has CO_{2} emissions of 89 gm/km and combined cycle fuel economy of 1 litre/100 km.

=== Design ===
The Tata Pixel features a monographic roof, silver shaped window graphic and forward sweeping roof line. It also features 2 scissor doors for easy access and visibility.

=== My Tata Connect ===
"My Tata Connect" is a platform which provides integration of smart phones or tablet with the vehicle's information, and entertainment system and also allows the user to control the key functions of the car.

== Technical specifications ==
The Pixel is a 66 PS (49 kW; 65 hp) car with a three-cylinder 1200 cc rear engine.

Engine:	3 cylinder turbocharged diesel with Bosch multi-point fuel injection (single injector) all aluminium 66 horsepower (49 kW) 1,200 cc (73 cu in)
Engine:	Value Motronic engine management platform from Bosch
Engine:	3 valves per cylinder single overhead camshaft
Engine:	Compression ratio: 9.5:1
Engine:	bore × stroke: 73.5 mm (2.9 in) × 73.5 mm (2.9 in)
Engine:	Power: 66 PS (49 kW; 65 hp) @ 5250 rpm
Engine:	Torque: 48 N⋅m (35 ft⋅lbf) @ 3000 +/-500 rpm
Layout and Transmission	Rear wheel drive
Layout and Transmission	Infinitely variable transmission toroidal traction-drive
Steering	mechanical rack and pinion w/o servo, coupled to the IVT electronically, for close manouveurs
Steering	Turning radius: 2.6 metres
Performance	Acceleration: 0-60 km/h (37 mph): 8 seconds
Performance	Maximum speed: 105 km/h (65 mph)
Performance	Fuel efficiency (overall): 29.6 kilometres per litre (3.4 litres per 100 kilometres (83 mpg_{‑imp}; 69 mpg_{‑US}))
Body and dimensions	Seat belt: 4
Body and dimensions	Trunk capacity: 150 L (5.3 cu ft)
Suspension, Tires & Brakes	Front brake: 180 mm drum
Suspension, Tires & Brakes	Rear brake: 180 mm drum
Suspension, Tires & Brakes	Front track: 1,325 mm (52.2 in)
Suspension, Tires & Brakes	Rear track: 1,315 mm (51.8 in)
Suspension, Tires & Brakes	Ground clearance: 180 mm (7.1 in)
Suspension, Tires & Brakes	Front suspension: MacPherson strut with lower A arm
Suspension, Tires & Brakes	Rear suspension: Independent coil spring
Suspension, Tires & Brakes	15-inch wheels

Supplier	Part/system
Texspin	Clutch Bearings
Bosch	Oxygen sensor, Gasoline injection system (diesel will follow), starter, alternator, brake system
Continental AG	Gasoline fuel supply system, fuel level sensor
Caparo	Inner structural panels
HSI AUTO	Static sealing systems (Weather Strips)
Delphi	Instrument cluster
Denso	Windshield wiper system (single motor and arm)
FAG Kugelfischer	Rear-wheel bearing
Federal-Mogul	Pistons, Piston rings, Spark plugs, Gaskets, Systems protection
Ficosa	Rear-view mirrors, interior mirrors, manual and CVT shifters, washer system
Freudenberg	Engine sealing
GKN	Driveshafts
INA	Shifting elements
ITW Deltar	Outside and inside door handles
Johnson Controls	Seating
Mahle	Camshafts, spin-on oil filters, fuel filters and air cleaners
Saint-Gobain	Glass
TRW	Brake system
Ceekay Daikin/Valeo	Clutch sets
Vibracoustic	Engine mounts
Visteon	Air induction system
ZF Friedrichshafen AG	Chassis components, including tie rods
Behr	HVAC for the luxury version
Dürr	Lean Paint Shop

== See also ==
- City car
- A-segment
- Tata Nano
- Mobius Motors
