= Barapujia =

Barapujia or most appropriately, Niz Barapujia is a large village located in Raha of Nagaon district, Assam, India. It had a total of 1245 families residing there as of the 2011 census. It is approximately 5 km from Raha, 25 km from Nagaon and 18.6 km from Morigaon. According to Census 2011 information the location code or village code of Niz Barapujia village is 284826.

The village is in between two districts: viz Nagaon district and the Morigaon district. The areas around the villages are Darangial Gaon, Mikirgaon and Baruakhat.

== Transport ==
=== Road ===
Barapujia is well connected with the National Highway system connected to NH 36 and 37 providing easy access to important places in Assam. Buses connect the city with all parts of Assam. The most common way of transport from Barapujia to raha and vice versa is Autorickshaw or Tempo and from barapujia to morigaon is either bus or Small Van called Tata magic.

=== Railway ===
There are two railway stations near Barapujia, one at raha and another at Chaparmukh.

=== Airport ===
The nearest airport is Tezpur Airport. The nearest international airport is Lokpriya Gopinath Bordoloi International Airport in Guwahati.

== Geography ==
The total geographical area of village is 205.26 hectares. It covers a lot of agricultural land. The most common Picnic spot here is near the bridge called "Hatibandha dolong".

== Demographics ==
The population is largely of heterogeneous nature. Assamese, Tiwa (Lalung), communities form the majority. with very few marwari community.

The Niz Barapujia village has population of 5918 of which 2840 are males while 3078 are females as per Population Census 2011.peoples.

In Niz Barapujia village population of children with age 0-6 is 646 which makes up 10.92% of total population of village. Average Sex Ratio of Niz Barapujia village is 1084 which is higher than Assam state average of 958. Child Sex Ratio for the Niz Barapujia as per census is 934, lower than Assam average of 962.

Niz Barapujia village has higher literacy rate compared to Assam. In 2011, literacy rate of Niz Barapujia village was 76.61% compared to 72.19% of Assam. In Niz Barapujia Male literacy stands at 82.92% while female literacy rate was 70.90%.

As per constitution of India and Panchyati Raaj Act, Niz Barapujia village is administrated by Sarpanch (Head of Village) who is elected representative of village.

=== Schools ===
The Barapujia Higher Secondary School is a government school in the area. Pranjal Memorial Academy is the nearest English Medium School located in raha.
