= Tata Avinya =

Indian electric concept SUV

Overview
- Manufacturer: Tata Passenger Electric Mobility

Body and chassis
- Class: 5-door SUV

Powertrain
- Electric range: 500 kilometres (310 mi) (claimed)
- Plug-in charging: 500 kilometres (310 mi) under 30 minutes (claimed)

Dimensions
- Length: 4,300 mm (169.3 in)

Tata Avinya is a concept electric SUV designed and developed by Indian automaker Tata Passenger Electric Mobility (TPEM). It was unveiled on 29 April 2022 in Mumbai. This concept is the first car model to be based on the company's "Gen 3 architecture".

Avinya is a new brand of premium electric vehicles by Tata, developed on a Freelander platform developed by Chery, which is set to be introduced in the market by 2027 with the Avinya X.

== Naming ==
The word Avinya, derived from the Sanskrit language, means 'innovation' and 'Beauty'. Avinya, which also has 'in' in its letters, supposedly represents its Indian roots.

== Design ==
The concept, originally inspired by a catamaran, is claimed to be based on a human-centric design and the company claims that the concept has a versatility of a SUV and the comfort of a MPV.Martin Uhlarik is the head of design of this car.

The concept is the first model to be based on the "Gen 3 architecture", which is the design language of the company that is entirely focused on electric vehicles.The concept also focuses on incorporating sustainable materials in its interiors.

== Technology ==
One of the main features is increased range. The vehicles are set to offer more range than the current electric vehicles of the company.

The company's "Gen 3 architecture" is expected to support connectivity features, advanced driver-assistance system (ADAS) and enhanced performance and efficiency than the current models. The upcoming models on this platform is also expected to have a better water and dust protection engineered to global standards, than the current models.

Tata Avinya concept is said to support ultra-fast charging, giving a minimum claimed range of 500 kilometers under 30 minutes.
