= Tata Ace Zip =

Overview
- Manufacturer: Tata Motors
- Production: 2010–present(worldwide) 2010–2020(India)
- Assembly: Karnataka, India; Uttarakhand, India

Body and chassis
- Class: Micro truck
- Body style: Pickup truck
- Related: Tata Magic Iris

Powertrain
- Engine: 0.6 L diesel I2

Chronology
- Successor: Tata Ace Pro

The Tata Ace Zip is a micro-truck launched in May 2010 by Tata Motors in India. It is in competition with the prevalent three-wheeled goods carriers from Bajaj Auto, Piaggio, Mahindra and Force Motors.

== History ==
After the run away success of Tata Ace and Tata Super Ace, Tata Motors decided to launch a truck, the Tata Ace Zip, that would be smaller than the Ace and at the price point of the three-wheeled cargo auto rickshaws. It was to be a simple design with truck-like aggregates and was to replace the anachronistic three-wheeled cargo auto rickshaws in the Indian market.

== Launch and reaction ==
Tata Motors launched the Ace Zip micro-truck in May 2010 for just under Rs 200,000. The new vehicle was positively received by the users with good initial sales figures. The Tata Ace Zip is produced in the Pantnagar plant of Tata Motors.

== New segment ==
The Tata Ace Zip is marketed as a micro truck in India. Priced around at Rs 190,000, the company aims to convert three-wheeler users to four-wheelers. One of the ideas that prompted the launch of this vehicle was to develop more opportunities of self-employment in the country. Moreover, there was a need for an efficient last mile vehicle, Tata sought to find the gap in the market and released the Ace Zip.

The 611 cc engine delivers a power of 11.3 hp at 3000 rpm and a torque of 3.16 kgf⋅m at 1600–1800 rpm, giving tough competition to Piaggio's mini truck (three-wheeler). It has a permissible loading capacity of 600 kg. It also has a modern cabin compared to its three-wheeler rivals. It is best suited for use by villagers in carrying goods over short distances.

A passenger carrier on same platform, the Tata Magic Iris, has also been launched.

== Manufacturing locations ==
The mini truck is now produced at the facility in Pantnagar, Uttarakhand and at Dharwad, Karnataka.
