= Sanand Plant (Tata Motors) =

Car manufacturing facility in Gujarat, India

- Built: January 2010
- Location: Chharodi village, Sanand taluka, Ahmedabad district, Gujarat, India
- Industry: Automobile
- Products: Tata Tiago; Tata Tigor; Tigor EV
- Employees: 4,500 +
- Area: 1,100 acres (450 ha)

Sanand Plant is a passenger vehicles manufacturing facility located in Chharodi village of Sanand taluka in Ahmedabad district, Gujarat, India; owned and operated by Tata Motors. It is also their newest car manufacturing facility and manufactures popular hatchbacks like Tata Tiago and Tata Tigor. Initially it was started to manufacture the Tata Nano, but now it manufactures other hatchbacks like Tata Tiago and Tata Tigor. The plant reached 100% capacity utilization in 2018. Tata Motors rolled out the 3,00,000th Tiago manufactured at Sanand plant in 2020. The 1 Millionth car manufactured at this facility was rolled out in March 2024.

The manufacturing plant is spread over 1100 acres. It started as a single model plant in 2010 for manufacturing only the Tata Nano, and has gradually emerged to produce multiple models with a flexible assembly line. Today, the plant manufactures popular Tiago & Tigor models.

This plant played an important role in the development of the automobile industry in the state of Gujarat. After Tata Motors invested in Sanand, multiple automobile manufacturing plants have come up in Gujarat - Suzuki Motor Gujarat, Ford India, MG Motor India, Hero MotoCorp, Honda Motorcycle and Scooter India, etc.

Tata Electric Mobility is planning to acquire a second plant in Sanand from Ford motors as the current Sanand plant has reached 100% capacity.

== About ==
Built in a record time of 14 months starting November 2008, the integrated facility comprises Tata Motors’ own plant, spread over 725 acres, and an adjacent vendor park, spread over 375 acres, to house key component manufacturers for the Tata Nano. Luring the plant "to Gujarat had been a coup for [then-Chief Minister Narendra] Modi," that according to Robert D. Kaplan in his book Monsoon (p. 110)

Tata Motors’ plant for the Tata Nano at Sanand, located in the Ahmedabad district of Gujarat. The initially advertised capacity of the plant, in 2008, was 250,000 cars per year. In the ten years that followed, less than 300,000 in total of the Tata Nano were produced. Later, the plant was utilized to manufacture popular hatchbacks like Tata Tiago and Tata Tigor, and reached 100% capacity utilization in 2018. The plant has evolved from manufacturing a single model (Nano) to a multi-model flexible plant producing 21 variants with 150 vehicle combinations. It was awarded the CII’s GreenCo Platinum Certification for being a zero discharge plant with systematic hazardous waste disposal process. The plant also sources more than 30-35% of its total energy consumption from renewable sources (Solar + Wind). Tata Motors rolled out the 3,00,000th Tiago from its Sanand plant in September 2020.

=== Land ===
The 1100 acres of land which was allotted to Tata Motors falls in the villages of Khoda and Bol in Sanand Taluka. Tata Motors paid Rs 900/sqm (US$81,000 per acre) to the Gujarat Government for the land in Sanand.
