= Tata Ace =

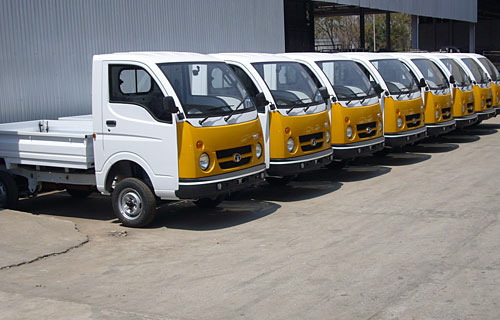

Overview
- Manufacturer: Tata Motors
- Also called: Tata Magic (Van); Kutty Yanai (called in South India Especially - Tamil Nadu); Chota Haathi
- Production: 2005–present
- Assembly: Pune, Maharashtra, India; Uttarakhand, India

Body and chassis
- Class: Mini truck
- Body style: Pickup truck
- Related: Tata Ace Zip

Powertrain
- Engine: 0.7 L diesel I2; 1.4 L diesel I4; Rear electric motor (Ace EV)

Dimensions
- Wheelbase: 2,100 mm (82.7 in); 2,380 mm (93.7 in)(Super Ace)
- Length: 3,800 mm (149.6 in)
- Width: 1,500 mm (59.1 in)
- Height: 1,860 mm (73.2 in)
- Curb weight: 885 kg (1,951 lb)

The Tata Ace is a model of mini truck manufactured by Tata Motors which was launched in 2005.

== History ==
In December 2000, Girish Wagh was given a brief by Ravi Kant to create a novel lightweight truck line that would add to Tata's current truck range. It was to be economical and to take on the three-wheeled cargo auto-rickshaws in the Indian market. Based on this brief, Wagh approached users of three-wheel cargo rickshaws and got their feedback on Tata's future four-wheel cargo vehicle. The feedback indicated the need for an affordable vehicle that could carry light loads over short distances. Additionally, the feedback also revealed that future owners would prefer owning a four-wheeler cargo vehicle, for the perceived prestige it would offer, over a three-wheeled vehicle.

Tata Ace has created a new mini-segment in India. Priced between INR 2.25 and 3.35 Lakh, the company aims to convert three-wheeler users to four-wheelers.

== Models ==
Tata produces four models - the Ace, the Super Ace, the Ace Zip and the Ace EV. Both the Ace and Ace Zip have a passenger variant called the Magic and Magic IRIS.

=== Ace ===
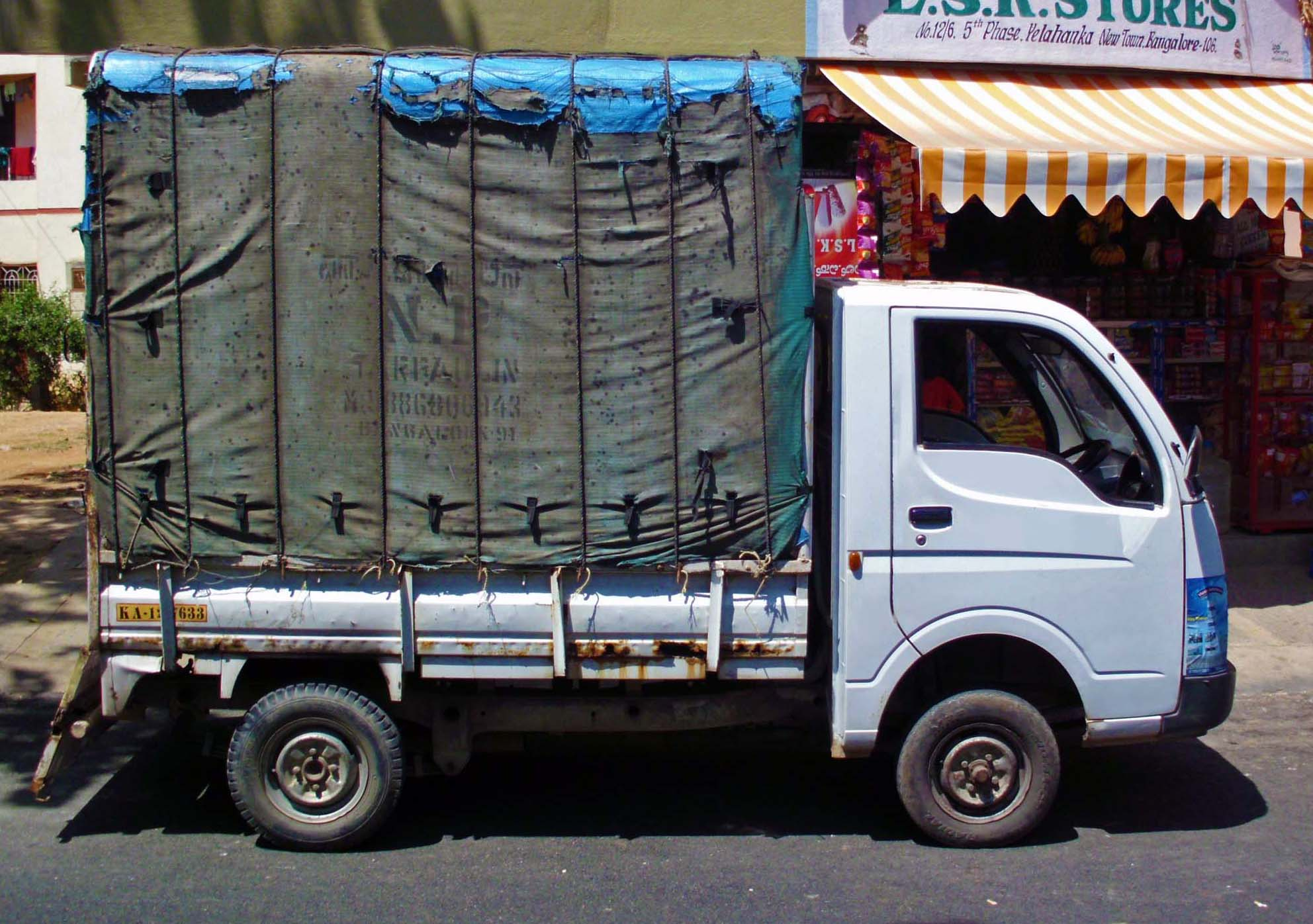
Side view of a Tata Ace in Bangalore

The standard Ace HT is powered by a two-cylinder 702 cc engine, delivering 16 hp (12 kW) at 3200 rpm and a torque of 3.8 kgf⋅m (37 N⋅m) at 2000 rpm. It has a permissible loading capacity of 750 kg (1650 lb). It is equipped with a four-speed manual gearbox and has a top speed of 60 km/h (37 mph).

The Ace EX adds a five-speed gearbox, stop-start and larger wheels (13" over 12") and wider tires (155 rather than 145), and a top speed of 70 km/h.

=== Tata Super Ace ===
The Tata Super Ace is a 1 Ton diesel mini truck aimed for Intra-city Applications and Last Mile Distribution. It has a loading deck length of 2630 mm (the longest in its class) and a top speed of 125 km/h (78 mph). The Super Ace has a turning radius of 5.1 m and a mileage of 14 km/L (8.75 mpl), which gives it a maximum range of 440 km per its 38 L fuel tank. It has a three-way drop load body which provides a 60 cm height for loading and unloading.

==== Super Ace Bigboy ====
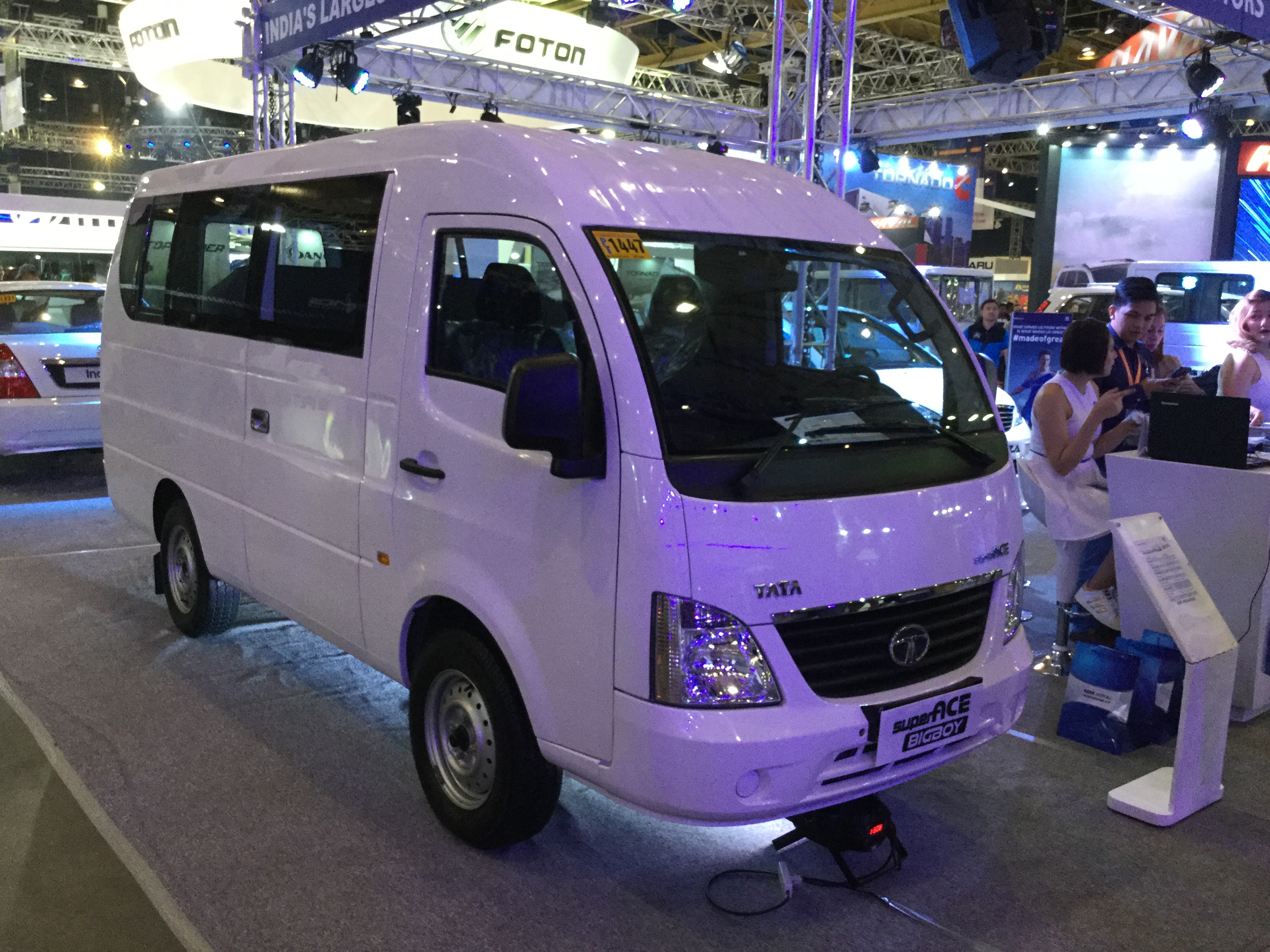
The Super Ace Bigboy at the 2017 MIAS show.

The Super Ace Bigboy is the prototype passenger version of the Super Ace. It was designed as part of the Public Utility Vehicle Modernization Program in the Philippines.

=== Tata Ace Zip ===
The Tata Ace Zip is marketed as a micro truck in India. Priced from Rs.1.9 lakhs INR onwards, the company aims to convert three-wheeler users to four-wheelers. One of the ideas that prompted the launch of this vehicle was to develop more opportunities for self-employment in the country. Moreover, there was a need for an efficient last-mile vehicle, so Tata sought to find the gap in the market and released the Ace Zip. The 611 cc engine delivers a power of 11.3 hp at 3000 rpm and a torque of 3.16 kgf⋅m at 1600–1800 rpm. It has a permissible loading capacity of 600 kg.

=== Ace Magic+ ===
In June 2007, Tata Motors launched a passenger variant, the Ace Magic. The vehicle has an all-steel cabin and a seating capacity of 4-7 passengers. It is powered by a 16 bhp (12 kW), 702 cc water-cooled diesel engine.

The Magic meets BS-III emission norms and has been developed for use in urban, semi-urban or rural markets. It is backed by a 36,000 km/12-month warranty. The Magic range starts at Rs 2.60 lakh (ex-showroom, Pune).

==== Tata Magic Iris ====
A passenger carrier based on the Tata Ace Zip platform, the Tata Magic Iris, has also been launched.

=== Ace EV ===
The Ace EV is the first product featuring Tata Motors’ EVOGEN powertrain. It is powered by a 27 kW (36 hp) motor with 130Nm of peak torque, cargo volume of 208 ft^{3} and grade-ability of 22%.

== Manufacturing locations ==
The mini truck is now produced at a facility located in Pantnagar, Uttarakhand, India although it was initially manufactured in Pune.

== See also ==
- Tata Ace Zip
- Tata Magic
- Mahindra Maxximo
