= Tata Magic =

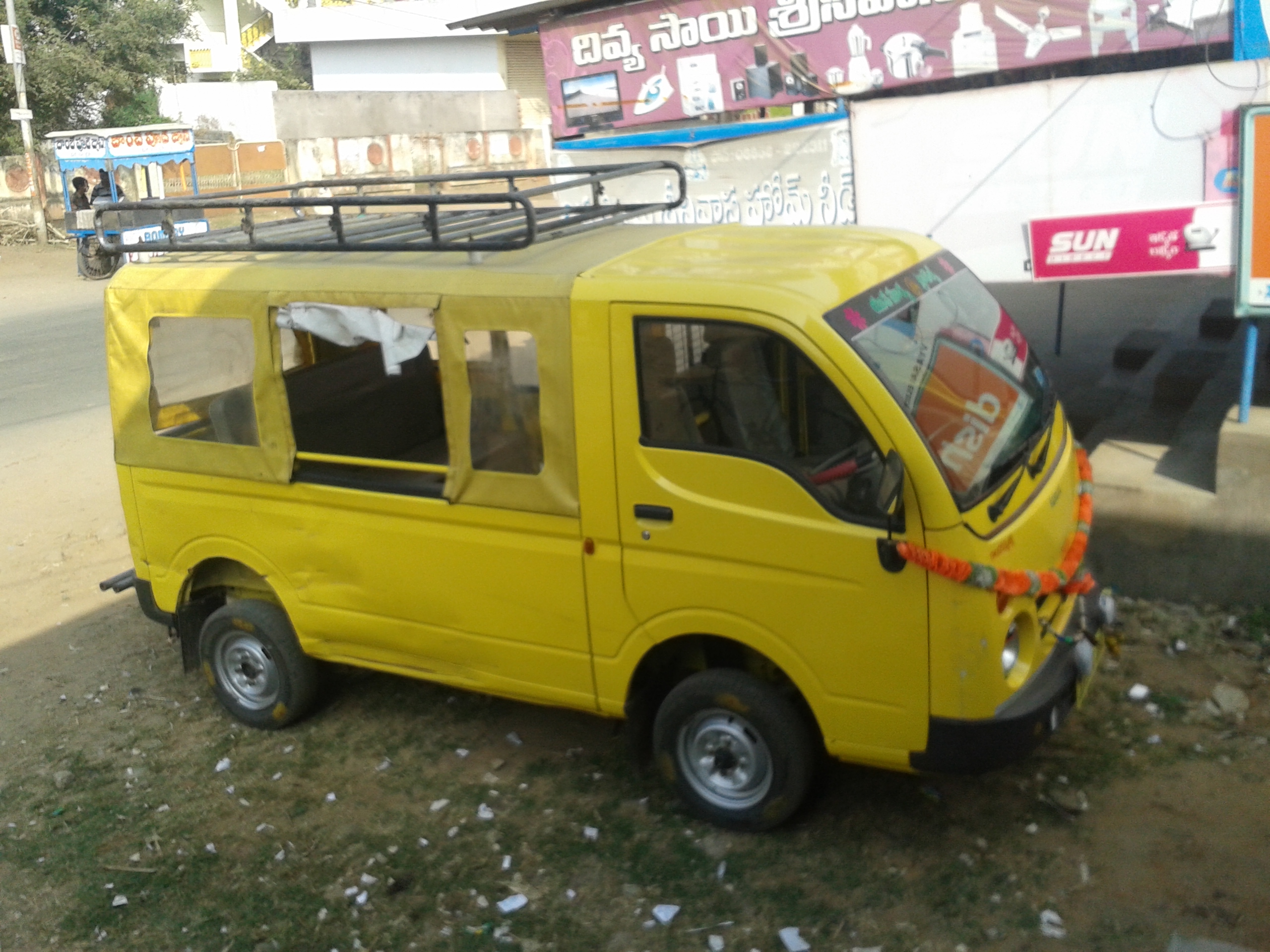

Overview
- Type: Microvan
- Manufacturer: Tata Motors
- Production: June 2007–present
- Assembly: Pune, India; Pantnagar, Uttarakhand, India

Body and chassis
- Class: MPV
- Body style: Microvan
- Layout: Front-mid engine, rear-wheel-drive
- Related: Tata Ace

Powertrain
- Engine: Diesel: 702 cc I2; 798 cc I2 turbo; CNG: 702 cc I2; Petrol: 694 cc I2 275MPFI03
- Transmission: 4-speed manual GBS 65-4; 5-speed manual GBS 65-5

Dimensions
- Wheelbase: 2,100 mm (83 in)
- Length: 3,790 mm (149 in)
- Width: 1,500 mm (59 in)
- Height: 1,890 mm (74 in)
- Kerb weight: 1,000–1,100 kg (2,200–2,400 lb)

The Tata Magic is a four-row Microvan produced by the Indian automaker Tata Motors. It is a passenger variant of the Ace mini-truck and is marketed as an affordable commercial vehicle with low operating costs. Hitting the 3 lakh sales mark and achieving 85% market share in 2015, it has been the most popular microvan in India since its introduction in 2007.

== Features ==
The Magic is offered in hardtop and soft-top variants and has an all steel body. It offers a flexible seating capacity of 4-7 passengers with adequate legroom, or up to 10 passengers maximum. Powered by a selection of two-cylinder engines, the Magic offers high fuel efficiency and low maintenance but has a low top speed as a result, with the fastest version achieving only 80 km/h (50 mph). The engine is placed underneath the vehicle behind the driver's cab and is rear wheel drive. The front axle is a rigid axle and the rear is a live axle. Both axles have semi-elliptical leaf springs and 13-inch wheels provide ground clearance of 15 cm (5.9 in). The Magic has a turning radius of 4.3 metres (14.1 ft).

== Powertrain ==
The Magic achieves a low cost of ownership with its diesel, petrol and CNG inline-two engines. It originally launched with a naturally aspirated four stroke 702 cc that is water cooled and has port injection. It produced 12 kW (16 hp) and 38 N⋅m (28 lb⋅ft) of torque while meeting BSIV emissions standards. It was paired with a four-speed manual transmission with synchromesh and achieved a top speed of 64 km/h (40 mph). Later, a CNG version of the engine was offered which produced 21 kW (28 hp) and 49 N⋅m (36 lb⋅ft) of torque which was paired with a new five-speed transmission, allowing for a higher top speed of 77 km/h (48 mph).

In 2018, a new more powerful diesel engine was offered with the introduction of the Magic Mantra. It is a turbocharged four-stroke 798 cc with direct injection and is intercooled. It produces 30 kW (40 hp) and 100 N⋅m (74 lb⋅ft) of torque and is paired with the five-speed transmission, achieving a top speed of 80 km/h (50 mph).

With the introduction of the Magic Express refresh, engines needed to comply with the incoming BSVI emissions standards. A new four-stroke naturally aspirated 694 cc petrol engine with port injection was introduced which makes 22 kW (30 hp) and 55 N⋅m (41 lb⋅ft) of torque. All models come equipped with the five-speed transmission.

Displacement	Fuel	Fuel Delivery	Transmission	Power	Torque	Top Speed	Emissions
702 cc	Diesel	MPFI	4-speed manual	12 kW (16 hp) @3200 rpm	38 N⋅m (28 lb⋅ft; 3.9 kg⋅m) @2000 rpm	64 km/h (40 mph)	BSIV
702 cc	CNG	MPFI	5-speed manual	21 kW (28 hp) @3400 rpm	49 N⋅m (36 lb⋅ft; 5.0 kg⋅m) @2200 rpm	77 km/h (48 mph)	BSIV
798 cc Turbo	Diesel	Direct	5-speed manual	30 kW (40 hp) @3750 rpm	100 N⋅m (74 lb⋅ft; 10 kg⋅m) @1700-2000 rpm	80 km/h (50 mph)	BSIV
694 cc	Petrol	MPFI	5-speed manual	22 kW (30 hp) @4000 rpm	55 N⋅m (41 lb⋅ft; 5.6 kg⋅m) @2500-3500 rpm	65 km/h (40 mph)	BSVI

== Variants ==
=== Magic Mantra ===
The Magic Mantra is a higher powered variant of the Magic introduced in 2018 and features an optional larger 798 cc turbocharged direct injection two-cylinder diesel motor that allows it to achieve a claimed top speed of 80 km/h (50 mph) and fuel economy of 4.67 L/100 km (50 mpg_{‑US}; 60 mpg_{‑imp}). It was offered in seven or eight seater configurations.

=== Magic Express & Mantra BS6 10 Seater ===
In 2019, the Magic was refreshed and the range was replaced with the Magic Express and Magic Mantra. They both feature a new petrol engine that meets new BSVI emissions standards, and the previous diesel and CNG models were discontinued. The Express has five full size doors, while the Mantra has half doors in the rear and has an optional canvas top. There is seating for ten passengers to circumvent new crash safety regulations that apply to passenger vehicles that seat under nine people. Power assisted brakes and rear parking sensors were added to satisfy new safety regulations. Additional updates include a new all digital gauge cluster with shift indicators, a more ergonomically positioned steering wheel, a USB-A charging port, and an Eco mode for petrol models.

== Magic EV ==
Tata Magic EV

Overview
- Manufacturer: Tata Motors
- Production: 2024 (to commence)

Body and chassis
- Layout: Rear-motor, rear-wheel drive
- Platform: Tata EVOGEN
- Related: Tata Ace EV

Powertrain
- Electric motor: AC induction motor
- Power output: 26–31 kW (35–42 hp)
- Transmission: Single speed gear reduction
- Battery: 20 kWh lithium iron phosphate (LFP)
- Electric range: 100–140 km (62–87 mi) estimated
- Plug-in charging: GB/T 15 kW DC 3.45 onboard AC

Dimensions
- Kerb weight: 1,355 kg (2,987 lb)

An electric variant of the Magic was unveiled at the 2023 Tata Motors Auto Expo. It is based on the in-production Ace EV and shares a similar EVOGEN powertrain. It is offered with a 20 kWh liquid cooled Lithium Iron Phosphate battery which achieves a claimed range of 100–140 kilometres (62–87 mi). The motor outputs 26–31 kW (35–42 hp) and 90–115 N⋅m (9.2–11.7 kg⋅m; 66–85 lb⋅ft) of torque and is coupled to a single-speed gear reduction transmission. It is equipped with a GB/T charging port, and charging times are claimed to be 6-6.5 hours when slow charging, and 1.1-1.7 hours when fast charging. The drivetrain has an IP67 water and dust resistance rating. It can seat ten passengers and has an increased gross vehicle weight rating of 2,180 kg (4,810 lb) and a payload capacity of 825 kg (1,819 lb). Additional features include a 7-inch infotainment display, a voice assistant, and a reverse camera. It is expected to become available sometime in 2024.
