= Tata Magic Iris =

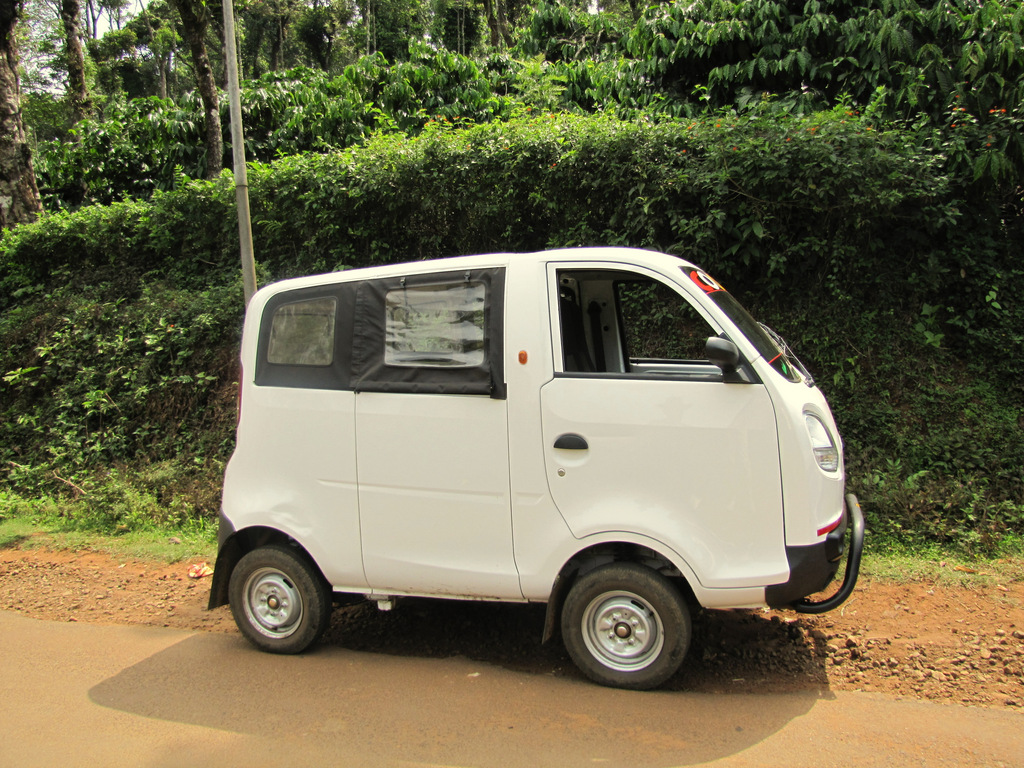

Overview
- Manufacturer: Tata Motors
- Production: 2010-present
- Assembly: Pune, India; Uttarakhand, India

Body and chassis
- Class: Microvan/Minivan
- Body style: 3-door MPV
- Layout: RR layout
- Related: Tata Ace Zip

Powertrain
- Engine: 0.6 L diesel Single
- Power output: 10.84 hp (8.08 kW)
- Transmission: 4-speed TA59 manual transaxle
- Range: 300 km (190 mi) (ARAI)

Dimensions
- Wheelbase: 1,650 mm (65.0 in)
- Length: 2,960 mm (116.5 in)
- Width: 1,512 mm (59.5 in)
- Height: 1,800 mm (70.9 in) (unladen)
- Curb weight: 685 kg (1,510 lb)

The Tata Magic Iris is a 3-door, 4- or 5-seater cabover microvan/minivan (MPV) manufactured by the Indian automaker Tata Motors. Powered by a 600cc one-cylinder diesel engine, it is intended to compete with auto-rickshaws.
With its engine delivering 11 hp (8 kW) and 31 Nm of torque, the vehicle has a top speed of just 34 mph (55 km/h).

The Magic Iris is made using an all steel body and frame – reinforced by reverse hat section chassis rails and beams, welded under its floor.
The vehicle features all-around independent suspension with coil springs – MacPherson struts in the front, and semi-trailing arms in the rear.

It uses a cabover design, meaning the driver seating on top of the front axle and the engine mounted at the rear, and with a vehicle length 1 cm shorter than the 1957 Fiat 500, the Magic Iris is one of the shortest four-seater cars ever produced — however its limited top speed would prohibit actually registering it as a car in many countries.

== See also ==
- Tata Ace Zip
- Kei car
