= Charodi, Gujarat =

Charodi
- village
- Location in Gujarat, India Charodi (India)
- Coordinates: 23.047°N 72.255°E
- Country: India
- State: Gujarat
- District: Ahmedabad

Languages
  - Official: Gujarati, Hindi
- Time zone: UTC+5:30 (IST)
- Vehicle registration: GJ
- Nearest city: Ahmedabad
- Website: gujaratindia.com

Charodi is a village near Sanand in Ahmedabad district in Indian state of Gujarat. Tata Motors had set up manufacturing facilities in 2008 near the village. The plant currently produces Tiago, Tigor and other hatchbacks.

Farming is the main occupation. People cultivate paddy, wheat, castor, cotton and sorghum. The population is more than 1000. There is a Muslim majority, with two mosques. Hindus also live here and have one large temple. People use their local Gujarati language to communicate. There is also railway station also in the village.
