= Tata Technologies =

Indian engineering services company

Tata Technologies Limited
- Type: Public Subsidiary
- Traded as: BSE: 544028; NSE: TATATECH
- ISIN: INE142M01025
- Founded: 1989; 37 years ago
- Headquarters: Pune, Maharashtra, India
- Key people: Warren Harris (MD & CEO)
- Services: Design and engineering; Product development; Product lifecycle management
- Revenue: ▲₹5,233 crore (US$540 million) (FY24)
- Operating income: ▲₹932 crore (US$97 million) (FY24)
- Net income: ▲₹727 crore (US$75 million) (FY24)
- Number of employees: 11,000 (2023)
- Parent: Tata Motors (53.39%)
- Website: www.tatatechnologies.com

Tata Technologies Limited is an Indian multinational corporation and technology company engaged in product engineering, that provides services to automotive and aerospace original equipment manufacturers as well as industrial machinery companies. It is a subsidiary of Tata Motors.

Tata Technologies has its headquarters in Pune and regional headquarters in Detroit, Michigan, United States. As of 2023, the company has a combined global workforce of more than 11,000 employees across its 18 delivery centres in India, North America, Europe and the Asia-Pacific region.

== History ==
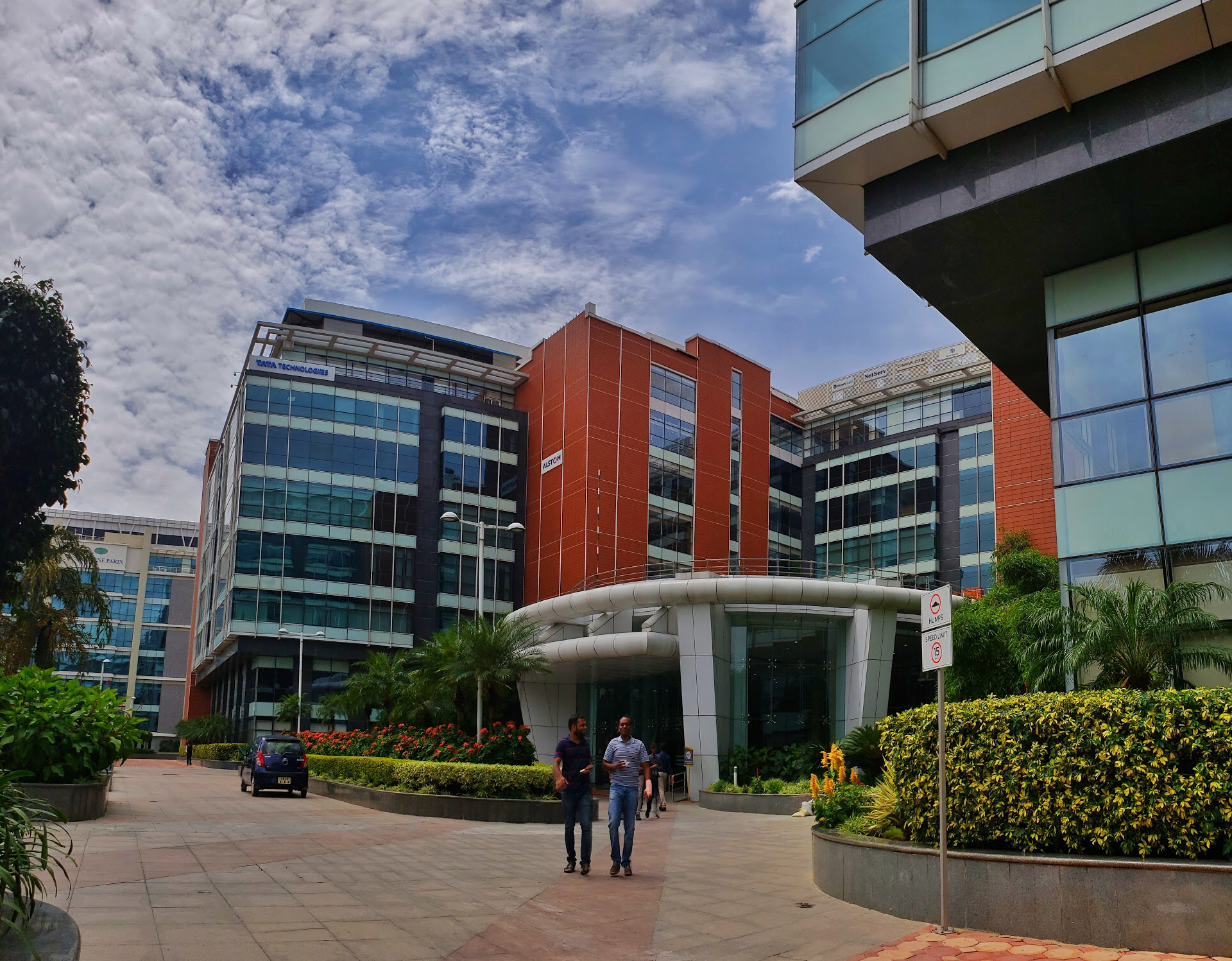
Tata Technologies office in Bangalore

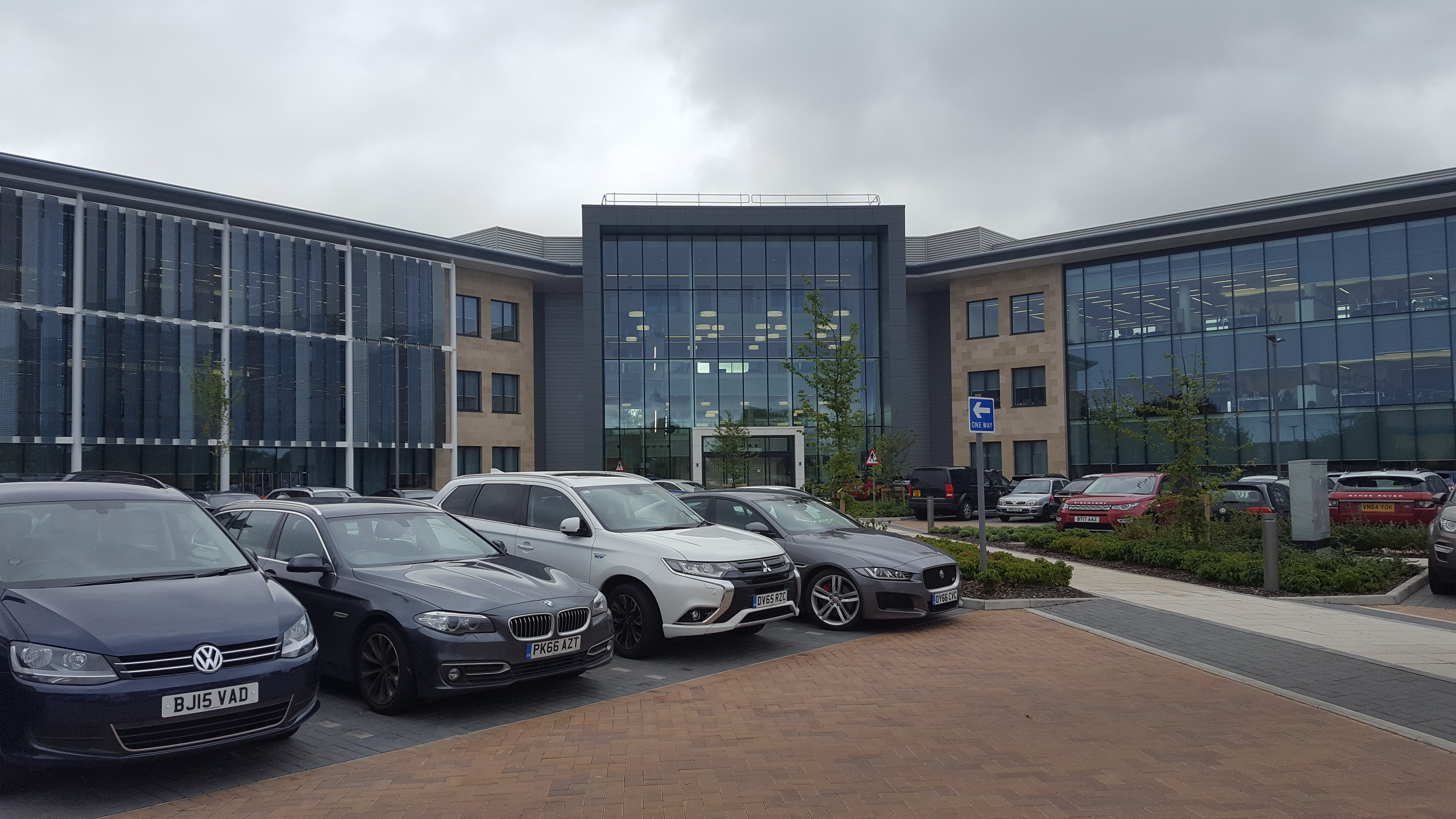
Tata Technologies European Innovation & Development Center in Leamington Spa, England

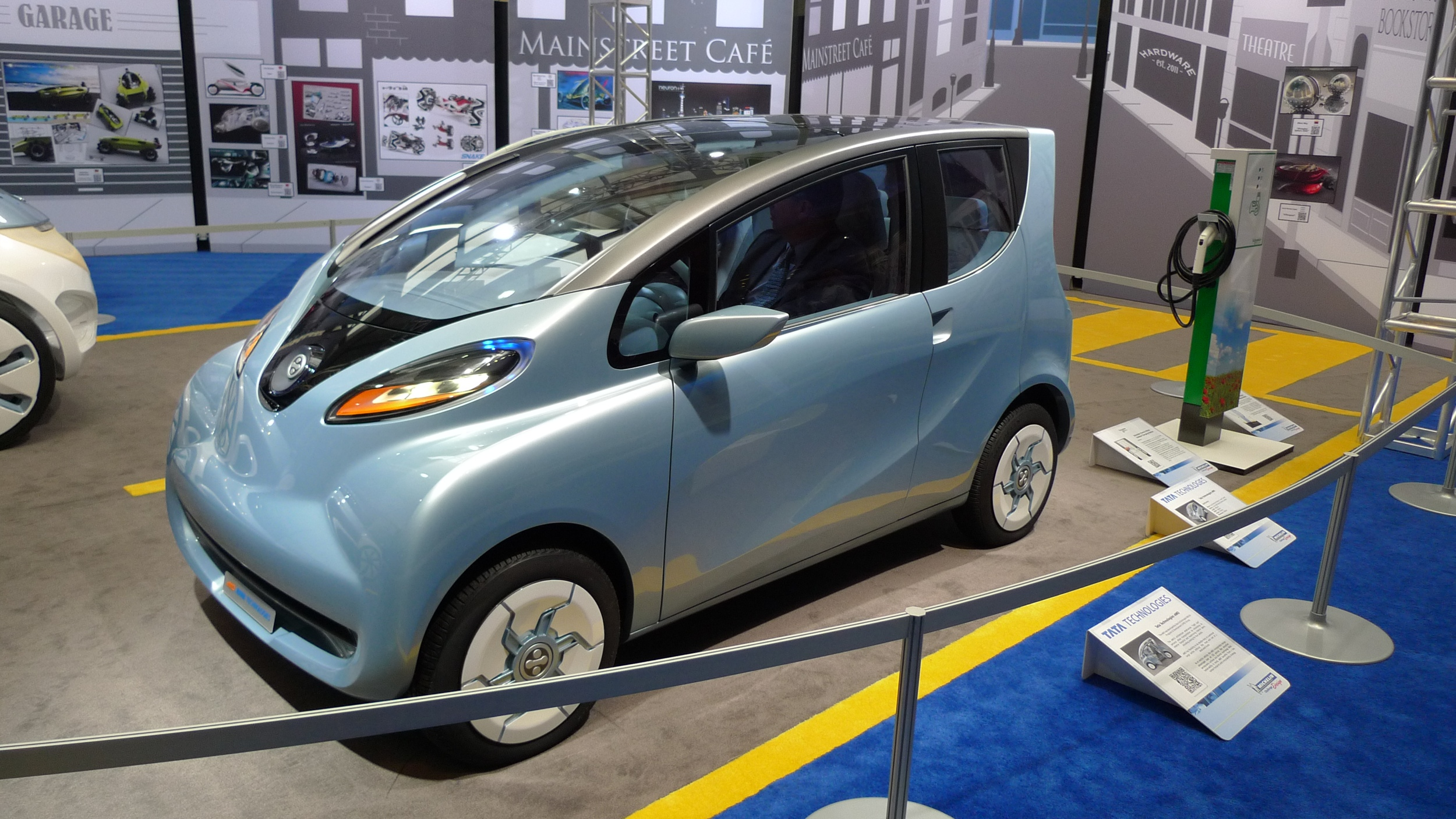
eMO, a concept electric car developed by Tata Technologies, on display at the 2012 North American International Auto Show

Tata Technologies was founded in 1989, as the automotive design unit of Tata Motors. It was hived off as a separate company in 1994, with Tata Motors continuing to hold a majority stake and be its biggest client.

Tata Technologies Inc acquired INCAT International, a UK-and US-based automotive and aerospace engineering company, in August 2005 for £53.4 million.

In 2011, Tata Technologies raised ₹141 crore (US$30 million) by selling 13% stake to Tata Capital and Alpha TC Holdings.

In April 2013, Tata Technologies acquired Cambric Corporation, an American engineering services company, for $32.5 million.

In May 2017, Tata Technologies acquired 100% stake in Swedish automotive design and product engineering company, Escenda Engineering AB.

In 2017, in an effort to reduce Tata Motors' debt, the Tata Group announced that it would sell a 43% stake in Tata Technologies to private equity firm Warburg Pincus for $360 million and cease to be the controlling shareholder in the company. However, the deal was called off in 2018.

In November 2023, Tata Technologies launched its book-built initial public offering (IPO) selling shares worth ₹3,042 crore (US$320 million), making it Tata Group's first public offering in nearly two decades. Its shares began trading on NSE and BSE on 30 November 2023.

In 2024, Tata Technologies and BMW, a German automotive manufacturer, formed a joint venture named BMW TechWorks India. The joint venture will focus on developing software related technology for vehicles and IT services for BMW’s global business operations.

In September 2025, Tata Technologies agreed to acquire a 100% stake in German automotive engineering services firm ES-Tec Group for €75 million. The buyout includes ES-Tec's subsidiaries, such as ES-Tec America, Inc. in San Jose, California, and ES-Tec Morocco, expanding the company's delivery capabilities in automotive software, advanced driver-assistance systems (ADAS), and vehicle intelligence.
