= Panapakkam =

Panapakkam Vellore Psnapakkam
- Town panchayat
- Location in Tamil Nadu, India
- Coordinates: 12.92°N 79.58°E
- Country: India
- State: Tamil Nadu
- District: Ranipet
- Region: Vellore
- Talukas: Nemili

Government
  - Leader, Town Panchayat: E O

Area
  - Total: 6.5 km^{2} (2.5 sq mi)
- Elevation: 110 m (360 ft)

Population (2011)
  - Total: 11,536
  - Density: 1,800/km^{2} (4,600/sq mi)

Languages
  - Official: Tamil
- Time zone: UTC+5:30 (IST)
- PIN: 631052
- Vehicle registration: TN-73
- Lok Sabha constituency: Arakonam
- Vidhan Sabha constituency: Sholinger

Panapakkam is a panchayat town in Nemili Taluk within Chennai Metropolitan Area of Ranipet district in the Indian state of Tamil Nadu, about 46 kilometres from Vellore city and 30 kilometres from Ranipet and 85 kilometres from Chennai.

== Demographics ==
As of 2001 India census, Panapakkam had a population of 10,142. Males constitute 49% of the population and females 51%. Panapakkam has an average literacy rate of 66%, higher than the national average of 59.5%: male literacy is 75%, and female literacy is 57%. In Panapakkam, 12% of the population is under 6 years of age.

Panapakkam is near Kancheepuram Chennai Greenfield Airport.

== Location ==
Panapakkam is about 85 km west of Chennai, 46 km east of Vellore and 18 km west of Kanchipuram and 25 km from Arakkonam.
