= Ficosa =

Spanish multinational in the automotive parts industry

Ficosa International S.A.
- Type: Multinational corporation
- Industry: Automotive industry
- Founded: 1949; 77 years ago
- Founders: Josep Maria Pujol and Josep Maria Tarragó
- Headquarters: Barcelona, Spain
- Area served: Worldwide
- Products: Automotive parts, automotive systems
- Number of employees: 6,700 (2010)
- Subsidiaries: 40 subsidiaries in 19 countries
- Website: www.ficosa.com

Ficosa, short for Ficosa International S.A., is a Spanish multinational corporation, devoted to the research, development, production of systems and parts for the automotive industry.

Founded in 1949 and headquartered in Barcelona, it has production centres, engineering centres and commercial offices in 19 countries in Europe, North America, South America and Asia, with 6,700 employees (2010). Revenue was €900 million in 2008, with 80% coming from international sales.

== History ==
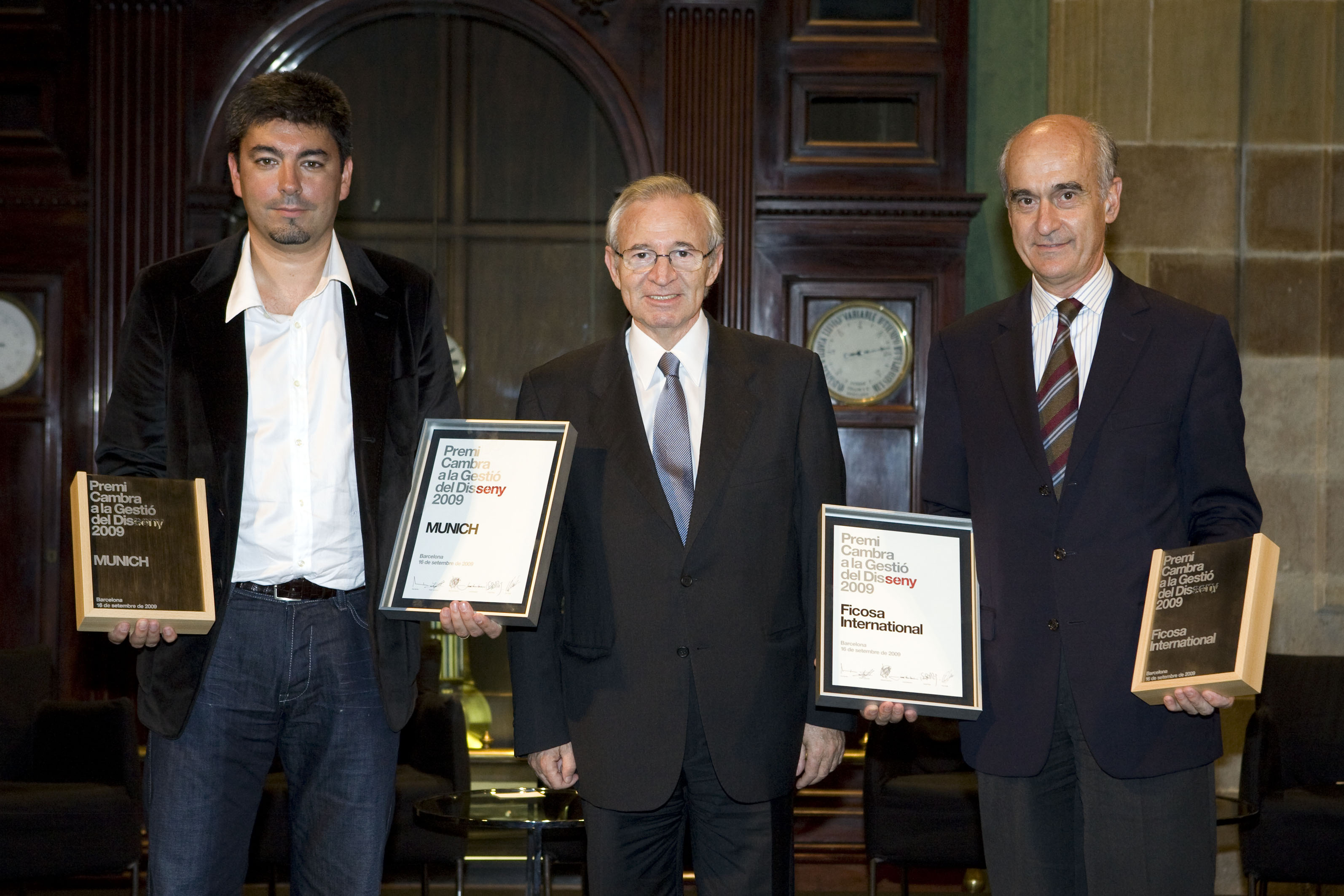
At the right, Vicenç Aguilera, COO of Ficosa, receiving the award Gestió del Disseny 2009.

Ficosa was started in Barcelona in 1949 when Josep Maria Pujol and Josep Maria Tarragó founded Pujol y Tarragó S.L., a small workshop which produced mechanical cables for the after-sales market. The company grew and opened an office in Portugal in 1970. After 1985, when Spain joined the EU, Ficosa started a strong international expansion. Ficosa expanded to USA and Mexico in 1995, and to Brazil and Argentina in 1997. In 1998 it was established in India, through a joint venture with the Tata Group. In 2001 Ficosa purchased the mirror division of Magneti Marelli.

Ficosa opened an office in Japan in 2001 and established alliances in Korea (2001), Romania and China (2002). In 2005 Ficosa opened second factories in Turkey and India and a new factory in Poland. In 2006 a subsidiary and an engineering center was opened in China, and a third factory in India. An engineering center was opened in 2006 in Monterrey (Mexico). Russian operations started in 2007. In 2008 Ficosa acquired the assets of the US company Delbar. Together with Omron it created the company Adasens, specialized in ADAS (advanced driver-assistance systems). Ficosa acquired the companies Imic in 2010 and Camryn in 2011, with production plants in Indiana, Tennessee and Kentucky and a technical center in Michigan, increasing its mirror systems market share to 28,7% in the NAFTA region.

In July 2014, Ficosa negotiated a capital increase of 100 million euros. Negotiations were open, with a focus on Japan. In September 2014, an agreement was reached with Panasonic according to which the Japanese company will acquire 49% of the shares of the Viladecavalls-based group. Panasonic made this purchase with the intention of gaining the experience in automotive glass that Ficosa has, with a view to the future electronic mirror of vehicles. The cost of the purchase was not made public, but industry sources estimated it at around 200 million euros. This sale also served to put an end to the dispute between the Pujol and Tarragó families, the company's main shareholders who had been at enmity since 2011.

In March 2017, Panasonic took control of the company, acquiring 69% of the shares.

== Corporate structure ==
The Ficosa Group is made of 40 companies from all over the world: Ficosa-owned companies, associated companies and subsidiaries, joint ventures and strategic alliances.

=== Europe ===
==== Spain ====
- Ficosa International, S.A.
- Fico Cables, S.A.
- Ficomirrors, S.A.
- Fico Transpar, S.A.
- Fico Triad, S.A.
- Ficosa Electronic
- Advanced Automotive Antennas, S.L.
- Industrias Technoflex, S.A.
- Lames Ibérica, S.A.
- Flexibles Barcelona, S.L.
- Suministros Hidráulicos Valencia, S.L.
- Ficosa Galicia, S.L.
- Somnoalert, AIE
- Adasens Automotive, S.L.
- Ficosa Int. Grupo Mecánica del Vuelo Sistemas, UTE

==== Portugal ====
- Ficosa International, Lda.
- Fico Cables, Lda.

==== Germany ====
- Ficosa International GmbH
- Adasens Automotive GmbH

==== United Kingdom ====
- Ficosa International Ltd.

==== Italy ====
- Ficosa International, S.r.l.
- Ficomirrors Italia, S.r.l. a s.u.

==== France ====
- Ficosa International, S.A.
- Fico Cipa, S.A.
- Ficomirrors France, S.A.S
- Seric, S.A.
- Marice Lecoy, S.A.
- Cipa Industrie, S.A.

==== Poland ====
- Ficomirrors Polska SP. Z.O.O.

==== Romania ====
- SC UAMT (Alliance - Licensing)

==== Turkey ====
- Ficosa Otomotiv Sanayi Ve Ticaret Anonim Sirketi
- Ficosa International Otomotiv San Ve Tic. A.S.

==== Russia ====
- Zavod Avtocomponent (Alliance - Licensing)

=== America ===
==== United States ====
- Ficosa North America Corp.

==== Mexico ====
- Ficosa North America S.A. de C.V.

==== Brasil ====
- Ficosa do Brasil, Ltda.

==== Argentina ====
- Ficosa Argentina, S.A.

=== Asia ===
==== India ====
- Tata Ficosa Automotive Systems, Ltd. (Joint Venture.....)
- Ficosa India Engineering services Center pvt. Ltd, Hyderabad

==== China ====
- Ficosa International (Shanghai) Automotive Components Co., Ltd.
- Ficosa International Taicang Co. LTD.
- Shanghai Ficosa Traiding Co. LTD
- Ficosa International Shenyang Co. LTD

==== Korea ====
- Daeshin Machinery Ind. Co., Ltd. (Joint Venture)

==== Japan ====
- Ficosa Japan (Technical and Commercial Office)
- Tata Ficosa Automotive Systems, Ltd. (Joint Venture.....)
